= Dhunge dhara =

Stone drinking fountains in Nepal

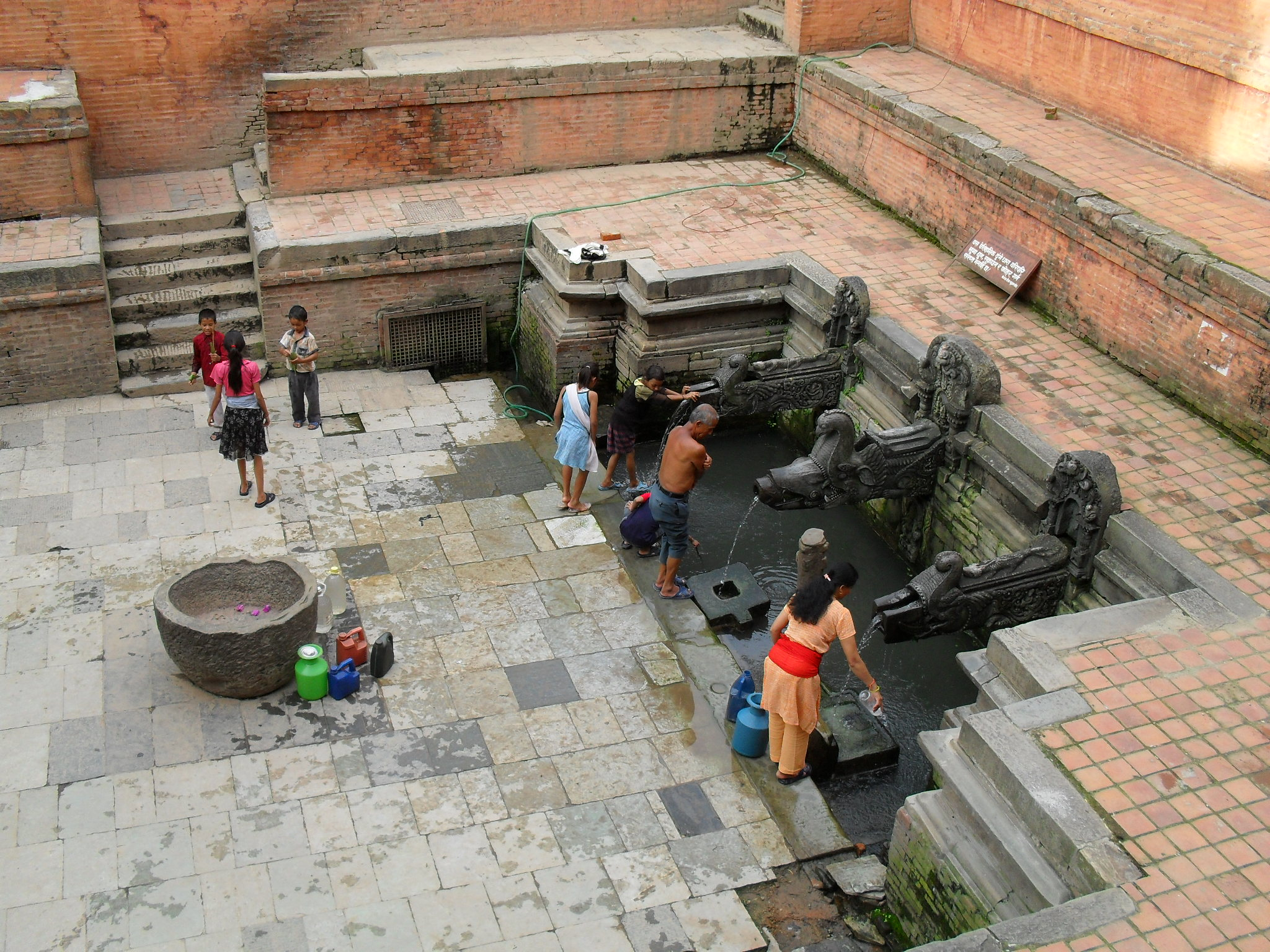
Manga Hiti in Patan is the oldest dhunge dhara still working

A dhunge dhara (Nepali: ढुङ्गे धारा lit. 'stone faucet') or hiti (Newar: 𑐴𑐶𑐟𑐶) is a traditional stone drinking fountain found in Nepal. It is an intricately carved stone waterway through which water flows uninterrupted from underground sources. Dhunge dharas are part of a comprehensive drinking water supply system, commissioned by various rulers of Ancient and Medieval Nepal. The system is supported by numerous ponds and canals that form an elaborate network of water bodies, created as a water resource during the dry season and to help alleviate the water pressure caused by the monsoon rains. After the introduction of modern, piped water systems, starting in the late 19th century, this old system has fallen into disrepair and some parts of it are lost forever. Nevertheless, many people of Nepal still rely on the old dhunge dharas on a daily basis.

== Etymology ==
Dhunge Dhara is a Nepali term which literally means "stone faucet". Hiti is the term used by the native Newar people, which derives from the Classical Newar word iti, a term which is used in historical records from the Malla dynasty to refer to the hiti system. One of the earliest mentions of the term is an inscription dated to 1387 (NS 508) set up by Jayasthiti Malla. Stone inscriptions from the Lichhavi dynasty refer to the hiti system as Pranali.

== History ==
The history of dhunge dharas began during the Licchavi Kingdom (c. 400–750 AD). The earliest record of a dhunge dhara names king Brisasdev (c. 400–425 AD) as the creator of the water system.

The first known hiti was built in Kathmandu at Hadi Gaun by a grandson of Lichhavi King Mandev I in 550 AD. One Nepalese legend would indicate the existence of a working dhunge dhara in approximately 464 AD (see below).

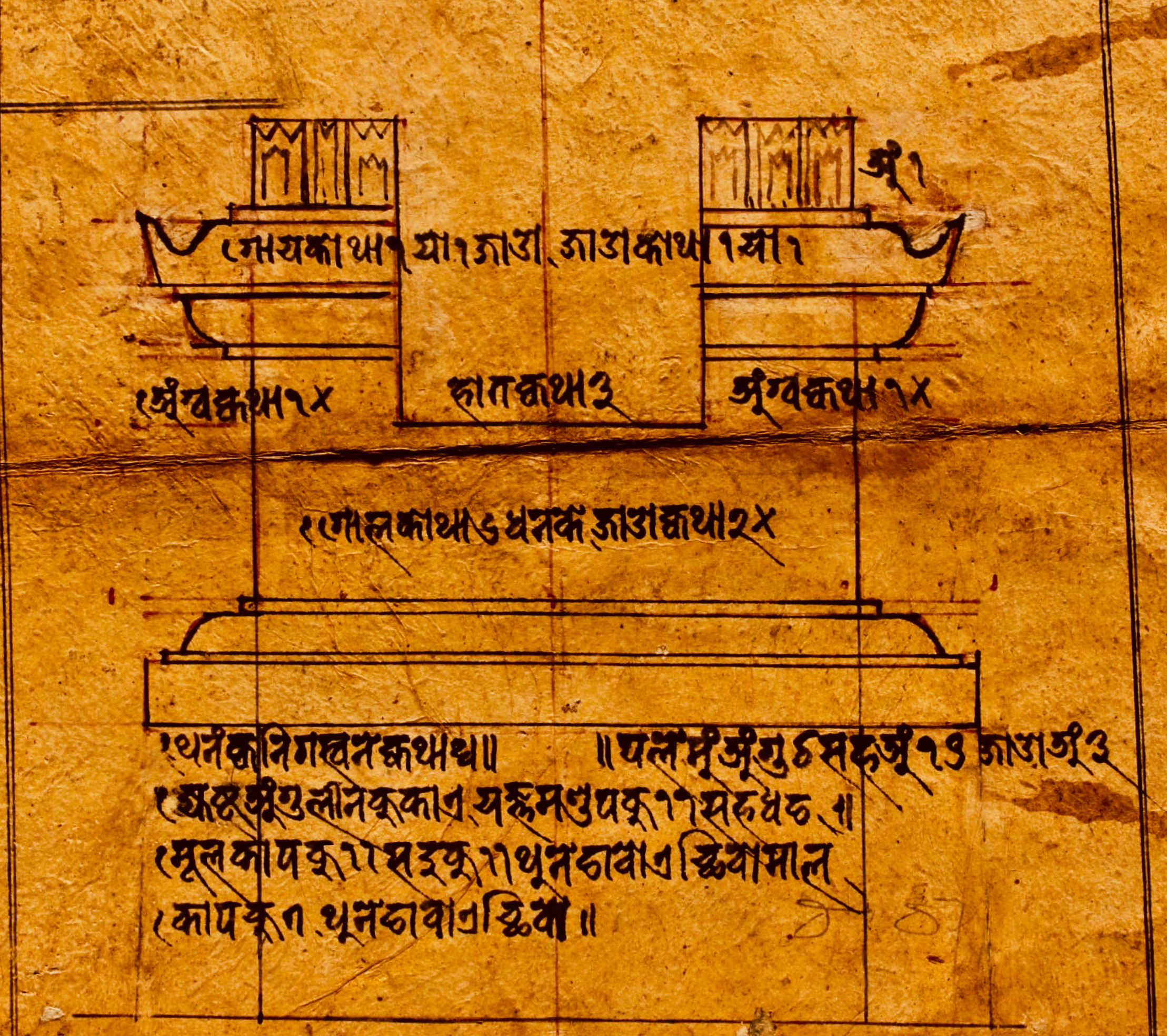
A 16th-century, Newar Language manuscript about hiti design

Manga Hiti at Mangal Bazar in Patan is considered to be the oldest working dhunge dhara on record. It was built in 570 AD. In the case of the Hadi Gaun hiti and Manga Hiti, the dates were engraved on a stone within the hiti. Gradually more hitis started to appear elsewhere in Kathmandu Valley.

During the Malla period (c. 1201–1779 AD) many more hiti systems were built. Jitamitra Malla of Bhaktapur, Pratap Malla of Kathmandu and Siddhinarshinha Malla of Patan are famous for the water systems in these cities. The hiti built in 1829 by Queen Lalit Tripura Sundari Devi and Bhimsen Thapa at Sundhara village (now Kathmandu) is generally believed to be the last one built.

In 2008, the dhunge dharas of Kathmandu Valley produced 2.95 million litres of water per day. In 2019 the amount of water produced by the dhunge dharas in Kathmandu was estimated at 382,399 litres per day.

Of the 389 stone spouts found in Kathmandu Valley in 2010, 233 were still in use, serving about 10% of Kathmandu's population. 68 had gone dry and 45 dhunge dharas were lost entirely. Forty-three were connected to the municipal water supply instead of their original source.

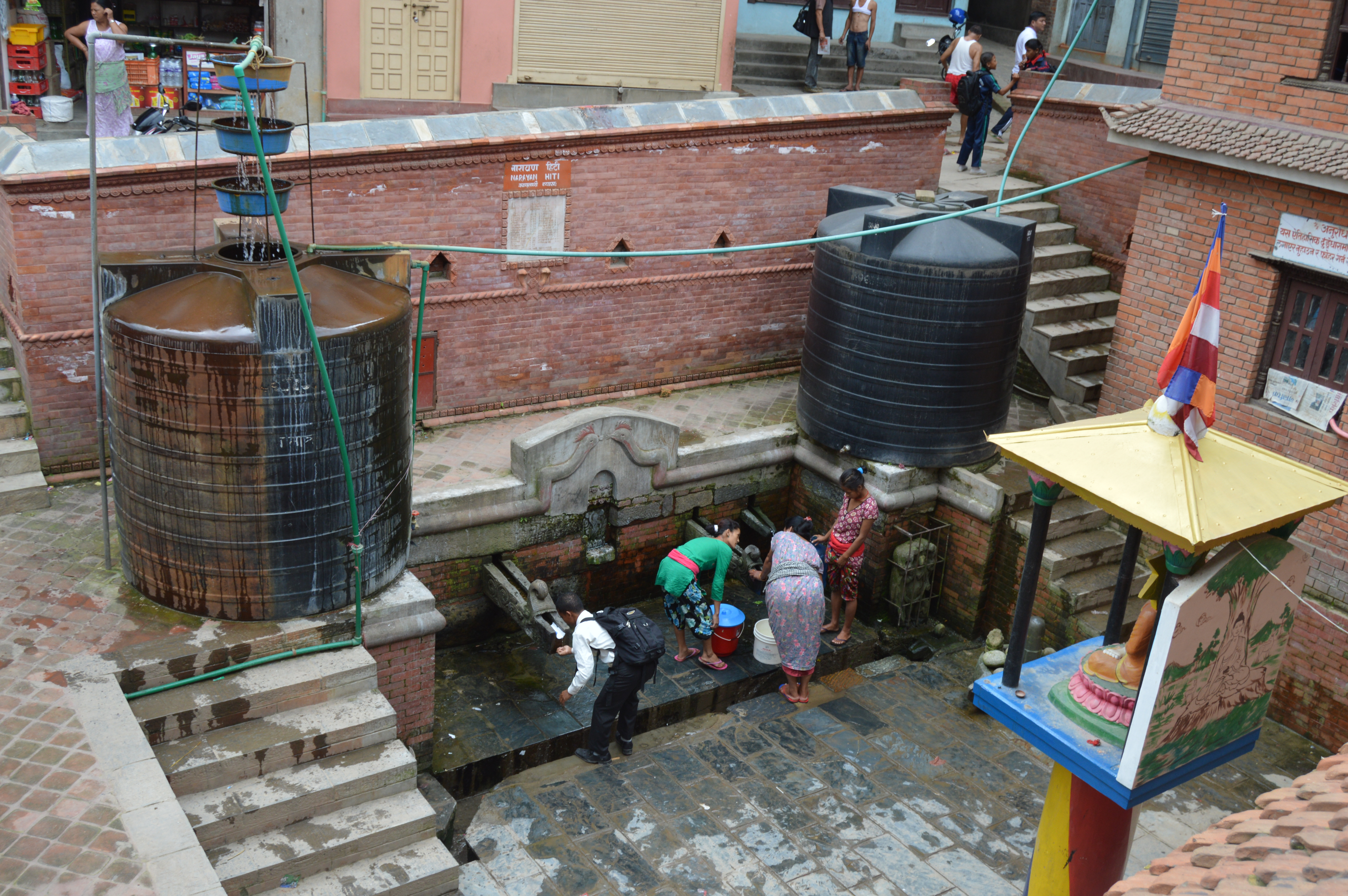
Narayan Hiti in Patan with storage tanks

Over the years a number of working dhunge dharas have been modified to better suit the needs of the users. In most cases such modifications included adding one or more large water tanks to store the excess water from the spouts for later use or distribution among the surrounding households. Sundhara in Patan, for instance was augmented with a 25,000 litre underground tank. Narayan Hiti in Patan is one of the hitis supplied with overhead tanks. And several modern elements have been added to Alko Hiti, like a water tower, underground pipes, rainwater recharge pits and ponds.

In Iku Hiti of Patan, water from the spouts is collected in an 80,000 litres storage tank. From there it is distributed to the surrounding communities by Kathmandu Upatyaka Khanepani Limited (KUKL), the company dedicated to supplying drinking water in the Kathmandu Valley, in the same way water from regular sources is distributed.

In 2019, a survey by the Kathmandu Valley Water Supply Management Board (KVWSMB) found a total of 573 dhunge dharas on record in the ten municipalities of the Kathmandu Valley. 94 of these dhunge dharas were lost entirely. Of the remaining 479 dhunge dharas, 224 produced water to varying degrees, totalling 2,433,348 litres of water per day at the time of the survey.

In March 2021, a start was made by the Department of Mines and Geology with using Ground-penetrating radar (GPR) to track down lost dhunge dharas.

In March 2022, the dhunge dharas of Kathmandu valley were placed on the 2022 World Monuments Watch by the World Monuments Fund (WMF), an organisation dedicated to raising awareness of culturally important places in the world and supporting the people who care for them.

== Basic architecture ==
=== Spouts ===
Dhunge dhara literally means stone spout, but some dhunge dharas are made from other materials like brass, copper, gold and wood.

Most of spouts are in the shape of the mythical makara (also called hitimanga). This is a creature with the snout of a crocodile, the trunk of an elephant, tusks and ears of a wild boar and the tail of a peacock. Hitimangas are ubiquitous in Nepal, not only on hitis, but also on vajras (ritual weapons), toranas (traditional door and window ornaments) and other architectural elements.

The body of the makara forms an open channel, with a removable cover. The sides of the makara as well as the cover are usually decorated with sculptures of water related symbols and creatures. Often one or more other creatures emerge from the mouth of the makara in a telescopic sequence, for instance a goat, a ram or a bull, out of whose mouth the water eventually flows.

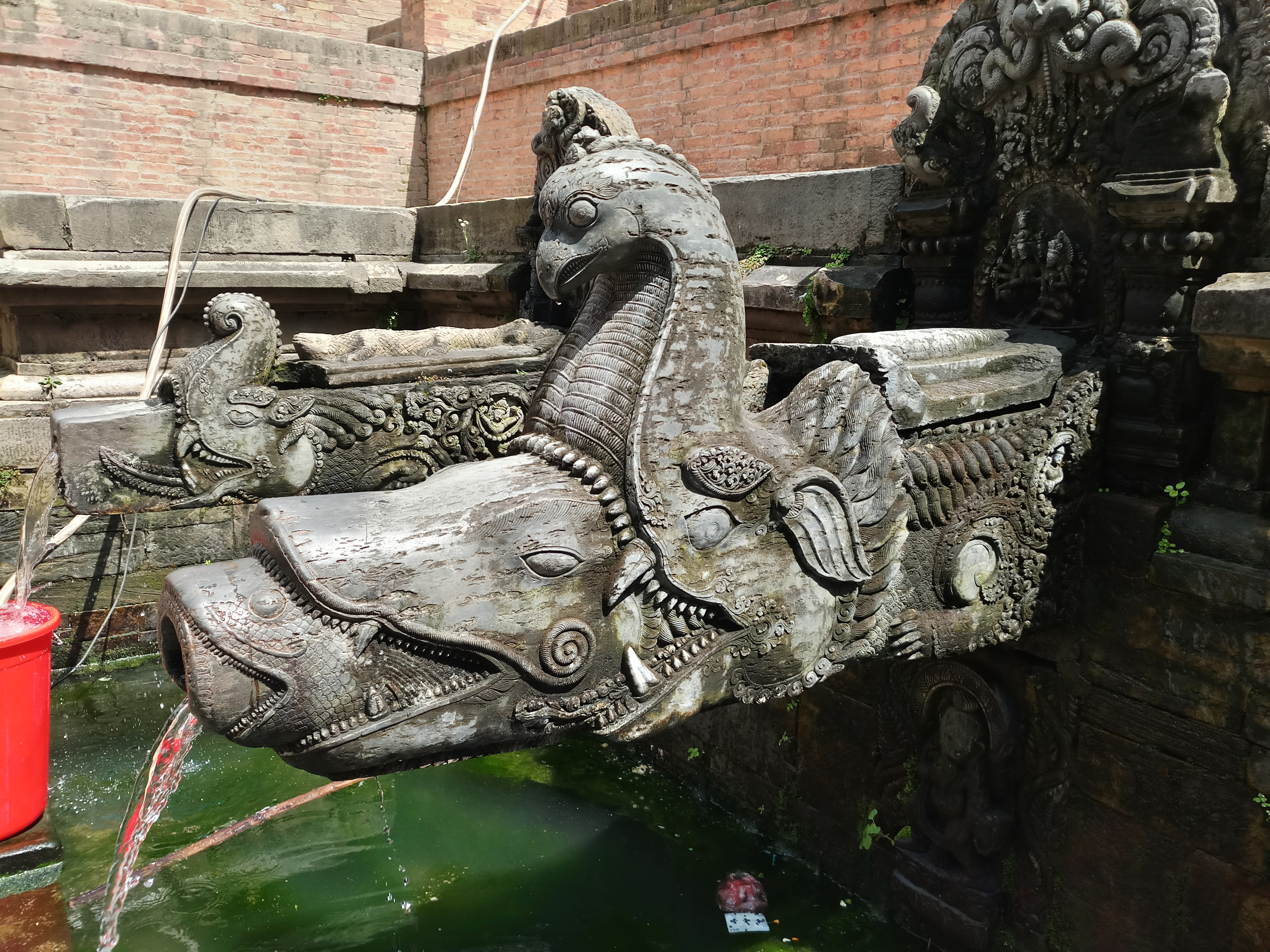
Stone spouts of Manga Hiti in Patan, with a telescopic sequence of water animals

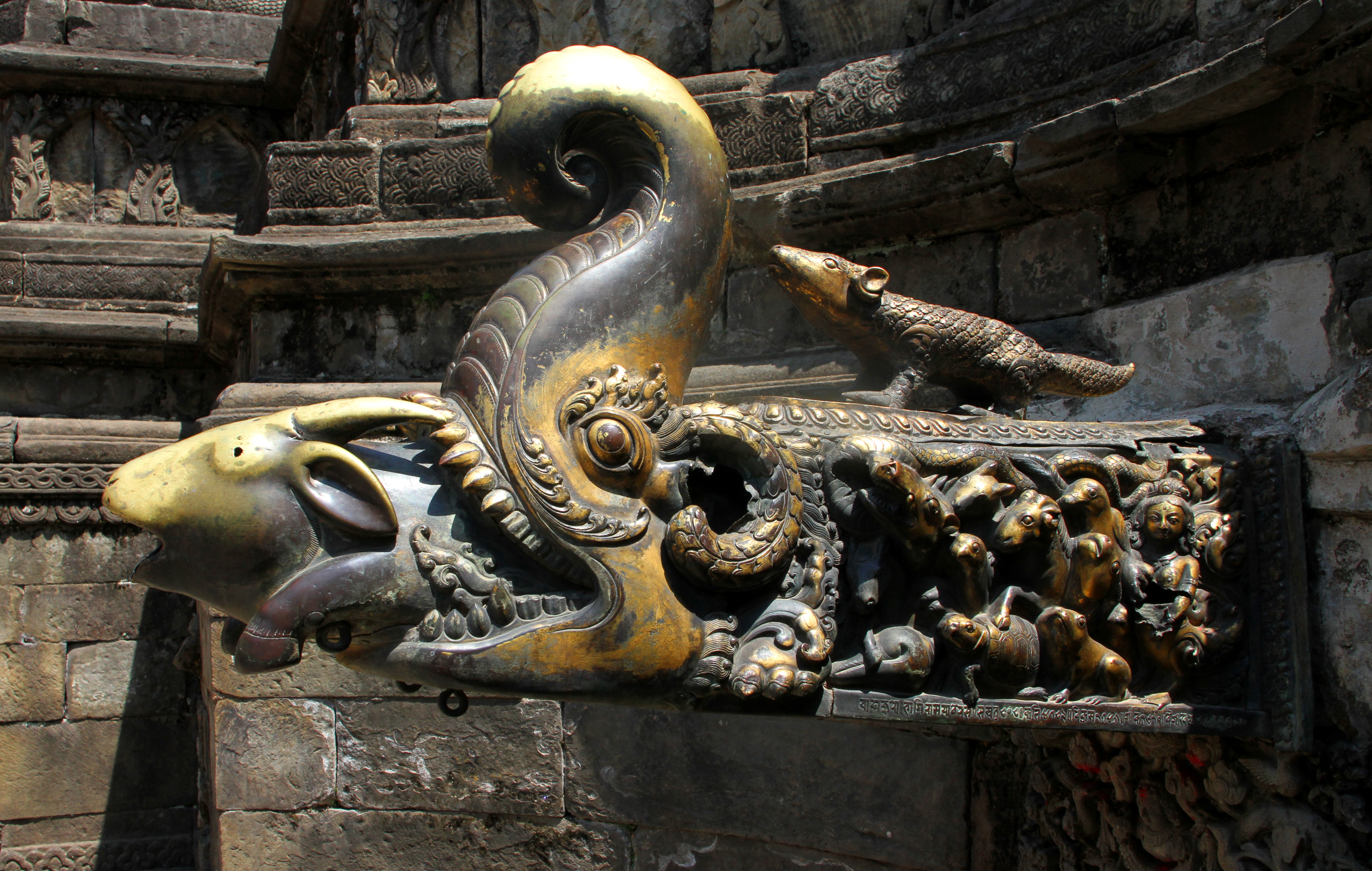
Gold spout of Nag Pokhari in Bhaktapur; a macara with a goat in its mouth

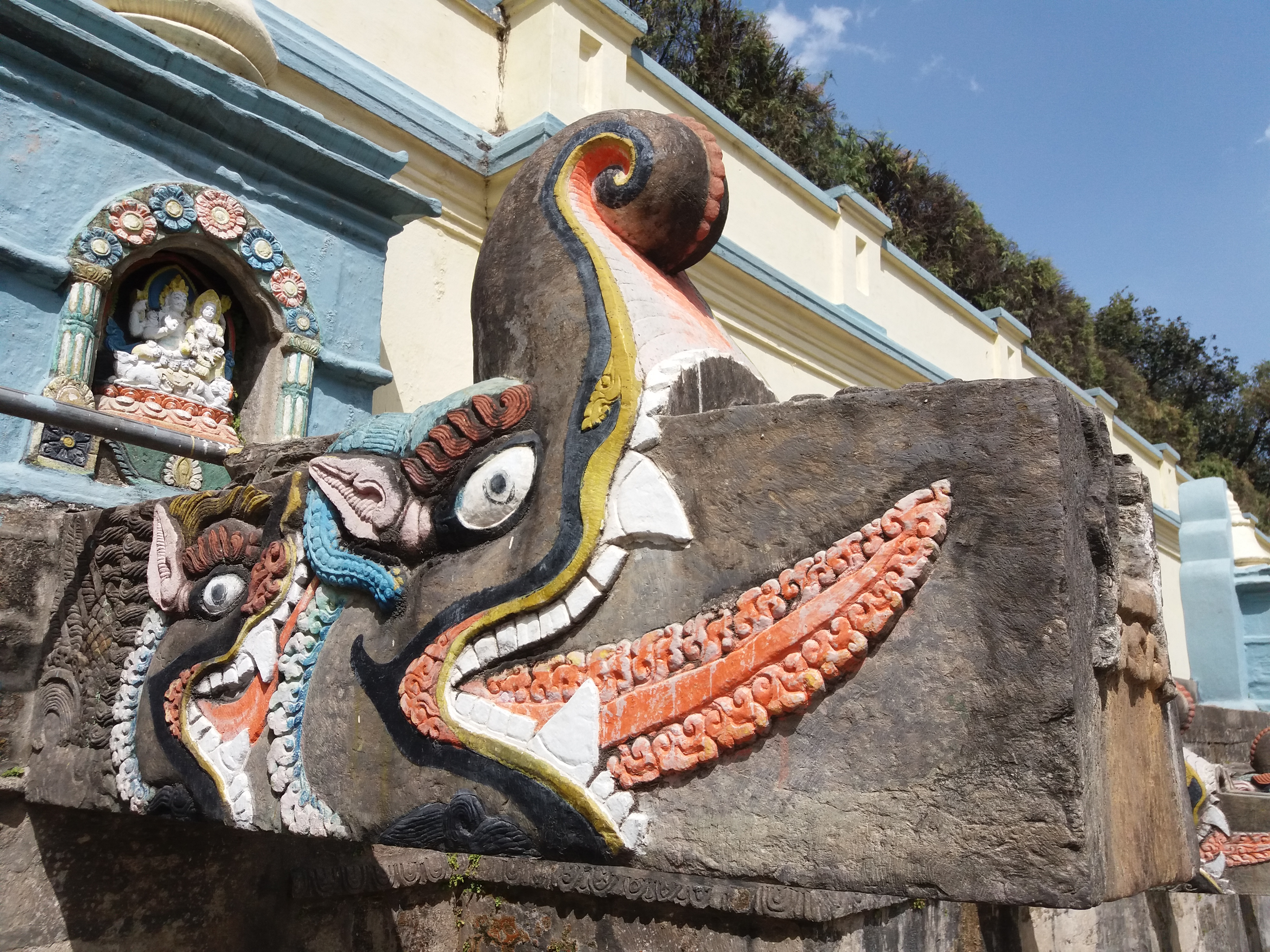
One of 22 stone spouts of Baisdhara, Balaju

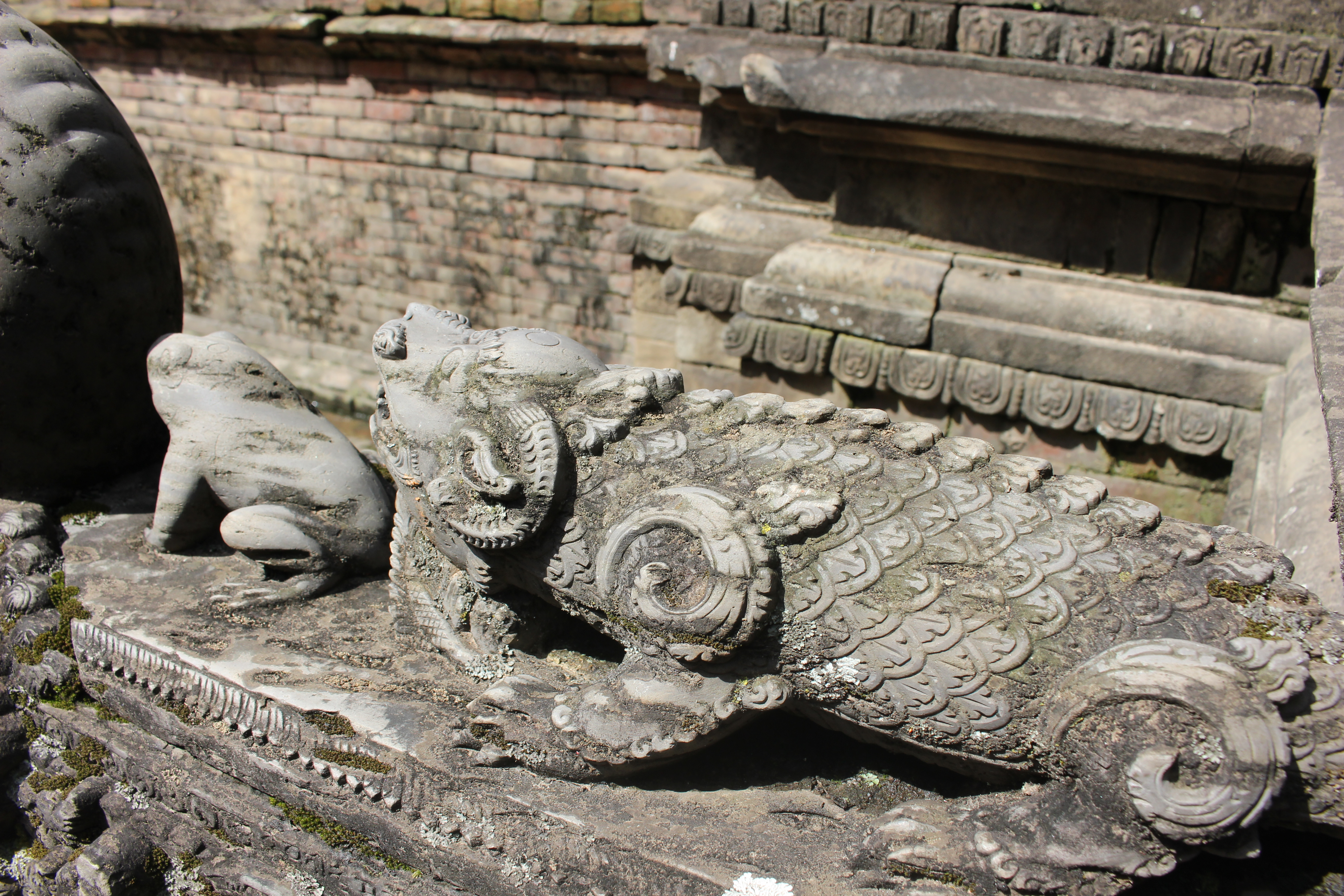
Stone lid on the spout of Layaku Hiti in Bhaktapur

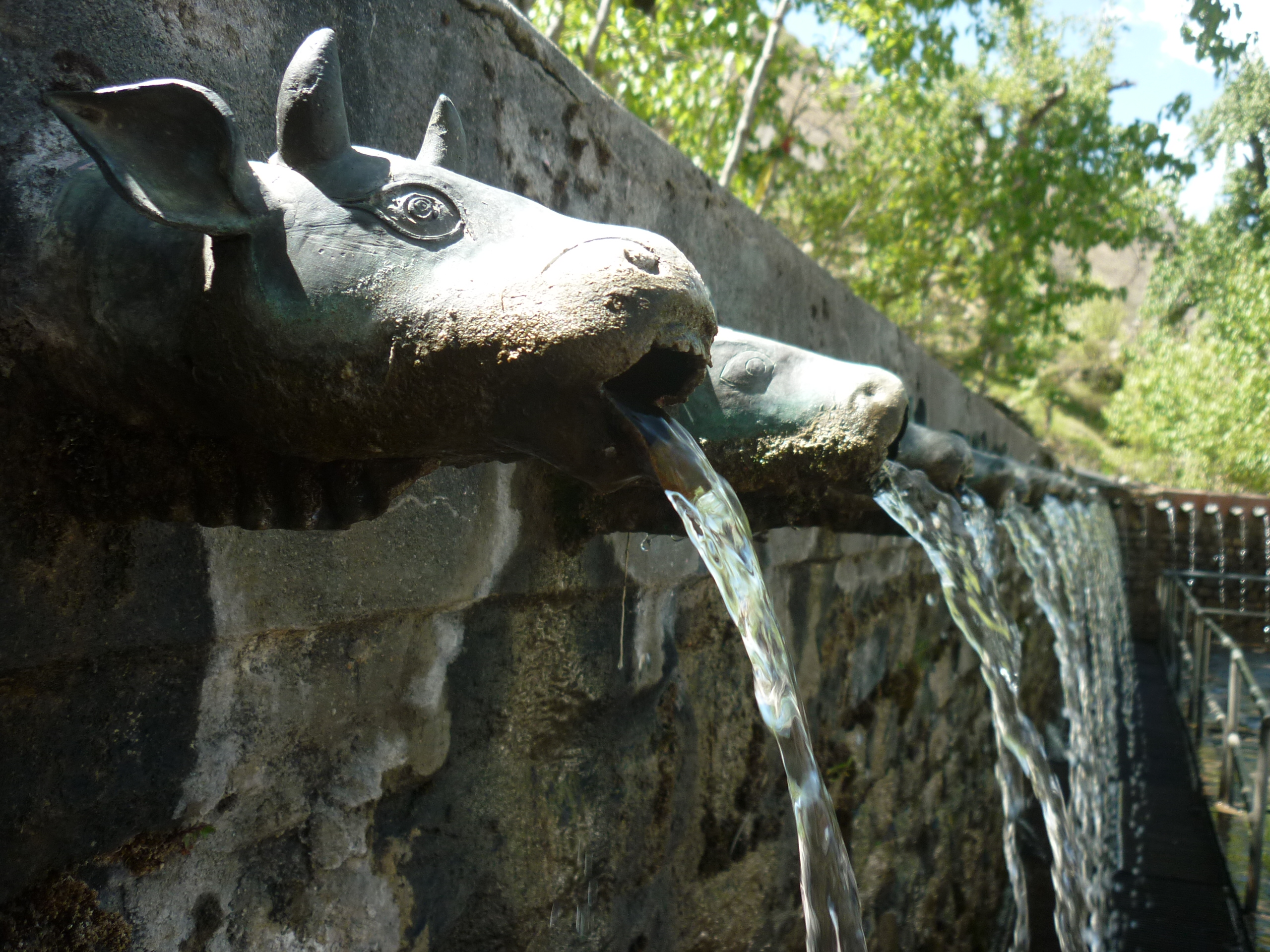
Some of the 108 brass Muktidhara

=== Basin ===
Although the names dhunge dhara and hiti refer to the actual spouts, they are also used for the stone structures immediately surrounding the spouts.

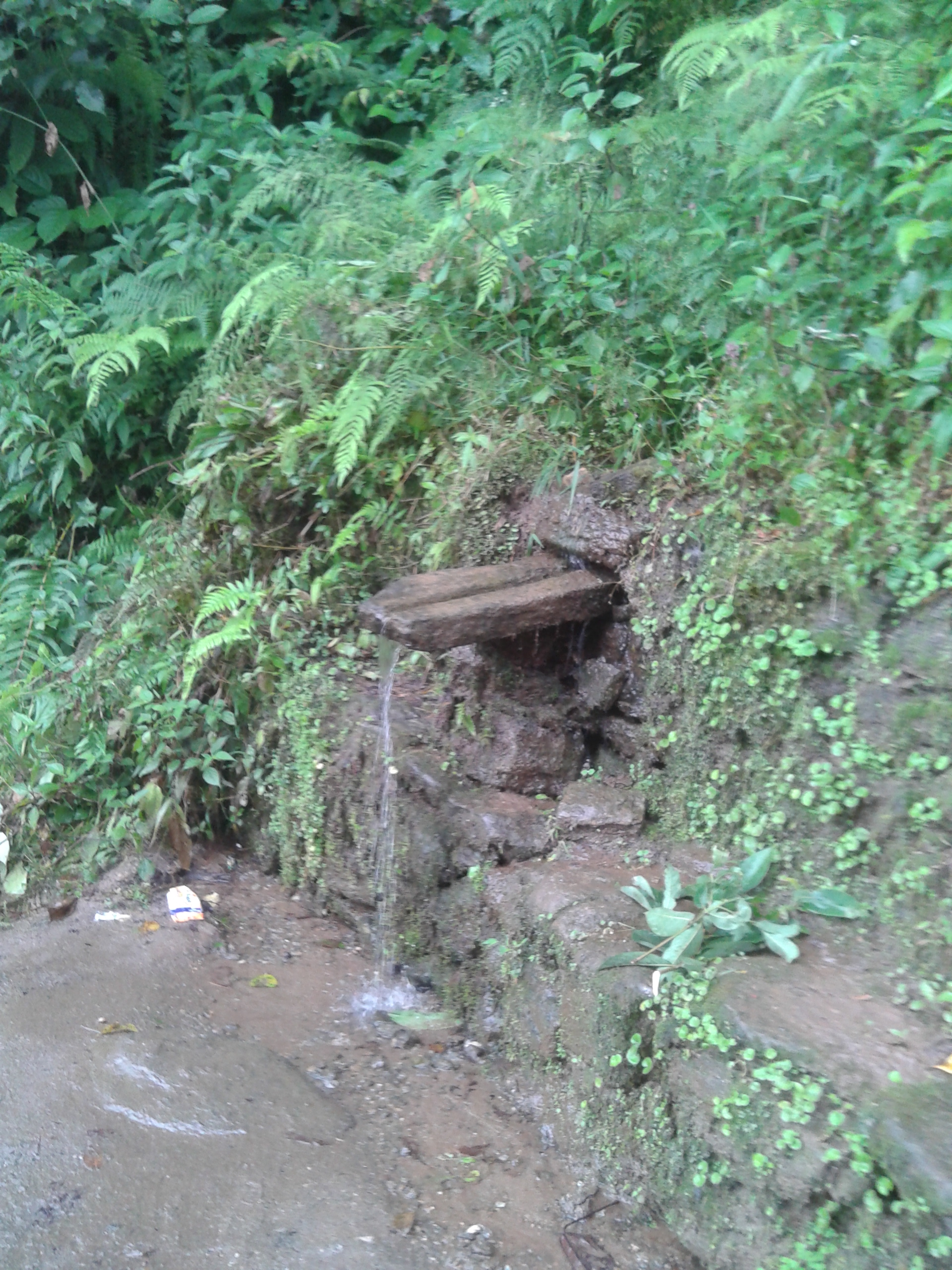
Dhunge dhara in Bhojpur District

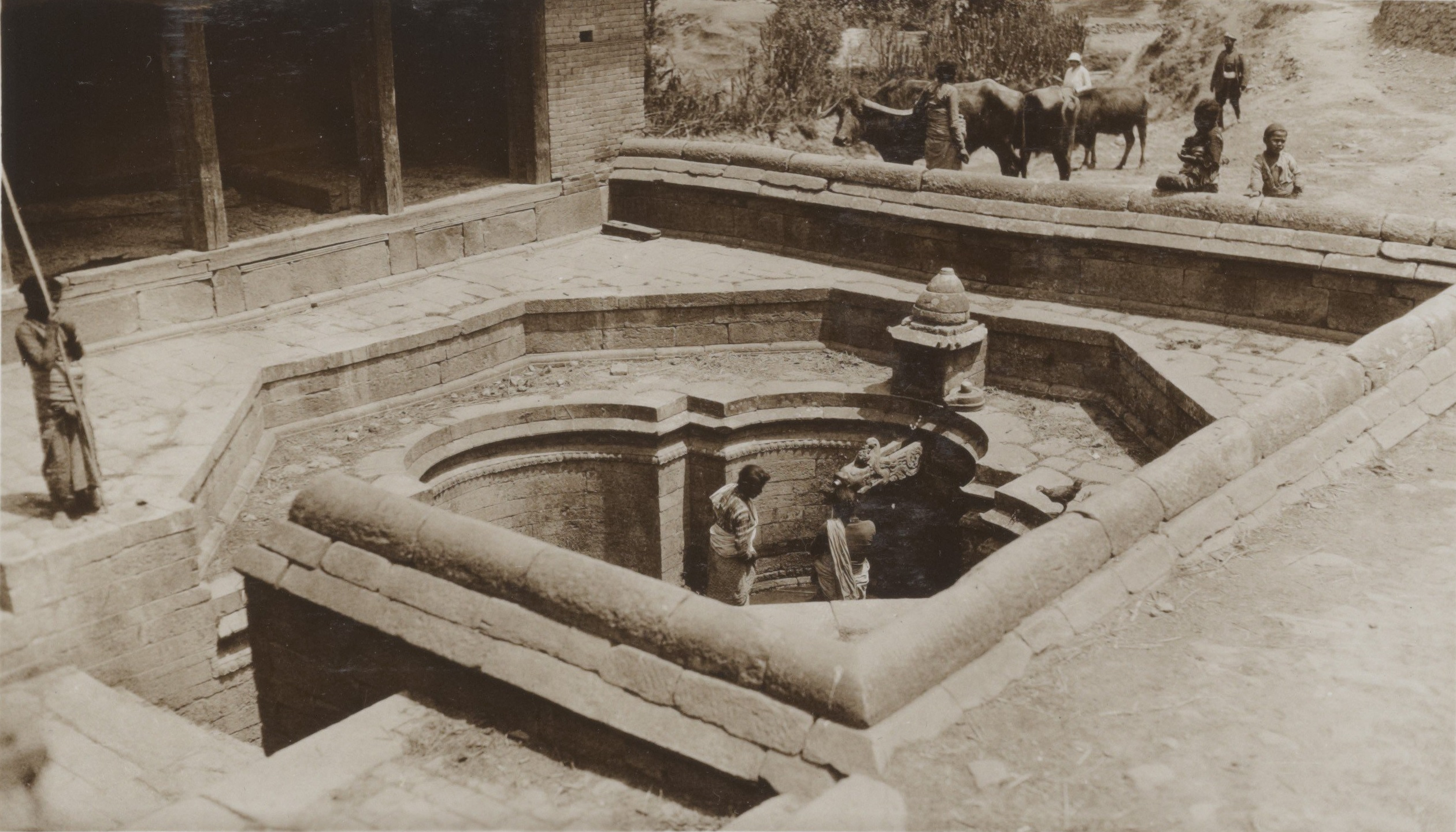
Gahiti, Changu Narayan, in 1932

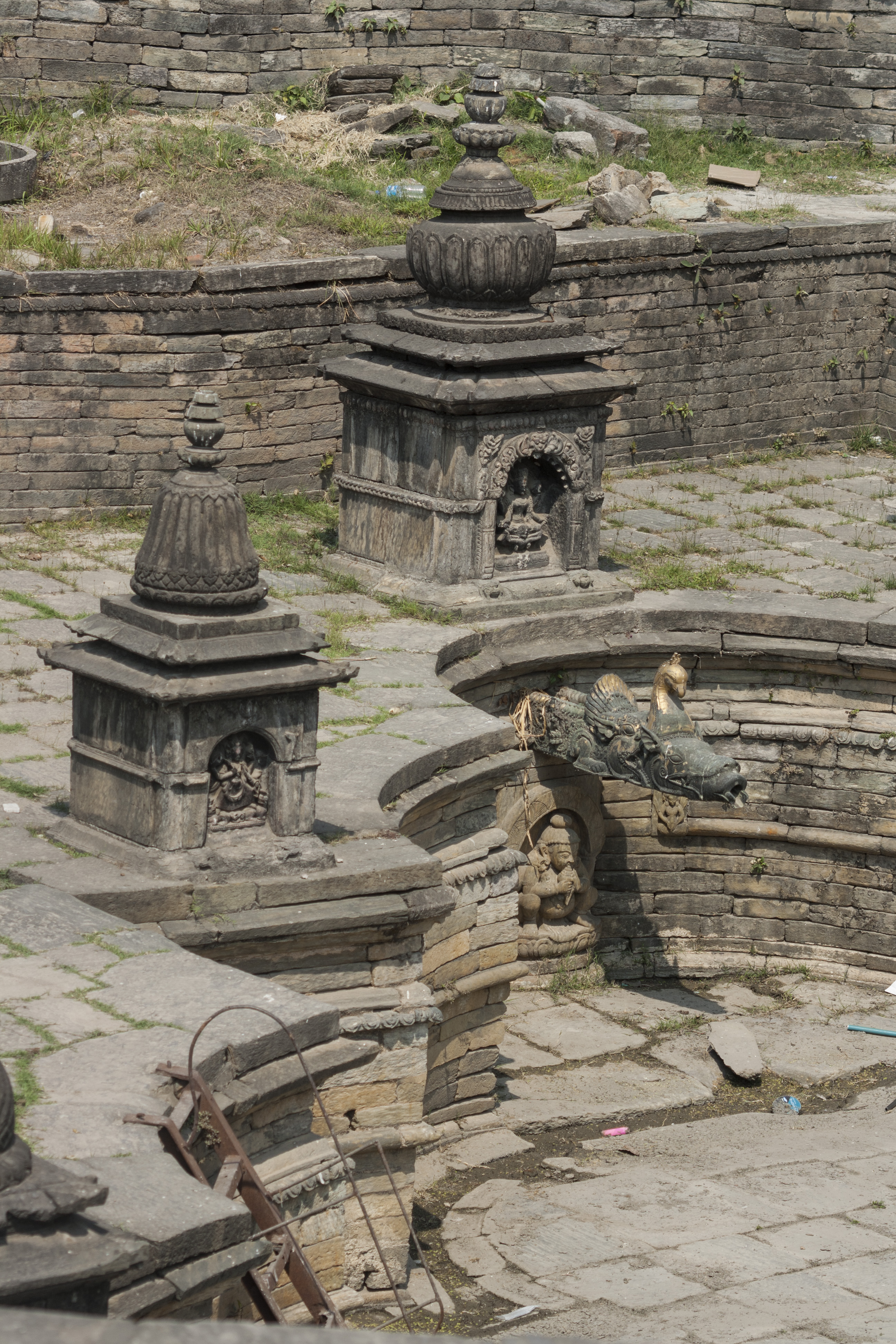
Main spout of Sundhara, Kathmandu, with Garuda shrine above and Bhagiratha sculpture underneath

In the Nepalese countryside a hiti may be no more than a stone or brick wall with a spout protruding from it, with some paving beneath the spout. In the cities, due to the natural flow of water (see below), the spouts are located in a basin below street level (hitigah), with the depth depending on need. This basin is built with a combination of stone and brick, where the floor is usually covered with stone slabs. The sides and bottom of the basin are made waterproof by coating them with a layer of kalo mato (a special type of black mud). This prevents water from the surrounding soil from seeping in. Similarly a low wall around the basin helps to keep surface runoff out and prevents debris from being carried in by the wind. Depending on the depth and overall size of the basin it can have terraces on several levels. The hiti can be accessed via one or more stone stairs.

There is typically just one spout in the basin, but there are hitis with two, three, five, nine or more spouts, even up to a hundred and eight (the Muktidhara of Muktinath in Mustang District).

Above the spout there is usually a shrine honoring a specific deity. The space below the spout is (almost without exception) adorned with a sculpture of Bhagiratha. This is especially true for dhunge dharas from the Malla period. Some of the earlier dhunge dharas display a yaksha or a pair of yakhsas, bearing the weight of the spout, instead of a Bhagiratha sculpture.

Depending on the available space, there can be any number of other votive sculptures in the basin. A combination Hindu and Buddhist sculptures, for instance a chaitya next to a lingam, can be found in many dhunge dharas of Nepal.

In front of the spout there is a small pool to catch the water flowing from it. The surplus of water eventually disappears into a drain, and is guided towards another hiti, agricultural land or a pond (to be used for irrigation and other purposes). Sometimes the water is first directed towards several other hitis. In the case of Washa Hiti in Patan, for example, the water is first flowing towards Amrit Hiti, then to Dathu Hiti, then to Buincha Hiti.

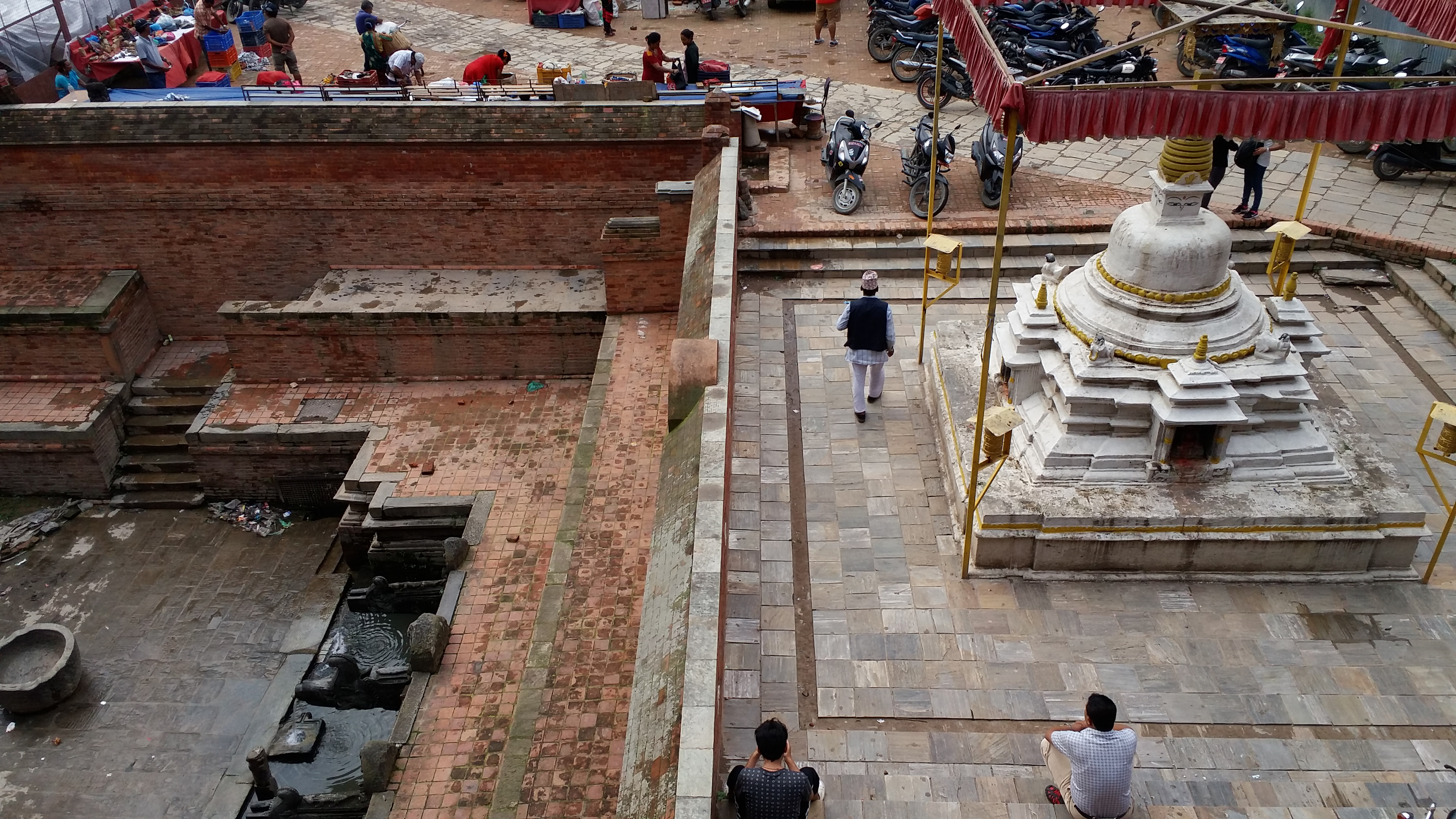
The Chaitya at Manga Hiti is suspected to be on top of the hiti's filter system

In some hitis the water from the spout drains into a pond inside the hiti basin itself. Nag Pokhari hiti in Bhaktapur is an example of this. Just as there are hitis with a pond inside them, there are also ponds with spouts integrated into their walls. Bhandarkhal Pokhari in Patan and Salan Ganesh Pokhari in Bhaktapur are some examples.

Several hitis have an integrated stone drinking water reservoir (jahru) built into their walls and some have a well (tun) dug into their basin floor as an alternative means to obtain the available water (see below).

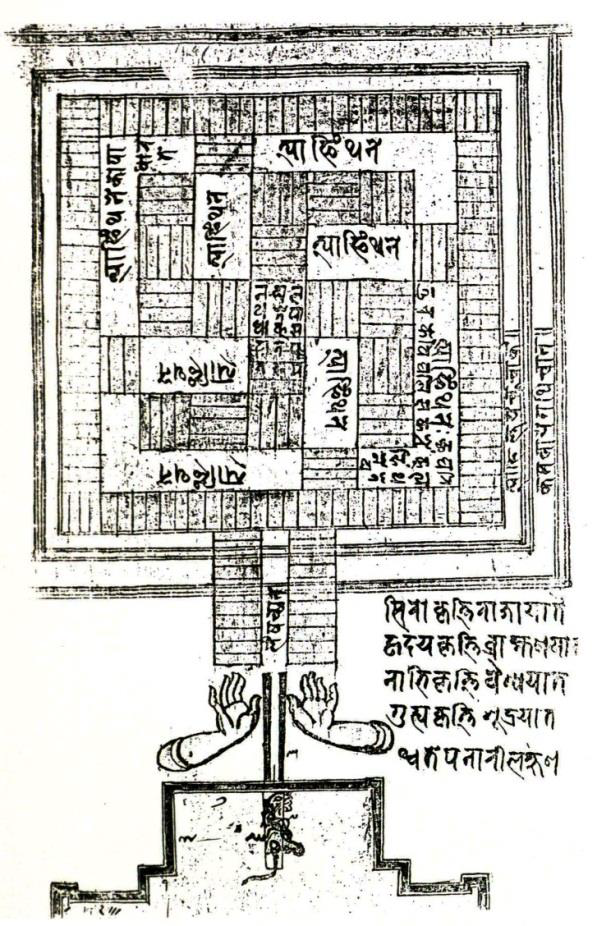
Ancient Nepalese drawing of a hiti, with emphasis on the navi mandal

=== Subterranean structures ===
In a typical dhunge dhara the water from the aquifer (see below) is collected in an underground infiltration chamber (navi mandal). From there it is transported to the basin of the dhunge dhara through underground pipes (hiti du), made of terracotta, wood or clay.

The water pipes consist of a series of interlocked, (usually) terracotta, u-shaped segments. The open top is covered with brick or wooden planks. To avoid contamination from the surrounding soil, the pipes, and especially the seams between the different parts, are covered with a special type of clay or red soil. Since the segments are straight, a solution had to be found in cases where a bend in the pipe was needed. In Nagbahal Hiti in Patan this problem was solved by placing stone or brick bowls between the segments of pipe.

The pipes can be found on depths of 1 to 5 metres (16 ft). Similar technology has been used for the drains.

Before the water enters the spout, it passes a filter system, using gravel, sand, charcoal and sometimes lapsi (Nepali hog plum). The filter can be either a sand filter or a settling basin filter. In the first case the water passes through a series of stone bowls, containing filter media from course to fine. In the second case the water also flows through a number stone bowls, but now the holes are located only slightly below the brim of the bowl. In this way any debris from the water remains on the bottom of the bowls.

=== Dharmashalas ===
Many hitis are closely associated with one or more dharmashalas (shelters or public resthouses). There are several types of these, for instance a pati, a mandapa or a satah. Such a shelter is either a separate building close by or connected to one of the walls of the hiti. Manga Hiti and Saugah Hiti in Patan have two on either side of the stairs, for example, and the main entrance of Bhimsen Hiti in Bhaktapur is through the shelter.

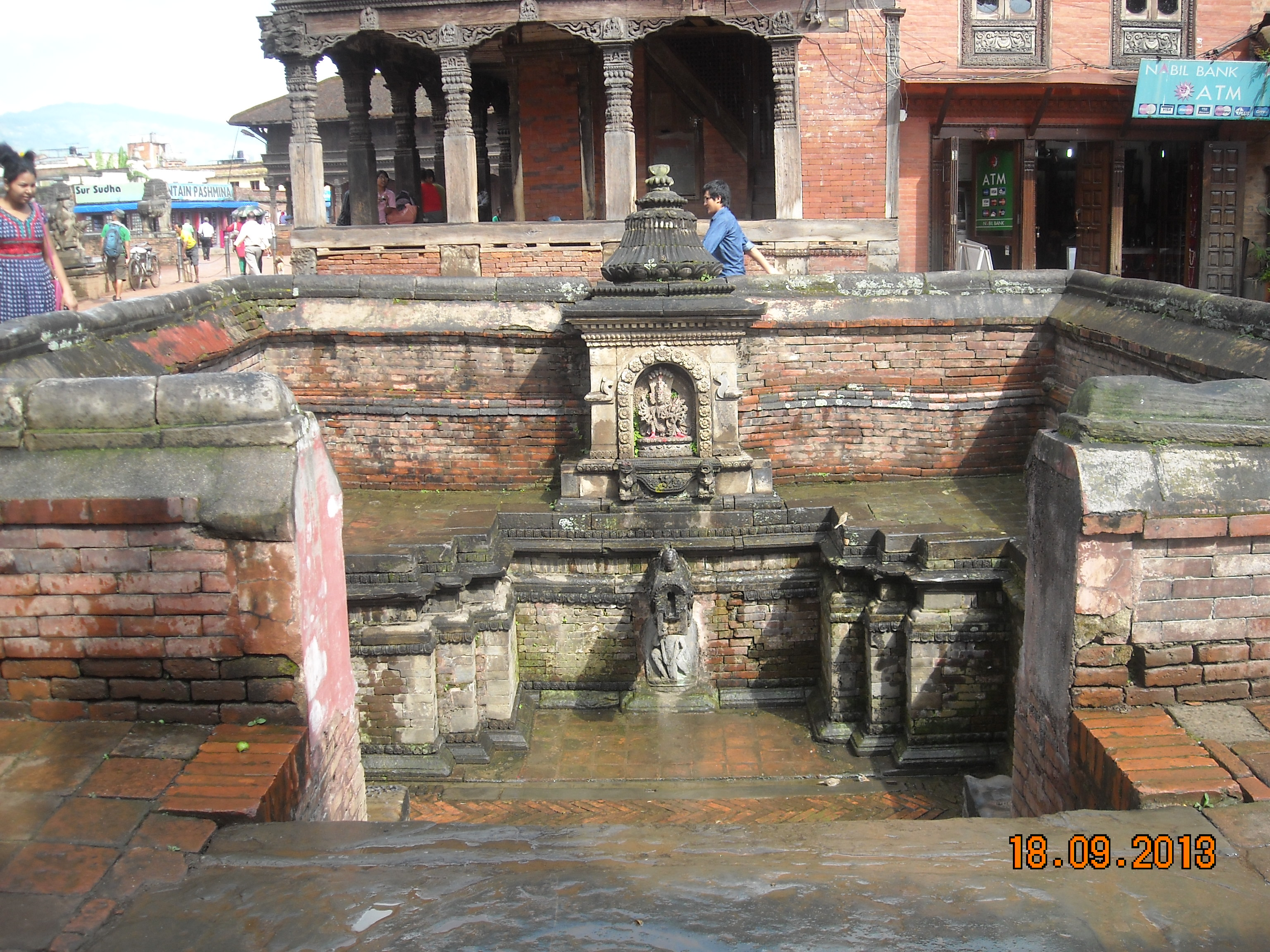
Layaku Hiti in Bhaktapur, with Hari Shankar Sattal

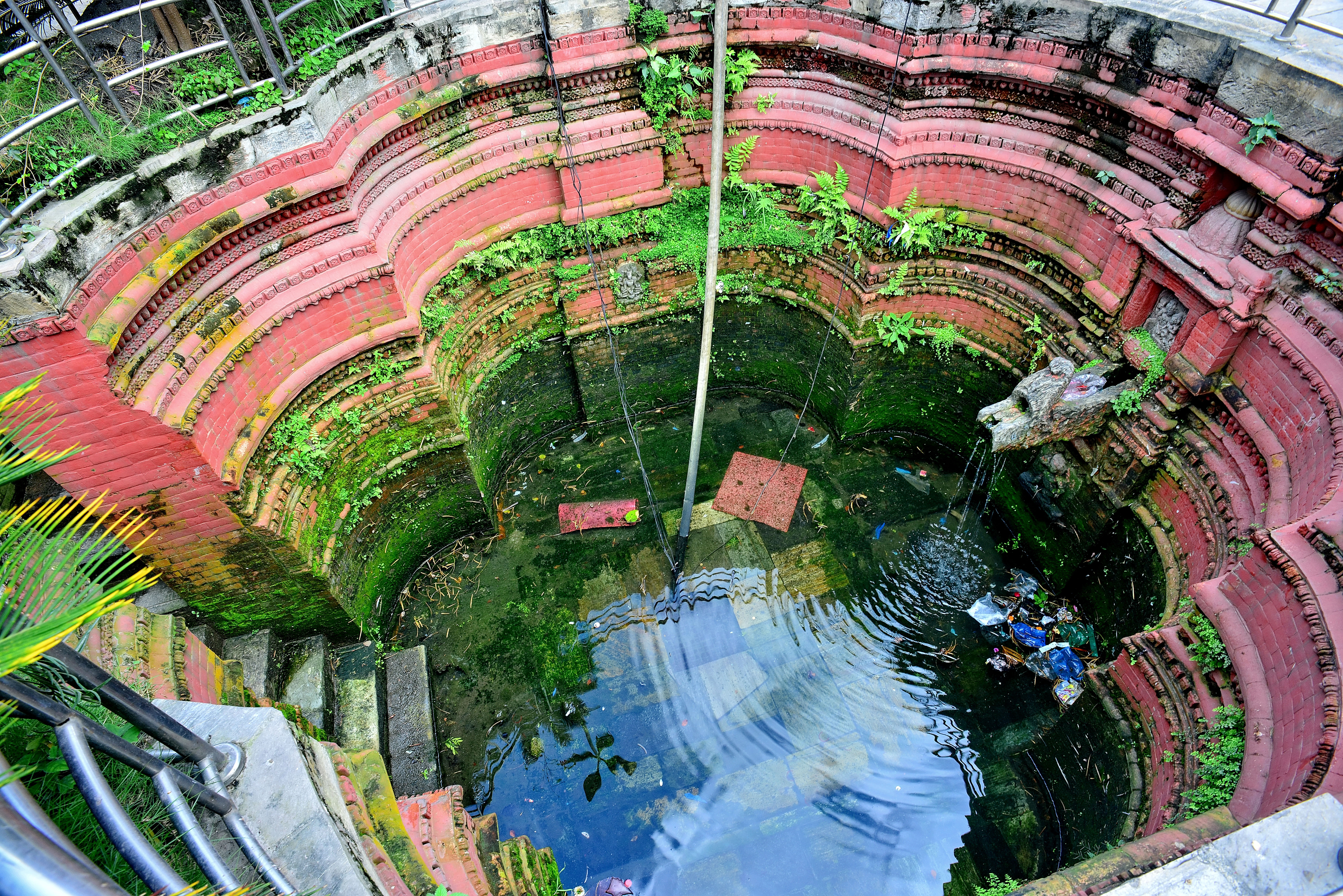
Naxaldhara in Kathmandu. The drain is defective

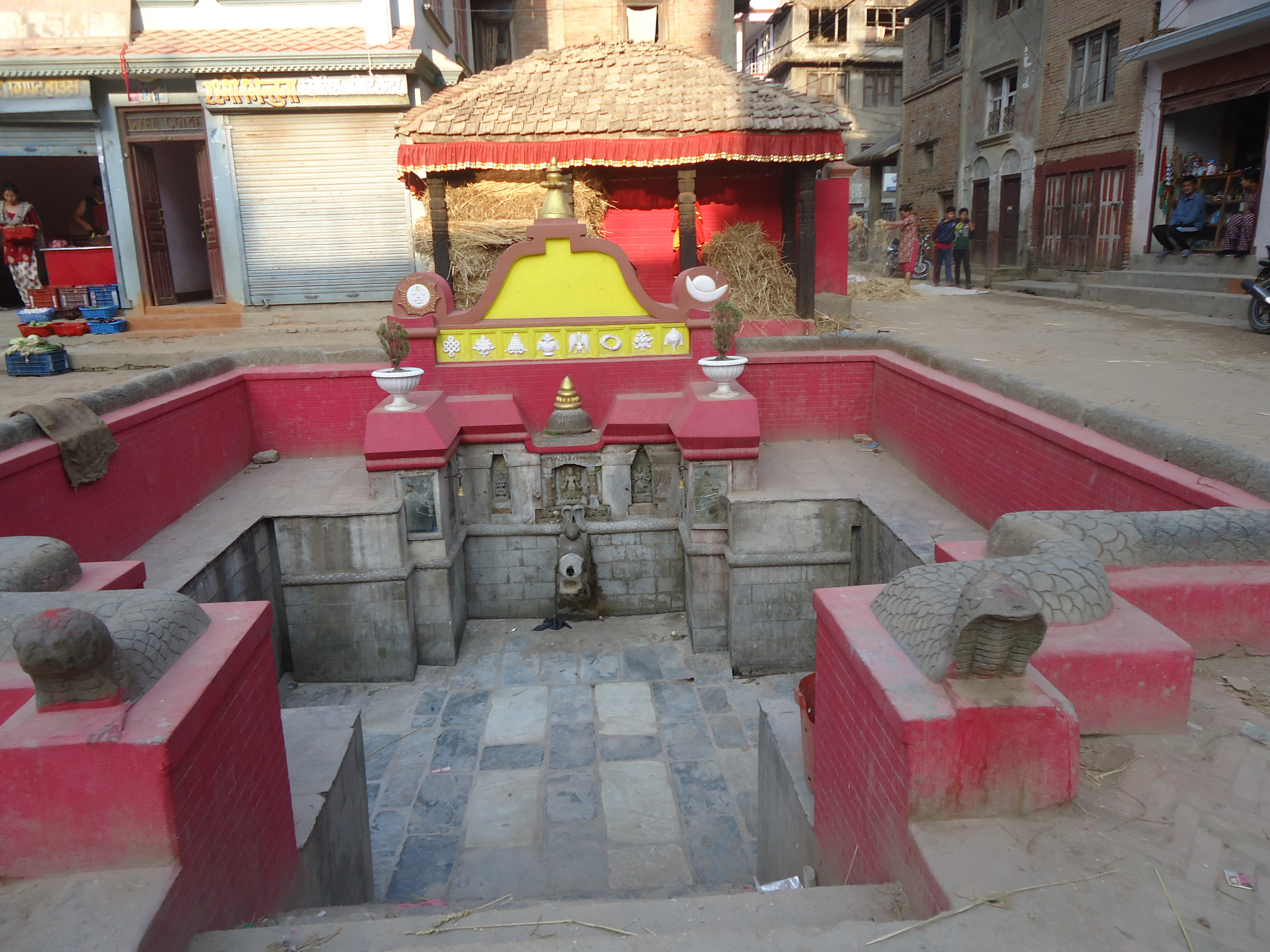
Lunhiti in Tapa Lachhi, with pati behind it

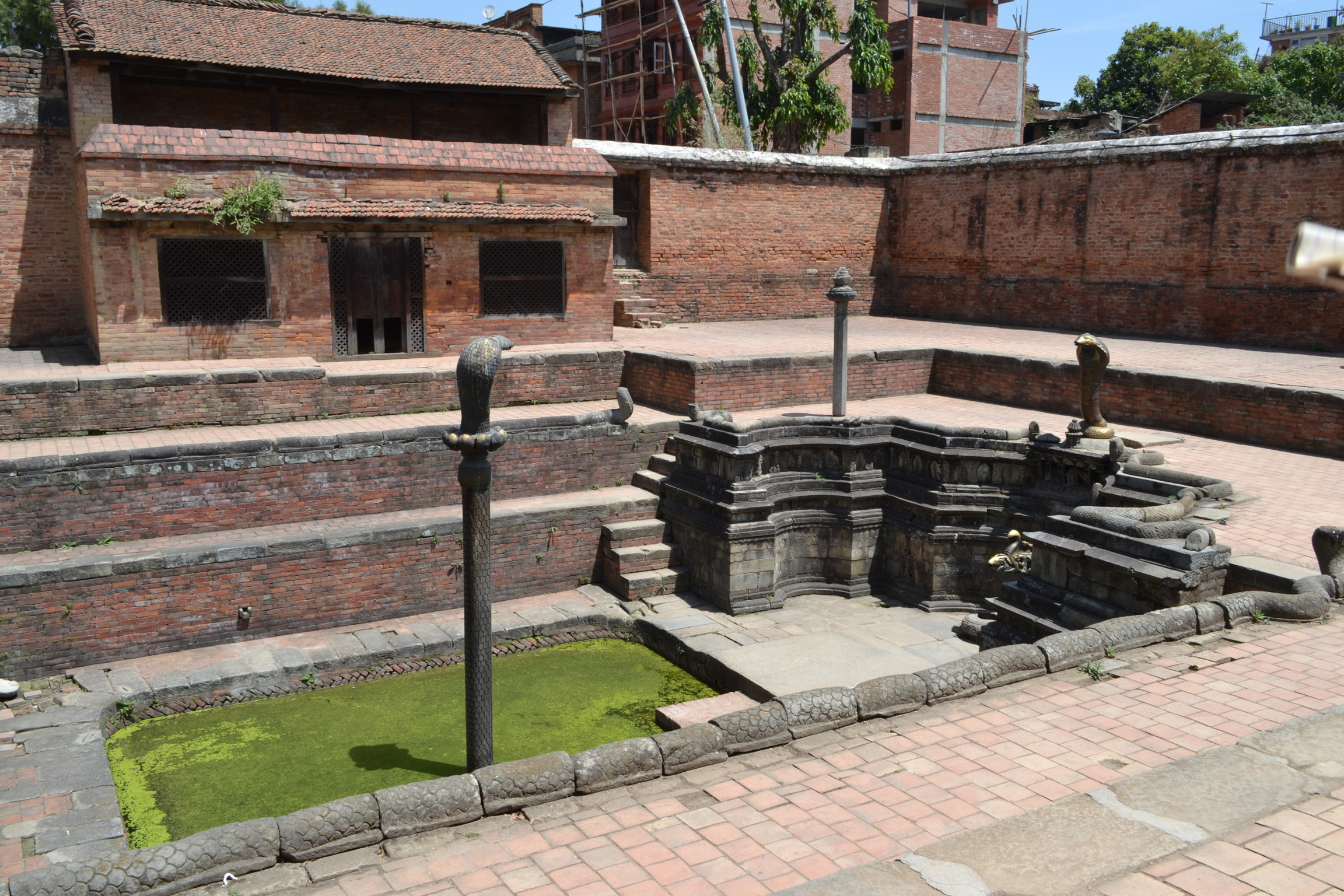
Nag Pokhari hiti with a pond inside, Bhaktapur

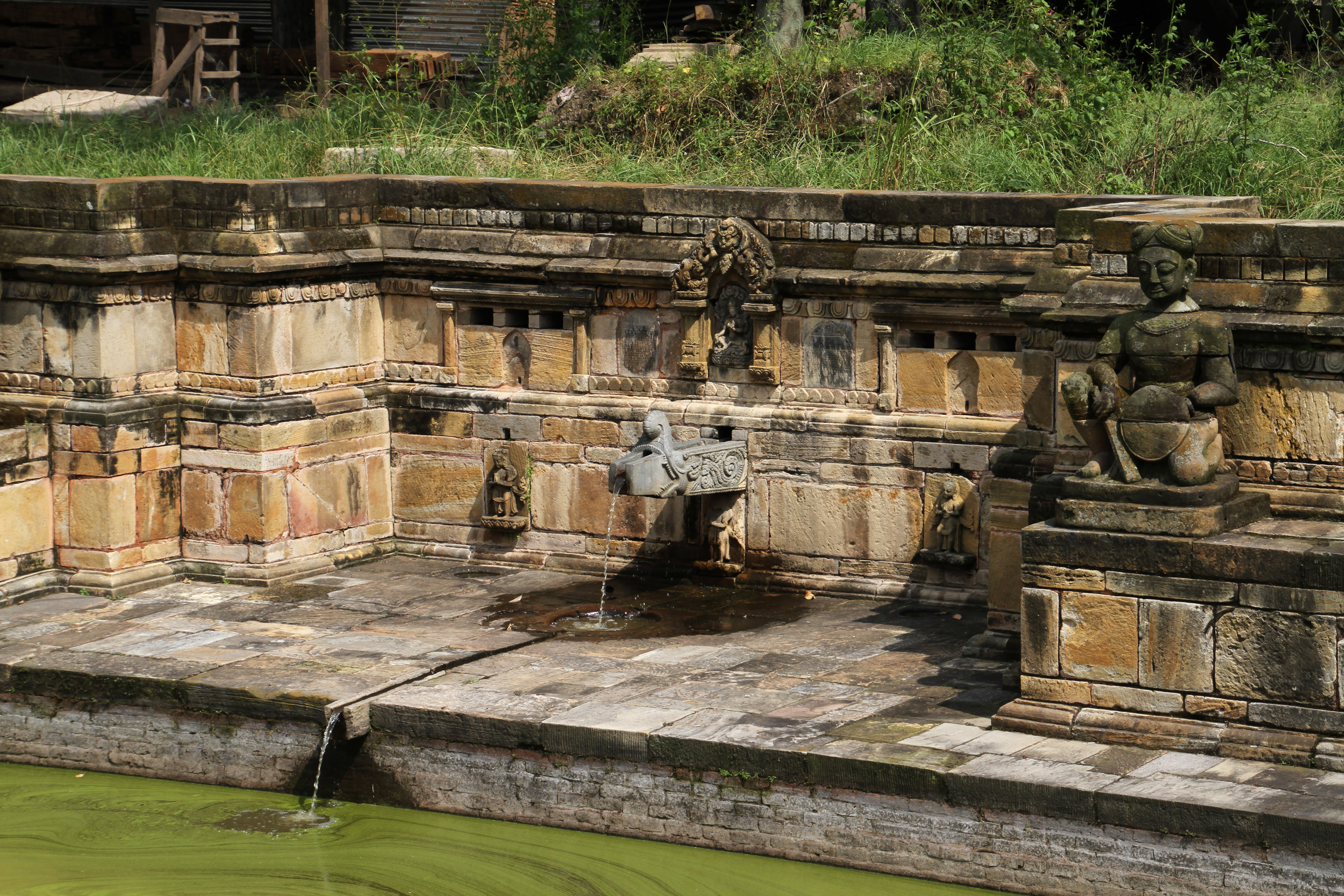
Spout and jahrus of Bhandarkhal Pokhari in Patan

== Water sources ==
Early hitis use water from their own springs or from nearby aquifers, sometimes shared with other hitis. Thapa Hiti, Tangal Hiti and Tusha Hiti in Patan, for instance, receive water from the same source. Later, hitis were connected to a system of canals and ponds, which brought fresh water from the foothills of Kathmandu Valley to the cities.

The spouts of one hiti can also have different water sources, such as Alko Hiti in Patan which has three sources confirmed during restoration. In other hitis, users have merely noticed a difference between the spouts in the taste or colour of the water. For many hitis, the precise location of the source is still unknown.

=== Ponds ===
During the Kirata Kingdom (c. 900 BC-300 AD) ponds (named pukhu or pokhari) were constructed as a source of water in the old cities of the Kathmandu Valley. The ponds got their water from rainfall. During the Lichhavi regime, these ponds were linked to stone spouts and dug wells to supply water to the cities.

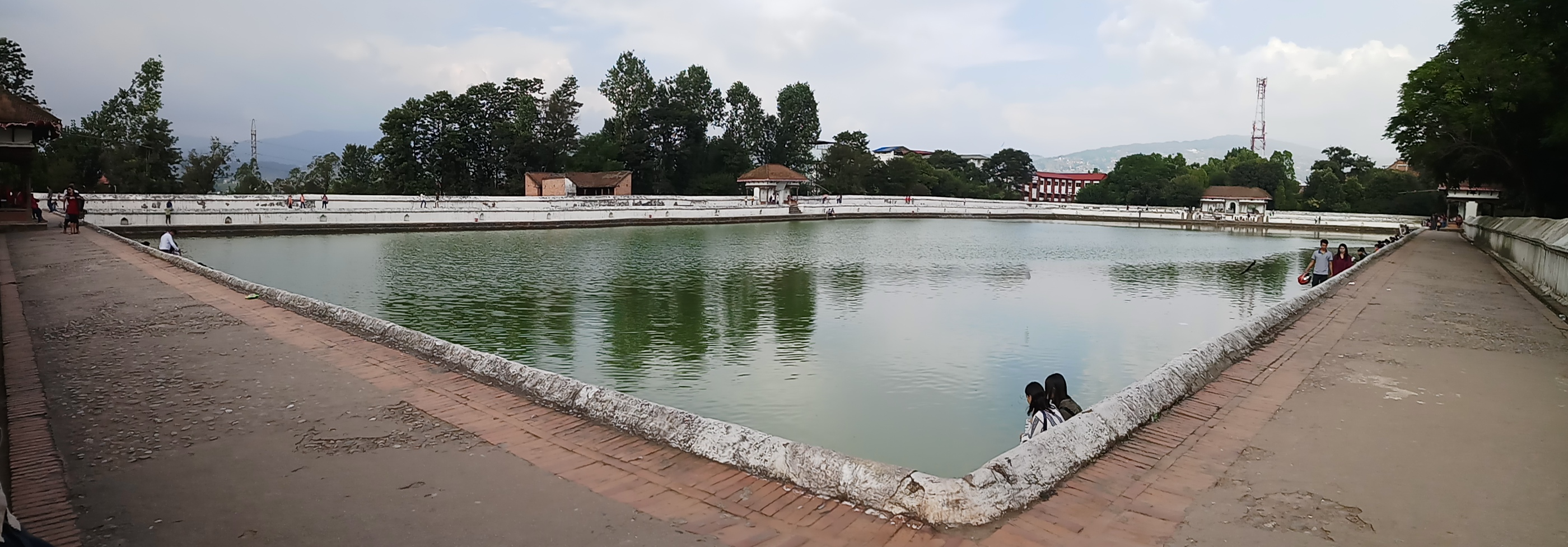
Siddha Pokhari in Bhaktapur is one of the larger reservoirs

Some ponds were built higher in the settlements to feed the shallow aquifers; water seeps away from the ponds into the ground and eventually emerges from the spouts. These higher ponds are relatively large in size. Lainchaur Pokhari, Rani Pokhari and Ikha Pukhu in Kathmandu, Siddha Pokhari, Kamal Binayak Pukhu and Nā Pukhu in Bhaktapur and Nhu Pukhu, Paleswan Pukhu and Jyawalkhyo Pukhu in Patan are examples of such ponds. Some had their own springs, like Siddha Pokahri, Rani Pokhari and Jyawalakhyo Pukhu.

The ponds inside the settlements are smaller. They help to increase the local groundwater levels. They are used for washing, cleaning, duck farming, bathing animals and fighting fires. In Kathmandu these ponds have disappeared completely. Tekha Pukhu is an example of such ponds in Bhaktapur. In Patan, Pimbahal Pokhari is one example.

Chyasa Pukhu, Guita Pukhu and Tyagah Pukhu in Patan are some of the downstream ponds. Water from stone spouts and surface drains flows into these ponds. During the dry season, most of them become dry.

Some of the ponds are interconnected; when one is filled completely, the overflow is directed towards another pond and so forth. La Pokhari, Palesvan Pukhu, Podepukhu and Pimbahal Pokhari are an example of such a chain of ponds in Patan. In this way, an elaborate network of water bodies is created as a water resource during the dry season and to help alleviate the water pressure caused by the monsoon rains.

At one point in time there was a total of 90 ponds in the large cities of Kathmandu Valley: 30 in Bhaktapur, 39 in Patan and 21 in Kathmandu. The 2019 survey by the KVWSMB found a total of 233 ponds on record in the ten municipalities of the Kathmandu Valley. 40 of these ponds have disappeared. The remaining 193 ponds occupy a surface of 254,377.75 square metres and contain 988,829,755 litres of water.

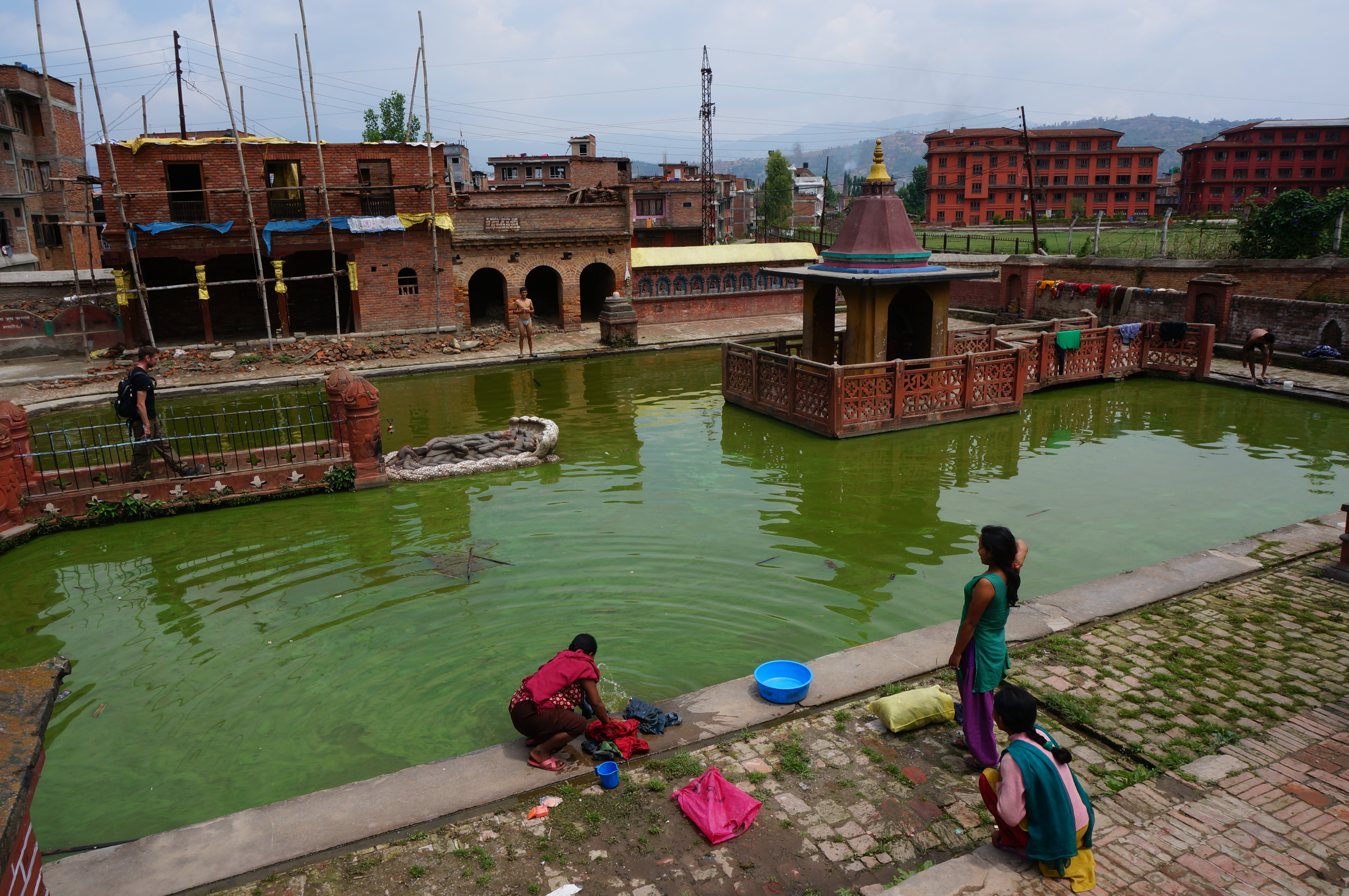
Washing in Khya:h Pukhu, Bhaktapur

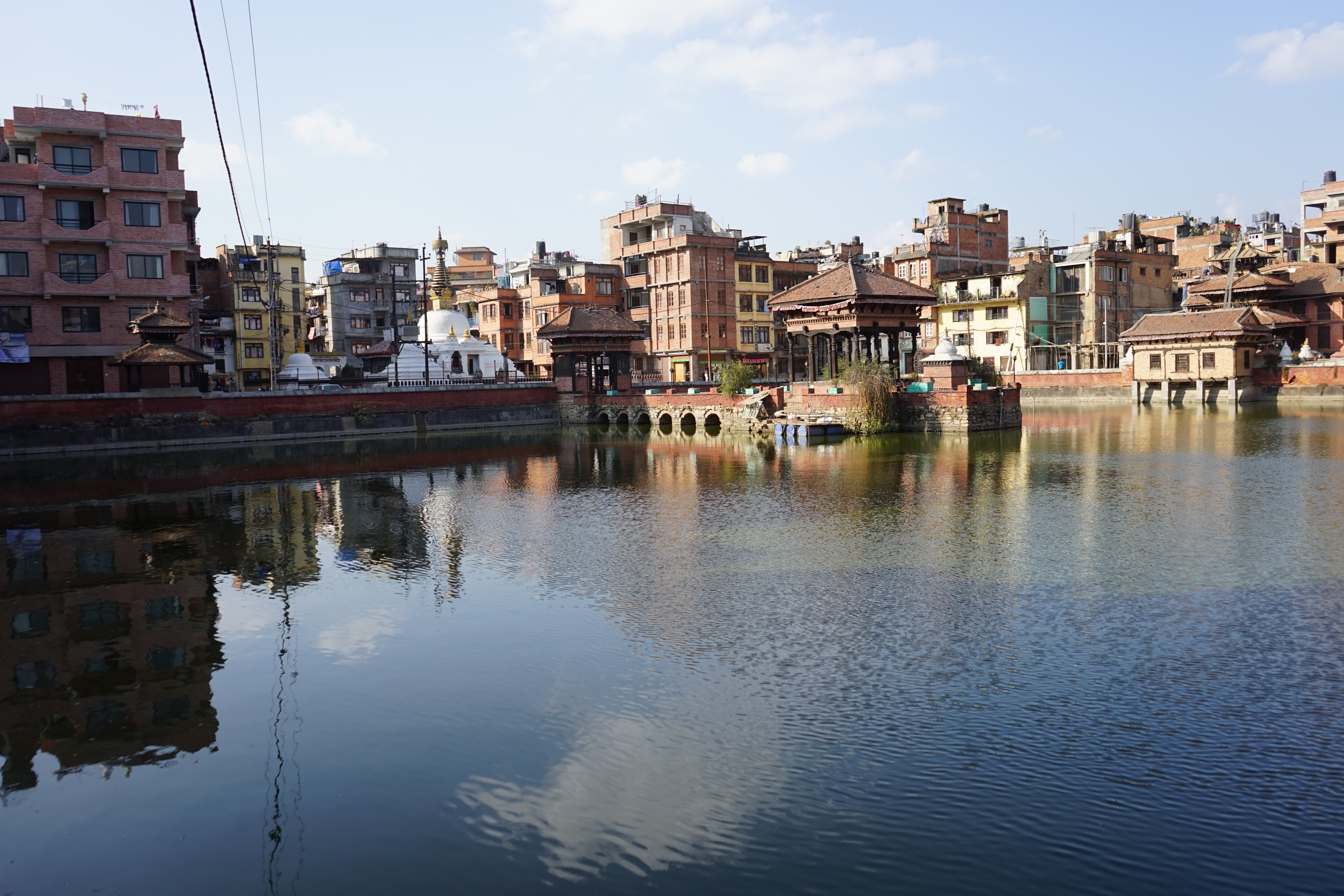
Pimbahal Pokhari, Patan

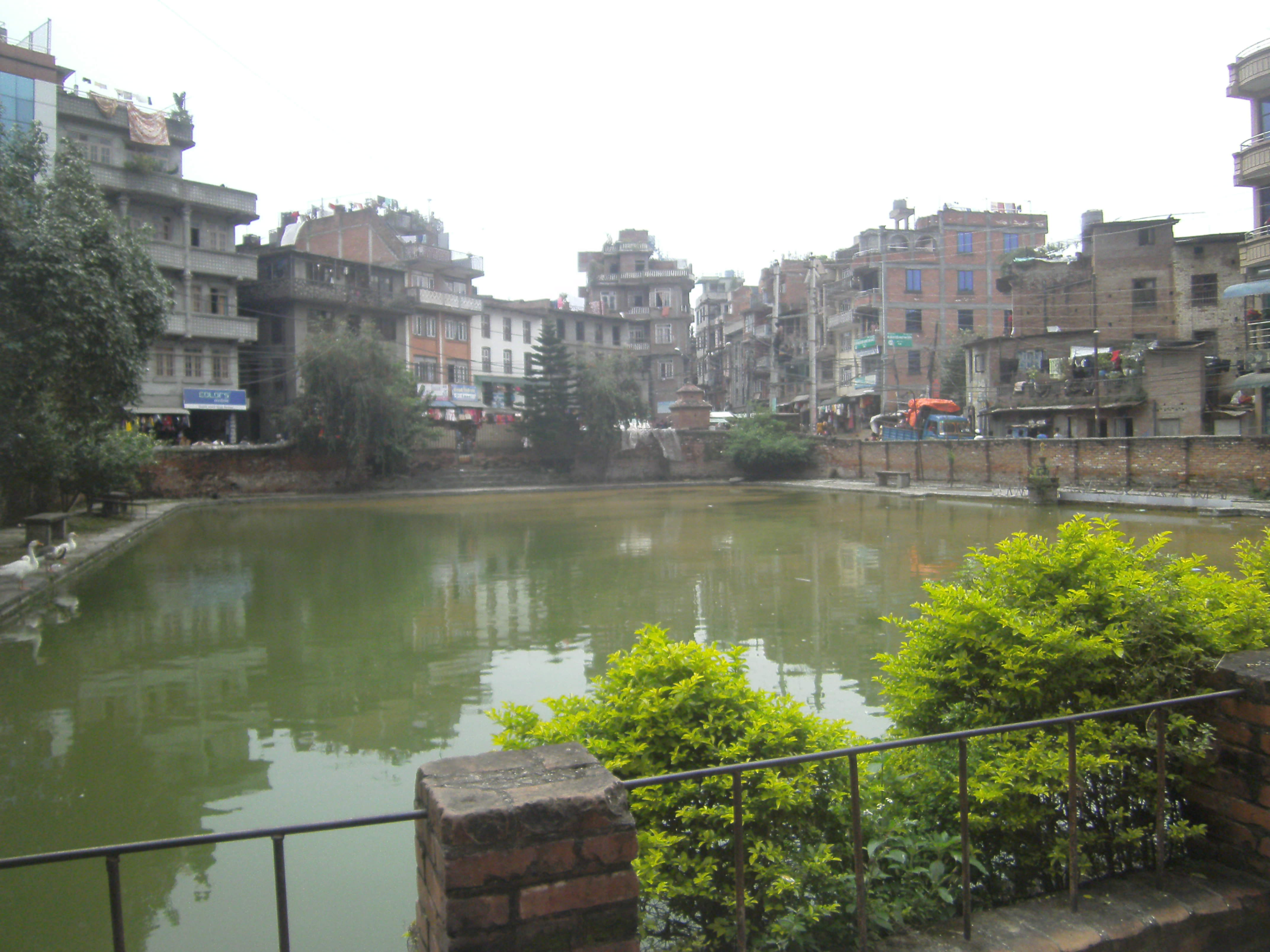
Thara Pukhu, Banepa

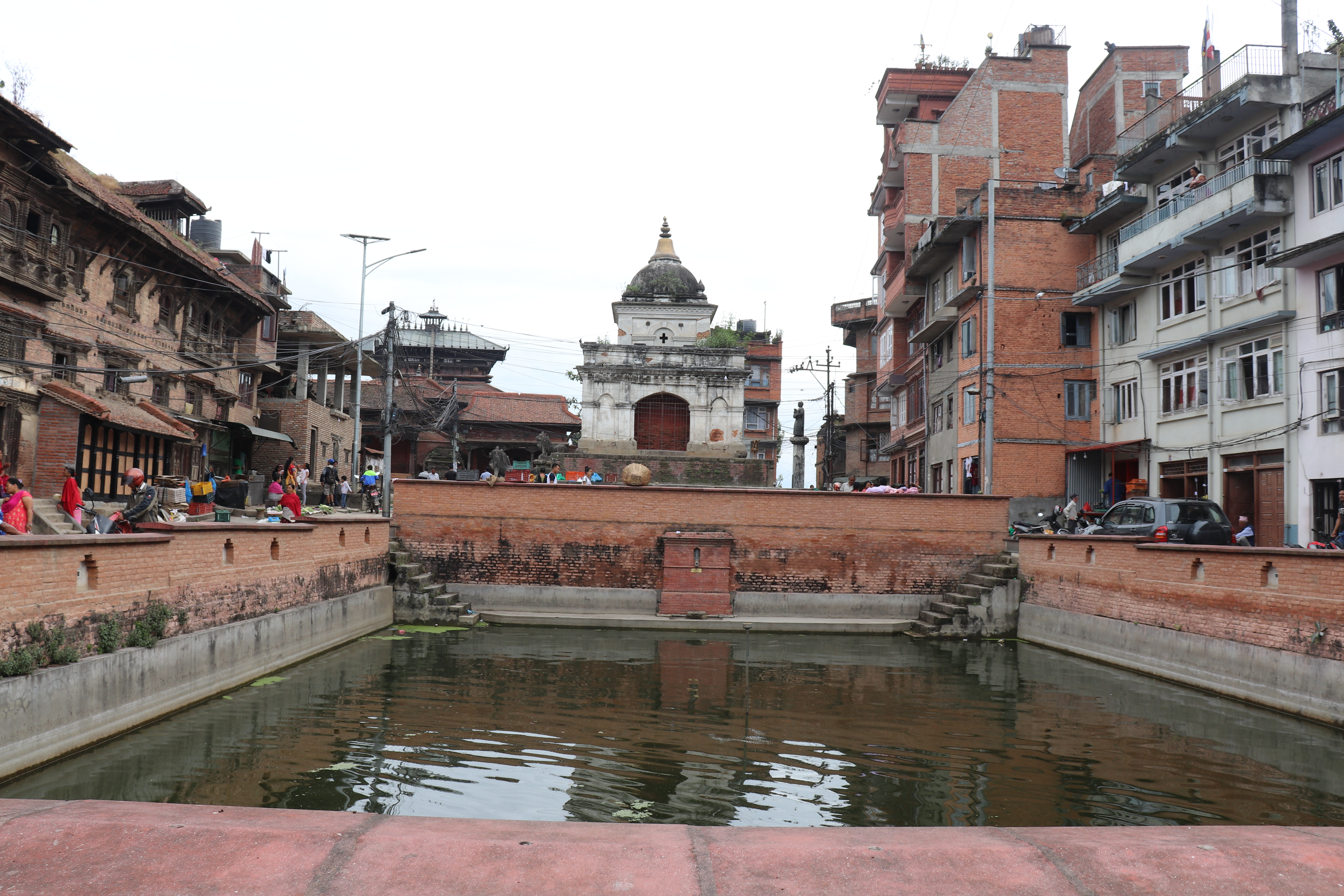
Dev Pukhu, Kirtipur

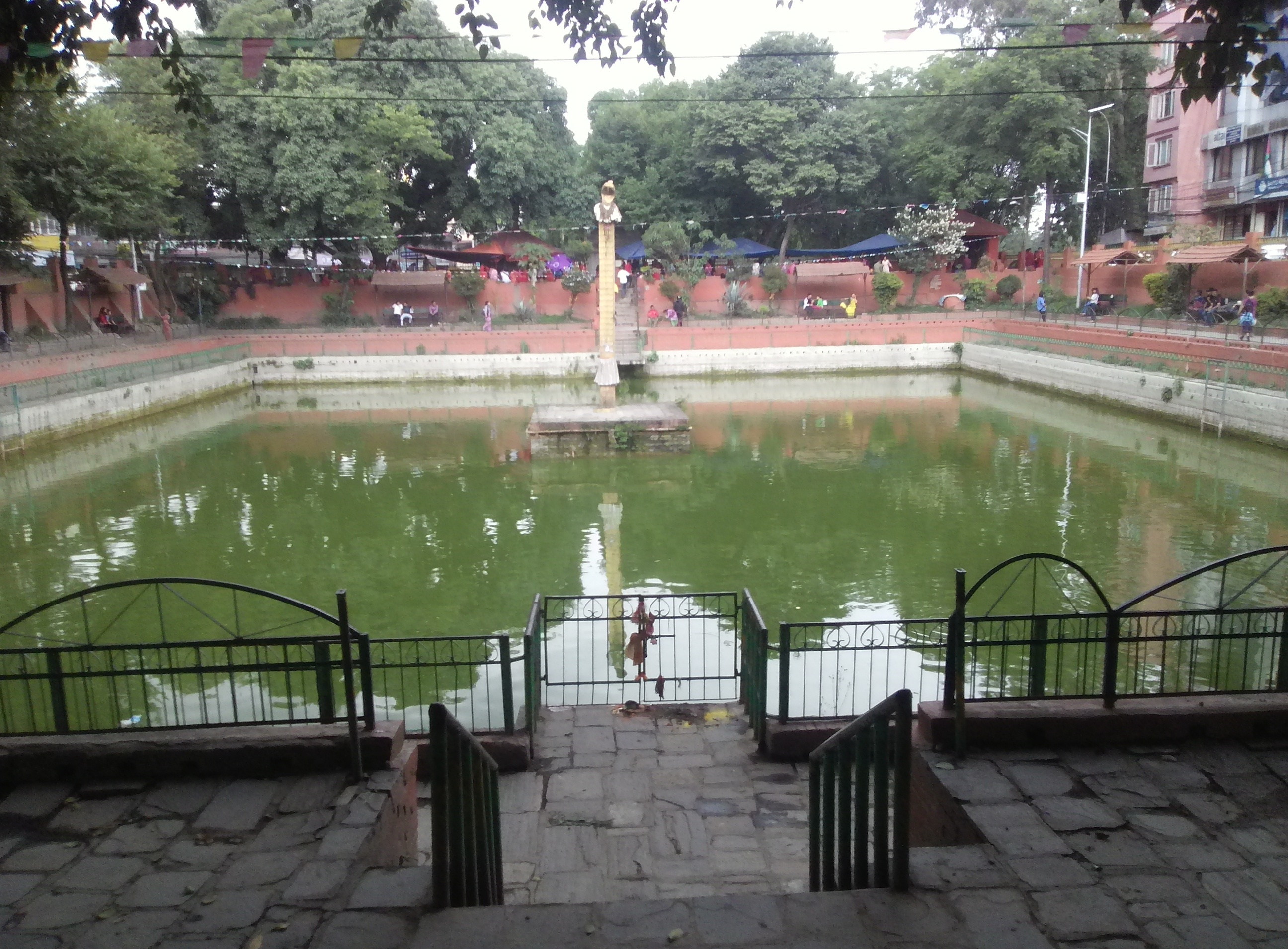
Nag Pokhari, Kathmandu

=== The Royal Canals ===
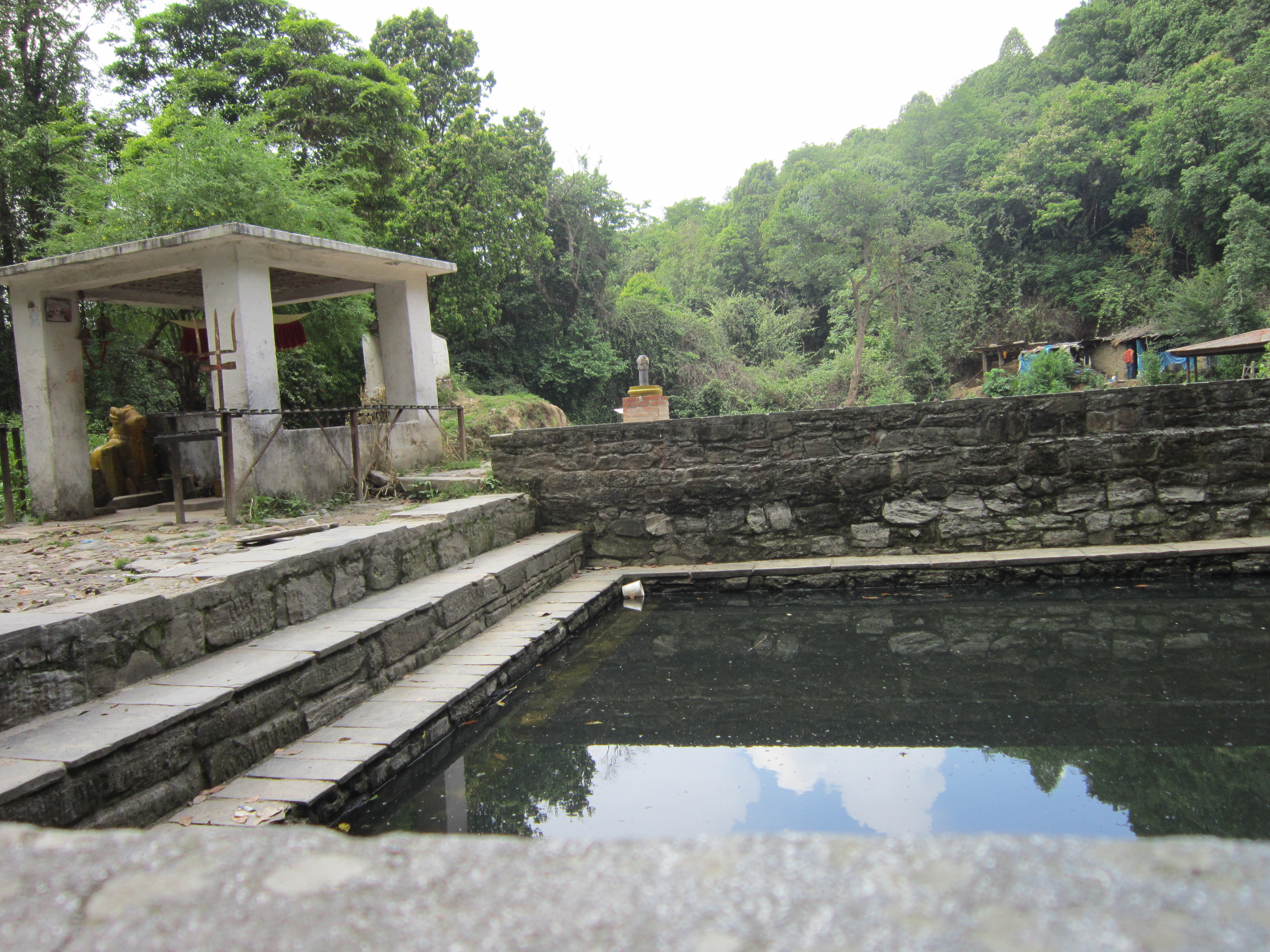
Mahadev Pokhari

The aquifers of the stone spouts are recharged not only by rainfall but also by state canals (also called royal canals or raj kulo). State canals were built to bring water from a stream (like Lele River), spring (like Mahadev Pokhari in Nagarkot) or pond from the foothills to artificial ponds close to stone spouts to augment the aquifers.

King Jitamitra Malla constructed a state canal in 1678 to feed stone spouts located in Bhaktapur and Patan.

Eventually water was brought down into the valley's cities through three canals: Budhikanta Canal for Kathmandu, Bageswori Canal for Bhaktapur and Tikabhairav Canal for Patan. They fed 31 of the ponds in these cities, while also supplying water for irrigation along the way.

Approximately half of the hitis of Bhaktapur and 51 hitis of Patan received their water from the royal canals.

=== Tantric power ===
Many spouts in the Bhaktapur municipality, like Bhimsen Hiti, Indrayani Hiti and Golmadhi Hiti, are believed to receive water through tantric power.

According to the report "A Comparative Evaluation of Stone Spout Management Systems in Heritage and non-Heritage Areas of Kathmandu Valley, Nepal" by Mira Tripathi (2016), some of the people interviewed told her that:

When they dug out the water network they found flaming small earthen pots covered by another earthen pot as a lid... with nuts and coins above the spout. When the lid of the pot was removed the flames subsided and the water flow in the spout also stopped. ... when the lid was put back the water started to flow again. Because there were no other apparent sources for the water to enter the spouts, the Tantric or divine theories took root.

In the same report an expert from Bhaktapur is quoted as saying: "Personally, I believe tantric practice because I have seen many evidence of it..."

== Water usage ==
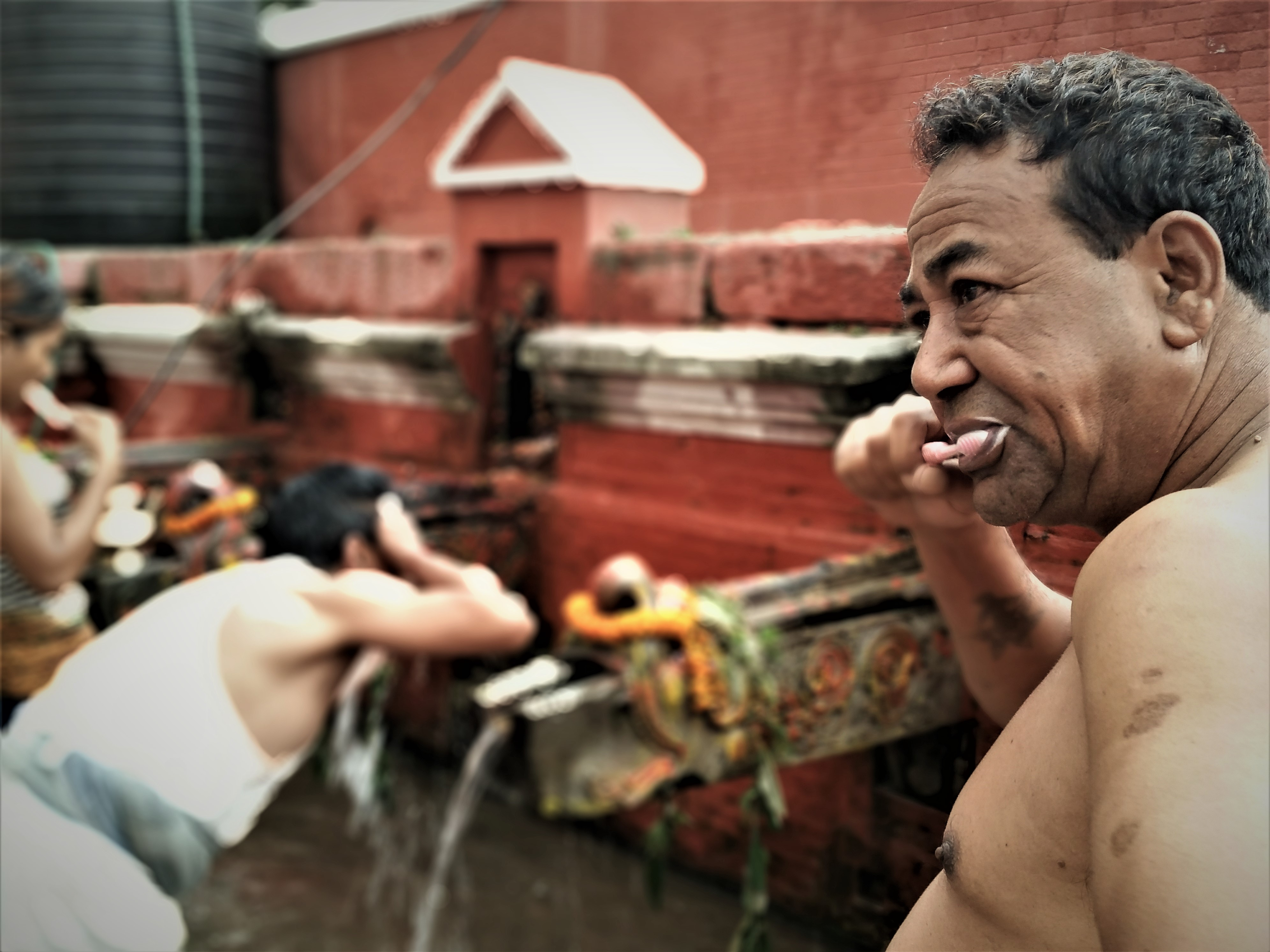
Man brushing his teeth at Kontihiti Kumbheswar, Patan

The water from the hitis is used for ordinary household purposes, for work as well as for religious and cultural activities.

People of Nepal can be seen drinking and washing themselves or their laundry in a hiti, or taking the water home for washing, drinking and cooking.

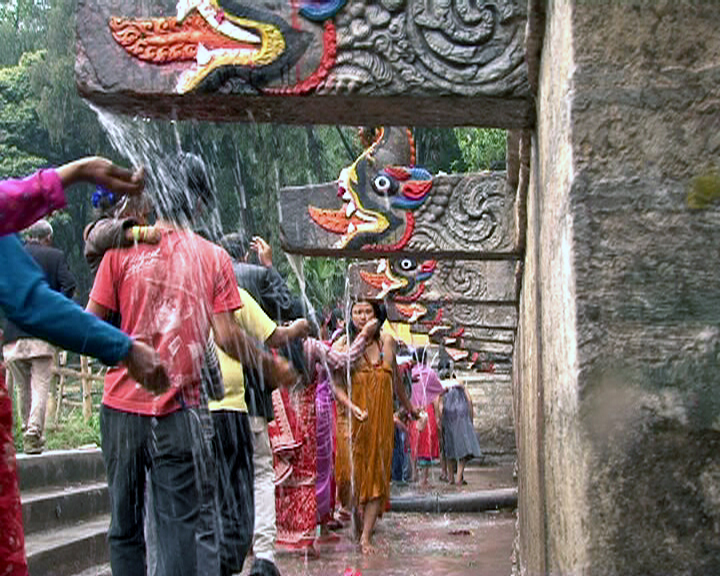
Baisdhara Festival

Special wooden hitis belonging to the Dhobi caste are used for the professional washing of laundry (or at least they were in 1996).

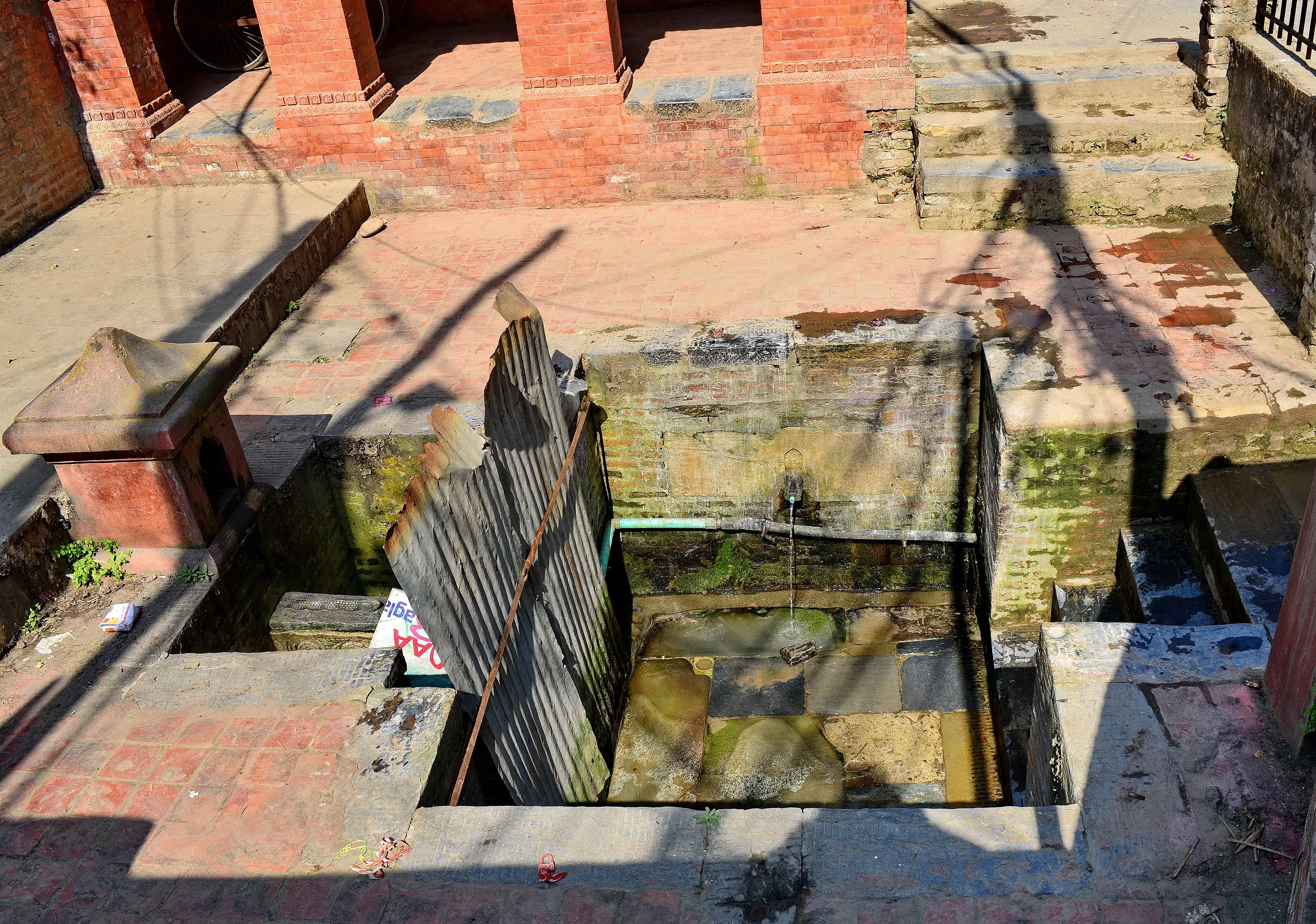
Washa Hiti

=== Medicine ===
A number of hitis are believed to possess healing qualities. Water from Sundhara in Kathmandu, for example, is believed to be good against arthritis and water from Golmadhi Hiti in Bhaktapur against goitre. The water from Washa Hiti in Patan is famous for its medicinal properties; the Nepal Bhasa word washa means 'medicine'.

=== Religious and cultural uses ===
The water is also used for the purification of images of deities.

Some hitis have a role in festivals, like Bhimdhyo Hiti in Bhaktapur, Manga Hiti in Patan and Sundhara in Kathmandu.

Every twelve years the Godawari Mela is celebrated for one month at the sacred pond of Godawari Kunda in Lalitpur District. The 22 stone spouts in Balaju Water Garden in Kathmandu are the focal point during the yearly Balaju Baise Dhara festival. Hundreds of visitors take a ritual shower on this day to enjoy the purifying and healing effects of the water. The twelve stone spouts at Matatirtha are witness to the yearly mother's day celebration.

Water from Bhimdhyo Hiti is being used for religious worship in the Bhimsen temple and the nearby Dattatreya temple in Bhaktapur. Devotees take a bath or make ablutions before entering the temples. Water of Nag Pokhari (also known as Thanthu Darbar Hiti) in Bhaktapur is used to worship the Goddess Taleju. Water from Manga Hiti in Patan is used daily as holy water for Krishna Mandir and it is used to perform puja in Kartik month. Other hitis are also used for worship at nearby temples.

=== Substitute for far away waterbodies ===
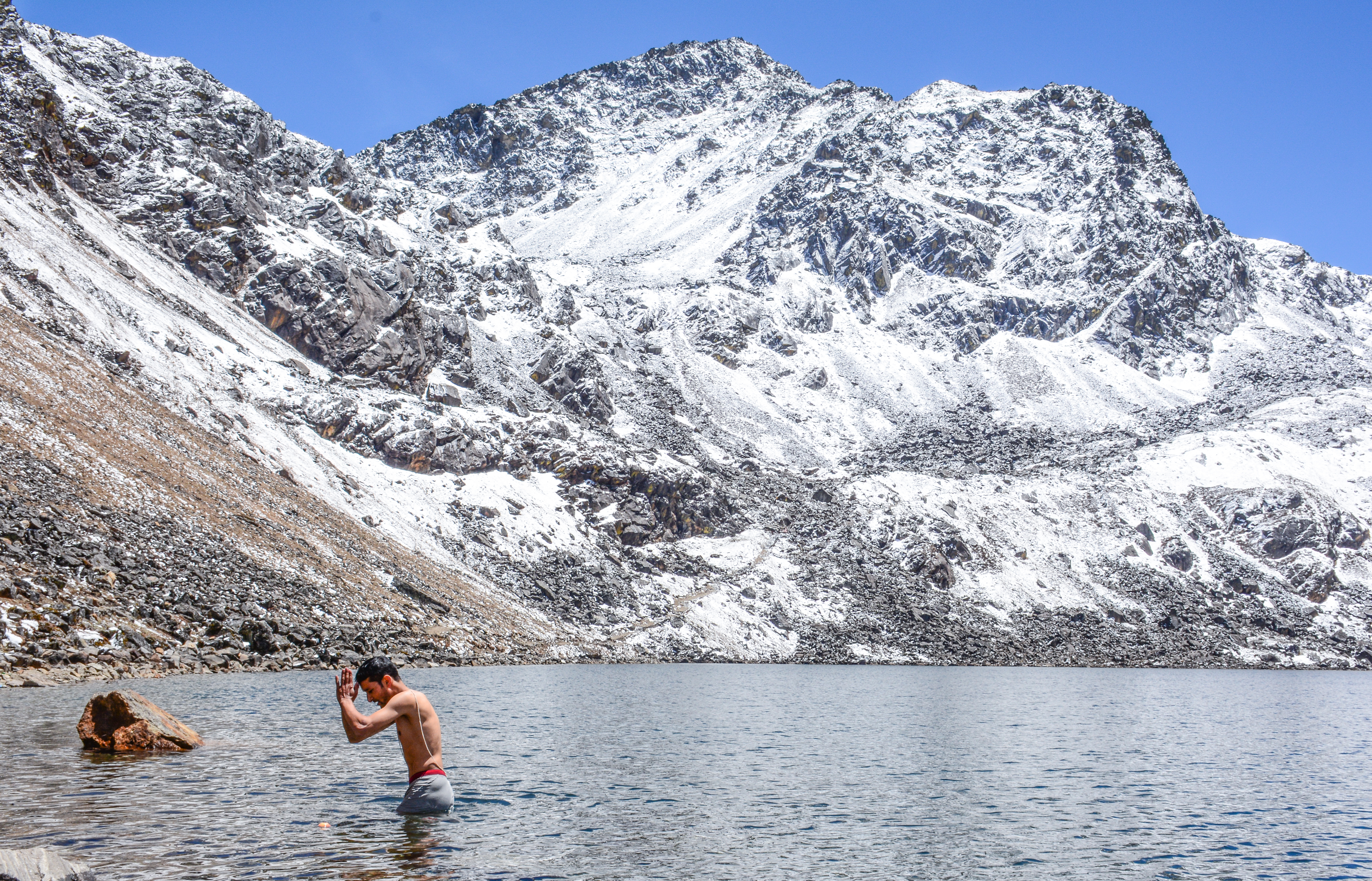
Pilgrim bathing in Gosainkunda

Gosaikunda is a sacred lake for both Hindus and Buddhists. Taking a bath in this lake in Langtang National Park is something to be done at least once in a lifetime. According to legend the spring that feeds the pond in the Kumbheshwar temple complex in Patan is connected to Gosaikunda. Therefore, those who cannot make the long journey to the lake, as thousands of pilgrims do during Janai Purnima or Gangadasahara, can visit Kumbeshwar Pokhari instead.

In a similar way there is believed to be a connection between Godawari Kunda and Kva Hiti in Kathmandu and between Kathmandu's Maru Hiti and Yankidaha near Thankot village in Chandragiri.

=== Disaster response ===
Hitis with a large enough flow (litres per minute) can be vital in case of a fire, especially in densely built parts of the city where a firetruck would not be able to go. Kontihiti in Patan qualified for this in 2012.

After the 2015 earthquake, dhunge dharas were the only source of water for many people of Kathmandu, due to the disruption of the regular drinking water services.

=== Hospitality ===
Along important routes for traders or pilgrims, sometimes a succession of hitis (with dharmasala) was built to alleviate the thirst of the travelers. The road from Sankhu up to the Bajrayogini Temple, for example, is such a route. Art historian Percy Brown describes a series of drinking fountains, built "every few miles" on the road from the Terai to Kathmandu, in his book Picturesque Nepal (1912).

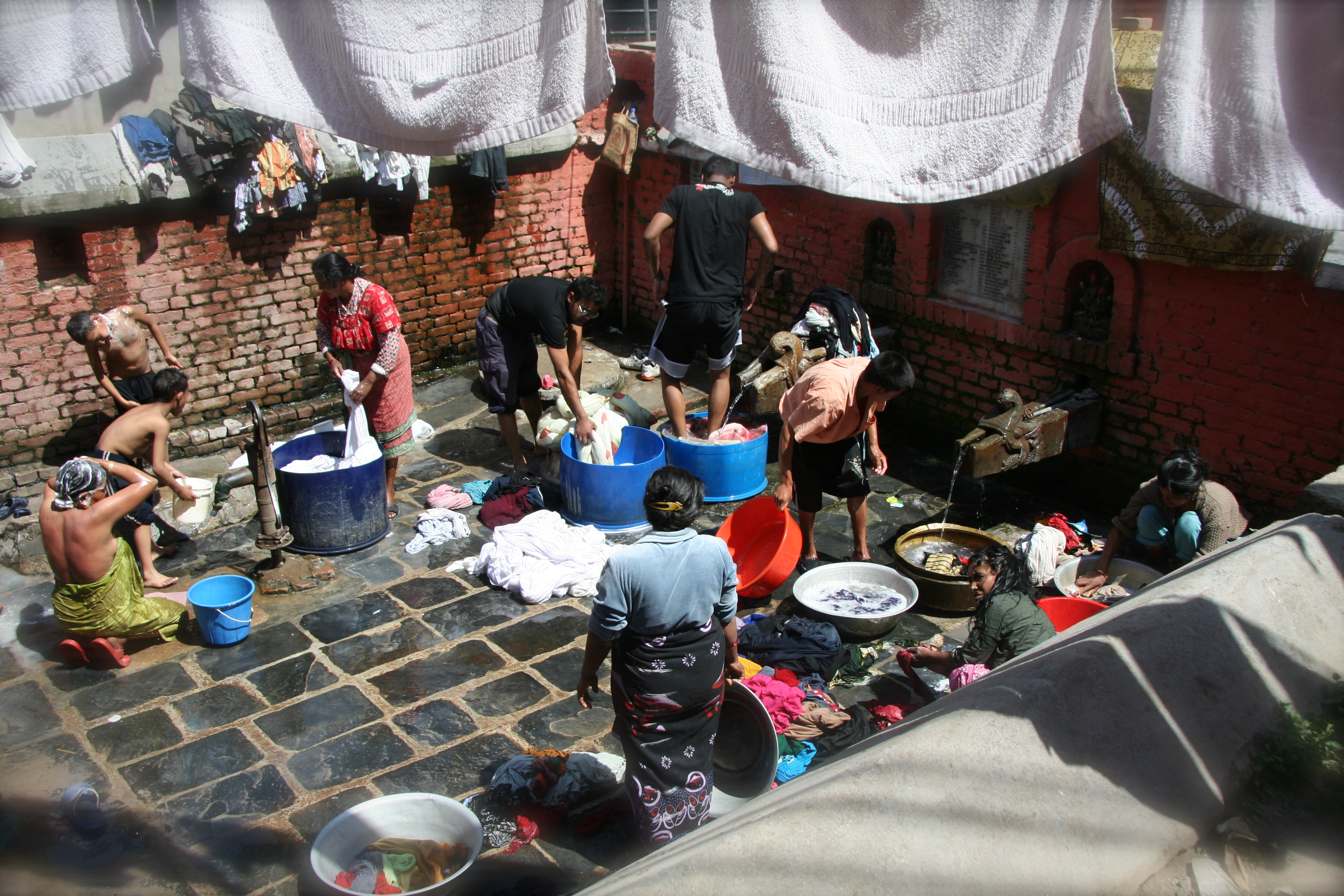
Washing laundry, as seen here in a Kathamandu hiti, was not allowed everywhere

=== Restrictions ===
Not all dhunge dharas were open to be used by everyone in every way possible.

In the past some people were banned from some of the hitis, like people from lower castes, menstruating women and people wearing shoes. In Saraswati Hiti in Patan, for example, people from lower castes were not allowed entry, while everyone was welcome in nearby Narayan Hiti. There were also restrictions for the behaviour inside some of the hitis. For instance washing laundry or utensils, washing your legs and shoes or using soap was forbidden. Texts describing these restrictions can sometimes be found in old inscriptions on the premises. Some of them are still being observed.

Observing restrictions regarding the behaviour inside a dhunge dhara may very well contribute to maintaining their water quality. If one hiti receives water drained from another (see above), for example, one can imagine wanting to make sure its filter will be able to effectively deal with the water it receives from the source.

== Management ==
Traditionally the daily maintenance of the hitis was in the hands of guthis (local community groups dedicated to certain tasks). Living near the hiti and maybe paying regular visits to it as users, they were best placed to discover problems, like damage to the masonry, pollution with debris or clogging of the drain, and perform repairs. The guthis were receiving payment for their work. On a different level procedures were in place to maintain the royal canals.

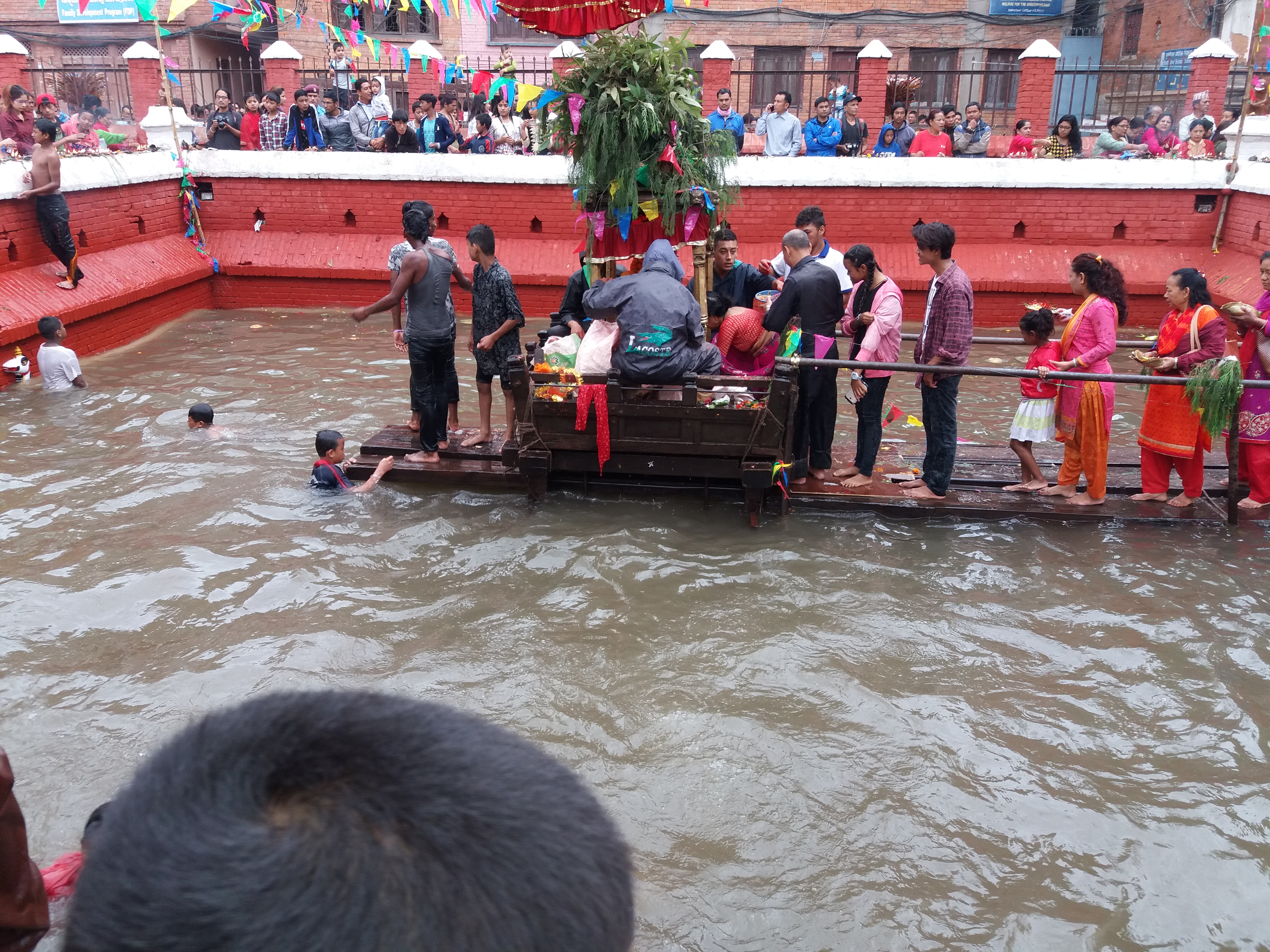
Kumbeshwar Mela in Patan

Even in the past the maintenance of the entire water system has been problematic. King Jitamitra Malla (1663-1696) of Bhaktapur had to issue a law to ensure the maintenance would be done.

Each year Sithi Nakha, a day dedicated to Kumar Kartikeya, one of the two sons of Hindu deity Shiva, is used to clean water sources like wells, ponds and hitis. People all over Kathmandu Valley converge to perform their cleaning activities before the beginning of the monsoon rains.

Other festivals contribute to the upkeep of hitis and ponds as well, because they require them to be in good working order before the festival can take place. The Bunga Dyah Jatra in Patan is one example; all the ponds that are involved in the festival need to be filled with water, before the construction of the chariot at Pulchok can begin. And all the stops of the procession are next to one of the water bodies of Patan. During the festival Janai Purnima the otherwise dry Kumbeshwar Pokhari in Patan must be filled for the Kumbeshwar Mela. Similarly Kathmandu's Gahana Pokhari is vital in the Gahana Khojne festival, just as the city's Nag Pokhari is for Naga Panchami. Siddha Pokhari in Bhaktapur is central in the Dashain festival.

Sometimes the reverse happens: the decline of the water bodies causes a tradition to be discontinued. This is what happened with the yearly "Nine conduit procession" (gupu hiti sikegu) in Bhaktapur.

== Decline ==
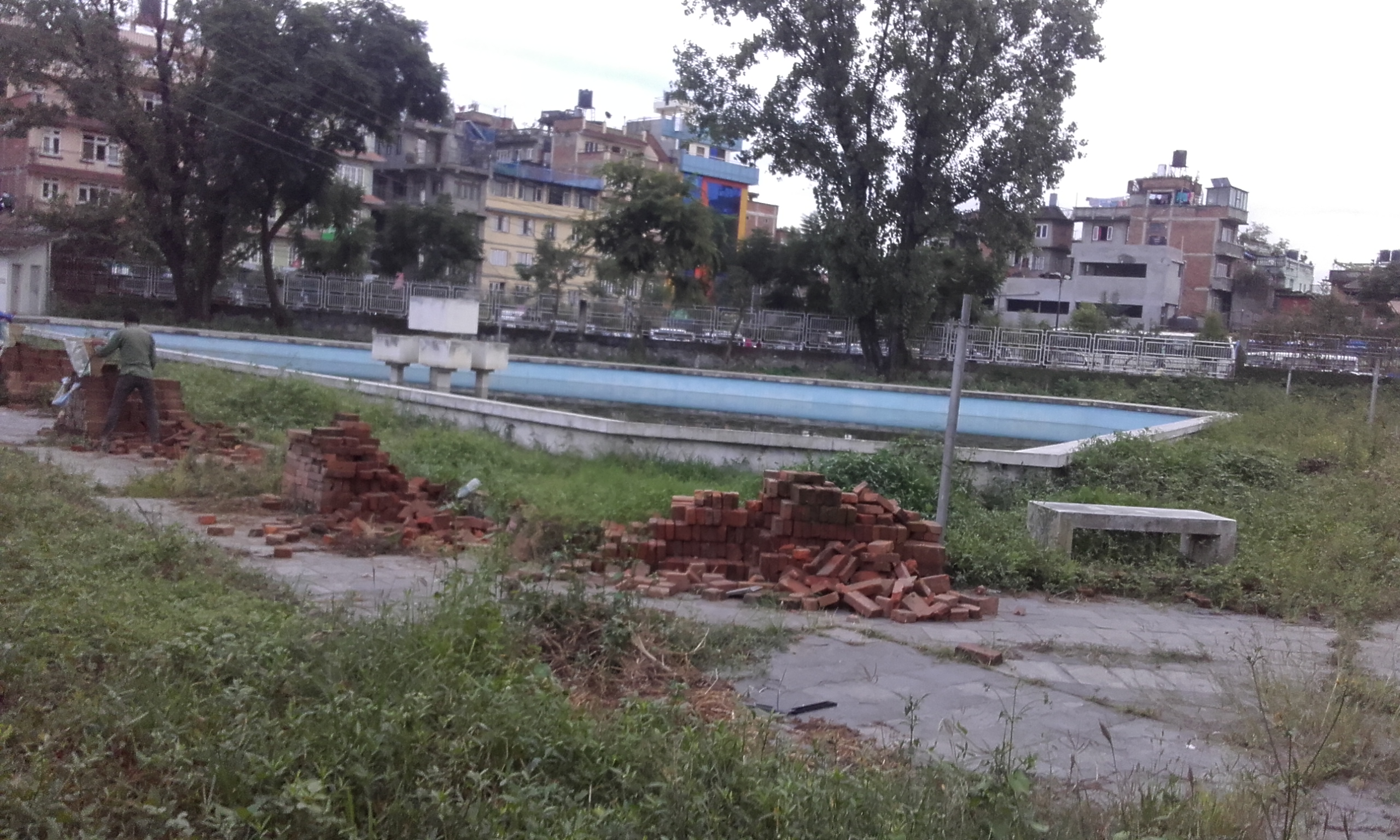
The reduced Paleswan Pukhu in Patan

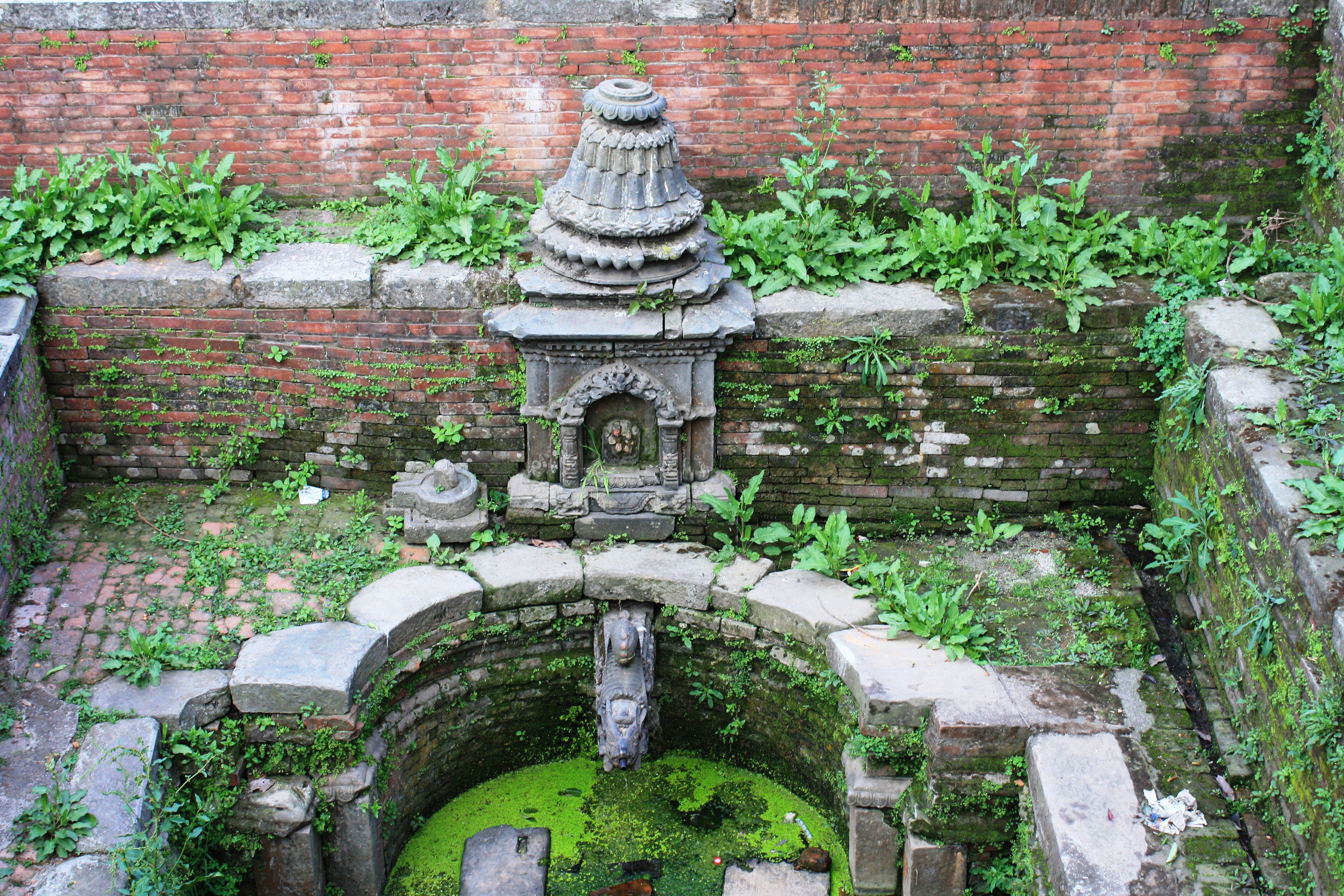
Neglected hiti in Bhaktapur

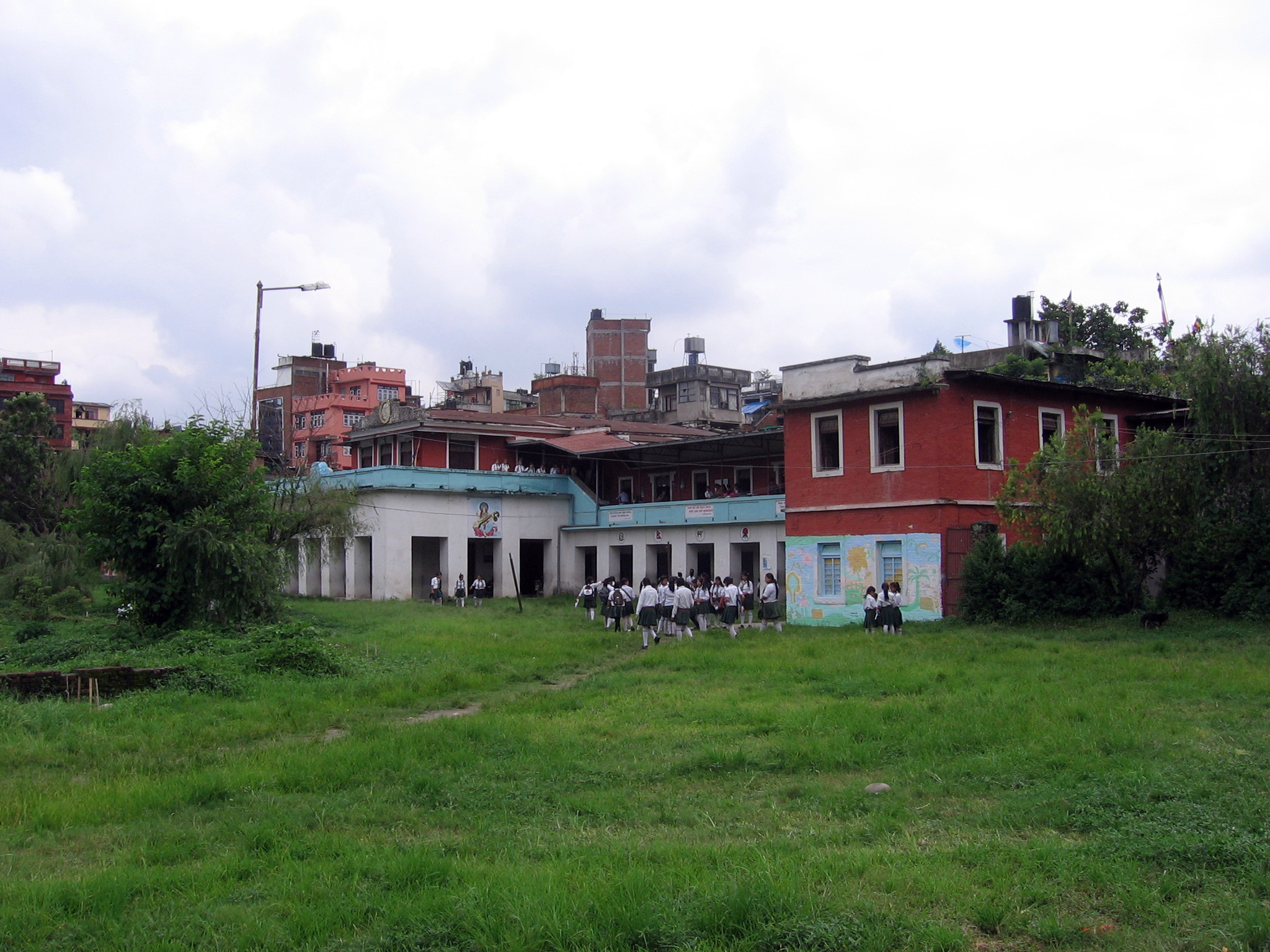
A dried Ekha Pukhu in Kathmandu next to Kanya Mandir School

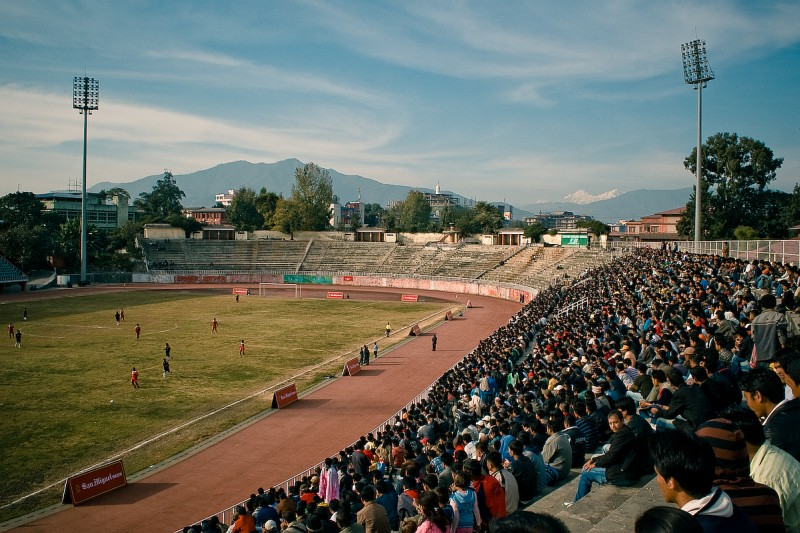
The Dasharath Rangasala in Kathmandu was built over a large lotus pond.

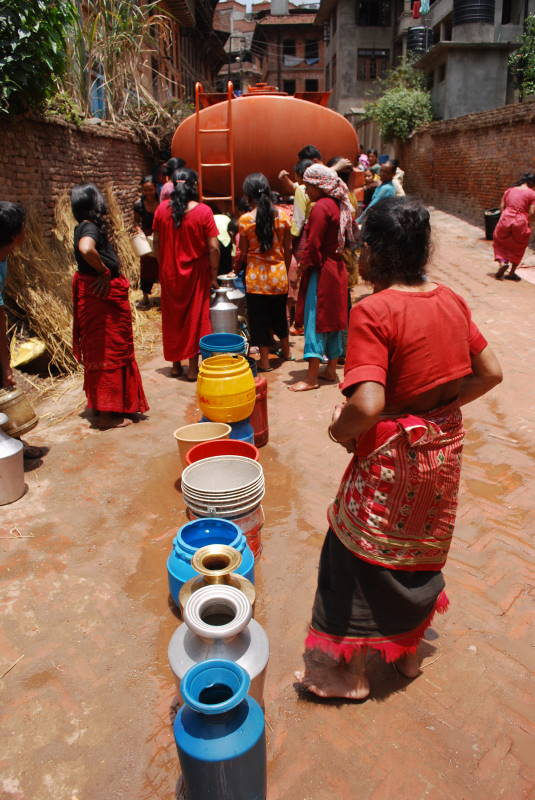
Water tank truck in Bhaktapur

In late 1891, under Rana rule (1846-1951 AD), a piped water system (Bir Dhara) was introduced in Kathmandu Valley. At that time it was only available to the elite. After the country had opened itself up to the world in 1951, the western water management system was expanded to Kathmandu, Patan and Bhaktapur and the rest of the country. Unfortunately, this led to the neglect of the hiti infrastructure.

The earthquake of 1934 damaged part of the royal canals, causing many hitis to dry up.

With the absence of any regulation, hitis and ponds were encroached upon.

A municipal building was built on the site of Paleswan Pukhu in Patan, greatly reducing its size, and one pond became a bus station. Schools were built in ponds in Patan and Kathmandu. Kathmandu's large Lainchaur Pokhari had to make room for the Nepal Scouts building. Bhaktapur also saw ponds turned into a school and a bus station. The pond areas have become prime real estate in Katmandu Valley.

Of the 39 ponds counted in Patan in 1993, 9 were reduced in size and 14 were completely gone in 2007. Of the 233 ponds found in the 2019 survey by the KVWSMB 40 were destroyed completely.

Hitis underwent a similar fate. Either their source was damaged or their connection to it was interrupted by the construction of houses or underground pipes. There are three documented cases in Bhaktapur, for example, were the construction of a building interrupted the water flow of a dhunge dhara from its source: Wochu Hiti, Dekwocha Hiti and Hakufo Hiti. Some hiti's were built over entirely with offices or roads. Jhanga Hiti in Kathmandu, for example, a dhungedhara just north west of Rani Pokhari, was built over with a clubhouse for a local football club. In other cases the water level in the aquifer has dropped due to the digging of private wells by individual houseowners or industries.

The government policy to centralise management of the guthi system under Nepal Guthi Corporation had a detrimental effect. Hitis were not looked after properly any more and were allowed to be polluted. Necessary repairs were not forthcoming. In one case the roots of a peepal tree, that had been kept in check by the hiti users, were allowed to grow unchecked, causing leakage of the pipes, which in turn caused the hiti to dry up.

The water is also increasingly contaminated with chemicals and bacteria. This affects other sources of water as well, like the dug wells, water tank trucks, tap water and bottled water. Part of the contamination is caused by the leakage of septic tanks.

The water shortage is further compounded by an industry that has developed to alleviate it. Deep wells are dug outside the municipal areas by private enterprises. In 2019 about 150 private water companies were active in Kathmandu Valley. This has further lowered the groundwater level, affecting the flow of the hitis. It has also affected farmers in the area who now have to compete for water that has traditionally always been theirs. Water tank trucks from government organisations and commercial water enterprises are a familiar sight in the cities these days.

== Revival ==
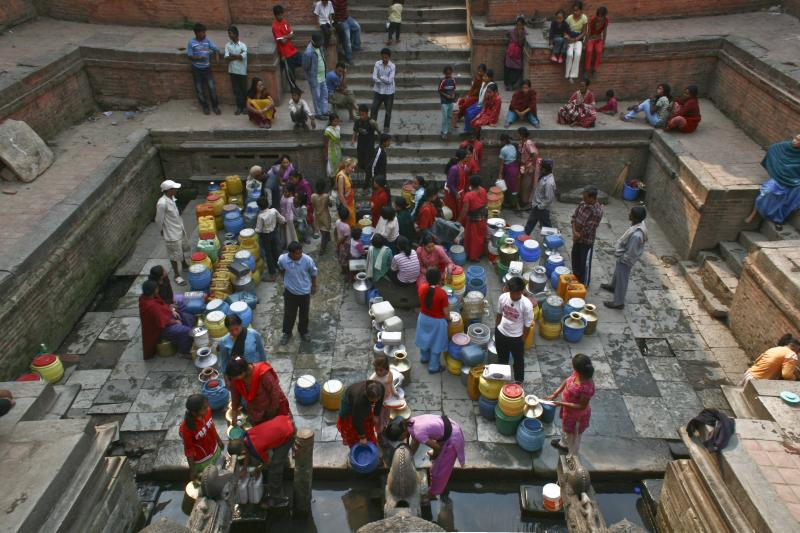
Waiting in line at Manga Hiti, Patan

Over the past decades there is an increasing interest in reviving the dhunge dharas of the country, not merely because they belong to the cultural heritage of Nepal.

=== Growing water shortage ===
Despite efforts of the Nepalese government to supply safe drinking water to all citizens of Nepal, most recently through the much-plagued Melamchi Water Supply Project, started in 1988, many people still have to turn to hitis for their daily water needs. Kathmandu Upatyaka Khanepani Limited (KUKL) managed to supply 110 million litres of water per day in 2016 (about 144 mld in the wet season and 86 mld in the dry season), while the daily demand for water in the valley was around 370 million liters. According to Sanjeev Bickram Rana, executive director of the KVWSMB, the discrepancy between supply and demand has risen since then: at the beginning of the year 2020 he reported a demand of 400 mld, while the supply varied from 150 to 90 mld.

This continued water shortage has led to several initiatives to investigate the possibilities of reviving the old systems in the Kathmandu Valley, some of them recommending that the Declaration of the National Convention on Stone Spouts of 2007 (DNCSS 2007) be implemented. The reports all stress the necessity of working hitis to supplement the drinking water supply, although they differ in their assessment of how difficult achieving this would be.

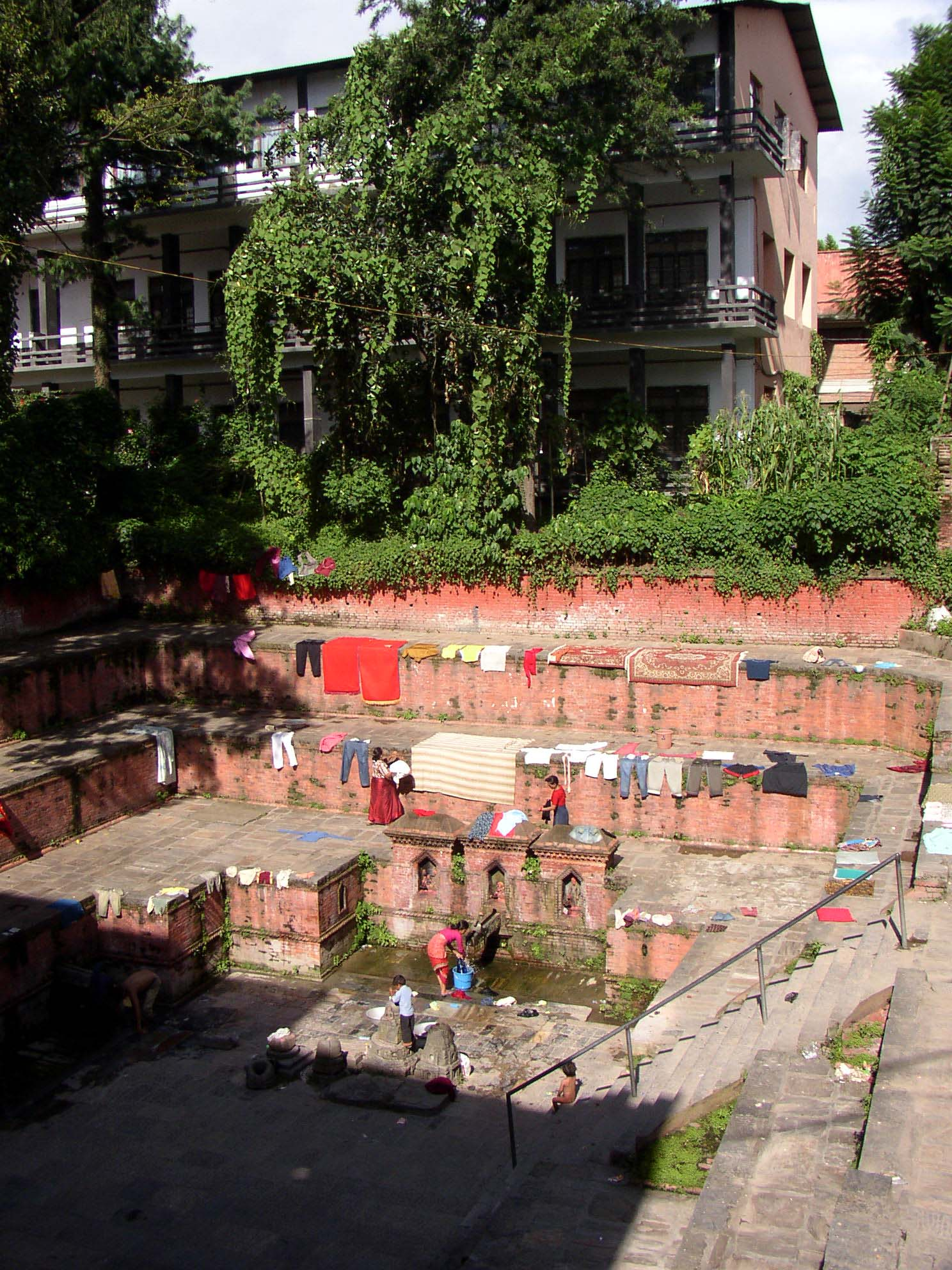
Ga Hiti in Thamel

It isn't the first time a severe water shortage has reminded people of the existence of a neglected dhunge dhara. In 1971 the people of Patan excavated one for this reason near Uku Bahal. The dhunge dhara was still working. In 1984 another working dhunge dhara was uncovered in Bhota Hiti in Kathmandu during the excavation work for an underground passage.

=== Work on dhunge dharas ===
In the meantime, a number of individual hitis has been renovated. In Patan, for example, local citizens have revived Alko Hiti, Iku Hiti and Hiku Hiti. In some cases, like with Nagbahal Hiti, the revival has been short-lived.

In 2020 the Lalitpur Metropolitan City started a campaign to revive several hiti's, beginning with Sundhara and two other spouts. Eight other hiti's are to follow. The water is to come from a new rainwater harvesting site in Sinchahiti.

Until April 2015 Ga Hiti in Thamel (Kathmandu) provided about 12,000 households with access to water. During the earthquake part of the neighboring hotel collapsed into the hiti, killing several people in the hotel as well as in the hiti basin. Ga Hiti was further damaged by the search and rescue operation that ensued. Thanks to the efforts of the local community, members of the Ga Hiti Youth Club and many volunteers, and with the help of the Kathmandu Metropolitan Office, Ga Hiti was restored by the beginning of 2017.

In Madhyapur Thimi 25 dhunge dharas and 11 traditional ponds have been restored in 2021.

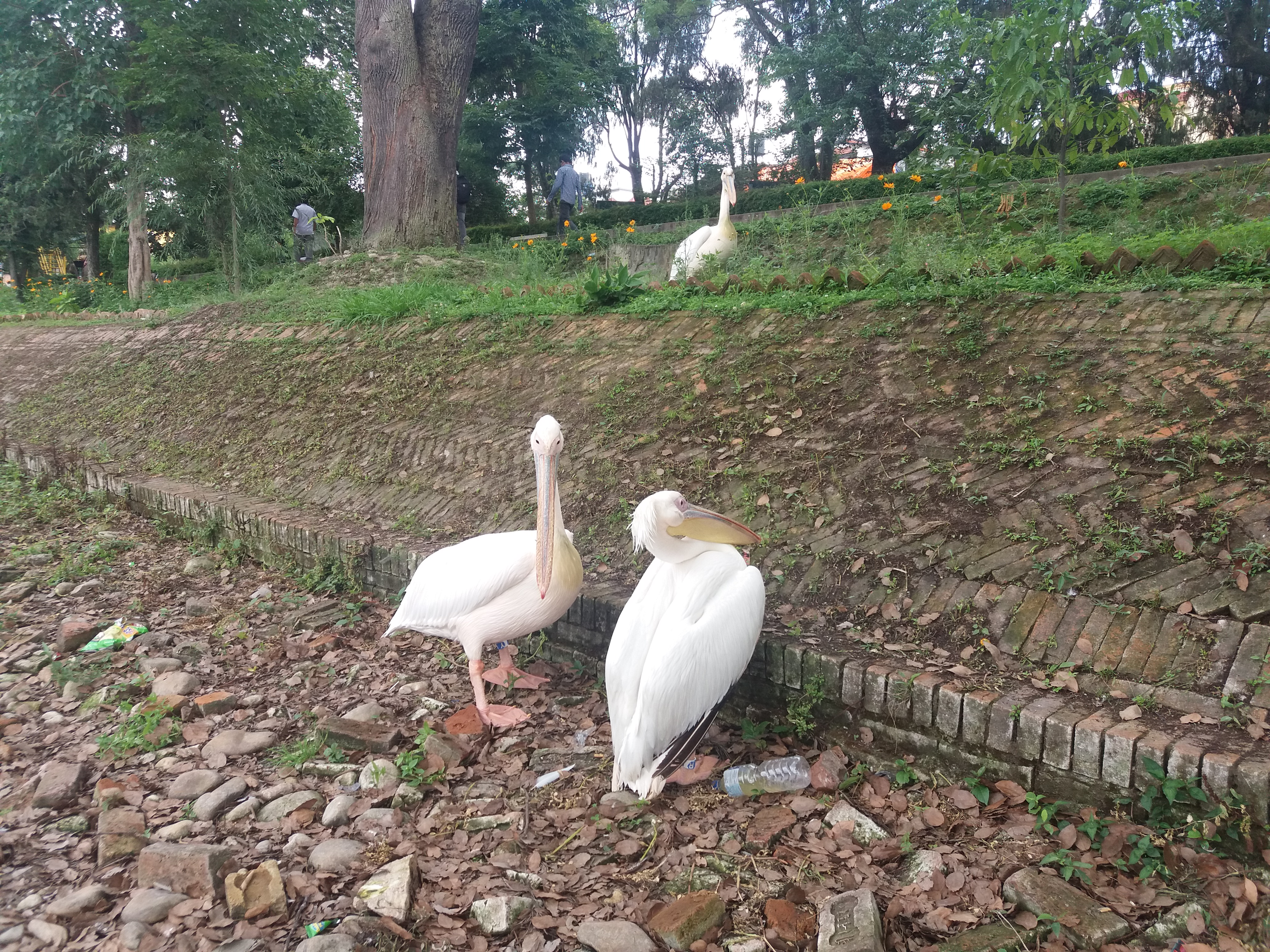
Jyawalakhyo Pukhu in Patan still has the traditional brickwork. This pond is the source of Iku Hiti and Hiku Hiti

=== New life for ponds ===
In the large cities of Kathmandu Valley several ponds are in the process of being restored, like Rani Pokhari in Kathmandu, Bhajya Pukhu in Bhaktapur and Nhu Pokhari in Patan. In other areas of the country ponds are being restored or even created as well.

Some ponds have been restored using concrete for the walls and the bed instead of the traditional brick and kalo mato (black mud). This has turned them into impenetrable tanks and so deprives them of their original role in the water management of their city. Examples of ponds changed in this way are Khapinchhen Pukhu, Kuti Sauga Pukhu and Kanibahal Pukhu (Bhailagaa Pukhu).

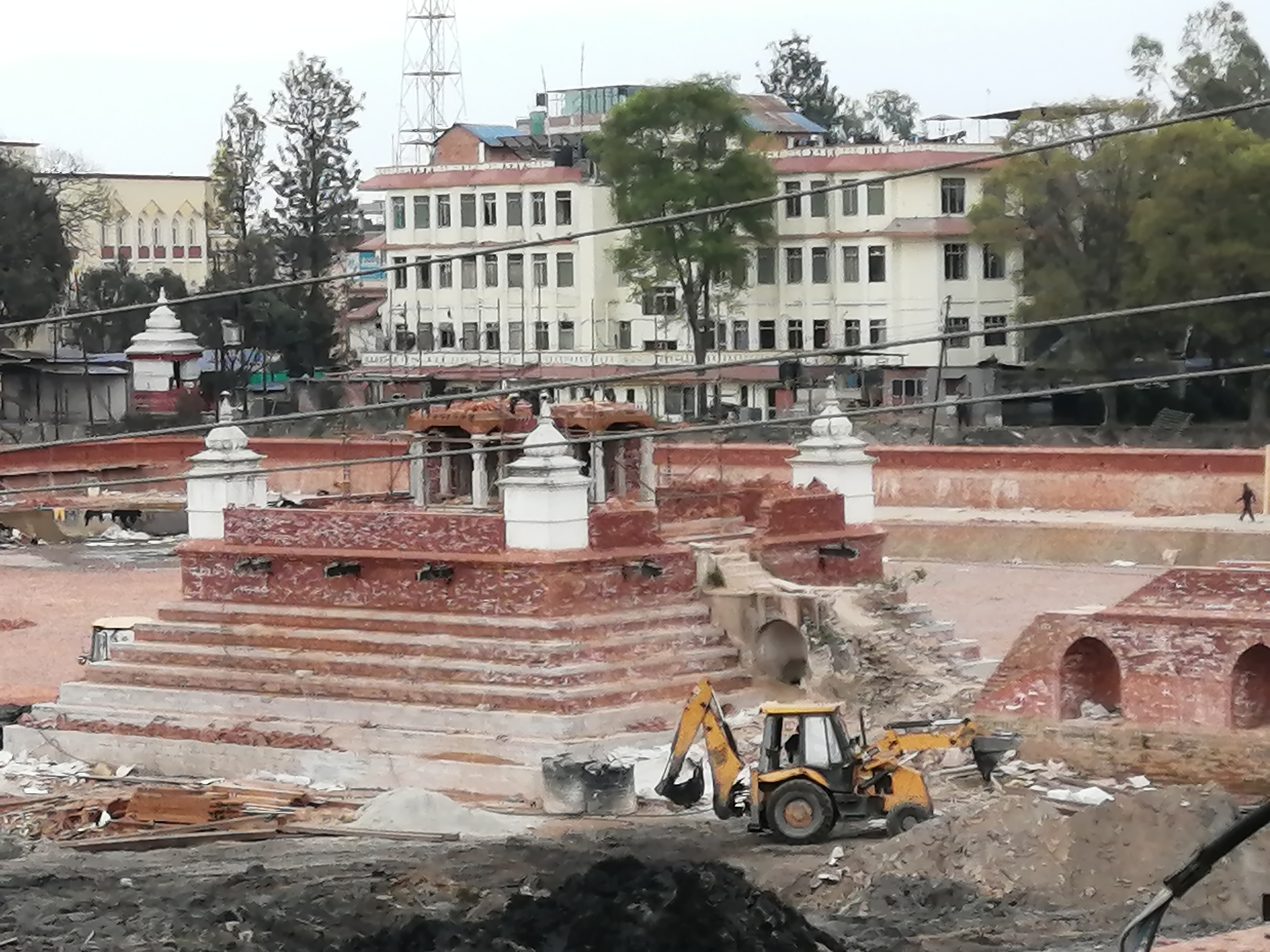
Rani Pokhari in March 2020. The concrete is being replaced by bricks

==== Kathmandu ====
The work on Rani Pokhari, which was damaged in the 2015 earthquake, began in January 2016 and has been fraught with controversy. The original plans used concrete for the restoration and included fountains and a new lakeside café. After a series of local protests the city of Katmandu was ordered in January 2018 to restore the pond to the way it was in 1670. Sixty traditional builders, more than 40 of them women, were brought in from Bhaktapur to take up the task. The reconstruction was completed in October 2020. The crew that reconstructed Rani Pokhari has now been hired to work on Sundhara in Kathmandu. In July 2019 a start was made with the reconstruction of Kamal Pokhari. The design choices for this pond have led to protests as well. There is also a proposal for the restoration of what is left of Ekha Pukhu.

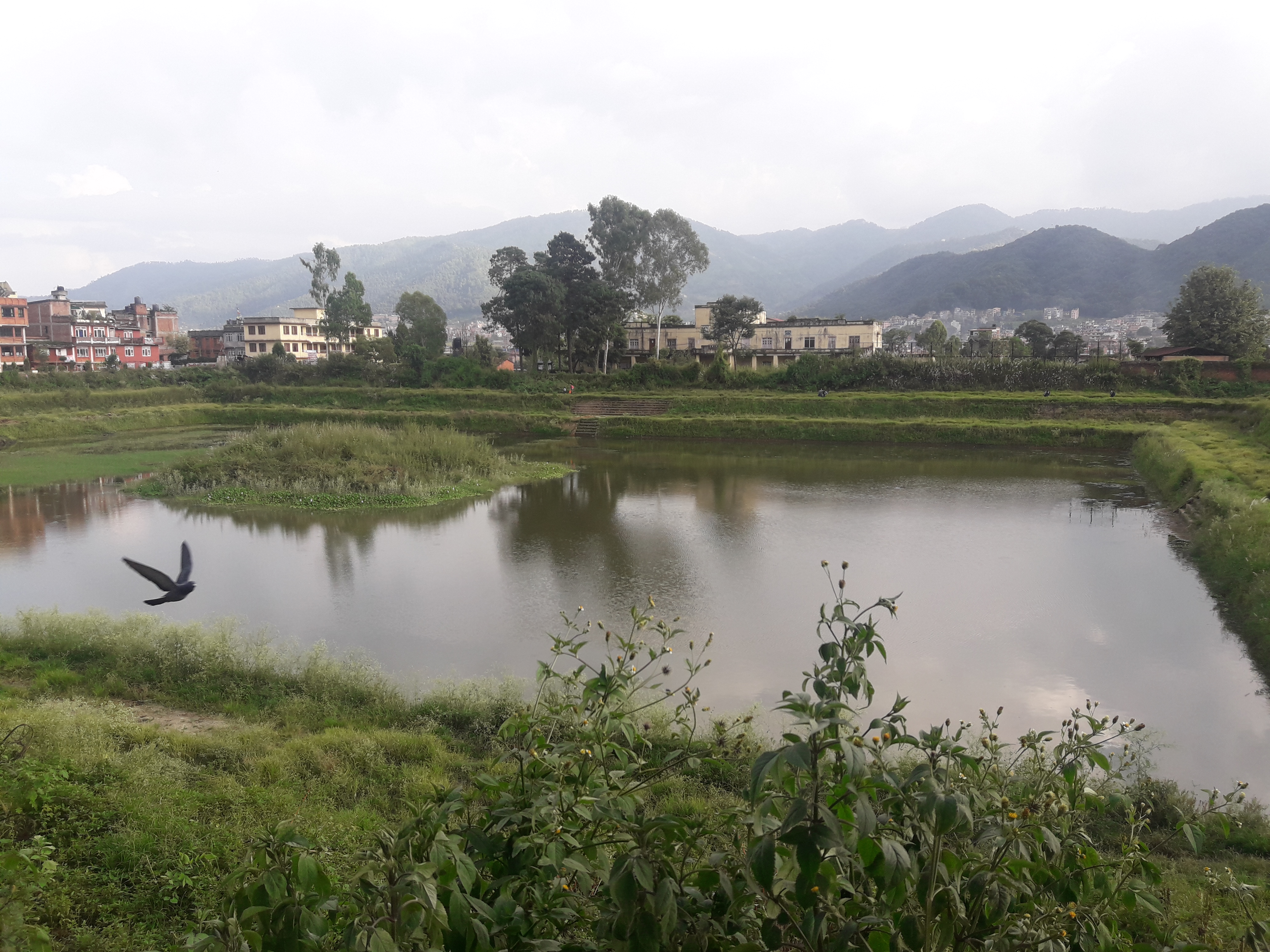
Bhajya Pukhu before restoration

==== Bhaktapur ====
Bhaju Pukhu, a pond that has recently been established as being much older than Rani Pokhari but is in many ways very similar, incurred serious damage in a 1681 earthquake and had since never been restored. In October 2017 a project was started that included restoration of Bhaju Pukhu, using the traditional methods and materials. The work is expected to be completed in 2019. The city of Bhaktapur is currently working on the restoration of six ponds, five wells, and five hitis.

==== Patan ====
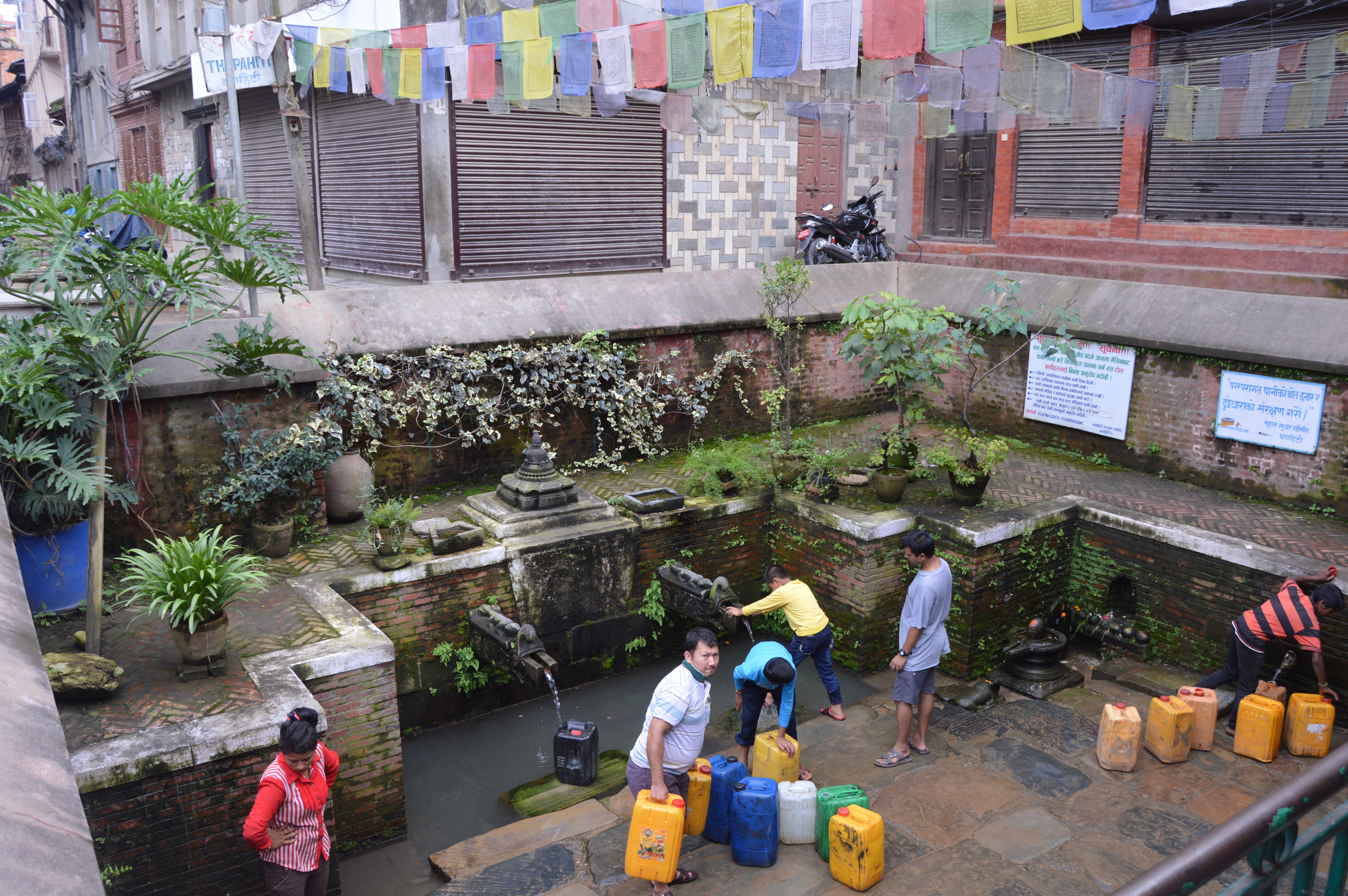
Thapa Hiti in Patan

The work on Nhu Pokhari has started in 2019. The plan is to use traditional materials here as well. Pimbahal Pokhari in Patan has already been restored and the city of Lalitpur has plans for Purna Chandi and Saptapatal Pokhari. The Supreme Court of Nepal had to intervene on behalf of Saptapatal Pokhari to stop the building that was planned there. Prayag Pokhari in Patan could not be saved. Apart from a small concrete courtyard that was kept for religious purposes, it was all built up. With the help of the government of the Czech Republic and a Czech company a new way was found to harvest the rainwater in the area and provide water for Tagal Hiti and Thapa Hiti.

==== Other locations ====
In Sankhu two ponds: Pala Pukhu and Kalash Pokhari, have been restored and provided with fire hydrants. Kirtipur and Bungamati are also working on their ponds.

Between 2013 and 2016 the villagers of Tinpiple and Dapcha Chhatrebangh, both in Kavre District, with the help of the ICIMOD and the Nepal Water Conservation Foundation (NWCF), dug six ponds in the hillsides of the villages to replenish the groundwater and revive their village springs and spouts.

In the Manthali Municipality and the Ramechhap Municipality a project was started to revive 50 old ponds in two years time, with the help of the German Federal Ministry for Economic Cooperation and Development. So far 21 ponds have been restored, for example Thulo Pokhari in Sunarpani.

The restoration of Dui Pokhari in Madhyapur Thimi is already bearing fruit. Starting in 2018, the pond was restored using two six inch layers of kalo mato, a three-inch layer of pango mato (clay) and four inches of bricks. This would contain the water, while at the same time allowing seepage into the ground. A few months after the work was finished, the water in the surrounding wells began to return.

=== Rajkulo repairs ===
The state canals have received attention as well. Because the canal of Patan was found to be in the best condition, compared to the canals of Bhaktapur and Kathmandu, in 2005 a project was started to bring it back to life. When the canal is completely restored, an estimated 40 hitis will start working again. At this time the canal has reached Thecho, about five kilometers from Patan Durbar Square. The project was halted for some years, due to a lack of funds, but will be resumed in 2020. The water will be directed towards Saptapatal Pokhari.

In 2016 a rajkulo used for irrigation in Bidur Municipality, Nuwakot, that had been damaged in 2015, was repaired and improved by the Community For Business Development and Promotion Society (COBDEPS).

== Unusual dhunge dhara ==
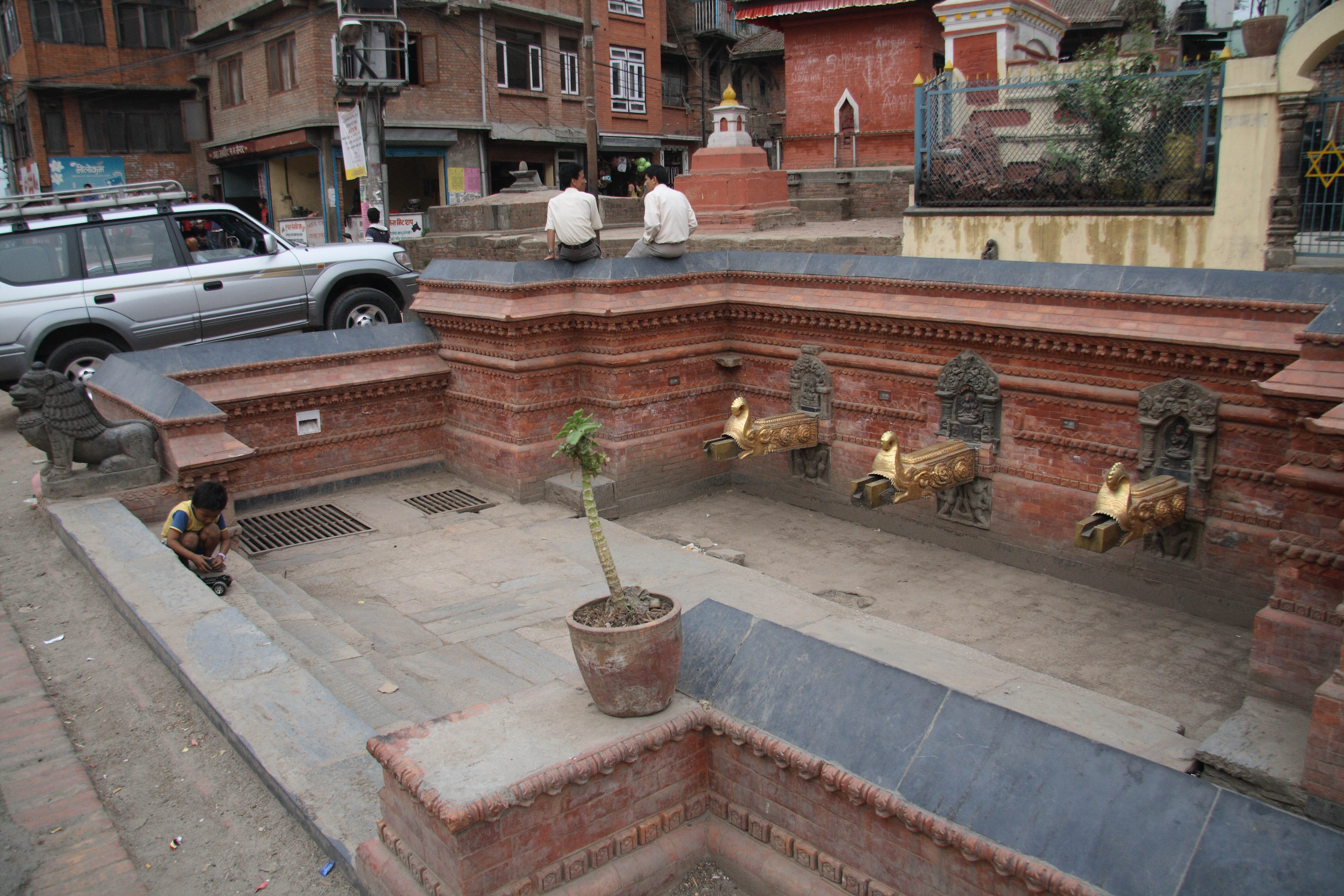
Sundhara in Patan, now slightly below street level

Some hitis stand out because they deviate in a significant way from the expected architecture.

=== Dhunge dhara above street level ===
All dhunge dhara in the Kathmandu Valley are built into a depression of some kind to allow the water to flow naturally. Sundhara (or Nuga Hiti, with gold plated spouts) in Patan is an exception. It was originally built above street level. Due to later development of the surrounding area people now have to walk a few steps down.

According to legend, Sundhara was built by a man who attended the opening of Sauga Hiti in Patan. This man joked about the depth of the hiti, saying that anyone who would descend the steps to drink needed to bring food to help restore them for the climb back up. He vowed to build a hiti on an elevation and so created Sundhara.

Keeping the water flowing in Sundhara is an ongoing struggle, as its water sources are siphoned off by nearby private wells belonging to industries and households. In 2020, a new rainwater harvesting initiative was launched to help strengthen the water flow.

=== Recoiled spouts ===
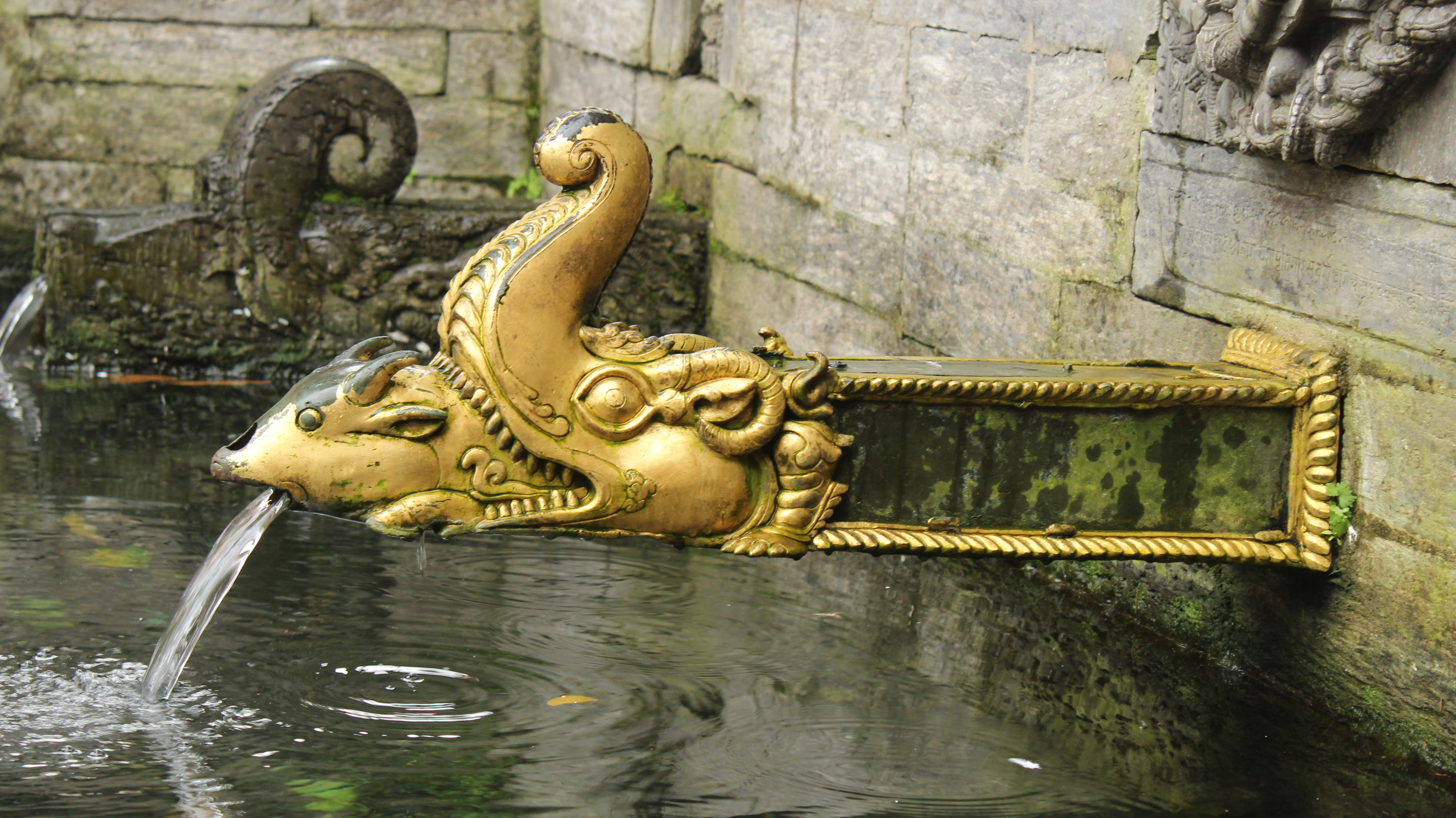
Two spouts of Narayan Hiti in Kathmandu. The left one has a recoiled snout. The right spout is a Malla era replacement of the original.

Narayan Hiti in Kathmandu, a dhunge dhara east of the palace entrance, has three spouts: one is gold plated and two are made of plain stone. The stone spouts are relatively unique as the elephant trunks of the hitimangas are curled backwards instead of forwards.

A legend dates this feature to 464 AD, at the start of the reign of King Mānadeva. Narayan Hiti had run dry, and when King Dharmadeva consulted court astrologers, they replied a human sacrifice would restore the waters. They added that the sacrificial victim must possess 32 virtues. Since only he himself and his son Prince Mānadeva qualified, Dharmadeva decided to trick his son into sacrificing him, saying he should kill the first man he would find sleeping at Narayan Hiti that night. He then went to the dhunge dhara himself, and lay down there with face covered to avoid recognition. Prince Mānadeva slew the man with his sword as told, and only afterwards discovered he had killed his own father. The hiti began working again, but the spouts had recoiled in horror at the royal parricide.

There are other, slightly different, versions of this legend: one names an earlier king and prince, while in another Narayan Hiti is a newly built hiti instead of an already existing one.

Only one other spout with a recoiled trunk has been found, but this spout was not part of a working hiti: it was used as a paving stone in a courtyard in Deopatan (Kathmandu).

== In popular culture ==
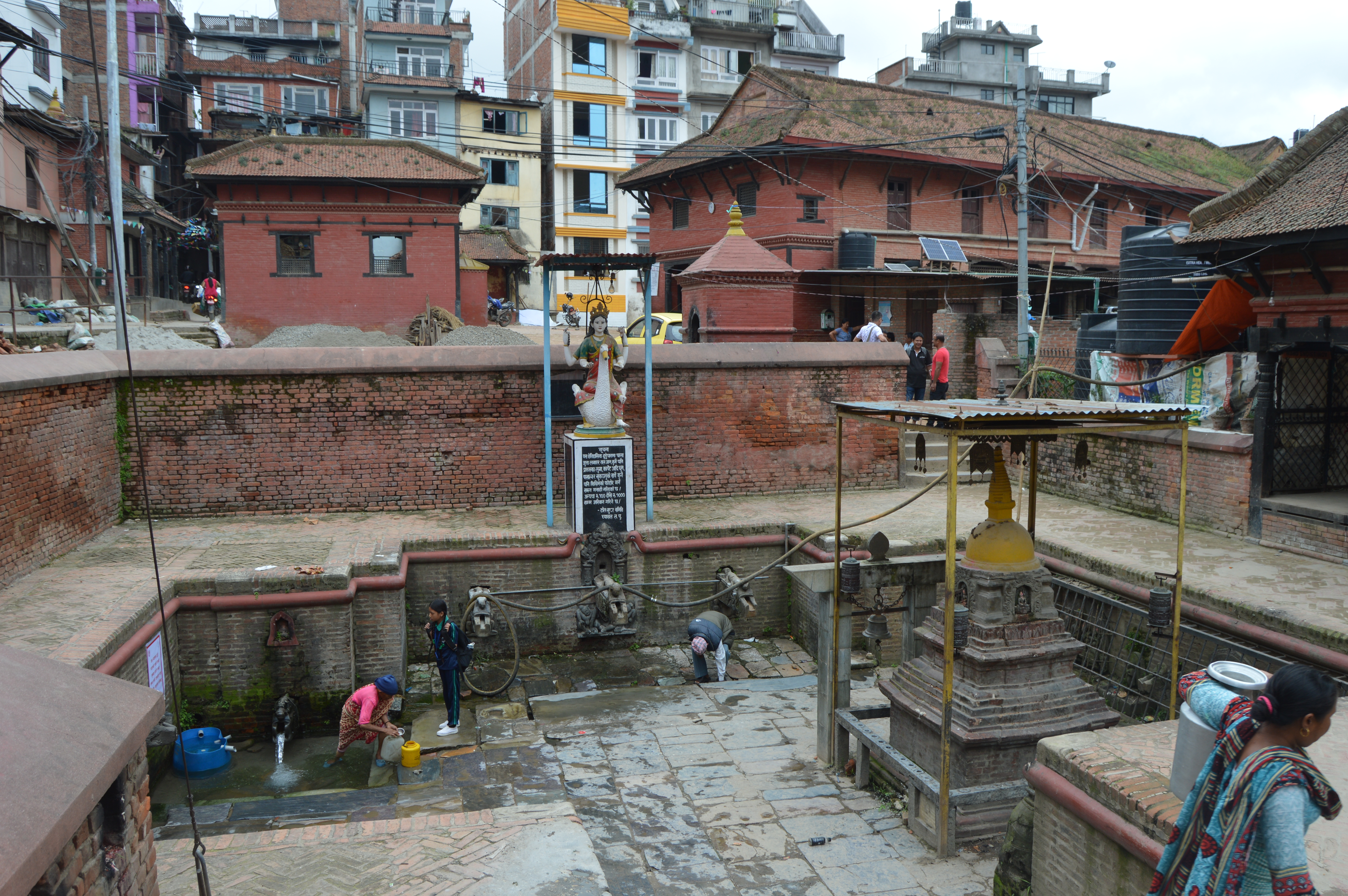
Saraswati Hiti

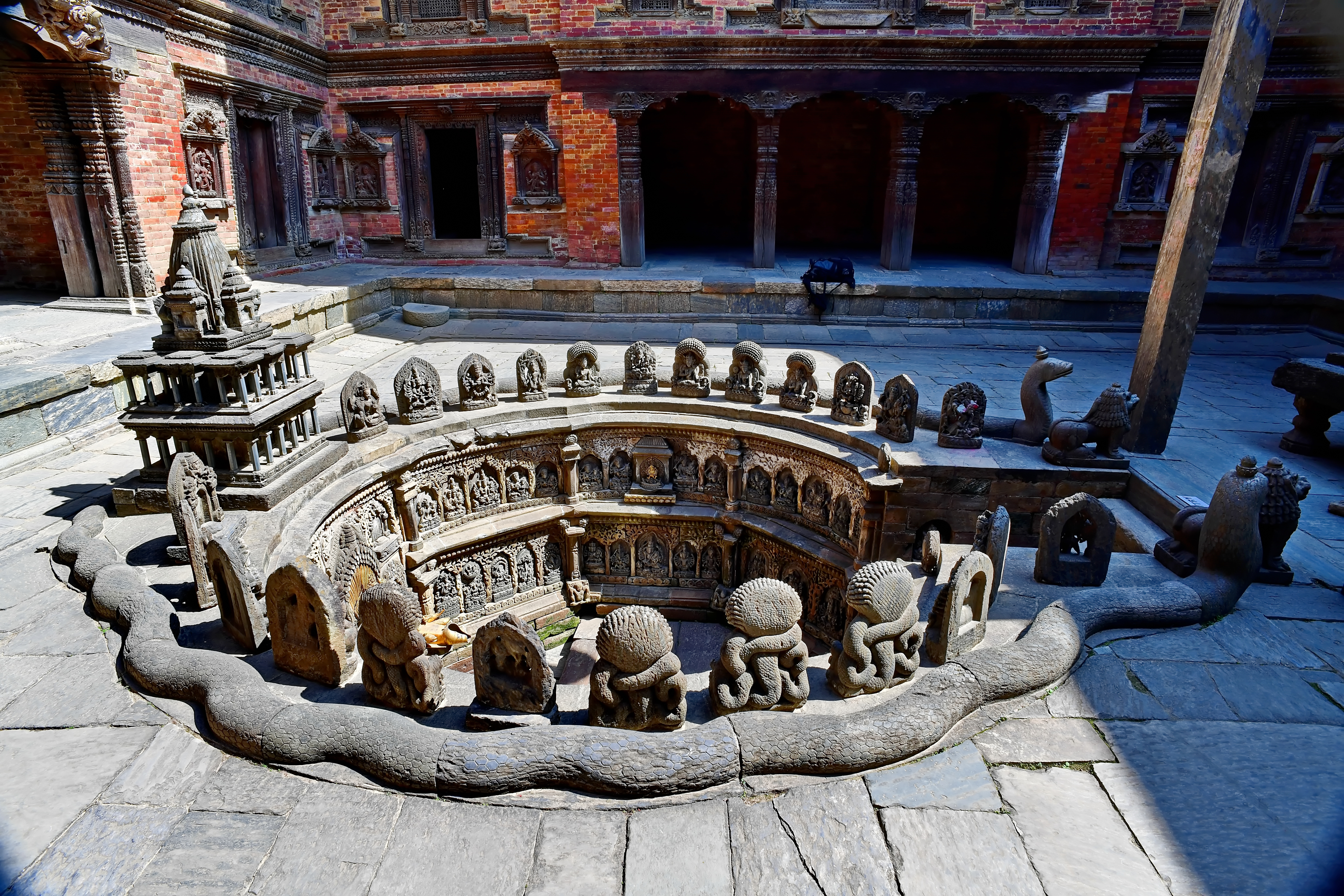
Tusha Hiti

The early 19th-century Nepalese song Rajamati names three dhunge dharas of Kathmandu: Thahiti, Kwahiti and Maruhiti. The protagonist of the song trips and falls in Maruhiti. Some scenes of the 1995 film based on the song are actually filmed at Maruhiti. Kontihiti and Manga Hiti can be seen briefly as well.

In 1974, Pier Paolo Pasolini used Tusha Hiti, Narayan Hiti and Saraswati Hiti in Patan, along with other places in Nepal, as locations for his film Il fiore delle Mille e una notte (Arabian Nights).

Tusha Hiti also doubled as the king's bath in the 1993 film Little Buddha by Bernardo Bertolucci. Nag Pokhari hiti in Bhaktapur was also used for the film.

The inner workings of the dhunge dhara system in Kathmandu are an essential part of the plot in the story The Case of Hodgson's Ghost from the 2003 detective novel The Oriental Casebook of Sherlock Holmes by Ted Riccardi.

The song Surkhetma Bulbule Taal from the 2004 film Bandhaki was partly filmed at the stone spouts of Bulbule Lake.

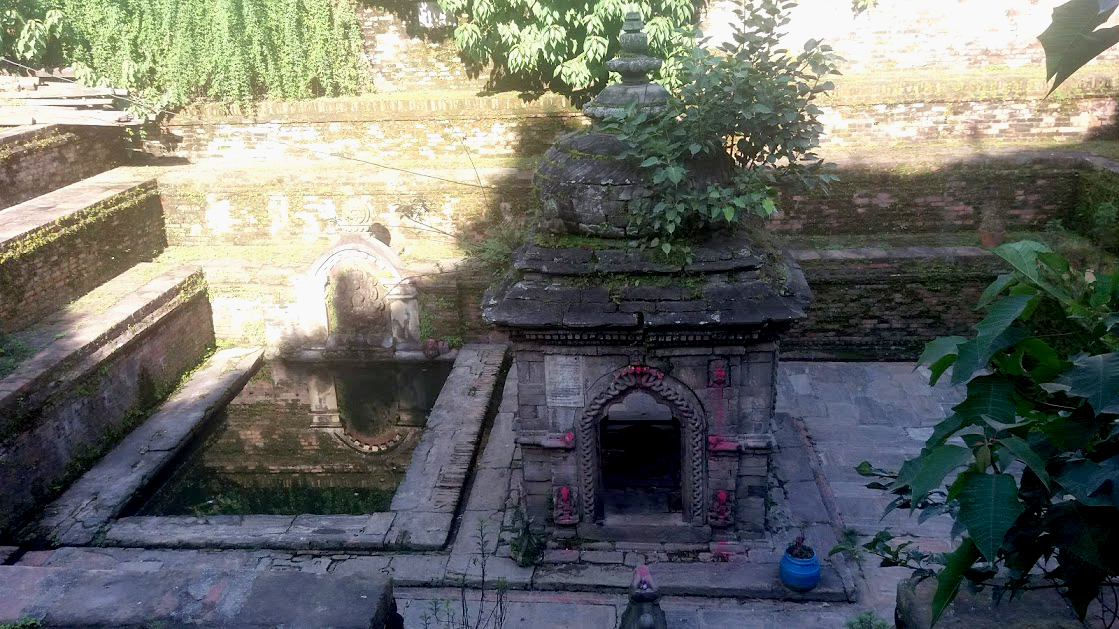
Garuda Kunda in Bhaktapur

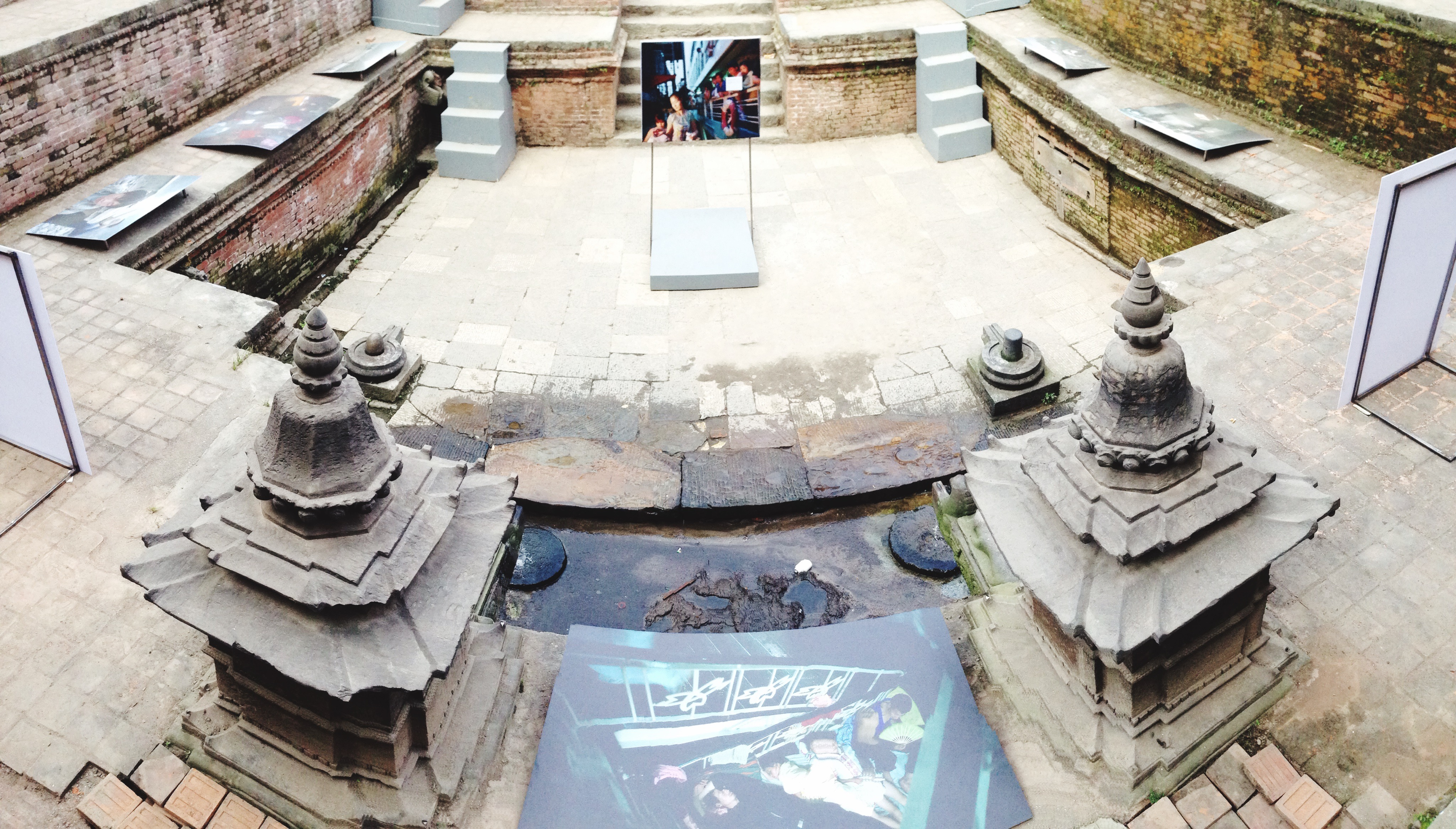
Photo exhibit in Saugah Hiti in 2016

Garuda Kunda in Bhaktapur was used to film a clip of the Newari song Basanta Ya Phe.

In 2015, around the time of the earthquakes, a community arts project was organised, centered around the hitis of Patan. Women living in the area told stories and created works of visual art about their relationships with water and health during the Sacred Water project.

In 2016 Manga Hiti featured in a romantic music video. In 2017 Manga Hiti was also used for an interactive audiovisual installation.

The opening credits of the 2016 Newari film Chandraman were filmed at Chhaybaha Hiti in Patan.

In June 2020, a short horror film titled Dhunge Dhara, by Sujan Shrestha and Melina Shrestha, was posted on YouTube. It is reminiscent of the 2002 film The Ring and takes place in a dhunge dhara. The same dhunge dhara also appears briefly in another short film by Rajani Shrestha.

Part of the music video for the Nepal Bhasa song Lhwo Hiti La Ka Wala was filmed at a Subahal Hiti in Patan.

Eros Ink Tattoo studio in Kathmandu showcases a tattoo of Nag Pokhari hiti in Bhaktapur on its website.

Dhunge Dhara is the title of a Dohori Teej song published online on 30 June 2022. Part of the clip is filmed at a dhunge dhara.

=== Events space ===
The international photography festival Photo Kathmandu has used the spaces of dhunge dharas in Patan more than once. Manga Hiti was the location of a photo slideshow in 2015 and 2016. Chyasal Dhungedhara and Saugah Hiti hosted a photo exhibit during the festival in 2015 and 2016 respectively.

In June 2019 Manga Hiti was the location of the 2019 finale of the international Dopper Changemaker competition.

The terraced space of Nagbahal Hiti has been used as a music venue on several occasions.

== Similar structures outside Nepal ==
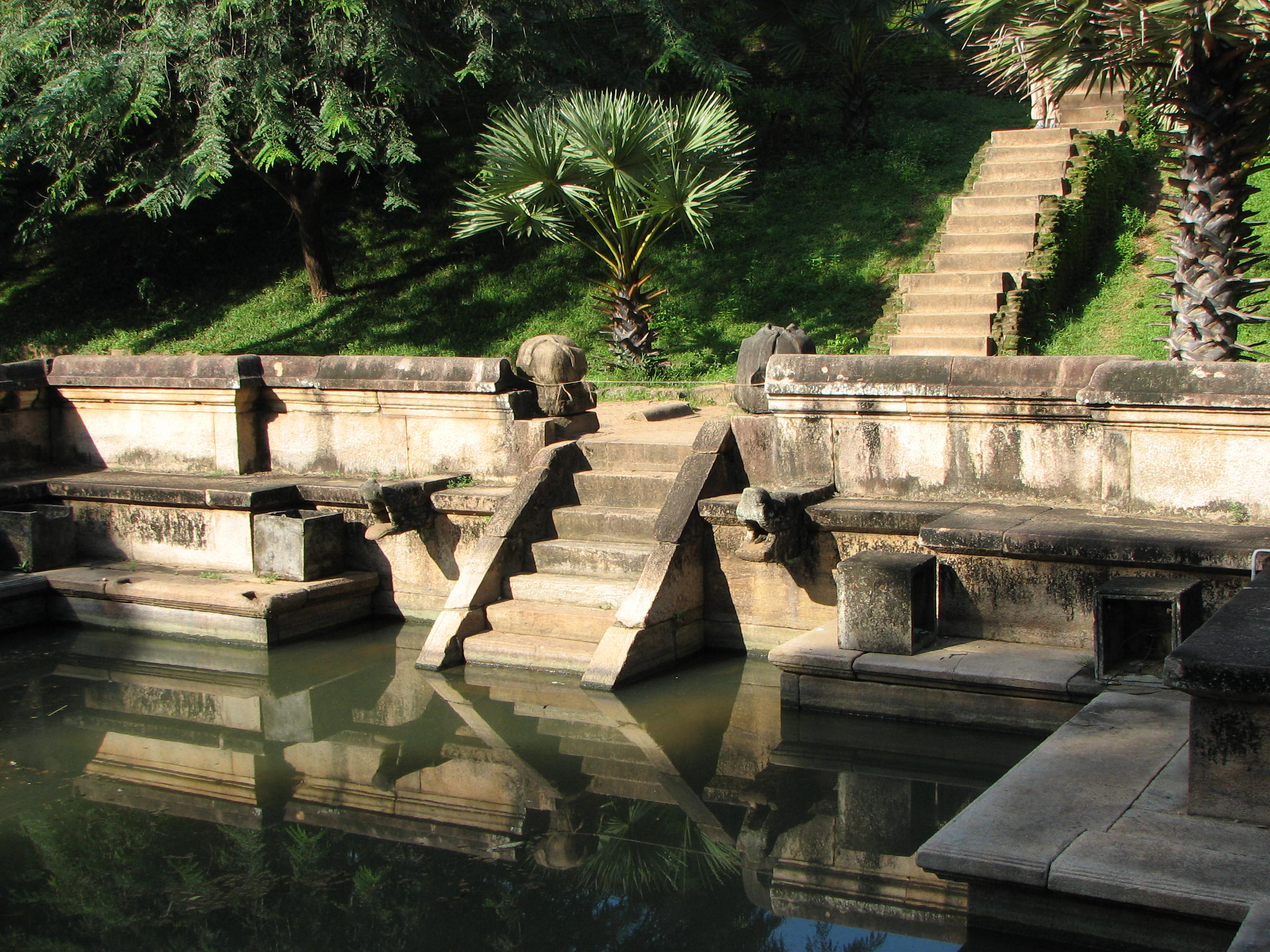
Kumara Pokuna in Polonnaruwa, Sri Lanka, with stone spouts on both sides of the stairs

Although dhunge dharas can be viewed as typical Nepalese buildings, a number of similar structures can be found in other countries. One example can be seen in India. It is the kunda of Sule Basti in Humcha, Karnataka, known as the source of the Kumudvathi River. Two other examples are in Sri Lanka: Kuttam Pokuna in Anuradhapura and Kumara Pokuna in Polonnaruwa. The structures in Sri Lanka differ from the dhunge dharas of Nepal in that the basins themselves are designed to hold the water for a longer period of time instead of draining it away immediately.

== Tun and tutedhara ==
The construction of water conduits like hitis, dug wells and jahrus is considered a pious act in Nepal.

Circular dug wells can be found in most cities and villages of Nepal. They are called inara (Nepali) or tun (Newari). They are lined with bricks and have a brick parapet with stone on top. In case there are any decorations, these are usually water related, like lotus flowers, makaras and snakes. Many of them date from the Licchavi era. It is estimated that more than a 1000 old dug wells can be found in Kathmandu Valley. Many of them are still being used.

Some dhunge dharas have such a well built into their basin. Kva Hiti in Kathmandu is an example and so is Golmadhi Hiti in Bhaktapur.

Another structure is the tutedhara or jahru (jarun, jaladroni), a (usually) covered drinking water reservoir built out of stone with a tap that can be opened and closed. These structures are either free-standing or integrated into the wall of a hiti or other building. They depend on either a tun or a hiti to be filled. In a hiti this reservoir is used to store the excess water that flows into the dhunge dhara.

Many jahrus, especially the ones not part of a hiti, are no longer in use.

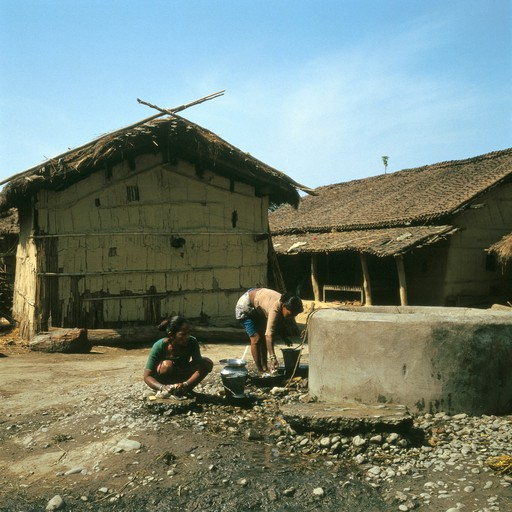
Village well in Terai Region

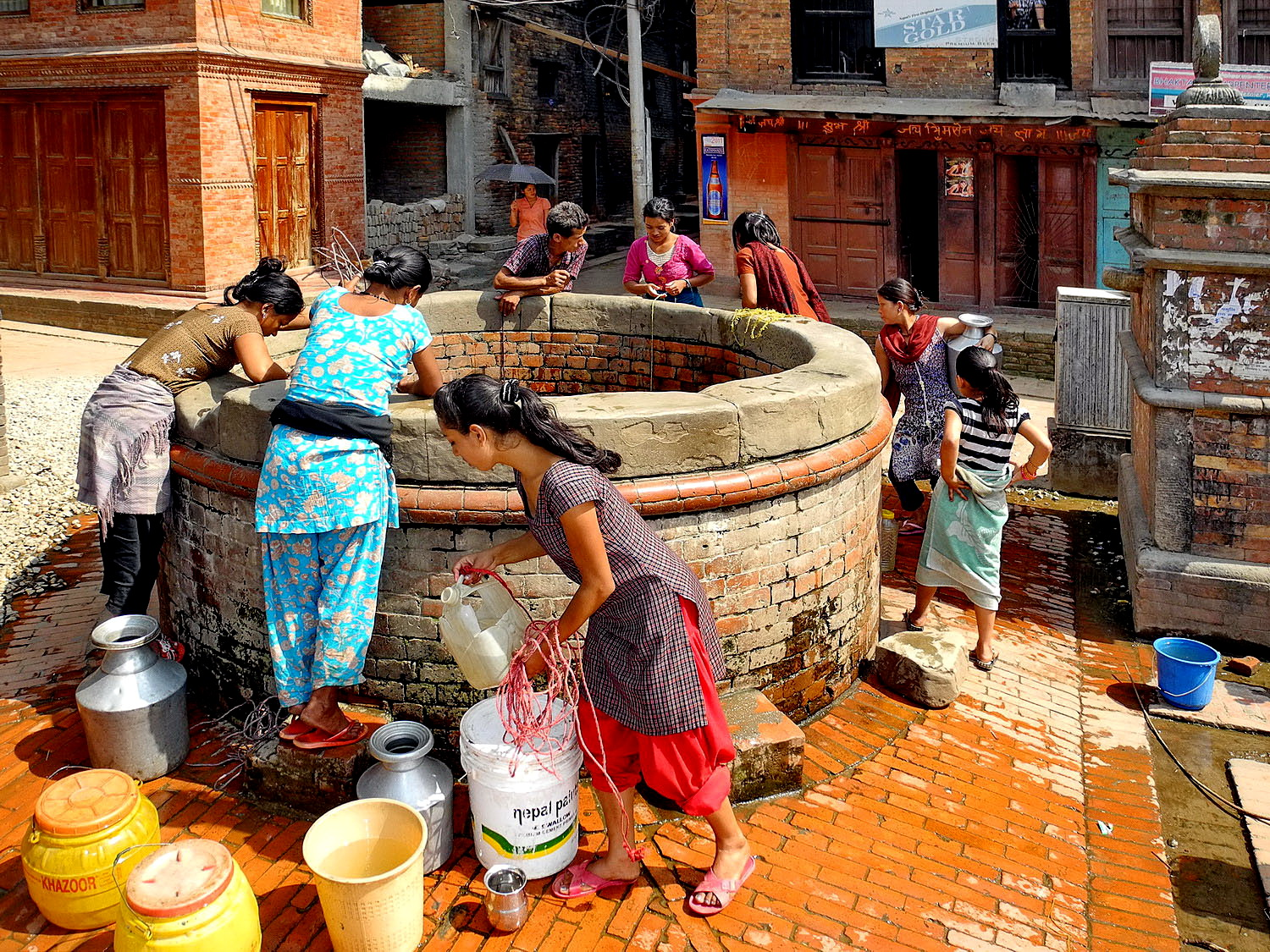
Well in Bhaktapur

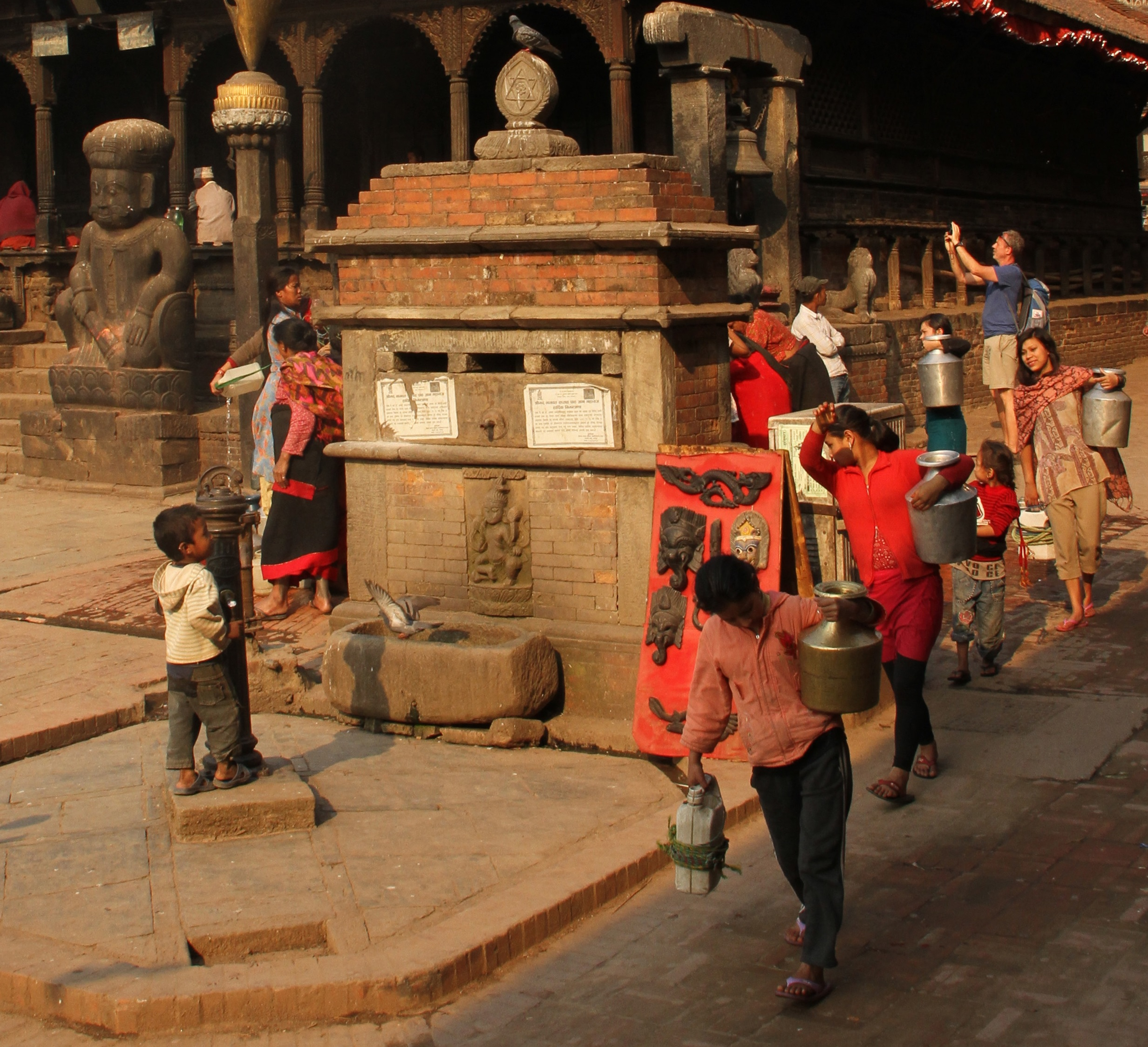
Jahru next to the well

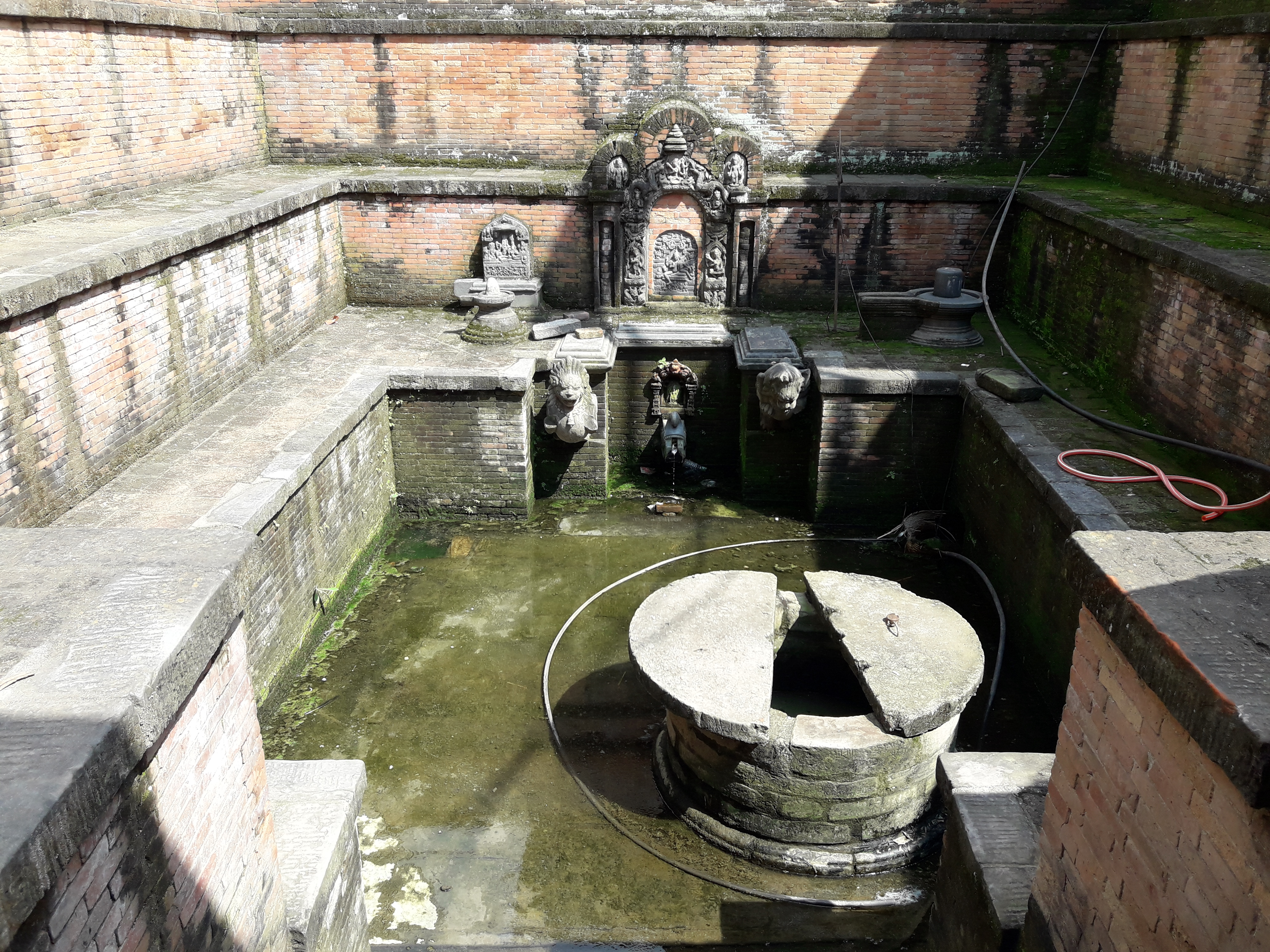
Well in Golmadhi Hiti, Bhaktapur

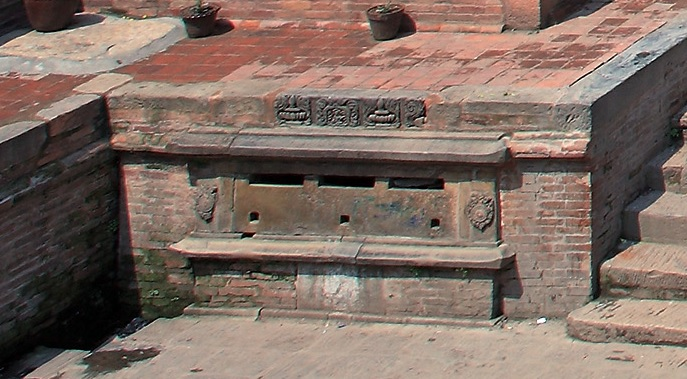
Jarun of Manga Hiti in Patan

== See also ==
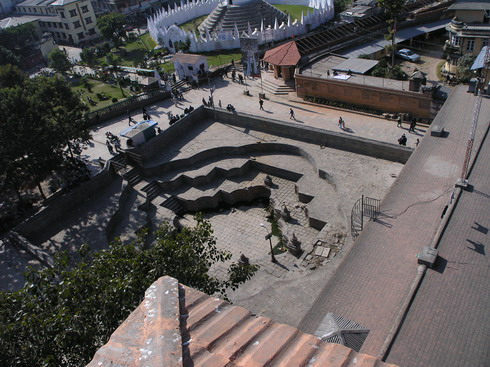
Mandala-shaped Sundhara in Kathmandu, built in 1829

- Alko Hiti
- Gosaikunda
- Ikha Pokhari
- Kamal Pokhari
- Naag Pokhari
- Nagbahal Hiti
- Pimbahal Pond
- Rajkulo
- Rani Pokhari
- Thanthu Darbar Hiti
- Tusha Hiti
- Tutedhara
