= Dharamshala (type of building) =

Type of sanctuary, communal or religious resthouse

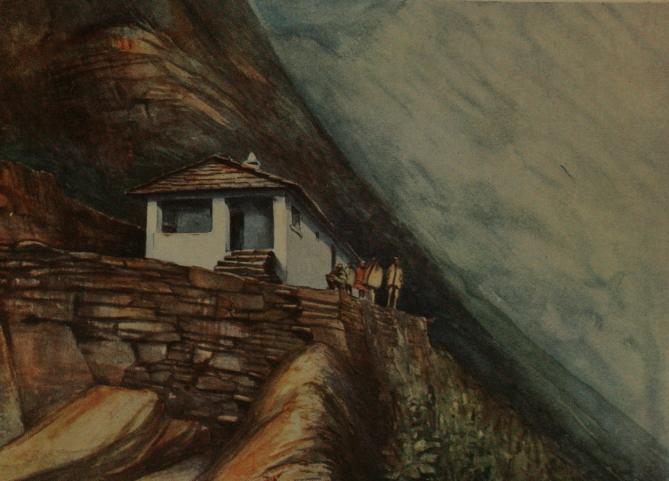
A Dharamshala in Tibet

A dharamshala, also written as dharmashala, is a public resthouse or shelter in the Indian subcontinent. It also refers to Sikh places of worship before the introduction of Gurdwaras. Just as sarai are for travellers and caravans, dharamshalas are built for Hindu religious travellers at Hindu pilgrimage sites. In Nepal there are dharamshalas especially built for pilgrims as well as dharamshalas for locals. Dharamshalas fell out of use with the rise of hotels as a part of the burgeoning tourism industry.

== Etymology ==
Dharamshala (Devanagari: धर्मशाला; ITRANS: Dharmashaalaa; IAST: Dharmaśālā) is a word (derived from Sanskrit) that is a compound of dharma (धर्म) and shālā (शाला). A loose translation into English would be 'spiritual dwelling' or, more loosely, 'sanctuary'. Rendering a precise literal translation into English is problematic due to the vast and conceptually rich semantic field of the word dharma, and the cultural aspect of India.

In common Hindu usage, the word dharamshala refers to a shelter or rest house for spiritual pilgrims. Traditionally, such dharamshalas (pilgrims' rest houses) were commonly constructed near pilgrimage destinations (which were often located in remote areas) to give visitors a place to sleep for the night.

=== Transcription and pronunciation ===
Due to a lack of uniform observance of transliteration and transcription conventions for Hindi (and the Devanagari script in which Hindi is written), the name of the town has been transcribed into English (and other languages using Romanic scripts) variously as Dharamshala, Dharamsala and, less frequently, Dharmshala and Dharmsala. These four permutations result from two variables: the transcription of the word धर्म (dharma)—particularly the second syllable (र्म)—and that of the third syllable (शा).

A strict transliteration of धर्म as written would be 'dharma' [ˈdʱərma]. In the modern spoken Hindi of the region, however, there is a common metathesis in which the vowel and consonant sounds in the second syllable of certain words (including धर्म) are transposed, which changes 'dharma' to 'dharam' (pronounced somewhere between [ˈdʱərəm] and [ˈdʱərm], depending on the speaker). Thus, if the goal of the transcription is phonetic accord with modern spoken Hindi, then 'dharam' and 'dharm' are both legitimate options.

The most accurate phonetic transcription of the Hindi धर्मशाला into Roman script for common (non-technical) English usage is either 'Dharamshala' or, less commonly, 'Dharmshala', both of which render the sh (/ʃ/) sound of श in English as 'sh' to convey the correct native pronunciation, 'Dharamshala' [dʱərəmˈʃaːlaː] or 'Dharmshala' [dʱərmˈʃaːlaː]. Nonetheless, the alternate spelling 'Dharamsala' continues to be used in some cases despite its inaccuracy, and all four spelling permutations can be found in the English language materials of the local and state governments, in publications, and on the Internet.

Regardless of spelling variations, however, it is that the correct native pronunciation is with the sh sound (/ʃ/). Therefore, the spelling variant that is most common and most concordant with standards of transcription and native pronunciation is 'Dharamshala'. The official Indian English spelling is 'Dharamshala'. It is both written and pronounced as Dharmaśālā in Nepali.

== Community-specific dharamshala ==
Sometimes a dharmaśālā is built at religious pilgrimages for a specific community, caste, ethnic group, profession or persons from a specific region. The specified pilgrims are generally charged minimal or allowed free stay for a limited duration at a Dharamshala specifically built for them but other pilgrims may be charged higher amounts.

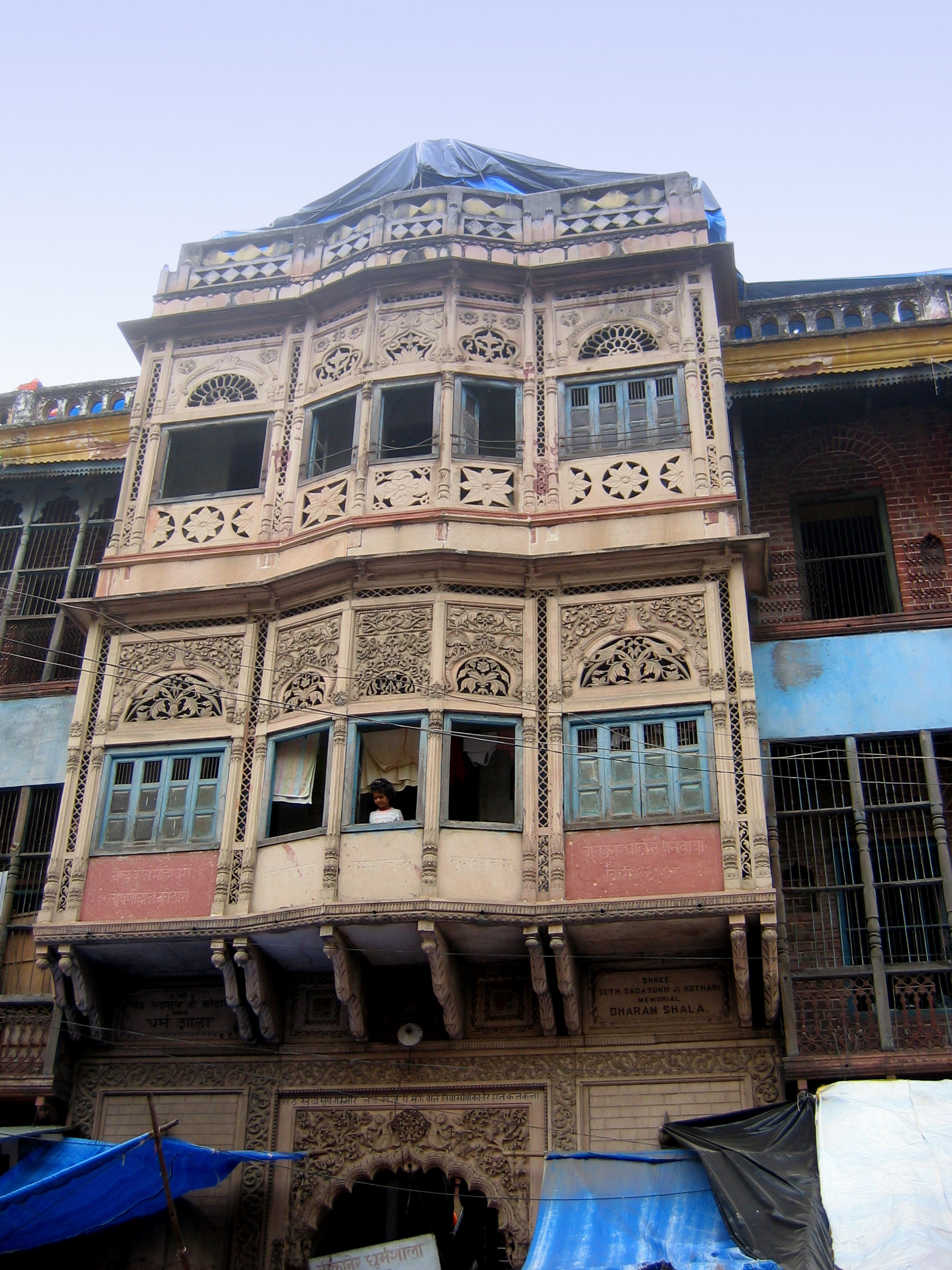
Seth Sadasukh Gambhir Chand Kothari Dharamshala, Haridwar. Donated by a businessman in 1822

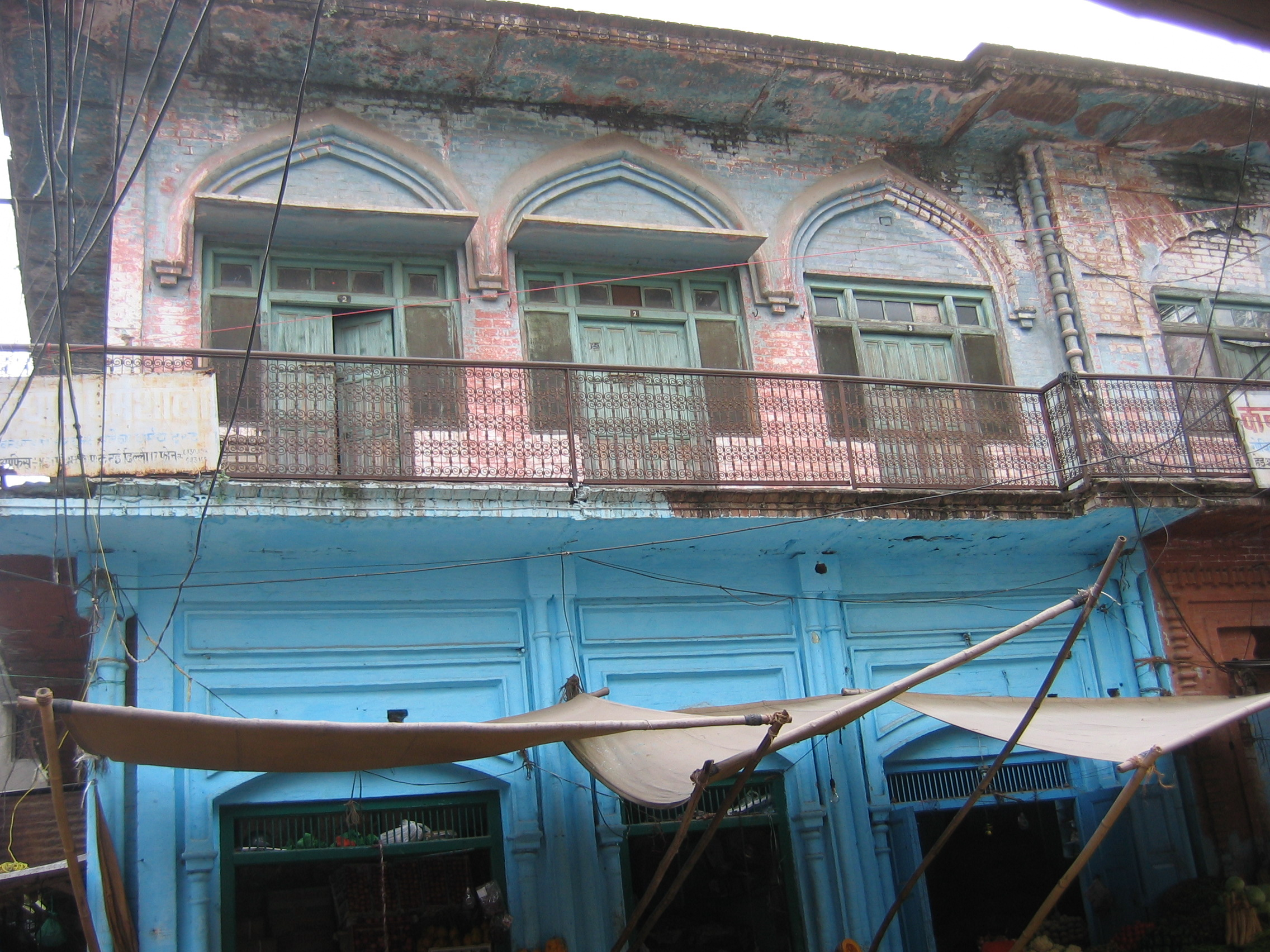
Dharamshala at Haridwar

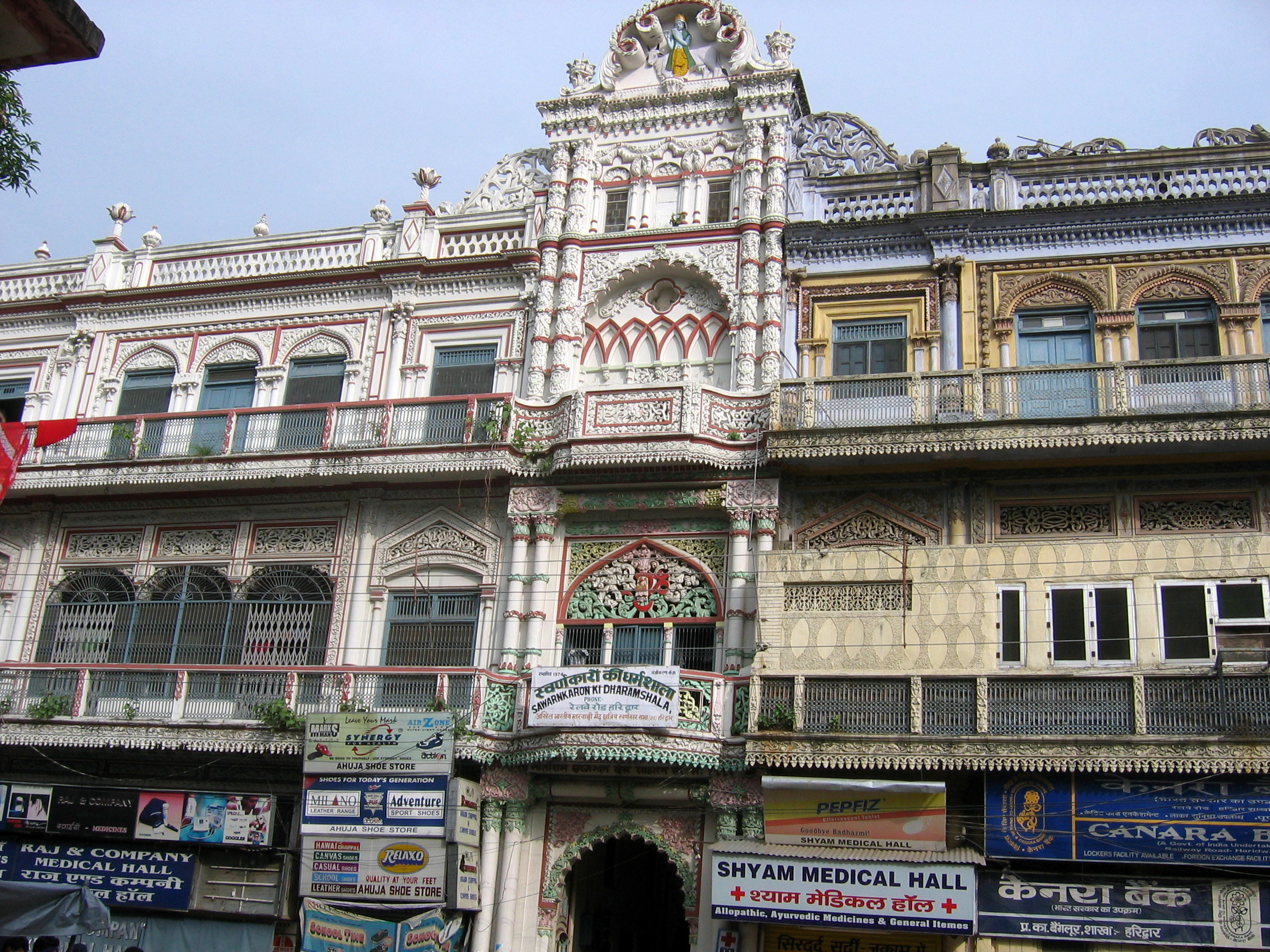
Sawarankaron ki Dharamshala (Resthouse for Goldsmiths), Railway road, Haridwar.

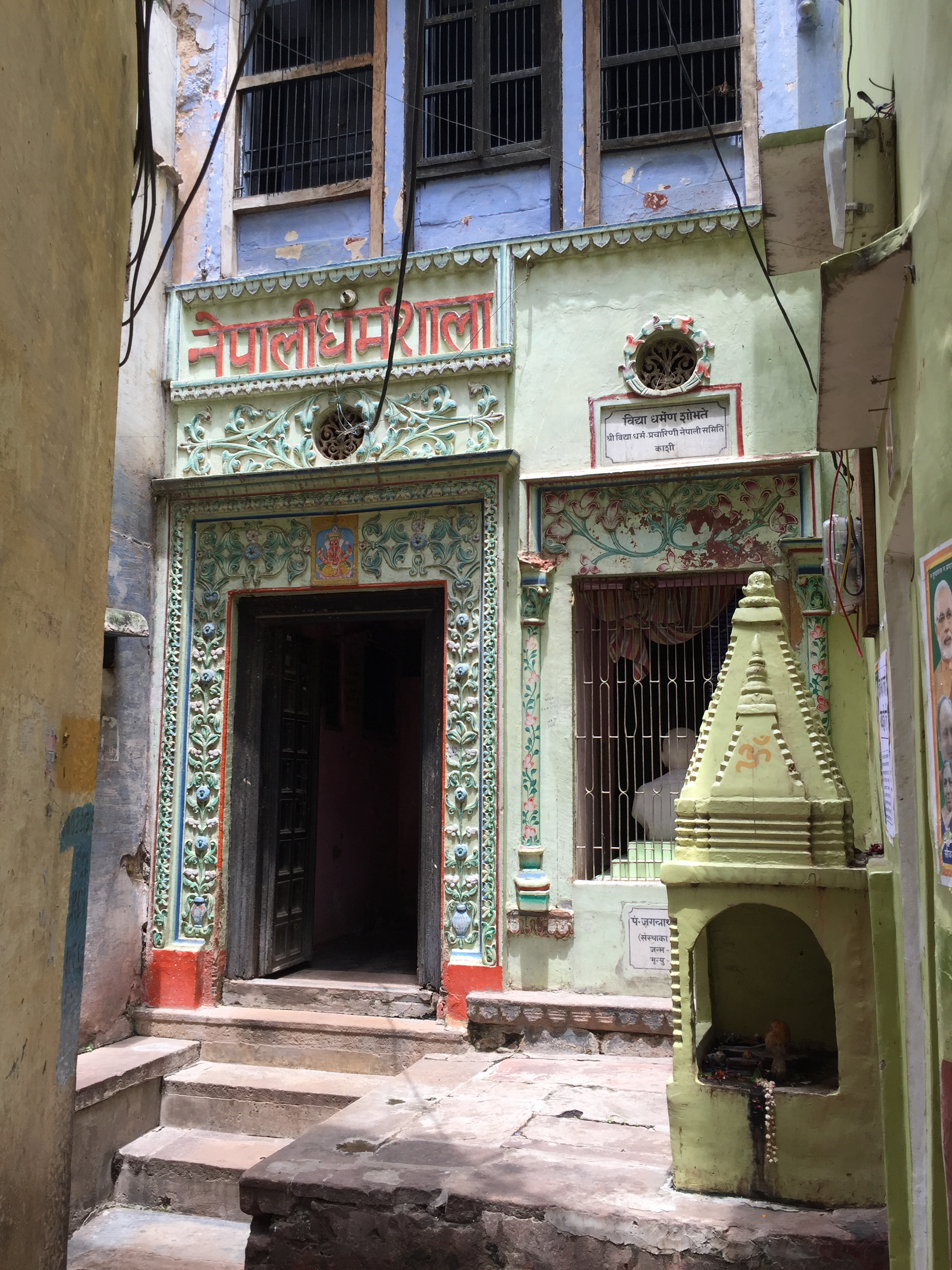
Dharamshala for Nepali students and religious pilgrims in Varanasi.

== Nepalese dharmashalas ==
In Nepal, dharmashalas can be found in every village and city. More often than not they have a social and cultural significance rather than a religious one. Usually there is a source of drinking water (a well, a dhunge dhara or a tutedhara) nearby. There are three different types of dharmashala: a pati, a sattal and a mandapa.

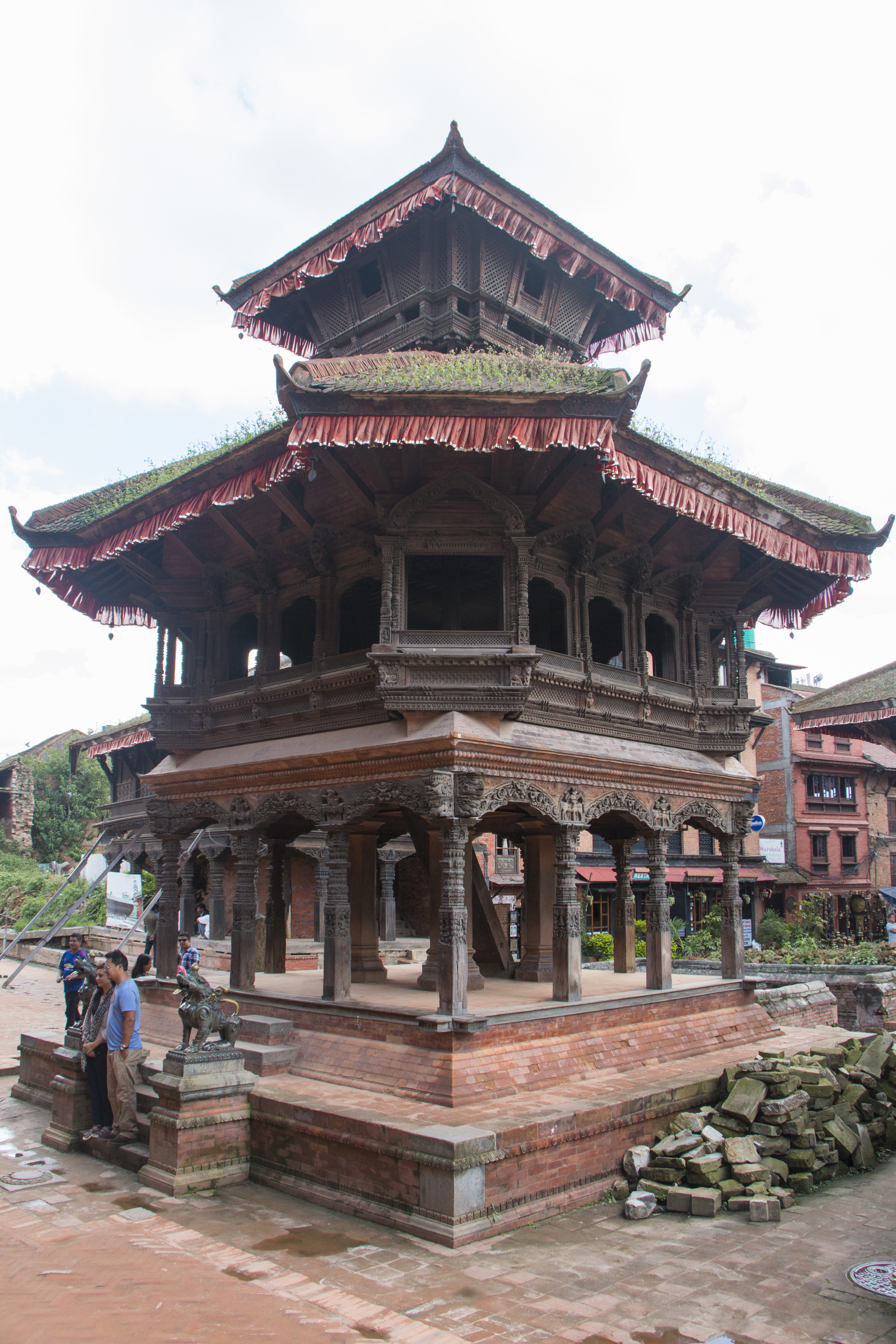
Chyasilin Mandap in Bhaktapur

=== Patis ===
Patis or palchas are the simplest of the three types. They consist of a platform made of stone and brick, with wooden floorboards. Wooden pillars support a sloping roof. The back of the pati is a brick wall. The other sides are usually open. Patis can be either free standing of connected to another building, like a house or a dhunge dhara. Patis can be rectangular, L-shaped, T-shaped, U-shaped, curved or circular. The rectangular shape and the L shape are the most common. Patis are the smallest of the dharmashalas but some can be up to 32 bays long. Patis are found within cities and villages, but also on the side of the road, often near a source of water.

In Patan, fourteen patis house parts of the chariot used for the Rato Machindranath Jatra. Preparations for the festival begin with the construction of a 60-foot tall chariot at Pulchok at the western end of the city.

=== Sattals ===
Sattals have one or two extra, usually closed, storeys on top of a pati-like structure. The ground floor is mostly open on three sides. Sattals are resting places, not just for the day, but also for overnight stays. One example of such a building is Singha Sattal.

=== Mandapas ===
Mandapas are square, freestanding buildings, much like patis, but they are open on all sides. The simplest mandapa is a platform with a roof, which rests on sixteen wooden pillars. Two of such mandapas can be found on either side of the entrance stairs of Manga Hiti in Patan. Mandapas can also have multiple storeys, like the Kasthamandap in Kathmandu and the Chyasilin Mandap in Bhaktapur.

Chyasilin Mandap was built in the eighteenth century, but completely destroyed during the 1934 earthquake. Architects Götz Hagmüller and Niels Gutschow rebuilt it, using old paintings and early twentieth century photographs as a reference. With the help of locals who had survived the 1934 earthquake, they managed to locate eight of the original pillars and some other fragments of the old building. Dr. Walther Mann, an expert on earthquake proof architecture, created an internal framework of steel and concrete. Craftsmen from Bhaktapur and Patan recreated all the other parts. The work was completed in 1990. Thanks to the controversial choice to use contemporary technology to strengthen the structure, Chyasilin Mandap survived the 2015 earthquakes without damage.

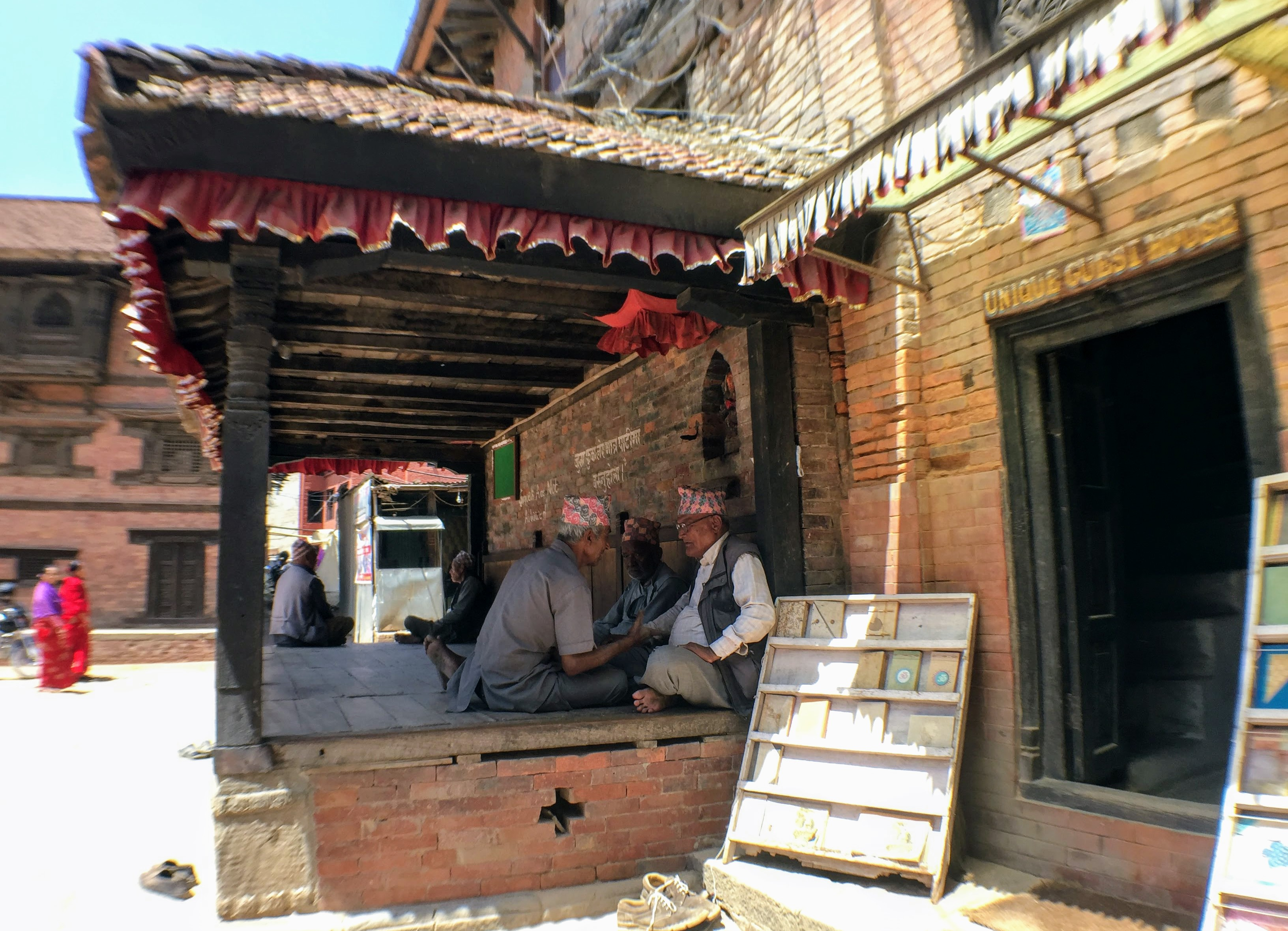
Typical pati in a street in Bhaktapur

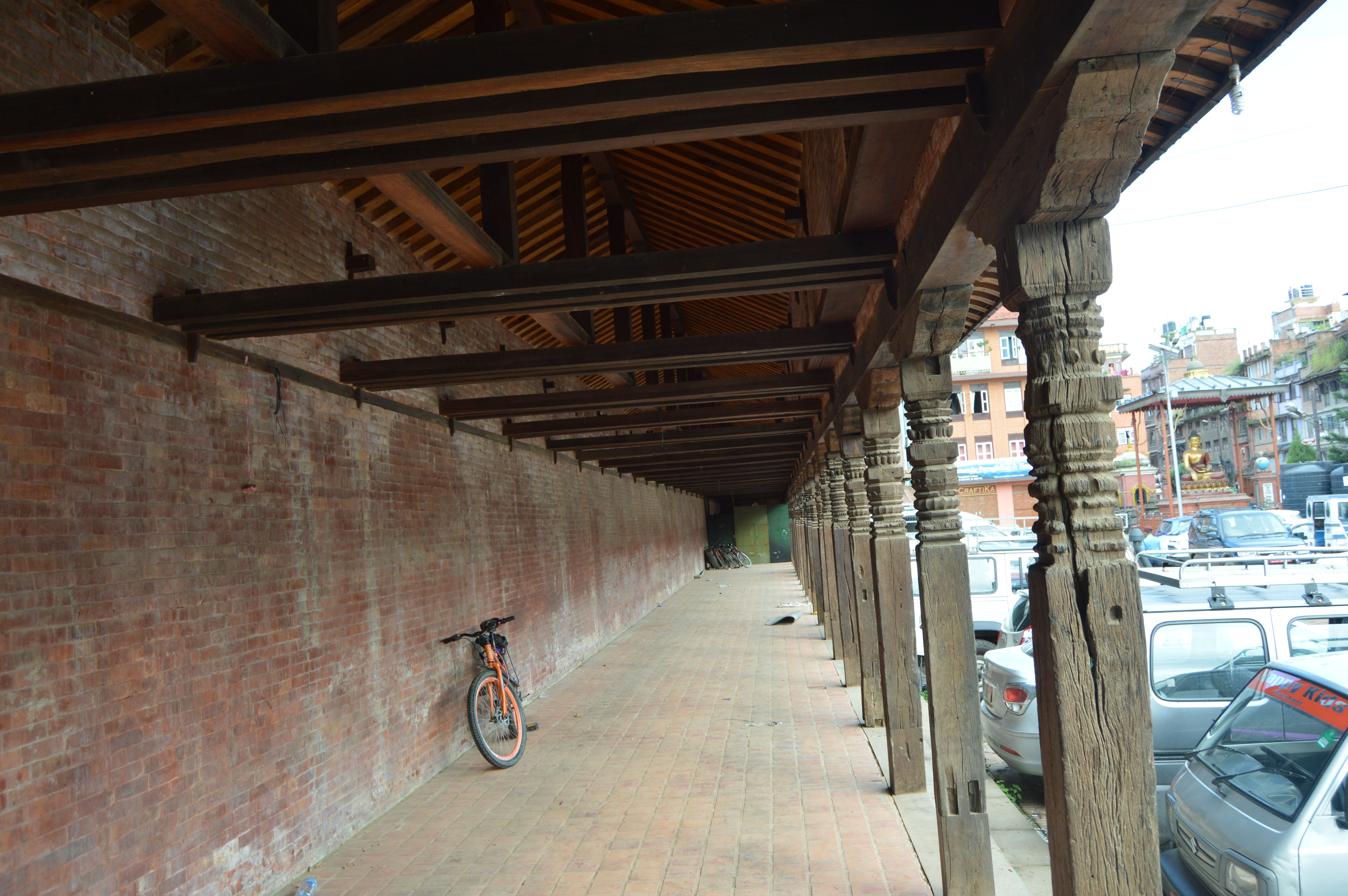
The long Kotpati in Patan

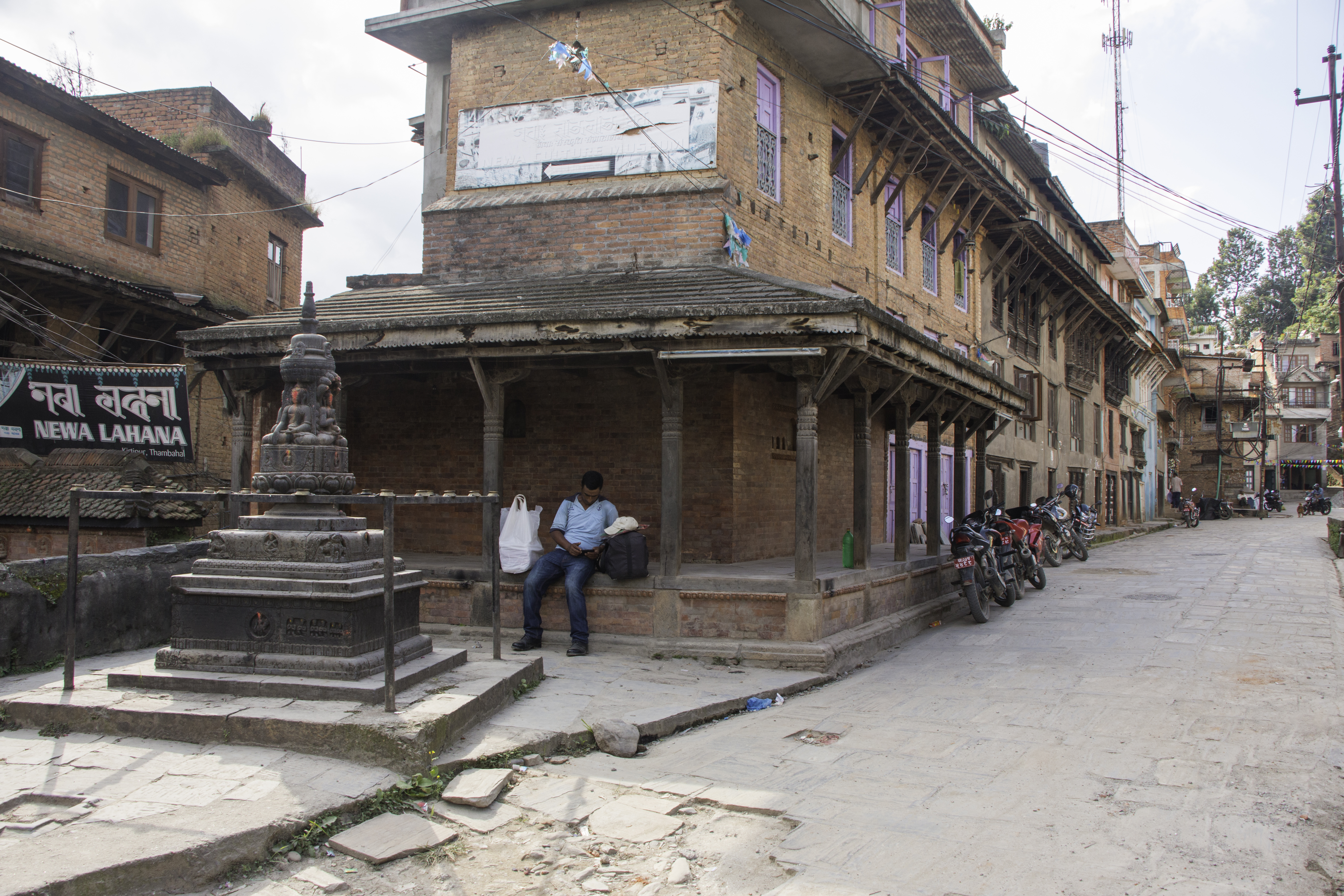
L-shaped pati in Kirtipur

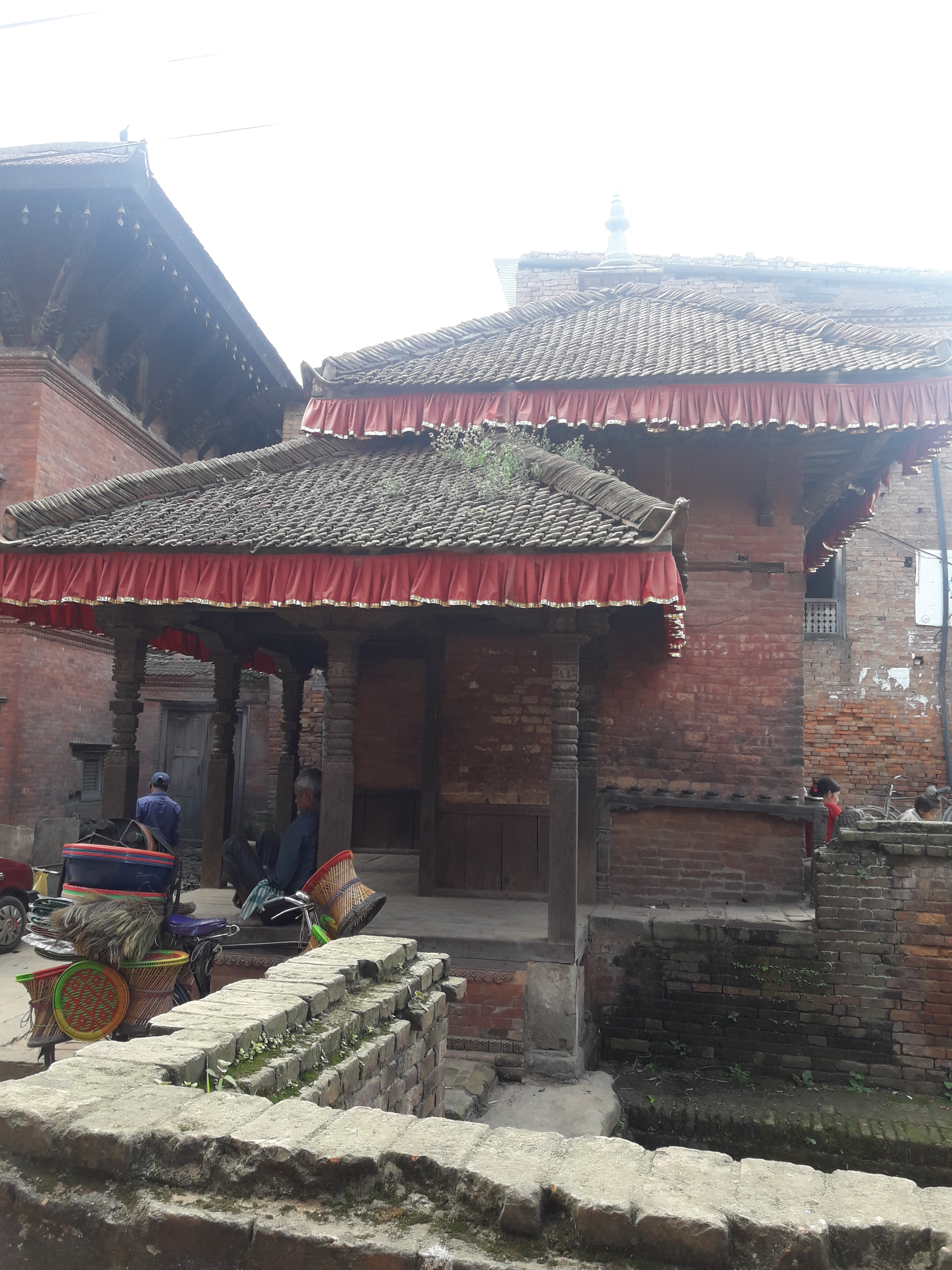
Pati at dhungedhara in Bhaktapur

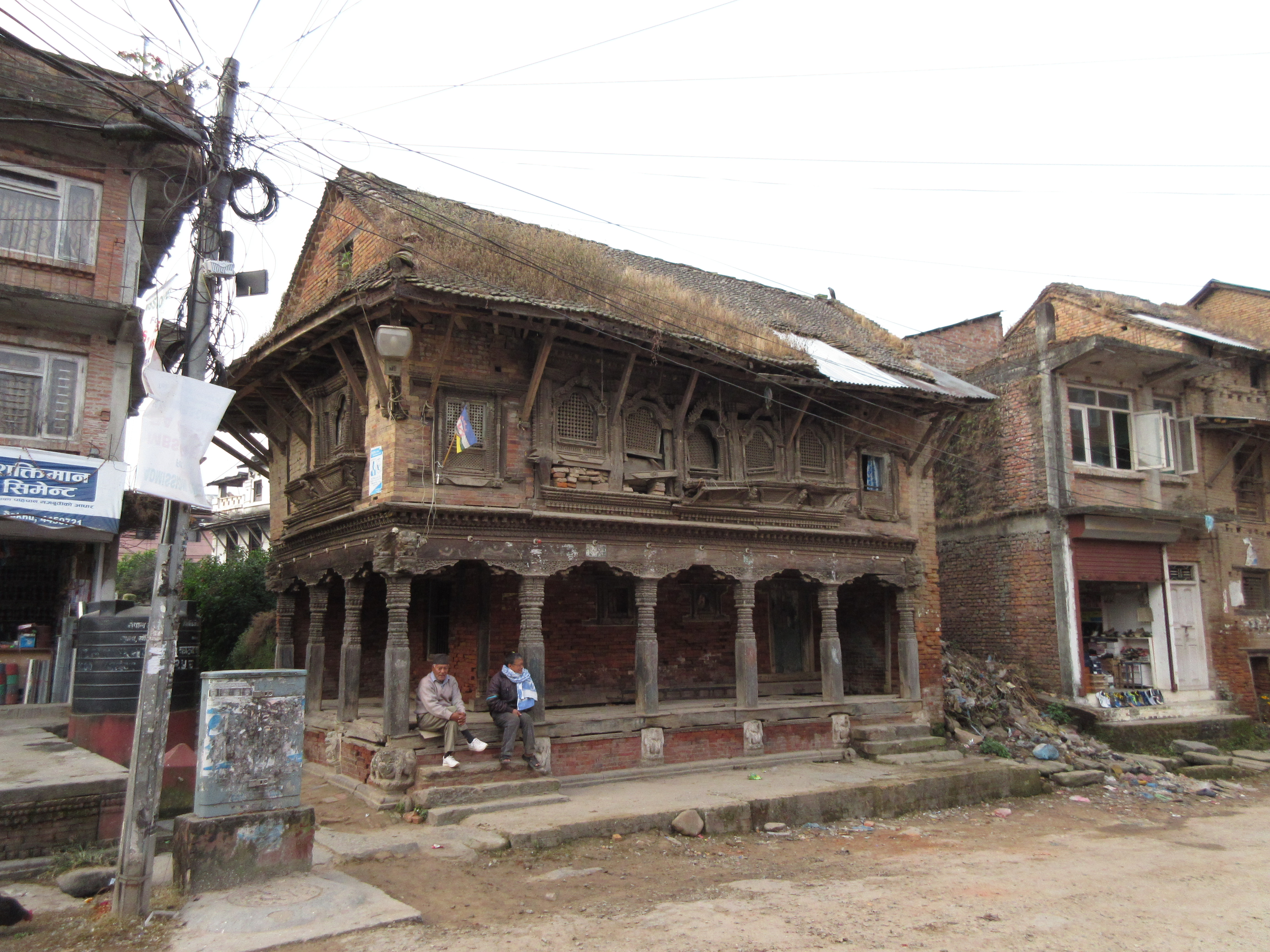
Sattal in Sankhu

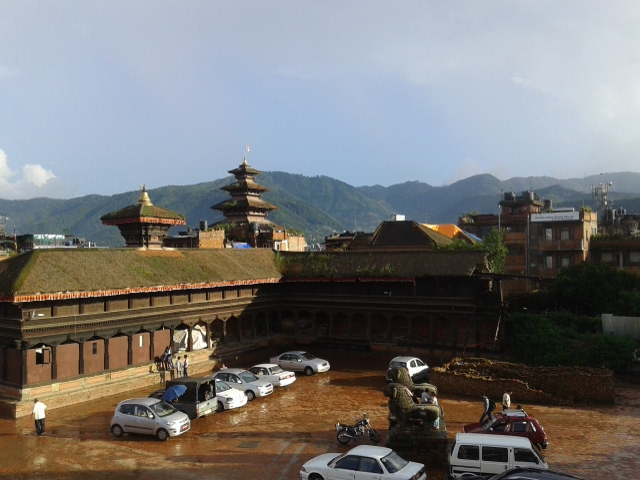
Hari Shankar Sattal in Bhaktapur with earthquake damage

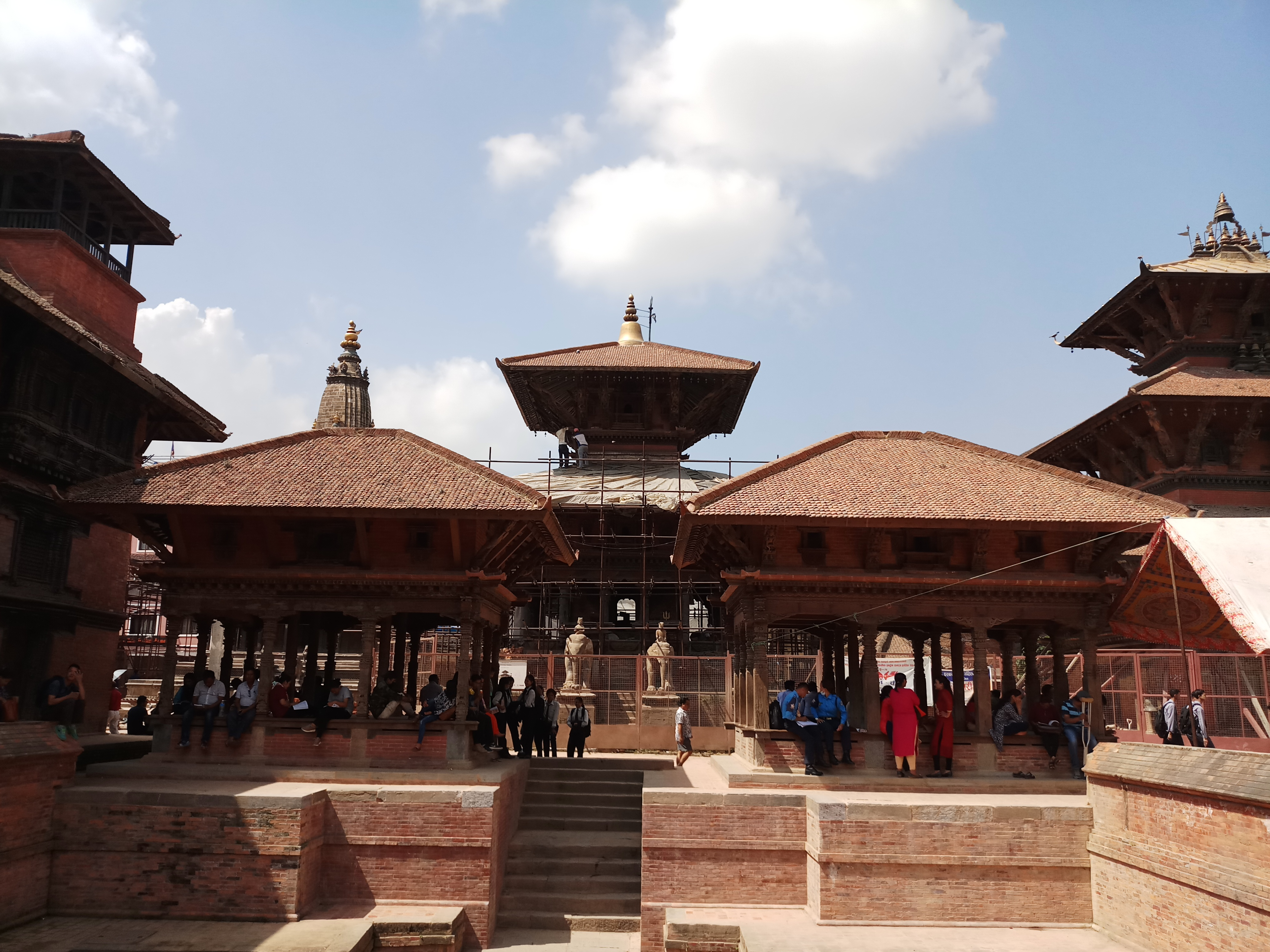
The two mandapas at Manga Hiti in Patan

During the past century many dharmashalas have been converted into shops, restaurants and other private spaces.

== Sikh dharamsals ==
=== Origin ===
Sikhs believe that Guru Nanak was ordained directly by God to construct dharamsāls (places of worship; meaning ‘abode of righteousness’), as per the B.40 Janamsakhi:

As the Vaisnavas have their temple, the yogis their asan, and the Muslims their mosque, so your followers shall have their dharamsala. Three things you must inculcate in your Panth: repeating the divine Name, giving charity, and regular bathing. Keep yourself unspotted while yet remaining a householder.

— B.40 Janamsakhi translated by W.H. McLeod, The Evolution of the Sikh Community (1975), page 30

The above statement separates the institution of Sikh dharamsals from those of other faiths, ordaining it as an independent institution based upon Sikhism alone. The first centre was built in Kartarpur, on the banks of Ravi River in the Punjab region by the first Sikh guru, Guru Nanak Dev in the year 1521. It now lies in the Narowal District of west Punjab (Pakistan). During the time of Guru Nanak, Sikh places of worship were known as dharamsals where kirtan was conducted by the early Sikh congregation.

The worship centres were built as a place where Sikhs could gather to hear the guru give spiritual discourse and sing religious hymns in the praise of Waheguru.

The institution of Gurdwara evolved out of Dharamsals.

=== Spread ===
Guru Nanak would arrange early Sikh followers into various sangat congregations or parishes and instructed them to erect a dharamsal dedicated to spreading their Guru's message and teachings in their local area.

Bhai Gurdas states the following:

“Wherever Guru Nanak visited, that place became a place of worship. The most important centres including those of the jogis visited by the Guru became spiritual centres. Even houses have been turned into dharamsalas where kirtan was sung on the eve of Vaisakhi.”

— Bhai Gurdas

Guru Nanak set-up an important dharamsal in the new-found Kartarpur after settling there. Other important dharamsals were located in Khadur, Goindwal, Ramdaspur, Tarn Taran, Kartarpur (Doaba) and Sri Hargobindpur, all of whom had been directly founded upon the instruction of a Sikh guru. When the Manji system and the later Masand systems of preachers and dioceses was set-up, they were directed to found a dharamsal in their dedicated area of missionary work. Passionate early Sikhs would found dharamsals at various places across the Indian subcontinent and in Afghanistan as a means of expressing their devotion to the faith. Udasis were commanded by Guru Hargobind and his successors to found dharamsals in the distant reaches of the subcontinent far from the nucleus of Sikh centrality and rejuvenate the abandoned, dilapidated, or struggling dharamsals which had been founded by Guru Nanak and his followers in faraway places, which struggled due to their extreme distance from the central Sikh authority located mainly in Punjab. Guru Tegh Bahadur founded new dharamsal centres during his missionary tours of the Malwa region of Punjab and in northeastern India. Dharamsals were also established on trade routes utilized by Sikh Khatri merchants, especially upon the routes between Chitagong-to-Kabul plus Agra-to-Burhampur.

=== Structure and operation ===
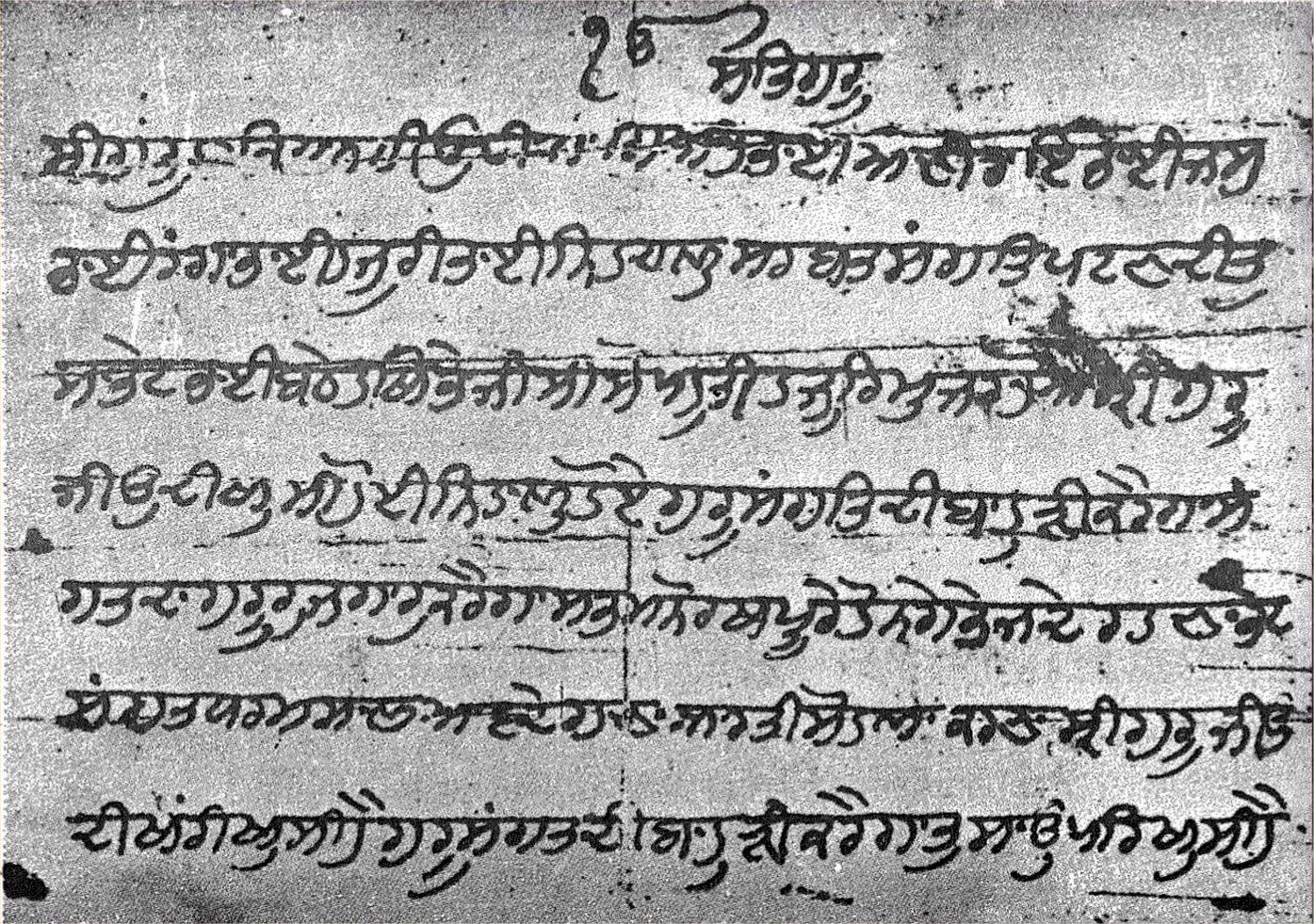
Hukamnama (edict) issued by Guru Har Krishan to the Sangat (Sikh congregation) of Pakpattan requesting them to attend daily functions at the Dharamsaal and to perform Kirtan Sohila prayers and praises of God, ca.1661–1664

The dharamsals were simple constructions and modest buildings, usually just consisting of a single humble room to house the local devotees of a locality for prayers. This was especially true in the rural areas, villages, and small towns where most of the local Sikh congregations consisted of simple peasants with little means of wealth. They were not built upon a specific axis because Sikhs believe God in omnipresent and the entire Earth is divine and equally fitting as such. The Adi Granth was installed at dharamsals after its codification and introduction in 1604. The dharamsals likely did not contain intricate and ornate furniture, fittings, and other decorative accessories, unlike modern-day gurdwaras. Dharamsals incorporated a body of water for public bathing due to the importance placed upon isnan (customary bathing in the morning) in Sikhism. Wherever natural sources of water were not readily available, a baoli (step-well), bucket well, or rahat (Persian wheel) would be implemented and installed in the courtyard of the structure or near a pool of water. The dharamsals incorporated a langar (communal kitchen) and lodge, especially the ones on important highways and trade routes, where persons could eat and stay without discriminated based upon their religious or caste-background. This facilitated the fast spread of Sikhism throughout the Punjab. Some dharamsals contained a hospital ward where the sick and injured could receive treatment. Other dharamsals incorporated carpentry workshops to construct beds and other needed furniture. The dharamsals often contained a school where one could learn Gurmukhi, Sikh music, and interpretation of Sikh scriptures. The dharamsals were known or named after the area they belonged to.

Local Sikhs performed individual worship in their homes and communal worship at the dharamsals. Worship was performed at specific times (nitnem) and centred around the Adi Granth at the dharamsal. In the morning, the Japji Sahib prayer was performed at the dharamsal during the morning hours. Sodar, Aarti and Sohila prayers were performed in the evening hours at the dharamsal by the early Sikhs. Interfaith dialogues were also held within dharamsals.

In the courtyard of the dharamsal, diwans (religious assemblies) and jor melas (religious festivals) would be undertaken. The assemblies in the courtyard were often utilized to discuss topics related to theology, warfare, government, and so-on. Sikh Panchayats ran their courts in the courtyard and passed judgements from there.

=== Roles ===
==== Leaders ====
The main dharamsals located at localities founded by a Sikh guru or connected to their life were managed directly by a Sikh guru whilst the centres in more minor, obscure, or distant localities and areas were headed by an appointed Manjidar, Sangatia, Masand, or communally by the local Sikh congregation without a single discernible leader. Positions of local leaders were not dynastic nor inheritable and it was not a professional duty as they still had to live the life of a householder. They were not allowed to claim divine status for themselves.

At centres directly under the supervision of a Sikh guru, the Guru was responsible for organizing kirtan sessions and recitation of Gurbani, leading prayers at specified times, such as in the morning and evening, receiving visitors, performing katha (religious discourse explaining the tenets, practices, and intrinsicness of Sikhism and exposition of its scriptures), and held dialogues. He also coordinated the langar kitchen to ensure smooth functioning.

Sangatia (also spelt as Sangtias) were head leaders from the local Sikh congregation (sangat) who arose as local leaders based upon personal piety and merit. Anyone could arise to become a Sangatia as there was no established priestly or clergy-class in Sikhism, as long as they were well-learnt and dedicated enough to the religion. Most dharamsals ceased being headed by a Sangatia after the introduction of the Manji and later Masand systems. However, some remained under the leadership of a Sangatia due to the respect some earned.

Manjidars were appointed leaders under the purview of the Guru and were responsible for a specified Manji diocese or parish.

The later Masands were appointed to collect revenue and gifts from the distant dharamsals and congregations for the central Sikh authority, where they were responsible for bringing it to. The Masands from various parishes would congregate with the Sikh guru at his durbar (court) on the occasion of Vaisakhi and present the funds and offerings of the dharamsals under their management to him. They managed distant congregations at a regional and provincial level, such as their finances and inns, and conducted missionary activities. They were assisted in their duties by gumashitas (deputies), which they had the power to appoint. The gumashitas helped manage the group of dharamsals in a province or region, especially ones located in small towns, under the purview of a masand head. Some Masands grew in prominence and influence to such a level that even regions falling out of their assigned region were controlled by them, such as in the case of the Masands of Patna, Burhanpur and Kabul managing the dharamsals located in northeast India, south India, and the Pashtun belt region comprising modern-day Khyber Pakhtunkhwa.

Sangatias and Masands who were unable to attend the meeting with the Sikh guru at his durbar would present their collections and offerings in the form of a hundi (bill of exchange).

==== Other positions ====
At centres directly under the supervision of a Sikh guru, the Guru was assisted in their responsibilities by a special group of Sikhs known as Hazoori Sikhs. Furthermore, the granthis assisted after the introduction of the Adi Granth in the early 17th century. Pathis (reciters) assisted with the recitation of the sacred hymns, known as paath. Rababis, Ragis, and Kirtanis were responsible for performing and teaching Sikh music as a means of worship. Preachers and missionaries, knowledgeable in Sikh theology, were also employed for spreading the religion to the general public. Scribes were needed for the preparation of handwritten manuscripts of the Sikh scriptures and for scribing messages in the form of hukamnamas, which were sent from the central Sikh authority of the Guru's dharamsal to local Sikh congregations and dharamsals. The role of preparing langar and its distribution was assigned to the most "senior" and "resourceful" Sikh of the congregation. In the late 17th century, the position of Diwan arose which assisted the Guru with the management of finances as a dedicated office within the central dharamsal.

Some other duties and responsibilities of the lay visitors and parishioner were:

1. waving a fan to keep the assembled congregation cool during hot weather
2. drawing and collecting water for usage in isnan baths and the washing of feet before entry into the dharamsal compound
3. collecting firewood for powering the communal kitchen
4. cleaning prayer carpets by shaking them and removing collected dust and debris
5. providing massages to fatigued visitors and fellow congregation members
6. distributing food to those eating in the communal kitchen

=== Finances and gifts ===
Dharamsals were not patronized by the Mughal state or local government authorities but rather all finances needed for their successful operation were collected from the local Sikh congregation in the form of the dasvandh tithing and kar-bhent, a special campaign for voluntary offerings made by devotees to the Guru for the needs of the local and central dharamsals. The dharamsals did not rely on the central Sikh authority for funds and were independent units who raised their own funds from amongst their local congregation. Gifts and monetary donations were retained within a golak box located in the hall of the dharamsal where Sikhs would voluntarily contribute funds when visiting for prayers. Another means of sourcing funds was the sukh-manat, where Sikhs would donate money when a wish or desire of theirs was fulfilled as a means of expressing thanks. An additional manner in-which funds and gifts were donated is during a kurmai (wedding) ceremony occurring within the local congregation. A chulia was a donation on behalf of a name of a deceased individual based upon a promise. Local Sikhs provided food resources to the dharamsal, such as in the form of grains and produce, to help with the functioning of the langar. When the finances and gifts were given to the central Sikh dharamsal of the Sikh guru, a hundi (bill of exchange) was recorded.

Funds were used for the propagation of Sikhism, constructions and renovations of dharamsals, running of the communal kitchen and lodge, and payment for the mewra messengers who would deliver hukamnama messages, often requiring travelling great distances to do so. After the militarization of the Sikh community, the funds were used for purchasing military resources. Bhai Gurdas strictly laid out that funds were not allowed to be misappropriated by the Masands and Sangatias for their personal needs and harshly reprobates those heads who do so. However, local heads who had no profession to rely upon were allowed to use the non-monetary offerings for their personal needs and survival.

=== Festivals, ceremonies, and celebrations ===
Weddings, funerals, births, and initiation ceremonies of the local congregation were held in the dharamsal.

During the Sikh festivals of Vaisakhi, Diwali, Maghi, Holi, and Gurparabs, Sikhs were requested to come together publicly at the central dharamsal and present their gifts and offerings to the Sikh guru. Those who were unable to make the trip to the central dharamsal would celebrate at their local dharamsal on these occasions.

=== Women ===
Women were not excluded from entry into the dharamsal but rather it was encouraged. They were not secluded from men nor were they allowed to observe purdah or veiling of their faces.

=== Opposition ===
Many figures showed opposition to the institute of dharamsal, such as Karoria and Goinda Marwaha (chaudhry of Goindwal), the former due to Mughal administrative subjugation and the latter due to financial greed. Noorudin, a Mughal official, opposed the construction of the Tarn Taran dharamsal and seized its construction materials. Mughal emperor Jahangir viewed the dharamsals as being dukan-e-batil (meaning "mart [or shop] of falsehood") and actively tried ceasing their activities.

Shah Jahan ordered that the Lahori dharamsal be converted into a mosque. When Aurangzeb sent out a judgement that temples of kafirs ('infidels') be demolished in 1669, Sikh dharamsals were not spared.

Heretical Sikh sects and displeased descendants of the Sikh gurus who were passed over for the Guruship, often forcibly took possession of dharamsals in their area and exiled the legitimate Sikh gurus and their congregation from them. Some examples are the Mina and Dhirmalia sects, which took over and controlled many dharamsals in the Majha and Doaba regions of the Punjab after having expelled the orthodox Sikh managers from these areas.

Some Yogi and Shaikh groups opposed the establishment and operation of dharamsals in their area, due to the perceived "infiltration" upon their sacred space and zone of authority, this occurred at Nanakmatta and Goindwal.

== See also ==
- Dak bungalow, the resthouses of the British Raj
- Kasthamandap
- Singha Sattal
- Dharmasala, related structure found in Cambodia
- Sarai (building)
