= List of monuments in Hanuman Dhoka, Kathmandu =

Kathmandu Hanuman Dhoka Palace (KHP) also known as Basantapur Durbar Square is an ancient palace in Kathmandu. There are numerous monuments in the square. Some of the monuments in this area are listed as world heritage sites of the UNESCO. The monument list below is populated using the authentic information at Department of Archaeology.

== List of Monuments ==
ID	Name	Type	Location	District	Coordinates	Image
NP-KHP-01	Kasthamandap		Kathmandu Durbar Square	Kathmandu	27°42′14″N 85°18′21″E	Kasthamandap Upload Photo
NP-KHP-02	Kabindrapur		Kathmandu Hanumandhoka Palace Area	Kathmandu		Kabindrapur Upload Photo
NP-KHP-03	Shiva Temple		Kathmandu Durbar Square	Kathmandu	27°42′14″N 85°18′22″E	Shiva Temple Upload Photo
NP-KHP-04	Ashok Vianayak Temple		Kathmandu Durbar Square	Kathmandu	27°42′14″N 85°18′14″E	Ashok Vianayak Temple Upload Photo
NP-KHP-05	Garudh		Kathmandu Hanumandhoka Palace Area	Kathmandu		Garudh Upload Photo
NP-KHP-06	Trailokya Mohan		Kathmandu Durbar Square	Kathmandu	27°42′14″N 85°18′15″E	Trailokya Mohan Upload Photo
NP-KHP-07	Kumari Ghar (House)		Kathmandu Durbar Square	Kathmandu	27°42′14″N 85°17′51″E	Kumari Ghar (House) Upload Photo
NP-KHP-08	Maju Dega		Kathmandu Durbar Square	Kathmandu	27°42′15″N 85°18′15″E	Maju Dega Upload Photo
NP-KHP-09	Joshi Agam house		Kathmandu Hanumandhoka Palace Area	Kathmandu		Joshi Agam house Upload Photo
NP-KHP-10	Visnhu Temple		Kathmandu Durbar Square	Kathmandu	27°42′15″N 85°17′51″E	Visnhu Temple Upload Photo
NP-KHP-11	Shiva parwati (Navayogini) Temple		Kathmandu Hanumandhoka Palace Area	Kathmandu	27°42′15″N 85°18′23″E	Shiva parwati (Navayogini) Temple Upload Photo
NP-KHP-12	Big Bell		Kathmandu Durbar Square	Kathmandu	27°42′16″N 85°18′24″E	Big Bell Upload Photo
NP-KHP-13	Krishna Temple		Kathmandu Hanumandhoka Palace Area	Kathmandu		Krishna Temple Upload Photo
NP-KHP-14	Big Drum		Kathmandu Hanumandhoka Palace Area	Kathmandu		Big Drum Upload Photo
NP-KHP-15	Makhan Mahadev Temple		Kathmandu Hanumandhoka Palace Area	Kathmandu	27°42′18″N 85°18′27″E	Makhan Mahadev Temple Upload Photo
NP-KHP-16	Jagannath Temple		Kathmandu Durbar Square	Kathmandu	27°42′17″N 85°18′18″E	Jagannath Temple Upload Photo
NP-KHP-17	Gopinath Krishna Temple		Kathmandu Hanumandhoka Palace Area	Kathmandu		Gopinath Krishna Temple Upload Photo
NP-KHP-18	Indrapur		Kathmandu Hanumandhoka Palace Area	Kathmandu		Upload Photo Upload Photo
NP-KHP-19	Hanuman Dhoka Palace		Kathmandu Durbar Square	Kathmandu	27°42′15″N 85°18′19″E	Hanuman Dhoka Palace Upload Photo
NP-KHP-20	Talaju Temple		Kathmandu Durbar Square	Kathmandu	27°42′18″N 85°18′21″E	Talaju Temple Upload Photo
NP-KHP-21	Shingha Dhoka		Kathmandu Durbar Square	Kathmandu	27°42′17″N 85°18′18″E	Shingha Dhoka Upload Photo
NP-KHP-22	Sundari Chwok		Kathmandu Durbar Square	Kathmandu	27°42′17″N 85°18′19″E	Upload Photo Upload Photo
NP-KHP-23	Trishul Chwok		Kathmandu Hanumandhoka Palace Area	Kathmandu		Upload Photo Upload Photo
NP-KHP-24	Nasalchwok		Kathmandu Durbar Square	Kathmandu	27°42′15″N 85°18′19″E	Nasalchwok Upload Photo
NP-KHP-25	Bhandarkhal		Kathmandu Durbar Square	Kathmandu	27°42′20″N 85°18′17″E	Upload Photo Upload Photo
NP-KHP-26	Mohanchwok		Kathmandu Hanumandhoka Palace Area	Kathmandu		Upload Photo Upload Photo
NP-KHP-27	Nagpokhari		Kathmandu Hanumandhoka Palace Area	Kathmandu		Upload Photo Upload Photo
NP-KHP-28	Mulchwok		Kathmandu Durbar Square	Kathmandu	27°42′16″N 85°18′27″E	Mulchwok Upload Photo
NP-KHP-29	Narshing Murthi		Kathmandu Hanumandhoka Palace Area	Kathmandu		Upload Photo Upload Photo
NP-KHP-30	Agmchhen Temple		Kathmandu Hanumandhoka Palace Area	Kathmandu		Agmchhen Temple Upload Photo
NP-KHP-31	Dakhchwok		Kathmandu Hanumandhoka Palace Area	Kathmandu		Dakhchwok Upload Photo
NP-KHP-32	Nhlchhechwok		Kathmandu Hanumandhoka Palace Area	Kathmandu		Upload Photo Upload Photo
NP-KHP-33	Lamchwok		Kathmandu Hanumandhoka Palace Area	Kathmandu		Upload Photo Upload Photo
NP-KHP-34	Basantapur Chwok		Kathmandu Durbar Square	Kathmandu	27°42′14″N 85°18′24″E	Basantapur Chwok Upload Photo
NP-KHP-35	Kanheholchwok		Kathmandu Hanumandhoka Palace Area	Kathmandu		Kanheholchwok Upload Photo
NP-KHP-36	Dashainghar		Kathmandu Hanumandhoka Palace Area	Kathmandu		Upload Photo Upload Photo
NP-KHP-37	Panchamukhi Hanuman Statue		Kathmandu Hanumandhoka Palace Area	Kathmandu		Upload Photo Upload Photo
NP-KHP-38	Hanuman Temple		Kathmandu Durbar Square	Kathmandu	27°42′16″N 85°18′27″E	Hanuman Temple Upload Photo
NP-KHP-39	Sweta Bhairav		Kathmandu Durbar Square	Kathmandu	27°42′16″N 85°18′27″E	Sweta Bhairav Upload Photo
NP-KHP-40	Degutale Temple		Kathmandu Hanumandhoka Palace Area	Kathmandu		Degutale Temple Upload Photo
NP-KHP-41	Bhagawati Temple		Kathmandu Hanumandhoka Palace Area	Kathmandu		Upload Photo Upload Photo
NP-KHP-42	Jaldroni		Kathmandu Hanumandhoka Palace Area	Kathmandu		Jaldroni Upload Photo
NP-KHP-43	Atkonarayan Temple and monuments surrounding		Kathmandu Hanumandhoka Palace Area	Kathmandu		Atkonarayan Temple and monuments surrounding Upload Photo
NP-KHP-44	Chaitya and idols		Kathmandu Hanumandhoka Palace Area	Kathmandu		Upload Photo Upload Photo
NP-KHP-45	Mahendra Museum		Kathmandu Durbar Square	Kathmandu	27°42′16″N 85°18′27″E	Mahendra Museum Upload Photo
NP-KHP-46	Sattal		Kathmandu Hanumandhoka Palace Area	Kathmandu		Upload Photo Upload Photo
NP-KHP-47	Gaddhi Baithak		Kathmandu Durbar Square	Kathmandu	27°42′16″N 85°18′25″E	Gaddhi Baithak Upload Photo
NP-KHP-48	Dabali		Kathmandu Hanumandhoka Palace Area	Kathmandu		Dabali Upload Photo
NP-KHP-49	Shiva Temple		Kathmandu Hanumandhoka Palace Area	Kathmandu		Upload Photo Upload Photo
NP-KHP-50	Singha Sattal		Kathmandu Durbar Square	Kathmandu	27°42′13″N 85°18′20″E	Singha Sattal Upload Photo
NP-KHP-51	Bhagawati Temple		Kathmandu Hanumandhoka Palace Area	Kathmandu		Bhagawati Temple Upload Photo
NP-KHP-52	Laxminarayan Temple		Kathmandu Hanumandhoka Palace Area	Kathmandu		Laxminarayan Temple Upload Photo
NP-KHP-53	Shiva Temple		Kathmandu Hanumandhoka Palace Area	Kathmandu		Upload Photo Upload Photo
NP-KHP-54	Sikhamu bahal		Kathmandu Hanumandhoka Palace Area	Kathmandu		Sikhamu bahal Upload Photo
NP-KHP-55	Dabali		Kathmandu Hanumandhoka Palace Area	Kathmandu		Dabali Upload Photo
NP-KHP-56	Saraswati Temple		Kathmandu Hanumandhoka Palace Area	Kathmandu		Saraswati Temple Upload Photo
NP-KHP-57	Kaal Bhairav		Kathmandu Hanumandhoka Palace Area	Kathmandu	27°42′17″N 85°18′26″E	Kaal Bhairav Upload Photo
NP-KHP-58	Kageshwor Temple		Kathmandu Hanumandhoka Palace Area	Kathmandu		Kageshwor Temple Upload Photo
NP-KHP-59	Shiva Temple		Kathmandu Hanumandhoka Palace Area	Kathmandu		Upload Photo Upload Photo
NP-KHP-60	Kotilingeswor Temple		Kathmandu Hanumandhoka Palace Area	Kathmandu		Kotilingeswor Temple Upload Photo
NP-KHP-61	Shiva Temple		Kathmandu Hanumandhoka Palace Area	Kathmandu		Upload Photo Upload Photo
NP-KHP-62	Shiva Temple		Kathmandu Hanumandhoka Palace Area	Kathmandu		Upload Photo Upload Photo
NP-KHP-63	Ganesh Bhairav		Kathmandu Hanumandhoka Palace Area	Kathmandu		Upload Photo Upload Photo
NP-KHP-64	Umamaheshwor Temple		Kathmandu Hanumandhoka Palace Area	Kathmandu		Umamaheshwor Temple Upload Photo
NP-KHP-65	Kamadev		Kathmandu Hanumandhoka Palace Area	Kathmandu		Kamadev Upload Photo
NP-KHP-66	Guhyeshwori		Kathmandu Hanumandhoka Palace Area	Kathmandu		Guhyeshwori Upload Photo
NP-KHP-67	Laxmi Narayan Temple		Kathmandu Hanumandhoka Palace Area	Kathmandu		Upload Photo Upload Photo
NP-KHP-68	Satyanarayan Temple		Kathmandu Hanumandhoka Palace Area	Kathmandu		Satyanarayan Temple Upload Photo
NP-KHP-69	Mahabishnu Temple		Kathmandu Durbar Square	Kathmandu	27°42′16″N 85°18′26″E	Mahabishnu Temple Upload Photo
NP-KHP-70	Narayan Temple		Kathmandu Hanumandhoka Palace Area	Kathmandu		Upload Photo Upload Photo
NP-KHP-71	Tarini Devi		Kathmandu Hanumandhoka Palace Area	Kathmandu	27°42′18″N 85°18′29″E	Tarini Devi Upload Photo
NP-KHP-72	Layakbahil		Kathmandu Hanumandhoka Palace Area	Kathmandu		Layakbahil Upload Photo
NP-KHP-73	Chaitya		Kathmandu Hanumandhoka Palace Area	Kathmandu		Upload Photo Upload Photo
NP-KHP-74	Chaityas		Kathmandu Hanumandhoka Palace Area	Kathmandu		Upload Photo Upload Photo
NP-KHP-75	Chaityas		Kathmandu Hanumandhoka Palace Area	Kathmandu		Upload Photo Upload Photo
NP-KHP-76	Dyochhen		Kathmandu Hanumandhoka Palace Area	Kathmandu		Dyochhen Upload Photo
NP-KHP-77	chaitya		Kathmandu Hanumandhoka Palace Area	Kathmandu		chaitya Upload Photo
NP-KHP-78	Chaitya		Kathmandu Hanumandhoka Palace Area	Kathmandu		Upload Photo Upload Photo
NP-KHP-79	Aakash Bhairav Temple		Kathmandu Hanumandhoka Palace Area	Kathmandu	27°42′21″N 85°17′56″E	Aakash Bhairav Temple Upload Photo
NP-KHP-80	Chaitya		Kathmandu Hanumandhoka Palace Area	Kathmandu		Upload Photo Upload Photo
NP-KHP-81	Jhaldroni		Kathmandu Hanumandhoka Palace Area	Kathmandu		Upload Photo Upload Photo
NP-KHP-82	Kamdev Temple		Kathmandu Hanumandhoka Palace Area	Kathmandu	27°41′59″N 85°18′09″E	Kamdev Temple Upload Photo
NP-KHP-83	Ganesh Temple		Kathmandu Hanumandhoka Palace Area	Kathmandu		Ganesh Temple Upload Photo
NP-KHP-84	Rameshwor Temple		Kathmandu Hanumandhoka Palace Area	Kathmandu		Upload Photo Upload Photo
NP-KHP-85	Laxminarayan Temple		Kathmandu Hanumandhoka Palace Area	Kathmandu		Upload Photo Upload Photo
NP-KHP-86	Private House		Kathmandu Hanumandhoka Palace Area	Kathmandu		Upload Photo Upload Photo
NP-KHP-87	Chaitya Idol		Kathmandu Hanumandhoka Palace Area	Kathmandu		Upload Photo Upload Photo
NP-KHP-88	Sattal		Kathmandu Hanumandhoka Palace Area	Kathmandu		Upload Photo Upload Photo
NP-KHP-89	Kapaleshwor Mahadev Premises		Kathmandu Hanumandhoka Palace Area	Kathmandu		Upload Photo Upload Photo
NP-KHP-90	Ganesh Temple		Kathmandu Hanumandhoka Palace Area	Kathmandu		Ganesh Temple Upload Photo
NP-KHP-91	Jagannath Temple		Kathmandu Hanumandhoka Palace Area	Kathmandu		Upload Photo Upload Photo
NP-KHP-92	Srikrishna Balaram Rameshwor temple		Kathmandu Hanumandhoka Palace Area	Kathmandu		Srikrishna Balaram Rameshwor temple Upload Photo
NP-KHP-93	Kaliki devi temple		Kathmandu Hanumandhoka Palace Area	Kathmandu		Upload Photo Upload Photo
NP-KHP-94	Bharatlal shrestha home		Kathmandu Hanumandhoka Palace Area	Kathmandu		Upload Photo Upload Photo
NP-KHP-95	Gautam Manandhar house		Kathmandu Hanumandhoka Palace Area	Kathmandu		Upload Photo Upload Photo
NP-KHP-96	Sagar manandhar house		Kathmandu Hanumandhoka Palace Area	Kathmandu		Upload Photo Upload Photo
NP-KHP-97	Nijhi Ghar		Kathmandu Hanumandhoka Palace Area	Kathmandu		Upload Photo Upload Photo
NP-KHP-98	Nijhi Ghar		Kathmandu Hanumandhoka Palace Area	Kathmandu		Upload Photo Upload Photo
NP-KHP-99	Nijhi Ghar		Kathmandu Hanumandhoka Palace Area	Kathmandu		Upload Photo Upload Photo
NP-KHP-100	Kanteshwar Mahadev Temple		Kathmandu Hanumandhoka Palace Area	Kathmandu		Upload Photo Upload Photo
NP-KHP-101	Mahalakshmi Temple		Kathmandu Hanumandhoka Palace Area	Kathmandu		Upload Photo Upload Photo
NP-KHP-102	Purnamaya Maannadharko Ghar		Kathmandu Hanumandhoka Palace Area	Kathmandu		Upload Photo Upload Photo
NP-KHP-103	Mathuri Mannadharko Temple		Kathmandu Hanumandhoka Palace Area	Kathmandu		Upload Photo Upload Photo
NP-KHP-104	Tirtha bahadur Pradhan house		Kathmandu Hanumandhoka Palace Area	Kathmandu		Upload Photo Upload Photo
NP-KHP-105	Bichhe bahal		Kathmandu Hanumandhoka Palace Area	Kathmandu		Upload Photo Upload Photo
NP-KHP-106	Dyochhen		Kathmandu Hanumandhoka Palace Area	Kathmandu		Upload Photo Upload Photo
NP-KHP-107	Pati		Kathmandu Hanumandhoka Palace Area	Kathmandu		Upload Photo Upload Photo
NP-KHP-108	Gorakhsya bahadur pradhan house		Kathmandu Hanumandhoka Palace Area	Kathmandu		Upload Photo Upload Photo
NP-KHP-109	Nijhi Ghar		Kathmandu Hanumandhoka Palace Area	Kathmandu		Upload Photo Upload Photo
NP-KHP-110	Nijhi Ghar		Kathmandu Hanumandhoka Palace Area	Kathmandu		Upload Photo Upload Photo
NP-KHP-111	Nijhi Ghar		Kathmandu Hanumandhoka Palace Area	Kathmandu		Upload Photo Upload Photo
NP-KHP-112	Nijhi Ghar		Kathmandu Hanumandhoka Palace Area	Kathmandu		Upload Photo Upload Photo
NP-KHP-113	S Thirtarajko Ghar		Kathmandu Hanumandhoka Palace Area	Kathmandu		Upload Photo Upload Photo
NP-KHP-114	Shivalay		Kathmandu Hanumandhoka Palace Area	Kathmandu		Upload Photo Upload Photo
NP-KHP-115	Govinda das shrestha house		Kathmandu Hanumandhoka Palace Area	Kathmandu		Upload Photo Upload Photo
NP-KHP-116	Ganesh bahadur shrestha house		Kathmandu Hanumandhoka Palace Area	Kathmandu		Upload Photo Upload Photo
NP-KHP-117	Jayandra bahadur karmacharya house		Kathmandu Hanumandhoka Palace Area	Kathmandu		Upload Photo Upload Photo
NP-KHP-118	Byadhya prasad shah house		Kathmandu Hanumandhoka Palace Area	Kathmandu		Upload Photo Upload Photo

== See also ==
- List of Monuments in Kathmandu, Nepal
- List of Monuments in Nepal
