= Kalithattu (rest house) =

Structure in India

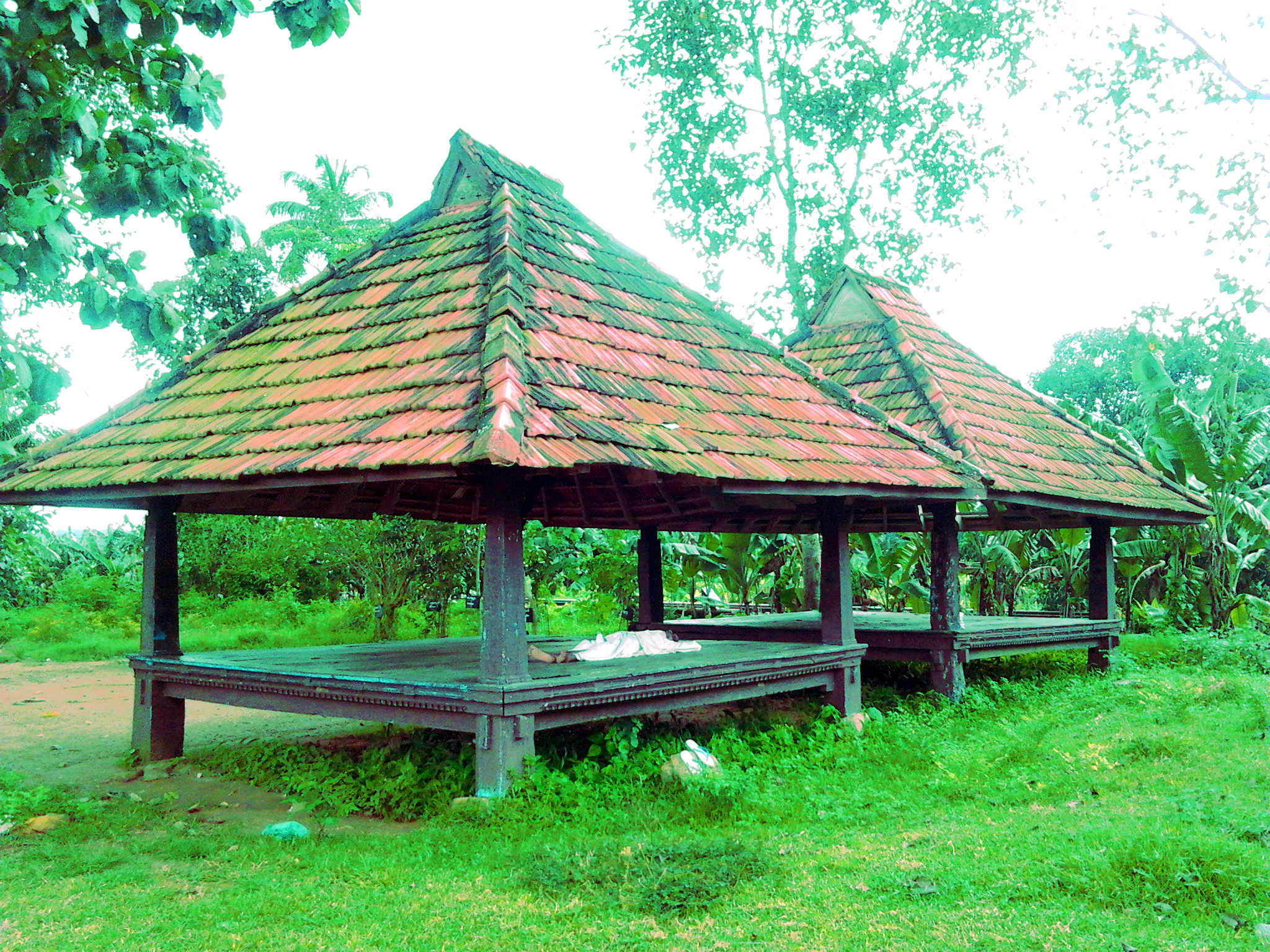
Kalithattu in Kerala.

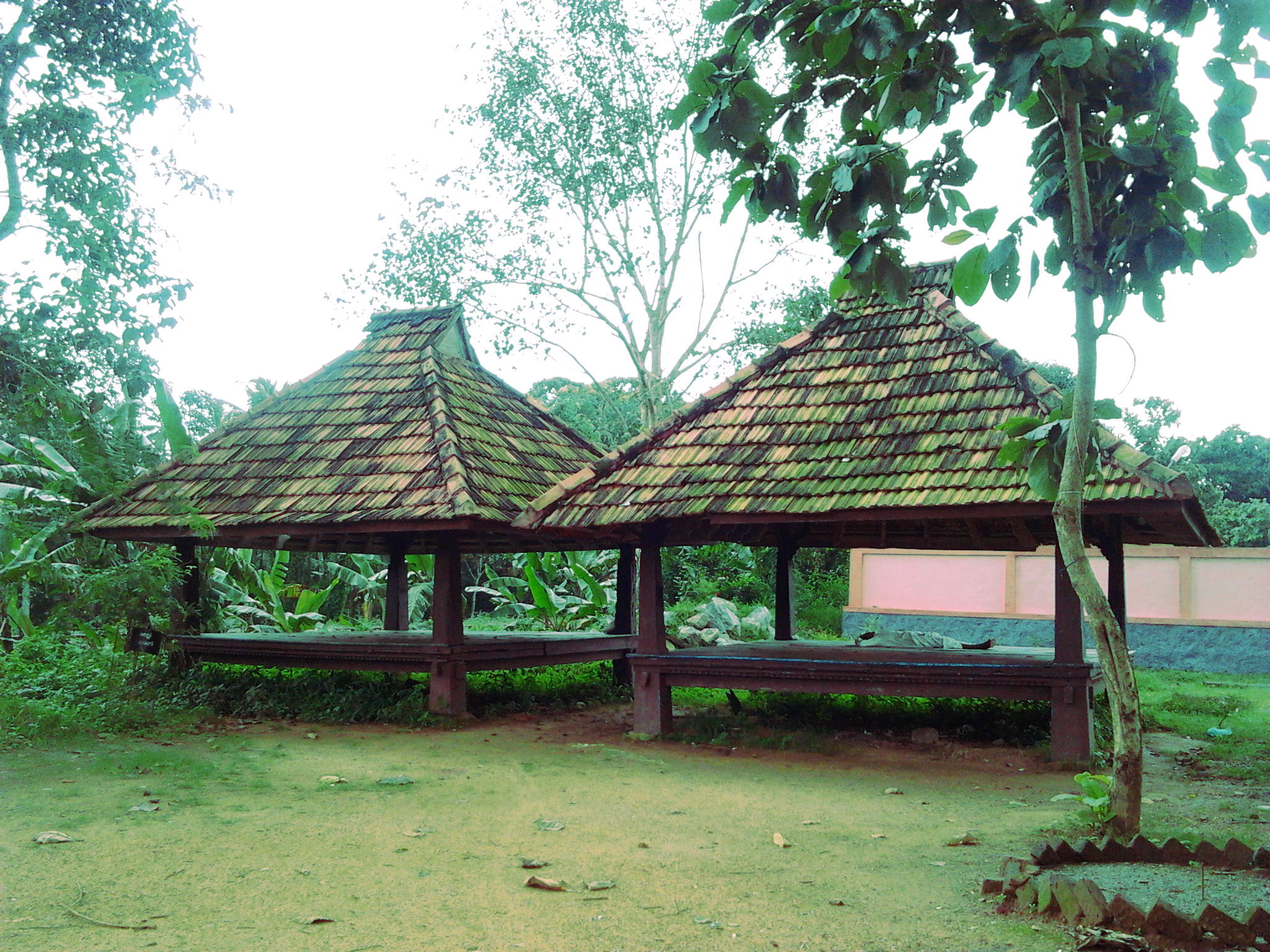
Kalithattus in Kerala

Kalithattu (Malayalam: കളിത്തട്ട്) is a type of wayside public rest house in Kerala and surrounding regions in southern India. Kalithattu are public rest-house built in villages, towns, agriculture fields and near temples for locals, pilgrims, travelers, and traders to rest. In villages, it was used by those involved in agriculture, long-distance travelers to relieve fatigue and locals to attend cultural meetings. Kalithattus are traditionally built from wood, they have wooden pillars, wooden floors and sloping roofs with two gables.

Kalithattu shares common origin with rest-houses like Ambalamas of Sri Lanka and Patis of Nepal. According to Anuradha Seneviratna and Benjamin Polk rest-houses like these were well established before 230 BC as Mauryan kings issued orders carved on stones or iron columns for planting of avenues of trees and for building shelters for the comfort of pilgrims.

== See also ==
- Ambalama
- Pati
