= Pati (rest house) =

Shelter for travellers or locals in Nepal

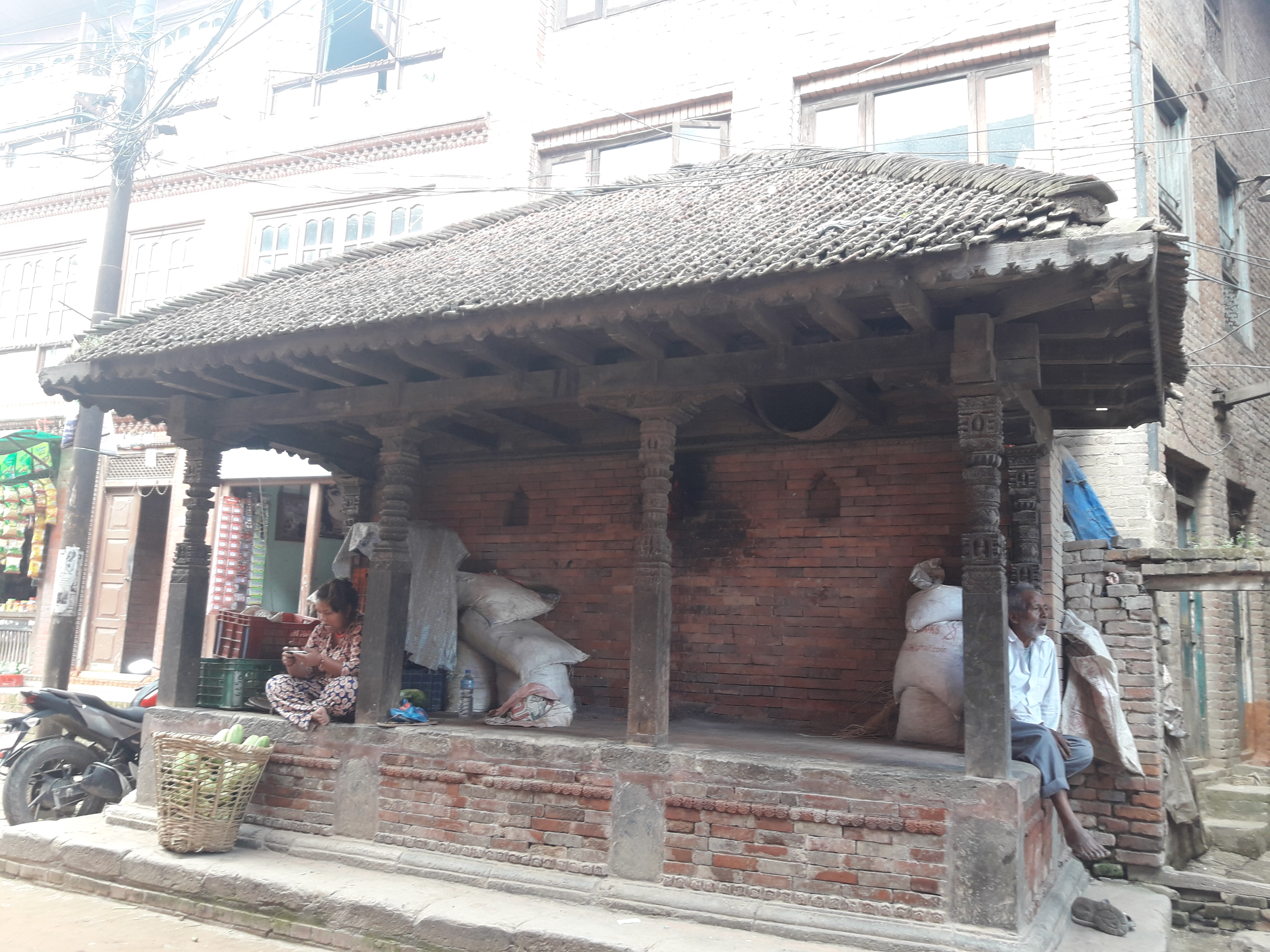
Pati rest-house in Nepal.

Pati (Nepali: पति), also called Sattal and Phalcha are a type of public rest houses in Katmandu Valley in Nepal. Patis are public rest-houses built in towns and villages for practical purposes to give shelter for pilgrims, travelers and traders. They are also used by locals as gathering space. Patis were usually built from donations by private individuals, religious groups or families. The first references to public rest houses in Nepal date back to the Lichhavi period (400 to 750 CE), but no building from this period has survived. Surviving patis today mostly date to late Malla period and Gorkha Kingdom.

== See also ==
- Ambalama
- Kalithattu
