= Singha Sattal =

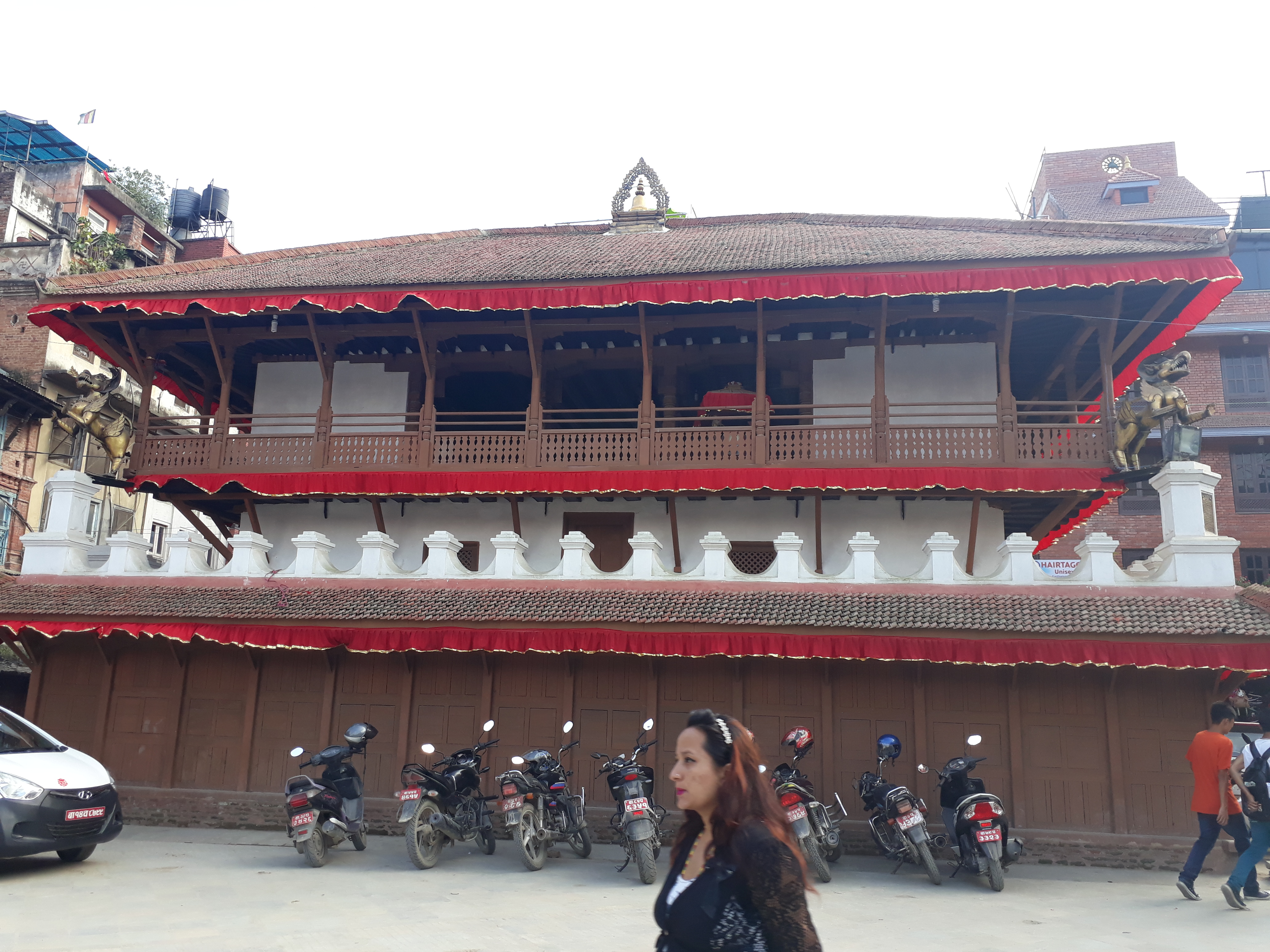
- Restored Singha Sattal after the 2015 earthquake

- Location within Bagmati Province Location within Nepal

Religion
- Affiliation: Hinduism
- District: Kathmandu
- Province: Bagmati

Location
- Location: Kathmandu Durbar Square
- Country: Nepal
- Coordinates: 27.703772693606396°N 85.3059615545782°E

Architecture
- Completed: 13th-century

Singha Sattal, also known as Silyan Sattal, is a 13th-century shelter located in the Kathmandu Durbar Square and It was built alongside the iconic Kasthamandap. Singha Sattal is owned by Guthi Sansthan, a state-owned enterprise. In the corners of the shelter, there are four bronze lions.
