= Maju Dega =

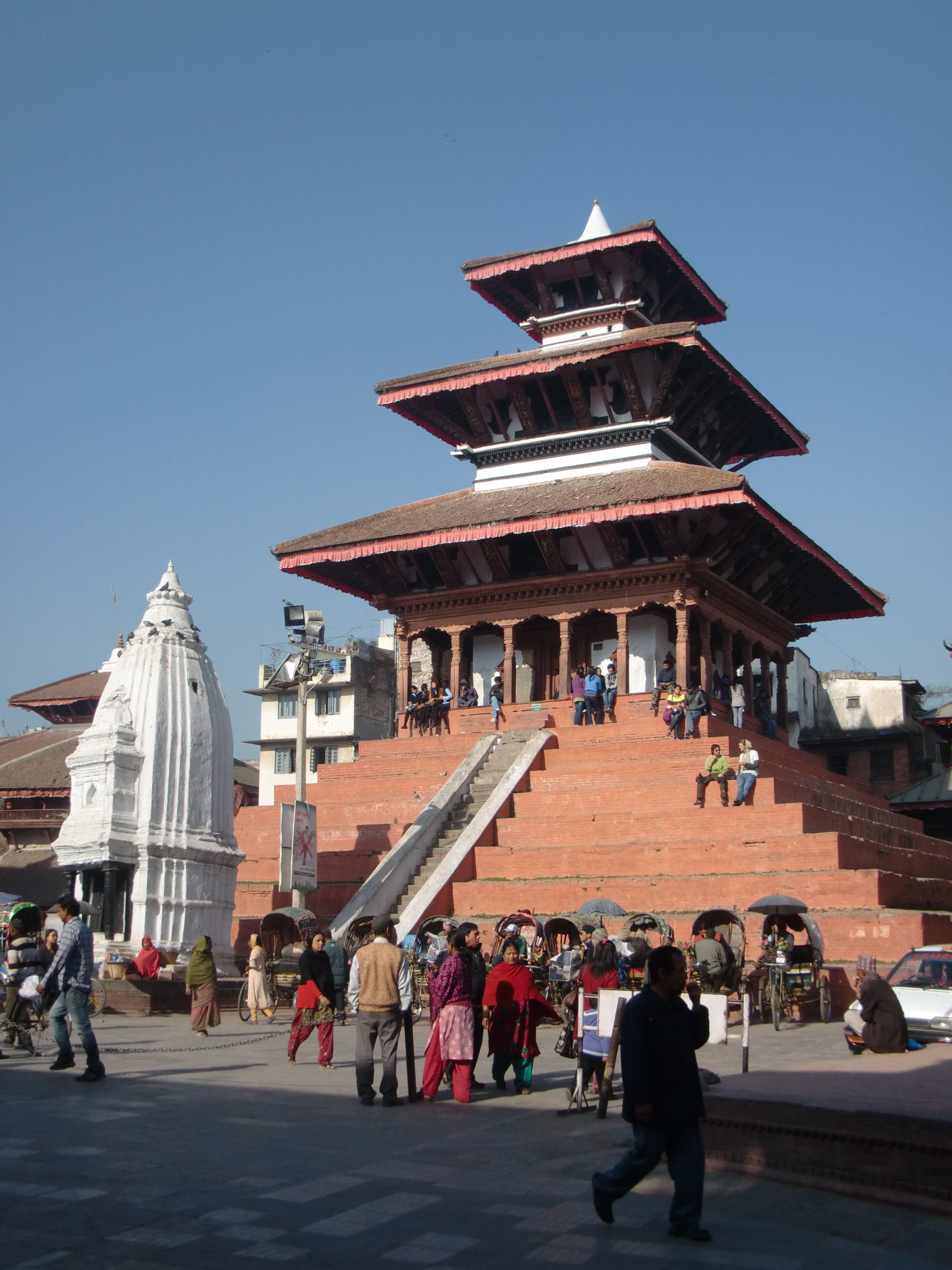
- Maju Dega in 2012

- Location within Bagmati Province Location within Nepal

Religion
- Affiliation: Hinduism
- District: Kathmandu District
- Province: Bagmati Province

Location
- Location: Kathmandu Durbar Square
- Country: Nepal
- Coordinates: 27.704269627380505°N 85.30618376650536°E

Architecture
- Creator: Riddhi Lakshmi Rajesvari Devi
- Established: 1692

Maju Dega is a Hindu temple dedicated to Shiva and it is located in Kathmandu Durbar Square, Nepal.

The temple was built by Riddhi Lakshmi, the Queen mother of Bhupetendra Malla in 1692. 1971 Indian film Haré Rama Haré Krishna was filmed on premises of the temple. The April 2015 Nepal earthquake completely destroyed the temple and it was being rebuilt in 2018.

== Gallery ==
Maju Dega temple in 1988

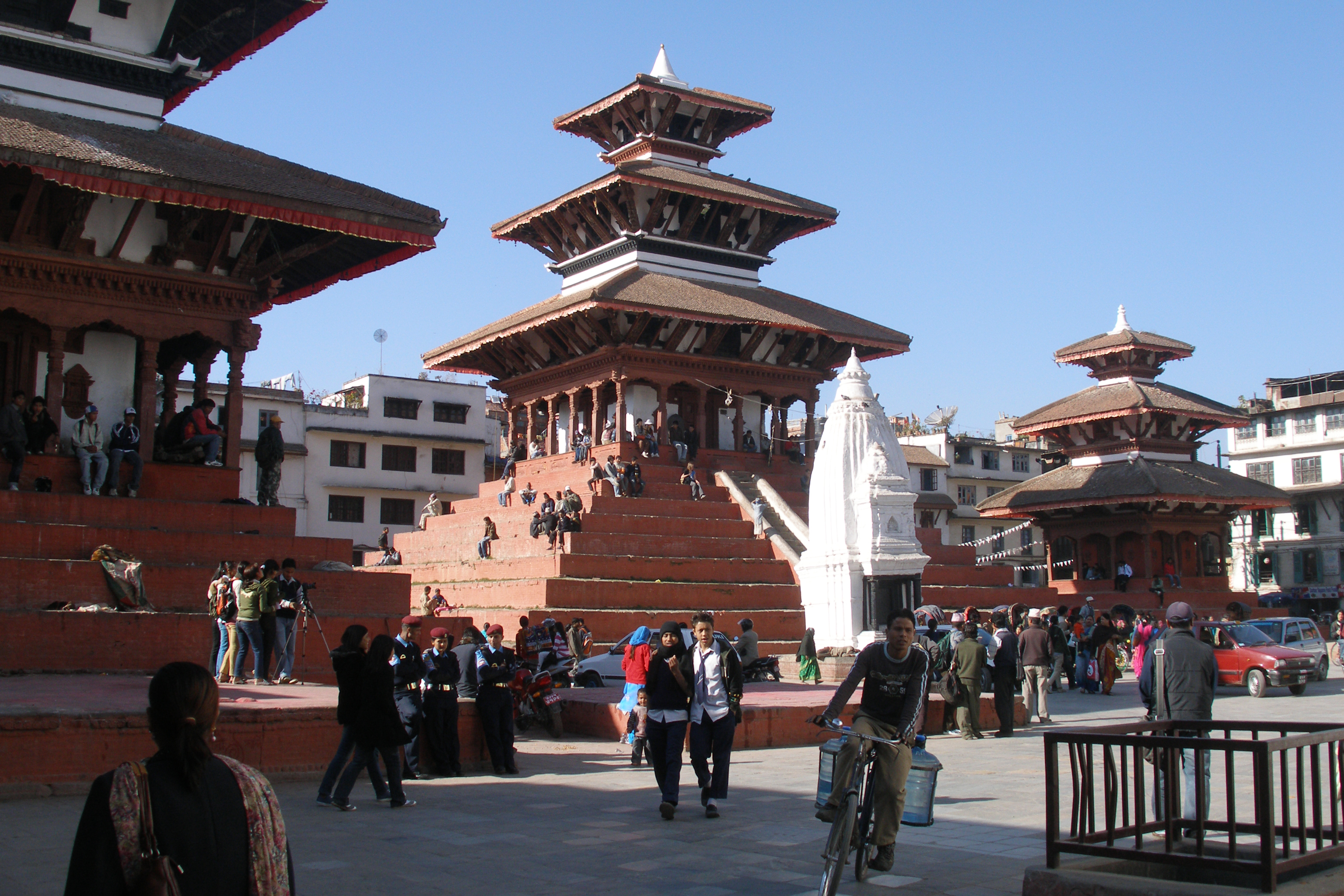
Maju Dega in 2007, prior to the 2015 earthquake

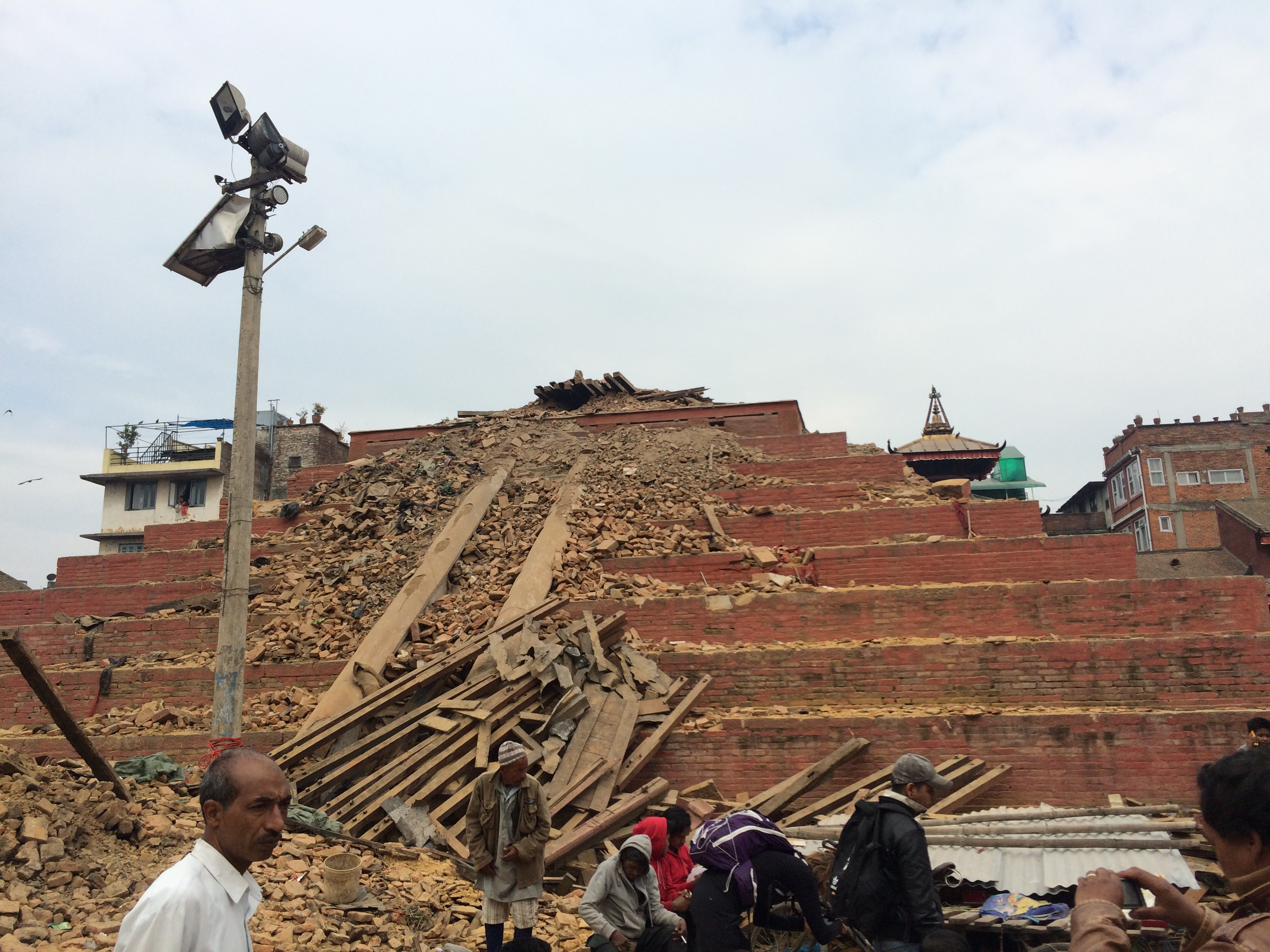
Destroyed Maju Dega in 2015

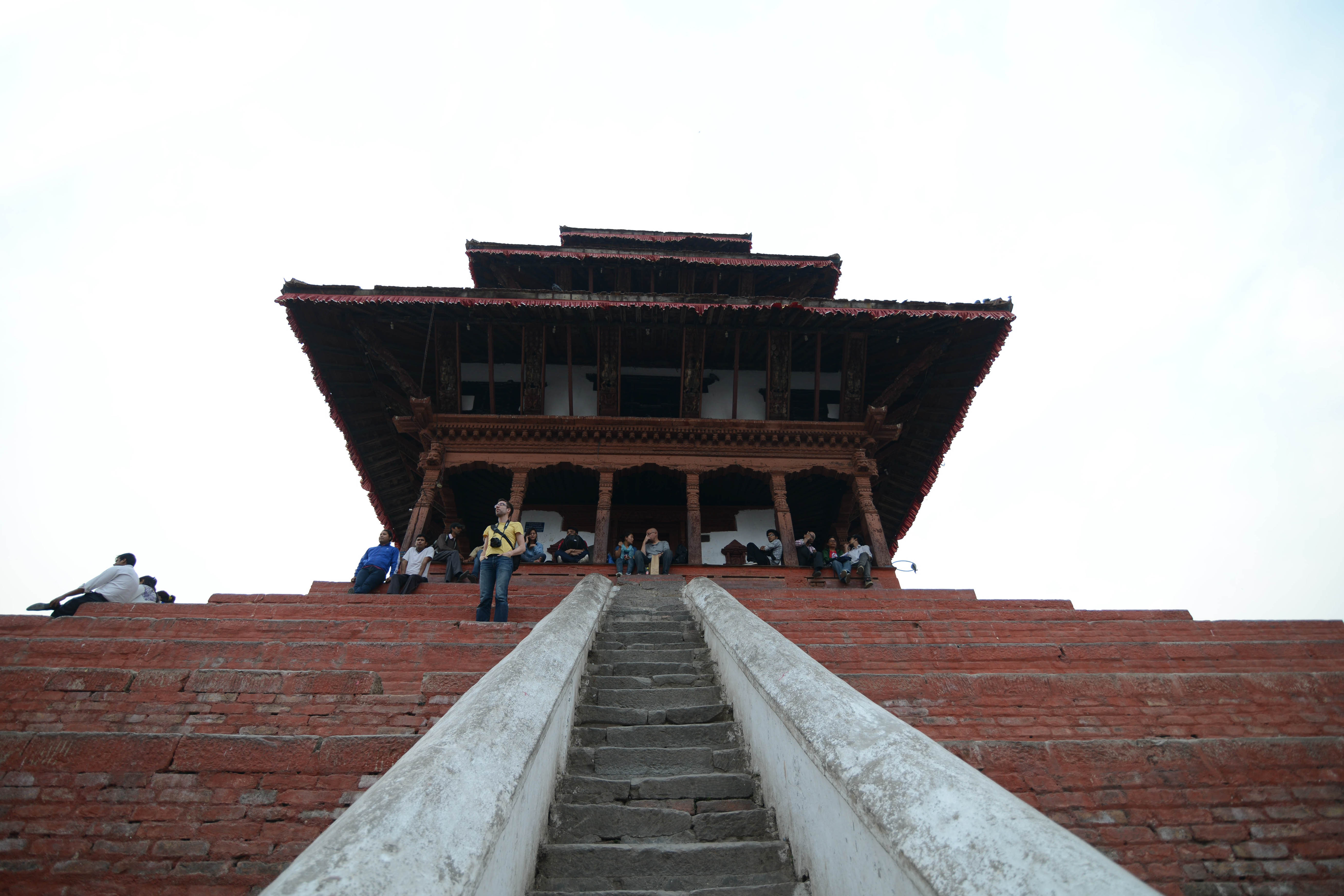
Stairs of the Maju Dega

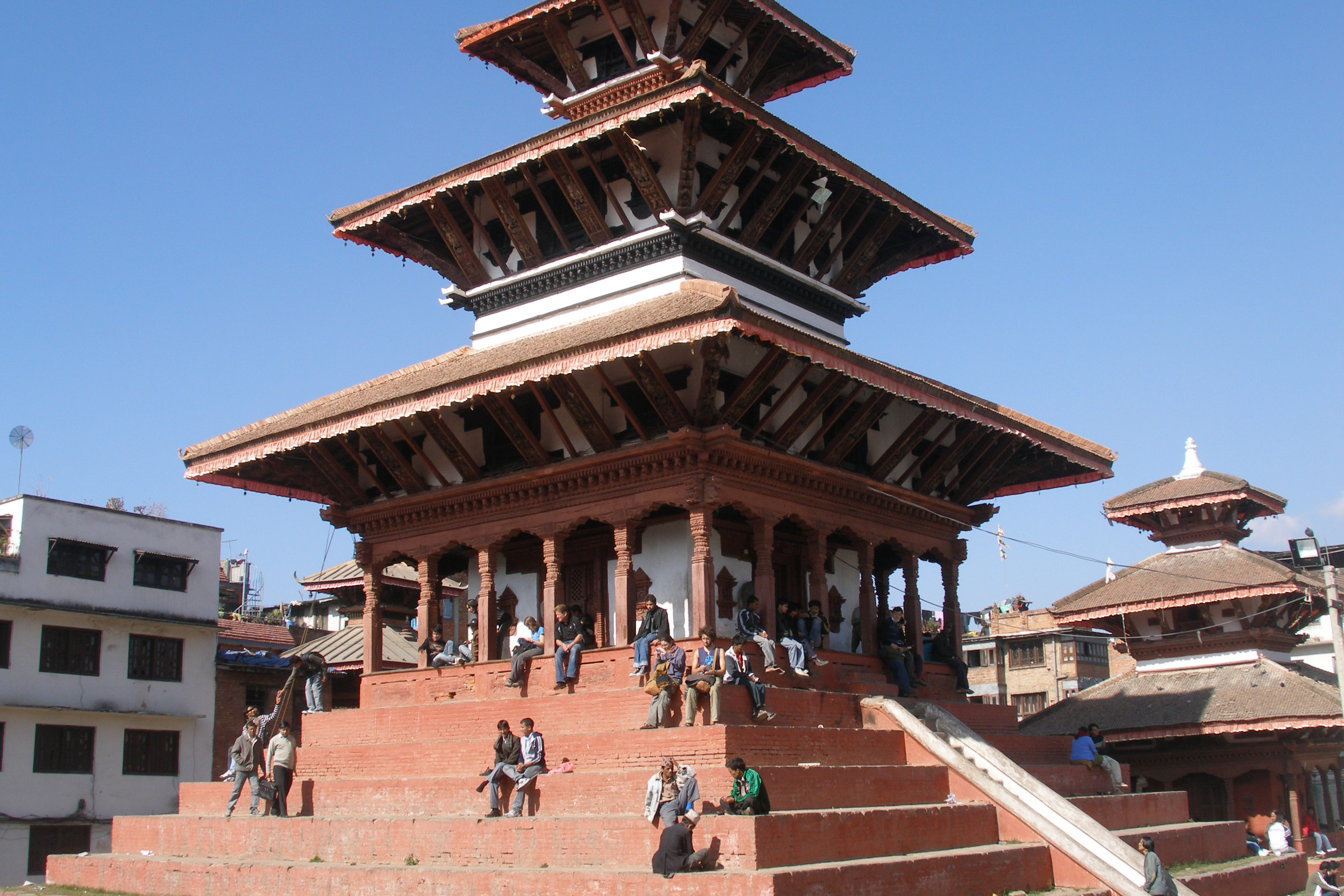
