= Kasthamandap =

Reconstructed historical building in Nepal

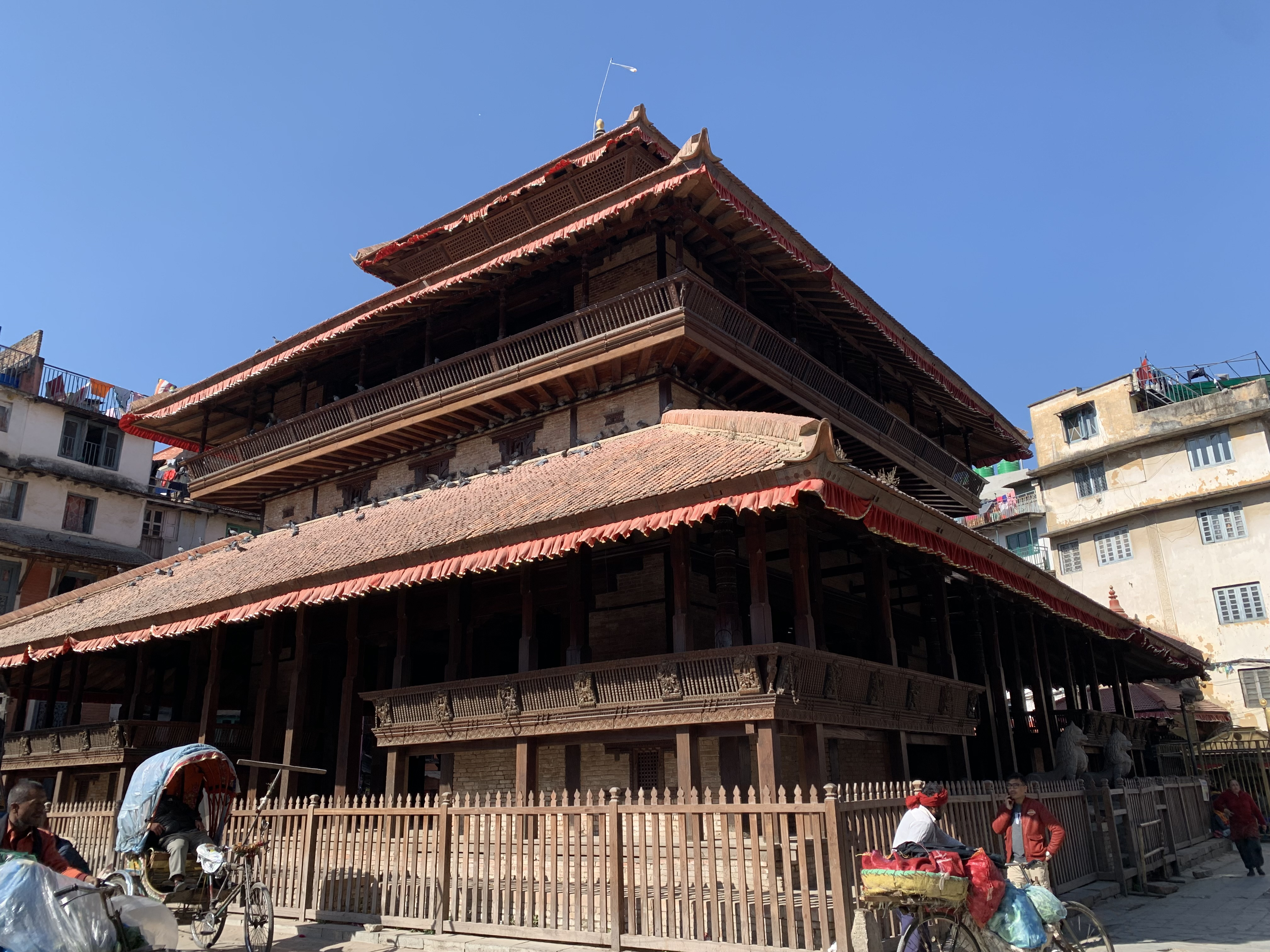
- Front view of Kasthamandap, 2023

- Location within Kathmandu

Religion
- Affiliation: Hinduism
- District: Kathmandu

Location
- Location: Kathmandu
- State: Bagmati
- Country: Nepal
- Interactive map of Kasthamandap
- Coordinates: 27.70400°N 85.30583°E

Architecture
- Type: Pagoda

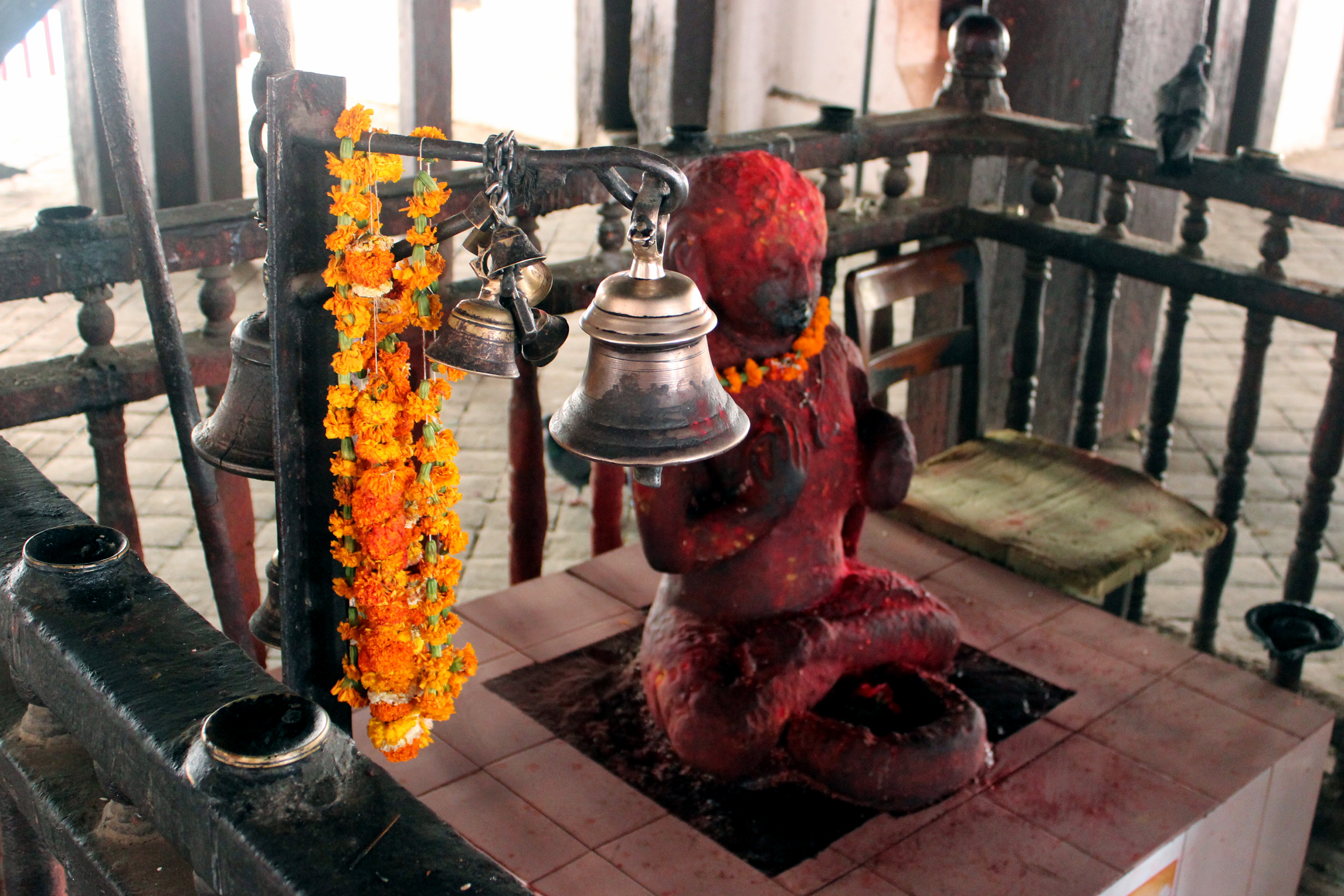
Gorakshanath shrine inside the Kasthamandap

Kasthamandap (Sanskrit: काष्ठमण्डप, Nepal Bhasa:मरु सत: Maru Satta:; literally "Wood-Covered Shelter") is a reconstructed temple and public shelter in Nepal, in Kathmandu Durbar Square. The original three-story wooden structure, with sections dated to the 7th century CE, was destroyed in the April 2015 Nepal earthquake along with many other culturally significant structures in the historic square.

Archaeological findings since the 2015 earthquake indicate that the oldest features of Kasthamandap were built during the Lichhavi era (450–750 CE). A shrine inside the Kasthamandap was added later, consecrated to the 11th-century yogi and Hindu saint Gorakshanath.

== 2015 Nepal earthquake and subsequent excavations ==
On 25 April 2015, Kasthamandap and many other buildings in the Kathmandu Durbar Square collapsed in the April 2015 Nepal earthquake, which had an estimated magnitude of 7.9 (M_{w}).

In the earthquake's aftermath, the Nepalese Department of Archaeology (DoA) began excavating the site, with the aid of UK institutions Durham University and the University of Stirling. DoA and Durham teams found coal and sand in the foundation soils. The soils were then sent to Stirling for radiocarbon dating and optically stimulated luminescence (OSL) tests, the results of which indicate that the Kasthamandap was built in the 7th century CE.

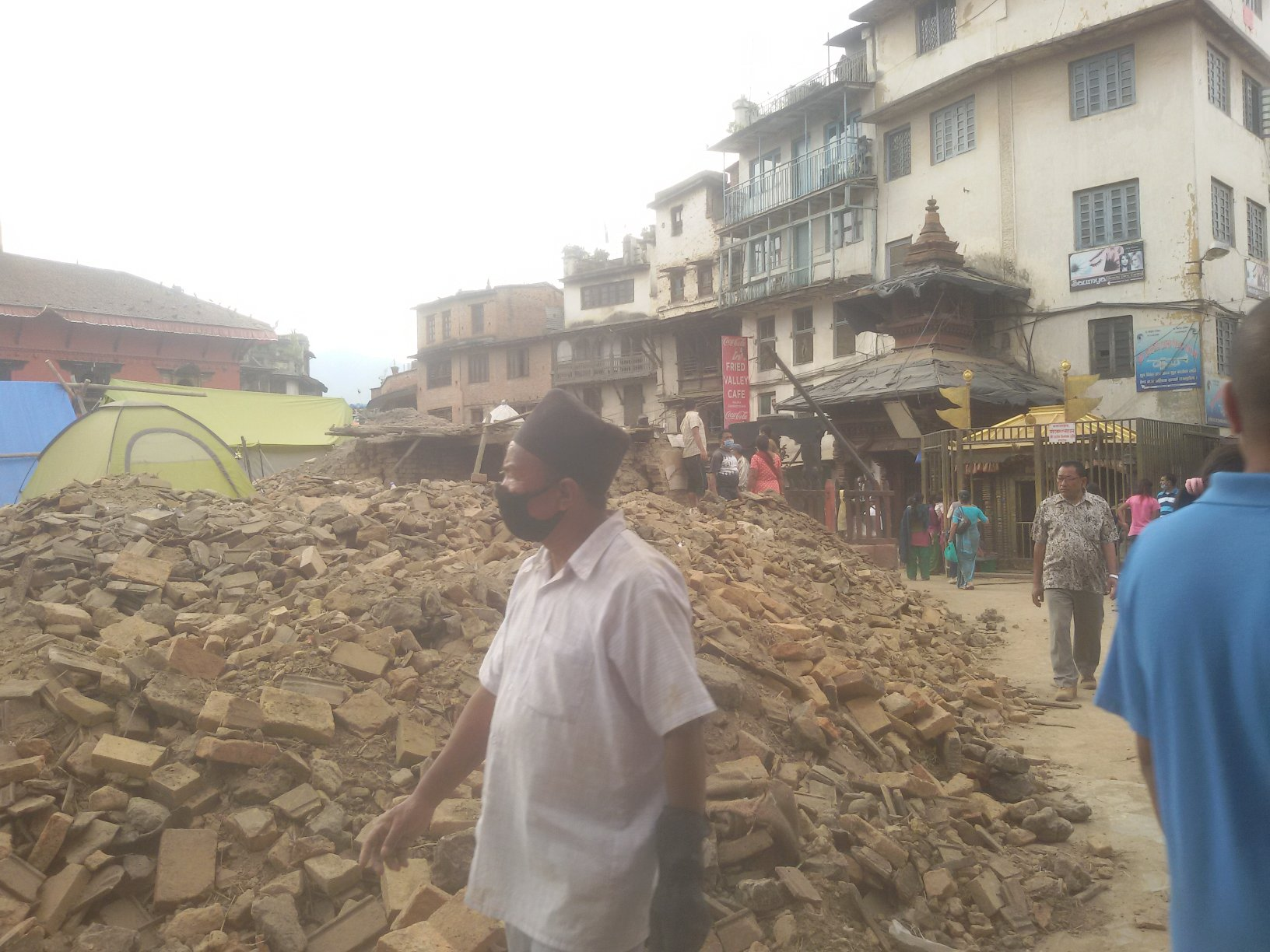
Kasthamandap premises after earthquake in April 2015

Copper plate inscriptions which mention the 14th-century king Jayasthithi Malla were recovered from a pillar in the Kasthamandap. Manuscripts dated Nepal Sambat 499, 454, and 543 (1288, 1243, and 1332 CE) contain regulations for the Pachali Bhairav Jatra festival.
