= List of monuments in Lalitpur, Nepal =

This is a list of monuments in Lalitpur District, Nepal as officially recognized by and available through the website of the Department of Archaeology, Nepal.

Patan Durbar Square also known as Lalitpur Durbar Square, in the city of Lalitpur, is an ancient palace in Kathmandu Valley. There are numerous monuments in the square. The palace square is listed as world heritage sites by the UNESCO.

== List of monuments ==
ID	Name	Type	Location	District	Coordinates	Image
NP-LP-01	Patan Durbar		Lalitpur Sub-Metropolis	Lalitpur		Patan Durbar Upload Photo
NP-LP-02	Sundari Chwok		Lalitpur Sub-Metropolis	Lalitpur	27°40′22″N 85°19′28″E	Sundari Chwok Upload Photo
NP-LP-03	Mul Chowk		Lalitpur Sub-Metropolis	Lalitpur	27°40′23″N 85°19′28″E	Mul Chowk Upload Photo
NP-LP-04	Keshawnarayan Chowk		Lalitpur Sub-Metropolis	Lalitpur		Keshawnarayan Chowk Upload Photo
NP-LP-05	Taleju Aagchey		Lalitpur Sub-Metropolis	Lalitpur	27°40′23″N 85°19′29″E	Taleju Aagchey Upload Photo
NP-LP-06	Takeju Temple		Lalitpur Sub-Metropolis	Lalitpur		Takeju Temple Upload Photo
NP-LP-07	Degu Taleju Patan		Lalitpur Sub-Metropolis	Lalitpur		Degu Taleju Patan Upload Photo
NP-LP-08	Bahadur Shah Baithak Bhawan		Lalitpur Sub-Metropolis	Lalitpur		Bahadur Shah Baithak Bhawan Upload Photo
NP-LP-09	Southeast Longe of Patan Durbar		Lalitpur Sub-Metropolis	Lalitpur		Southeast Longe of Patan Durbar Upload Photo
NP-LP-10	Lo Hiti		Lalitpur Sub-Metropolis	Lalitpur		Upload Photo Upload Photo
NP-LP-11	Tusa hiti		Lalitpur Sub-Metropolis	Lalitpur	27°40′22″N 85°19′28″E	Tusa hiti Upload Photo
NP-LP-12	Bhandarkhal Garden		Lalitpur Sub-Metropolis	Lalitpur		Bhandarkhal Garden Upload Photo
NP-LP-13	Kotpati		Lalitpur Sub-Metropolis	Lalitpur		Upload Photo Upload Photo
NP-LP-14	Narayan Temple		Lalitpur Sub-Metropolis	Lalitpur		Narayan Temple Upload Photo
NP-LP-15	Patan Krishna Temple		Lalitpur Sub-Metropolis	Lalitpur		Patan Krishna Temple Upload Photo
NP-LP-16	Chyasaldewal (Krishna Temple)		Lalitpur Sub-Metropolis	Lalitpur		Chyasaldewal (Krishna Temple) Upload Photo
NP-LP-17	Harisankar Temple		Lalitpur Sub-Metropolis	Lalitpur		Harisankar Temple Upload Photo
NP-LP-18	char Narayan		Lalitpur Sub-Metropolis	Lalitpur		char Narayan Upload Photo
NP-LP-19	Ganesh Temple		Lalitpur Sub-Metropolis	Lalitpur		Ganesh Temple Upload Photo
NP-LP-20	Maniganesh Temple		Lalitpur Sub-Metropolis	Lalitpur		Maniganesh Temple Upload Photo
NP-LP-21	Bhimsen Temple		Lalitpur Sub-Metropolis	Lalitpur		Bhimsen Temple Upload Photo
NP-LP-22	Biswanath Temple		Lalitpur Sub-Metropolis	Lalitpur		Biswanath Temple Upload Photo
NP-LP-23	Ibabahi (Rajshree Mahavihara		Lalitpur Sub-Metropolis	Lalitpur		Upload Photo Upload Photo
NP-LP-24	Mangahiti		Lalitpur Sub-Metropolis	Lalitpur		Mangahiti Upload Photo
NP-LP-25	Misha Hiti		Lalitpur Sub-Metropolis	Lalitpur		Misha Hiti Upload Photo
NP-LP-26	Kumbheshwar Temple (Mahadev)		Lalitpur Sub-Metropolis	Lalitpur		Kumbheshwar Temple (Mahadev) Upload Photo
NP-LP-27	Hirnyvarn Mahavihara (Kwavha)		Lalitpur Sub-Metropolis	Lalitpur		Hirnyvarn Mahavihara (Kwavha) Upload Photo
NP-LP-28	Harisankar Temple		Lalitpur Sub-Metropolis	Lalitpur		Harisankar Temple Upload Photo
NP-LP-29	Ganesh Temple		Lalitpur Sub-Metropolis	Lalitpur		Upload Photo Upload Photo
NP-LP-30	Kontihiti		Lalitpur Sub-Metropolis	Lalitpur		Kontihiti Upload Photo
NP-LP-31	Michu Waah		Lalitpur Sub-Metropolis	Lalitpur		Upload Photo Upload Photo
NP-LP-32	Bhairav Temple		Lalitpur Sub-Metropolis	Lalitpur		Upload Photo Upload Photo
NP-LP-33	Ganesh Temple		Lalitpur Sub-Metropolis	Lalitpur		Ganesh Temple Upload Photo
NP-LP-34	Uma Maheshwar		Lalitpur Sub-Metropolis	Lalitpur		Uma Maheshwar Upload Photo
NP-LP-35	Swat Narayanan		Lalitpur Sub-Metropolis	Lalitpur		Swat Narayanan Upload Photo
NP-LP-36	Gajendra Moksh Temple		Lalitpur Sub-Metropolis	Lalitpur		Gajendra Moksh Temple Upload Photo
NP-LP-37	Ganesh Temple		Lalitpur Sub-Metropolis	Lalitpur		Ganesh Temple Upload Photo
NP-LP-38	Nhayak Bahi (Sureshchandra Mahavihar)		Lalitpur Sub-Metropolis	Lalitpur		Nhayak Bahi (Sureshchandra Mahavihar) Upload Photo
NP-LP-39	Gyawa Wahi (Gyanwarna Mahavihar)		Lalitpur Sub-Metropolis	Lalitpur		Upload Photo Upload Photo
NP-LP-40	Chamunda Temple		Lalitpur Sub-Metropolis	Lalitpur		Chamunda Temple Upload Photo
NP-LP-41	Krishnamandirko Goti House		Lalitpur Sub-Metropolis	Lalitpur		Upload Photo Upload Photo
NP-LP-42	Haremakanth Rajopadhyayko House		Lalitpur Sub-Metropolis	Lalitpur		Upload Photo Upload Photo
NP-LP-43	Kamlabhakth Rajbandarikth House		Lalitpur Sub-Metropolis	Lalitpur		Upload Photo Upload Photo
NP-LP-44	Bhartaraj Nevako House		Lalitpur Sub-Metropolis	Lalitpur		Upload Photo Upload Photo
NP-LP-45	Lamopati (Thanapati)		Lalitpur Sub-Metropolis	Lalitpur		Lamopati (Thanapati) Upload Photo
NP-LP-46	Dattathray Temple		Lalitpur Sub-Metropolis	Lalitpur		Upload Photo Upload Photo
NP-LP-47	Dhungedaara		Lalitpur Sub-Metropolis	Lalitpur		Upload Photo Upload Photo
NP-LP-48	Satal (Lalit Pati)		Lalitpur Sub-Metropolis	Lalitpur		Upload Photo Upload Photo
NP-LP-49	Kopeshwar Temple		Lalitpur Sub-Metropolis	Lalitpur		Kopeshwar Temple Upload Photo
NP-LP-50	Shivalay		Lalitpur Sub-Metropolis	Lalitpur		Upload Photo Upload Photo
NP-LP-51	Thrivikram Vishnu Temple		Lalitpur Sub-Metropolis	Lalitpur		Upload Photo Upload Photo
NP-LP-52	Jaganath Temple		Lalitpur Sub-Metropolis	Lalitpur		Upload Photo Upload Photo
NP-LP-53	Ganesh Temple		Lalitpur Sub-Metropolis	Lalitpur		Ganesh Temple Upload Photo
NP-LP-54	Ardhnareshwor		Lalitpur Sub-Metropolis	Lalitpur		Upload Photo Upload Photo
NP-LP-55	Hirakaji Lakhe's house		Lalitpur Sub-Metropolis	Lalitpur		Upload Photo Upload Photo
NP-LP-56	Bhajuman chitrakar house		Lalitpur Sub-Metropolis	Lalitpur		Upload Photo Upload Photo
NP-LP-57	Sunil shakya house		Lalitpur Sub-Metropolis	Lalitpur		Upload Photo Upload Photo
NP-LP-58	Mohangopal shrestha house		Lalitpur Sub-Metropolis	Lalitpur		Upload Photo Upload Photo
NP-LP-59	Santamanshakya House		Lalitpur Sub-Metropolis	Lalitpur		Upload Photo Upload Photo
NP-LP-60	Rishiprasad Amatya House		Lalitpur Sub-Metropolis	Lalitpur		Upload Photo Upload Photo
NP-LP-61	Ramkrishna Shrestha House		Lalitpur Sub-Metropolis	Lalitpur		Upload Photo Upload Photo
NP-LP-62	Sambhu Amatya House		Lalitpur Sub-Metropolis	Lalitpur		Upload Photo Upload Photo
NP-LP-63	Siddhibhakta Rajbhandari House		Lalitpur Sub-Metropolis	Lalitpur		Upload Photo Upload Photo
NP-LP-64	Hirabajra Bajracharya House		Lalitpur Sub-Metropolis	Lalitpur		Upload Photo Upload Photo
NP-LP-65	Krishnaman Shrestha House		Lalitpur Sub-Metropolis	Lalitpur		Upload Photo Upload Photo
NP-LP-66	Asakaji Shakya House		Lalitpur Sub-Metropolis	Lalitpur		Upload Photo Upload Photo
NP-LP-67	Rajbhai Tamrakar House		Lalitpur Sub-Metropolis	Lalitpur		Upload Photo Upload Photo
NP-LP-68	Siddhilaxmi House		Lalitpur Sub-Metropolis	Lalitpur		Upload Photo Upload Photo
NP-LP-69	Rajendra Shakya House		Lalitpur Sub-Metropolis	Lalitpur		Upload Photo Upload Photo
NP-LP-70	Laxman Tamrakar House		Lalitpur Sub-Metropolis	Lalitpur		Upload Photo Upload Photo
NP-LP-71	Rajkarnikar Guthi House		Lalitpur Sub-Metropolis	Lalitpur		Upload Photo Upload Photo
NP-LP-72	Om Tamrakar House		Lalitpur Sub-Metropolis	Lalitpur		Upload Photo Upload Photo
NP-LP-73	Kiran Pradhan House		Lalitpur Sub-Metropolis	Lalitpur		Upload Photo Upload Photo
NP-LP-74	Ramesh Lakhe House		Lalitpur Sub-Metropolis	Lalitpur		Upload Photo Upload Photo
NP-LP-75	Ratyaram Shrestha House		Lalitpur Sub-Metropolis	Lalitpur		Upload Photo Upload Photo
NP-LP-76	Hiradevi Shakya House		Lalitpur Sub-Metropolis	Lalitpur		Upload Photo Upload Photo
NP-LP-77	Rajbir Karmacharya House		Lalitpur Sub-Metropolis	Lalitpur		Upload Photo Upload Photo
NP-LP-78	Surendra Puri House		Lalitpur Sub-Metropolis	Lalitpur		Upload Photo Upload Photo
NP-LP-79	Aishwarya joshi House		Lalitpur Sub-Metropolis	Lalitpur		Upload Photo Upload Photo
NP-LP-80	Lalitpur Chamber of Commerce House		Lalitpur Sub-Metropolis	Lalitpur		Lalitpur Chamber of Commerce House Upload Photo
NP-LP-81	Adarsha Saral Nimavi House		Lalitpur Sub-Metropolis	Lalitpur		Upload Photo Upload Photo
NP-LP-82	Deb shakya House		Lalitpur Sub-Metropolis	Lalitpur		Upload Photo Upload Photo
NP-LP-83	Nirmal Shakya House		Lalitpur Sub-Metropolis	Lalitpur		Upload Photo Upload Photo
NP-LP-84	Keshav Shrestha House		Lalitpur Sub-Metropolis	Lalitpur		Upload Photo Upload Photo
NP-LP-85	Hirabajra Bajracharya House		Lalitpur Sub-Metropolis	Lalitpur		Upload Photo Upload Photo
NP-LP-86	Rajbhai Tamrakar House		Lalitpur Sub-Metropolis	Lalitpur		Upload Photo Upload Photo
NP-LP-87	Kabindra Joshi House		Lalitpur Sub-Metropolis	Lalitpur		Upload Photo Upload Photo
NP-LP-88	Krishnagovinda Joshi House		Lalitpur Sub-Metropolis	Lalitpur		Upload Photo Upload Photo
NP-LP-89	Sanu Shakya House		Lalitpur Sub-Metropolis	Lalitpur		Upload Photo Upload Photo
NP-LP-90	Siddha Mahabihar		Lalitpur Sub-Metropolis	Lalitpur		Upload Photo Upload Photo
NP-LP-91	Nutan govinda joshi House		Lalitpur Sub-Metropolis	Lalitpur		Upload Photo Upload Photo
NP-LP-92	Ratnadev bajracharya House		Lalitpur Sub-Metropolis	Lalitpur		Upload Photo Upload Photo
NP-LP-93	Rudrabahadur Shrestha House		Lalitpur Sub-Metropolis	Lalitpur		Upload Photo Upload Photo
NP-LP-94	Hirakaji Shrestha House		Lalitpur Sub-Metropolis	Lalitpur		Upload Photo Upload Photo
NP-LP-95	Hridaya Raj Rajkarnikar House		Lalitpur Sub-Metropolis	Lalitpur		Upload Photo Upload Photo
NP-LP-96	Hariprasad Pradhan House		Lalitpur Sub-Metropolis	Lalitpur		Upload Photo Upload Photo
NP-LP-97	Prakash narsingh House		Lalitpur Sub-Metropolis	Lalitpur		Upload Photo Upload Photo
NP-LP-98	Purna Shrestha House		Lalitpur Sub-Metropolis	Lalitpur		Upload Photo Upload Photo
NP-LP-99	Ramesh Tamrakar House		Lalitpur Sub-Metropolis	Lalitpur		Upload Photo Upload Photo
NP-LP-100	narayan Ranjeetkar House		Lalitpur Sub-Metropolis	Lalitpur		Upload Photo Upload Photo
NP-LP-101	Dharmaraj Bajracharya House		Lalitpur Sub-Metropolis	Lalitpur		Upload Photo Upload Photo
NP-LP-102	Nhuchhe Bahadur Shakya House		Lalitpur Sub-Metropolis	Lalitpur		Upload Photo Upload Photo
NP-LP-103	Rakesh Shakya House		Lalitpur Sub-Metropolis	Lalitpur		Upload Photo Upload Photo
NP-LP-104	Pannalal Shakya House		Lalitpur Sub-Metropolis	Lalitpur		Upload Photo Upload Photo
NP-LP-105	Sahila Shrestha House		Lalitpur Sub-Metropolis	Lalitpur		Upload Photo Upload Photo
NP-LP-106	Dipankar Guthi House		Lalitpur Sub-Metropolis	Lalitpur		Upload Photo Upload Photo
NP-LP-107	Jeet Mehar House		Lalitpur Sub-Metropolis	Lalitpur		Upload Photo Upload Photo
NP-LP-108	Saptajyoti House		Lalitpur Sub-Metropolis	Lalitpur		Upload Photo Upload Photo
NP-LP-109	Laxminarayan Pradhan House		Lalitpur Sub-Metropolis	Lalitpur		Upload Photo Upload Photo
NP-LP-110	Maniklal Joshi House		Lalitpur Sub-Metropolis	Lalitpur		Upload Photo Upload Photo
NP-LP-111	Laxmi Chitrakar House		Lalitpur Sub-Metropolis	Lalitpur		Upload Photo Upload Photo
NP-LP-112	Hanuman Amatya House		Lalitpur Sub-Metropolis	Lalitpur		Upload Photo Upload Photo
NP-LP-113	Sanumaiya Manandhar House		Lalitpur Sub-Metropolis	Lalitpur		Upload Photo Upload Photo
NP-LP-114	Sukraraj Shakya House		Lalitpur Sub-Metropolis	Lalitpur		Upload Photo Upload Photo
NP-LP-115	Upendra Joshi House		Lalitpur Sub-Metropolis	Lalitpur		Upload Photo Upload Photo
NP-LP-116	Manik Jyoti Shakya House		Lalitpur Sub-Metropolis	Lalitpur		Upload Photo Upload Photo
NP-LP-117	Godawari Temple/Kunda		Lalitpur Sub-Metropolis	Lalitpur		Godawari Temple/Kunda Upload Photo
NP-LP-118	Sankhamuldham		Lalitpur Sub-Metropolis	Lalitpur		Upload Photo Upload Photo
NP-LP-119	Ashoka Stupa		Lalitpur Sub-Metropolis	Lalitpur		Ashoka Stupa Upload Photo
NP-LP-120	Sunaya Shree Mishra Yempi Mahabihar		Lalitpur Sub-Metropolis	Lalitpur		Upload Photo Upload Photo
NP-LP-121	Batuk Bhairab		Lalitpur Sub-Metropolis	Lalitpur		Batuk Bhairab Upload Photo
NP-LP-122	Balkumari Temple		Lalitpur Sub-Metropolis	Lalitpur		Upload Photo Upload Photo
NP-LP-123	Jyapu Pragya Bhavan		Lalitpur Sub-Metropolis	Lalitpur		Upload Photo Upload Photo
NP-LP-124	Nag Bahal		Lalitpur Sub-Metropolis	Lalitpur		Upload Photo Upload Photo
NP-LP-125	Shree Shakyasinha vihar		Lalitpur Sub-Metropolis	Lalitpur		Upload Photo Upload Photo
NP-LP-126	Jayasri Vihar (Jotha Baha)		Lalitpur Sub-Metropolis	Lalitpur		Upload Photo Upload Photo
NP-LP-127	Thapa Hiti		Lalitpur Sub-Metropolis	Lalitpur		Upload Photo Upload Photo
NP-LP-128	Shree Baisha Barna Mahabihar (guji baha)		Lalitpur Sub-Metropolis	Lalitpur		Upload Photo Upload Photo
NP-LP-129	Jayati Bihar (Jatibaha)		Lalitpur Sub-Metropolis	Lalitpur		Upload Photo Upload Photo
NP-LP-130	Big Bell		Lalitpur Sub-Metropolis	Lalitpur	27°40′23″N 85°19′28″E	Big Bell Upload Photo
NP-LP-131	Bhandarkhal Pokhari (Kamal Pokhari)		Lalitpur Sub-Metropolis	Lalitpur	27°40′21″N 85°19′29″E	Bhandarkhal Pokhari (Kamal Pokhari) Upload Photo

== See also ==
- List of monuments in Bagmati Province
- List of monuments in Nepal
