= Alko Hiti =

Coordinates: 27°40′42″N 85°19′32.4″E

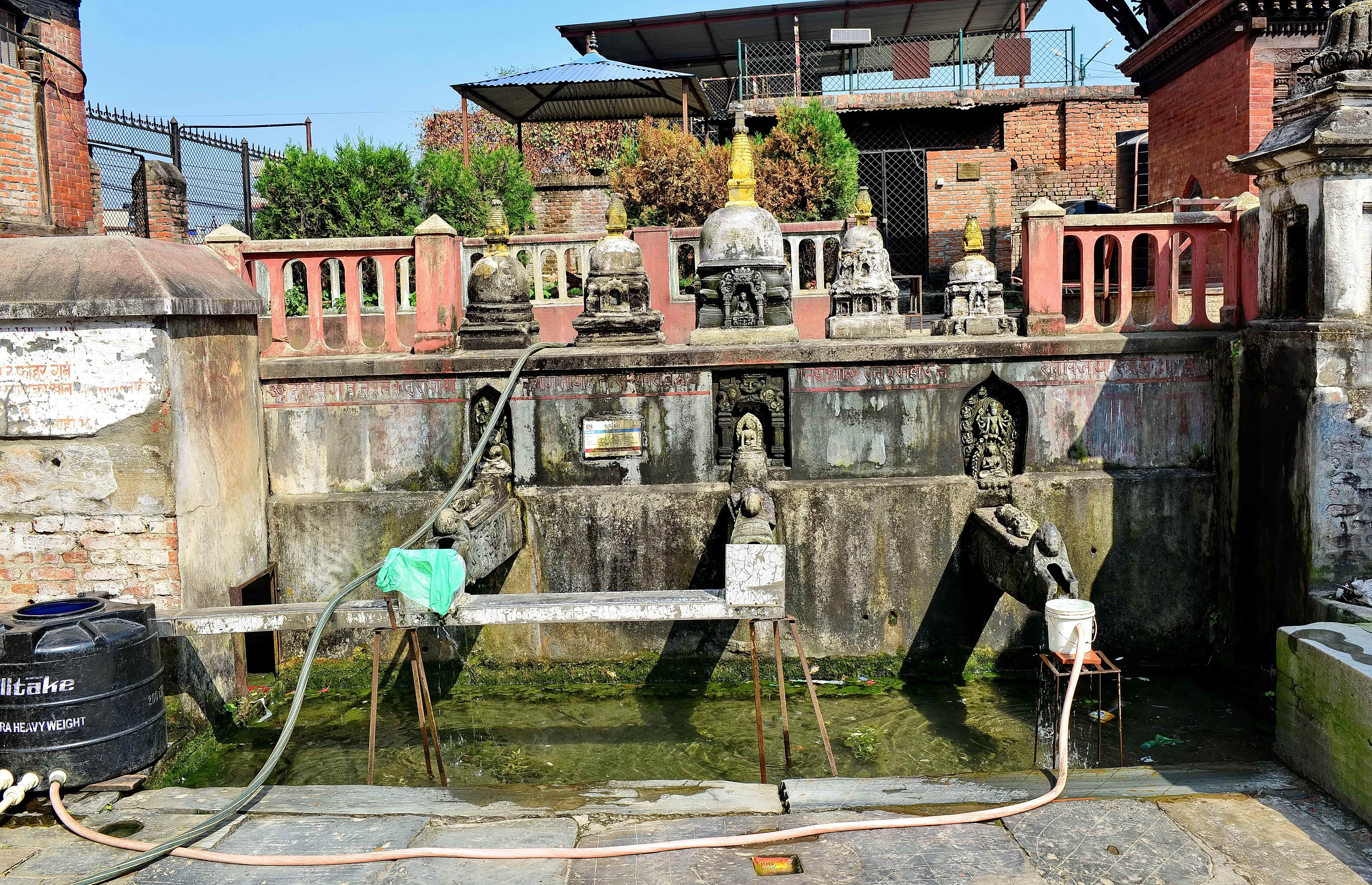
The three main spouts of Alko Hiti

Alko Hiti, also known as Alkwo Hiti, Aluko Hiti or Alok Hiti (lit. 'tall faucet') is an early 15th-century dhunge dhara (drinking fountain) in the city of Patan, Nepal. Thanks to the active involvement of the people who rely on this dhunge dhara for their drinking water, Alko Hiti has remained operational from the time it was built to the present day.

== History ==
Alko Hiti was built in 1415 AD by Tumha Dev Bajracharya, a famous Tantric Buddhist and healer, next to the north-western gate of the old city of Patan.

According to one legend Tumha Dev was visited by a snake in human form, who asked him to cure an eye disease his family was suffering from. When the medicine he gave the Nāga proved effective, he received three stones as a reward, which he kept under lock and key. When his wife found the stones, she judged them useless and threw them out. Water springs erupted in the places where the pebbles had landed on the ground. These became the three sources of the spouts of Alko Hiti.

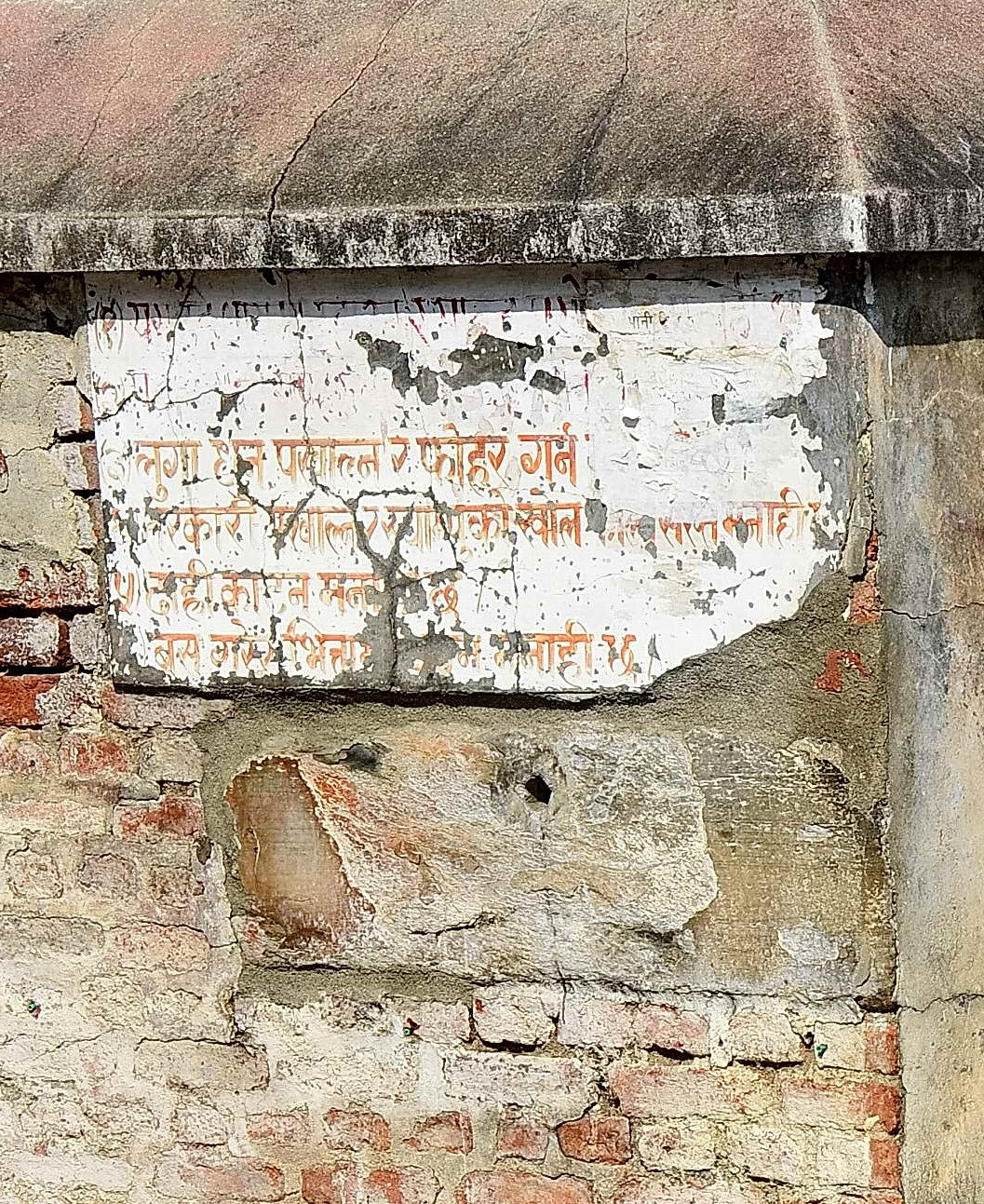
Sign describing do's and don'ts at Alko Hiti. The hole below it belongs to a tutedhara that is no longer in use

Tumha Dev Bajracharya also established some regulations to ensure its proper use and maintenance. Some parts of the dhunge dhara were never to be touched and the surrounding area had to be kept clean. Soap, wastewater, honey or litter should not be thrown there. Furthermore, menstruating women and people from low castes were not allowed entry and it was forbidden to wear leather shoes.

A copper inscription can still be found at Alko Hiti, warning users of a painful punishment, inflicted by the Nagas, for anyone who misbehaves towards the hiti.

Maintenance was in the hands of a guthi and the yield from a stretch of land, reserved especially for the purpose, provided the funds. In the early sixties major maintenance took place. This not only concerned the hiti itself, but also its surroundings. The 1963 renovation of Alko Hiti was led by the Baidya family, who claim to be descendants of one of the original donors. Routine maintenance is still done every year during Naga Panchami and Sithi Nakha.

According to local residents, maintenance of the drains used to be left to fish, toads and snakes living in the drainage pit. The fish would eat the moss growing in the pit, keeping it from getting clogged, the toads would eat the fish and the snakes would eat the toads, while sliding through the drainage channel.

== Architecture ==
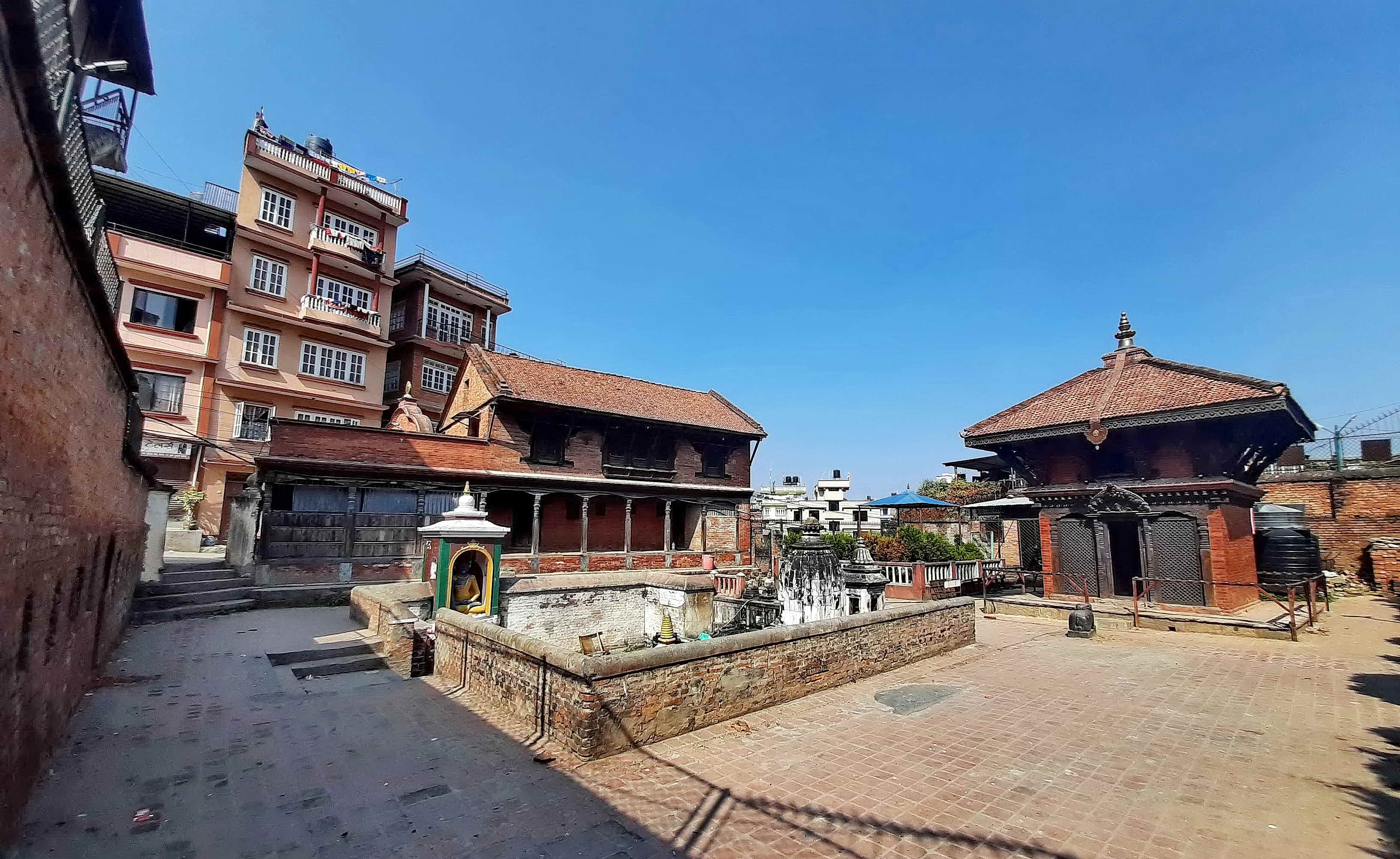
Courtyard with Alko Hiti from the south. The Buddha statue and main stairs are on the left, The Ganesha temple is on the right. The entrance gate and sattal-pati are in the background

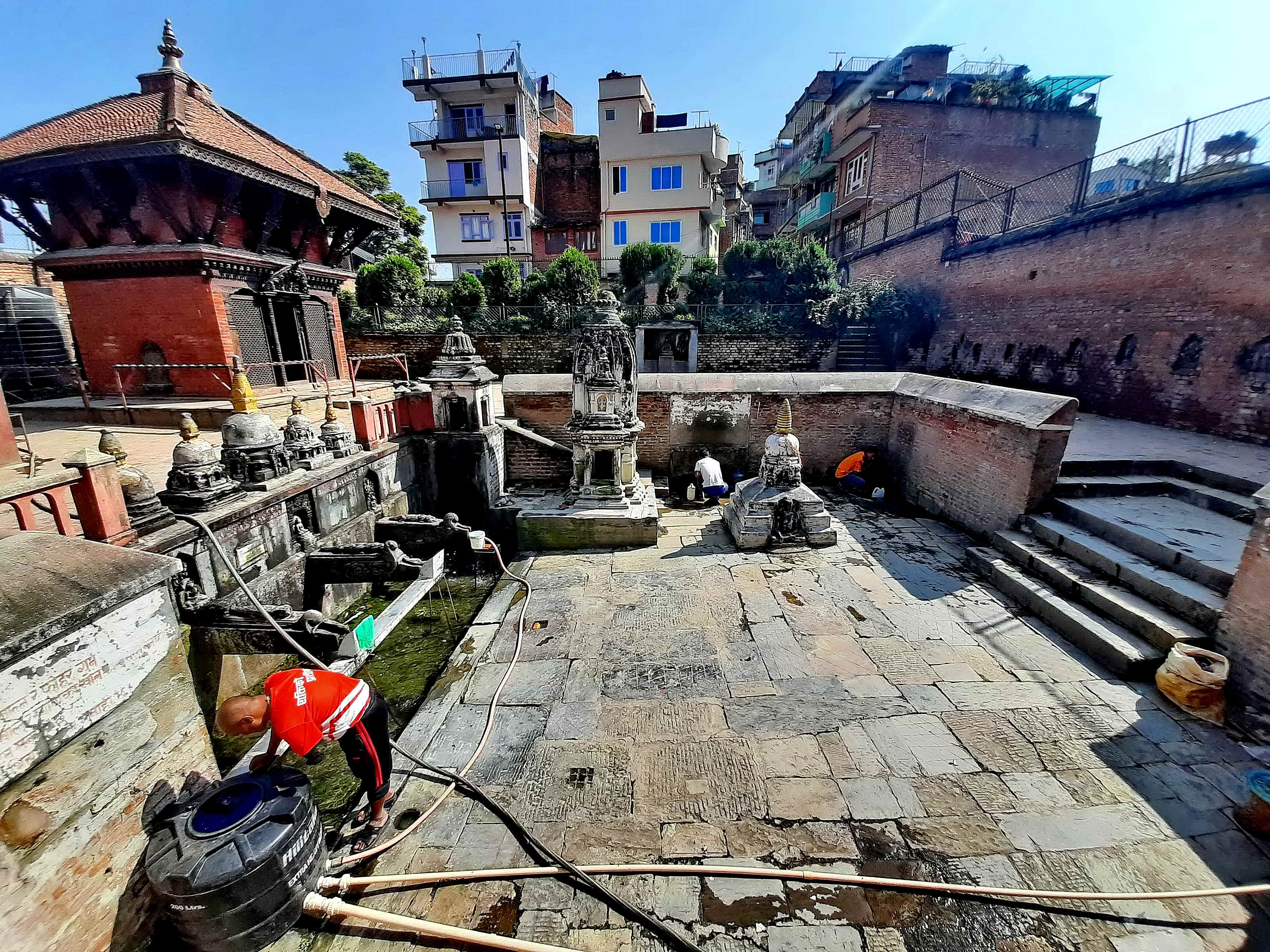
Alko Hiti viewed from the north-west. The three makara spouts are on the left, two people are crouched in front of each of the lower spouts. The main aquifer of Alko Hiti is behind the courtyard wall in the background

=== Courtyard ===
Alko Hiti can be found in a rectangular courtyard, a few steps down from street level, where three sides are bounded by brick walls and the fourth, north-western side by a shelter, which is part pati (left, with one floor) and part sattal (right, with two floors), and the entrance to the courtyard. In the eastern corner of the courtyard there is a Ganesha temple.

=== Basin ===
The basin (or hitigah) of the hiti is a rectangle of 882 centimetres (347 in) by 792 centimetres (312 in) and about 83 centimetres (33 in) deep. The main, north facing, staircase has six steps. The basin is surrounded by a brick parapet on three sides. On the fourth side, there is a row of five chaityas between two short stretches of railing and a smaller staircase, flanked by a shrine. In the northern corner of the basin there is a disused tutedhara (overflow reservoir).

=== Spouts ===
Alko Hiti has five spouts: three makara (hitimanga) spouts facing south and two smaller, lower spouts facing west and north respectively. The north facting spout also has the shape of a makara. Contrary to what can be seen in the majority of dhunge dharas, there is no sculpture of Bhagiratha beneath any of the spouts.

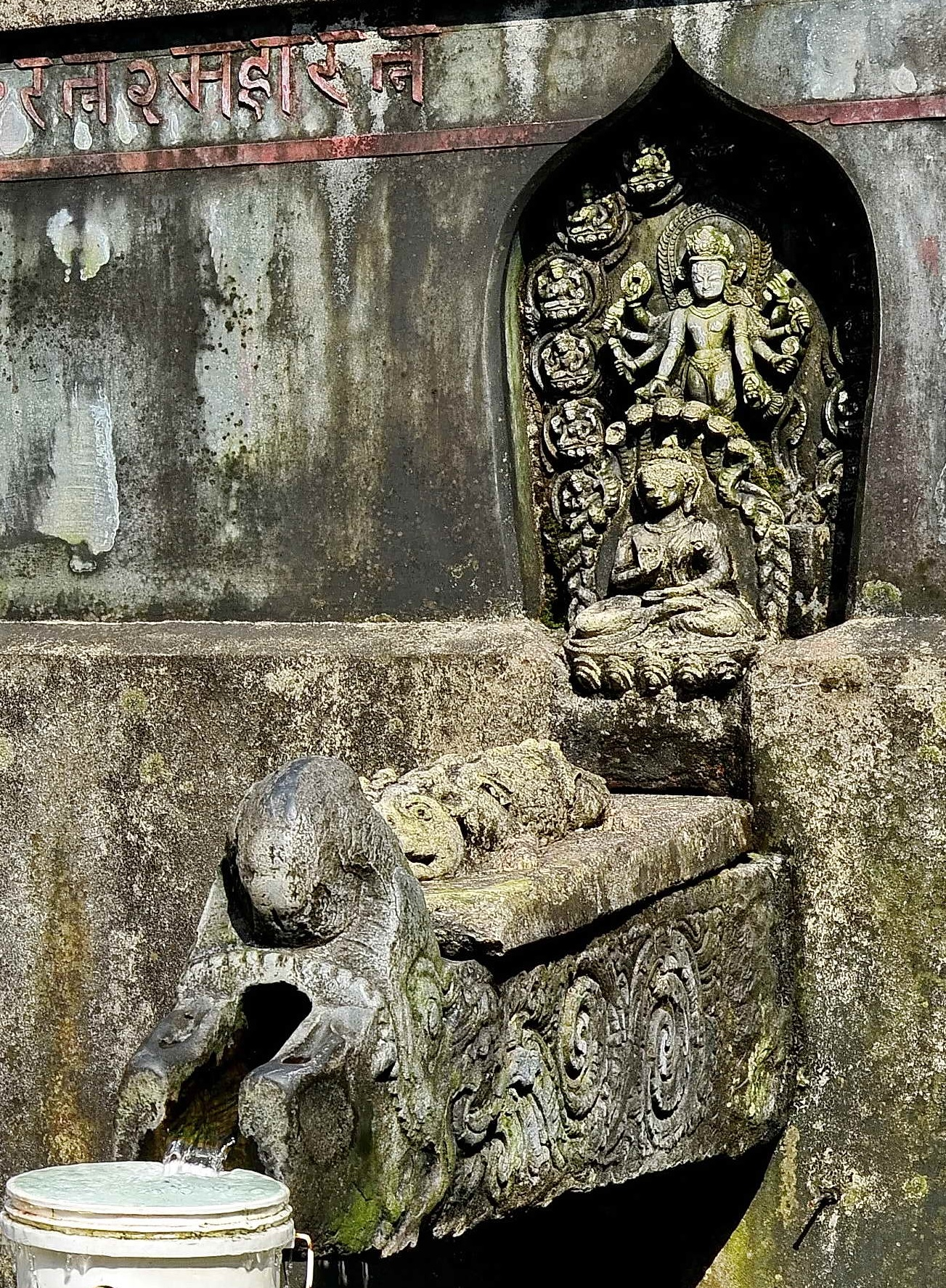
Right makara spout with a Buddha set in front of a Vishnu sculpture

=== Votive sculptures ===
Most of the votive sculptures in and around Alko Hiti are Buddhist, but there are some Hindu sculptures as well. This combination Hindu and Buddhist sculptures, for instance a chaitya next to a lingam, can be found in many dhunge dharas of Nepal.

Above the middle of the three makara spouts there is a niche with a sculpture of Buddha Dharma-Chakra. The makara spout on the left has a Lakshmi Narayan sculpture in its niche, with a Buddha statue in front of it. The spout on the right carries a Visnu sculpture (as Vaikuntha Kamalaja) as well as a Buddha Amoghasiddhi.

Apart from the five chaityas on the edge of the basin, there is another larger chaitya on the bottom. The north-western wall of the hiti basin is dominated by a lifesize statue of a seated Buddha in Bhumisparsa Mudra. The shrine next to the eastern stairs contains a linga. Finally, there is a small shikhara temple, dedicated to Padmapāṇi.

There is also a number of votive sculptures built into the brick walls of the courtyard.

=== Modern additions ===
Since the beginning of the 21st century several elements have been added to Alko Hiti, like a water tower, underground pipes, rainwater recharge pits and ponds. The first recharge well was installed in 2008, the second in 2009.

== The water ==
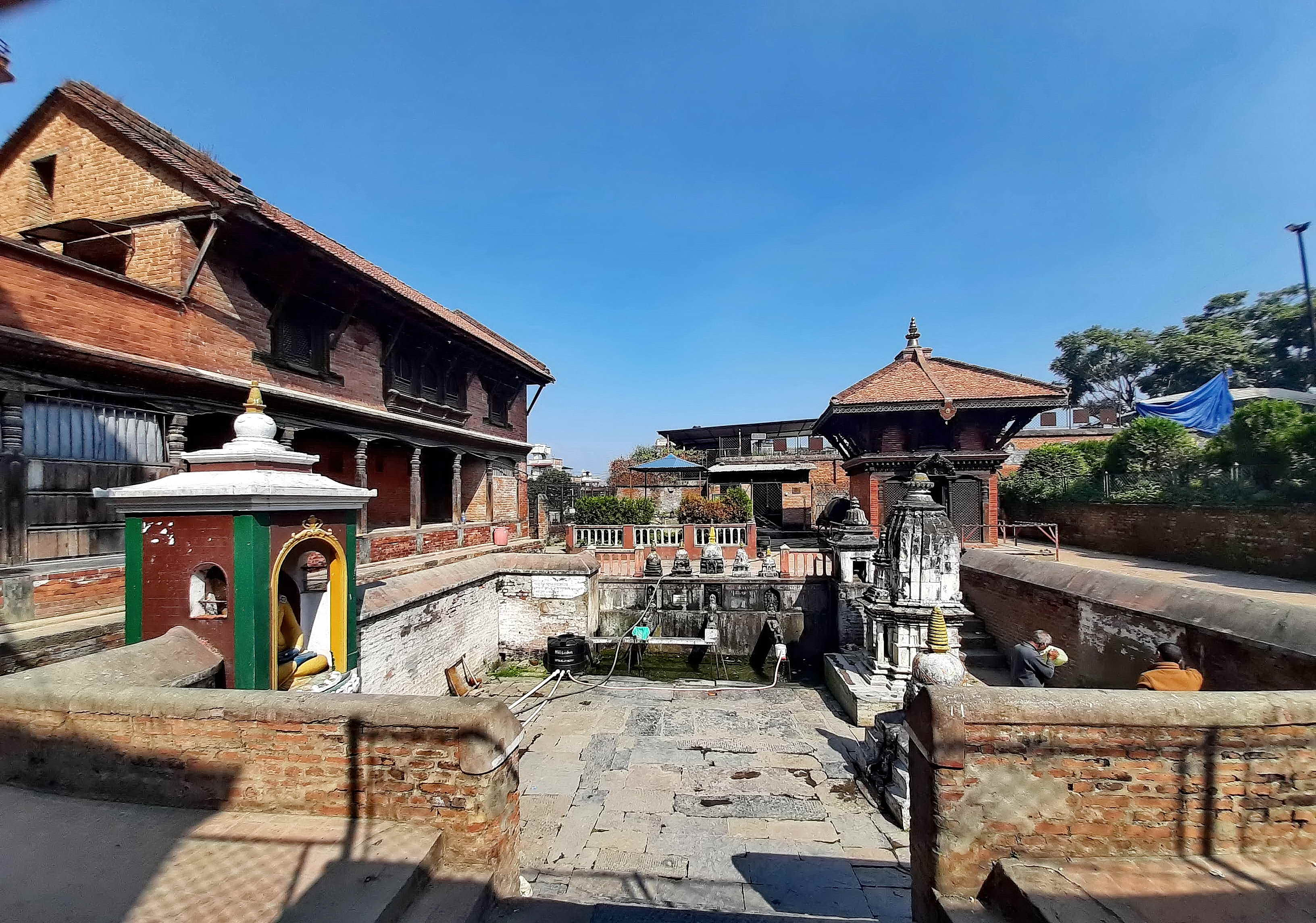
Alko Hiti from the main stairs, with lifesize Buddha statue on the left

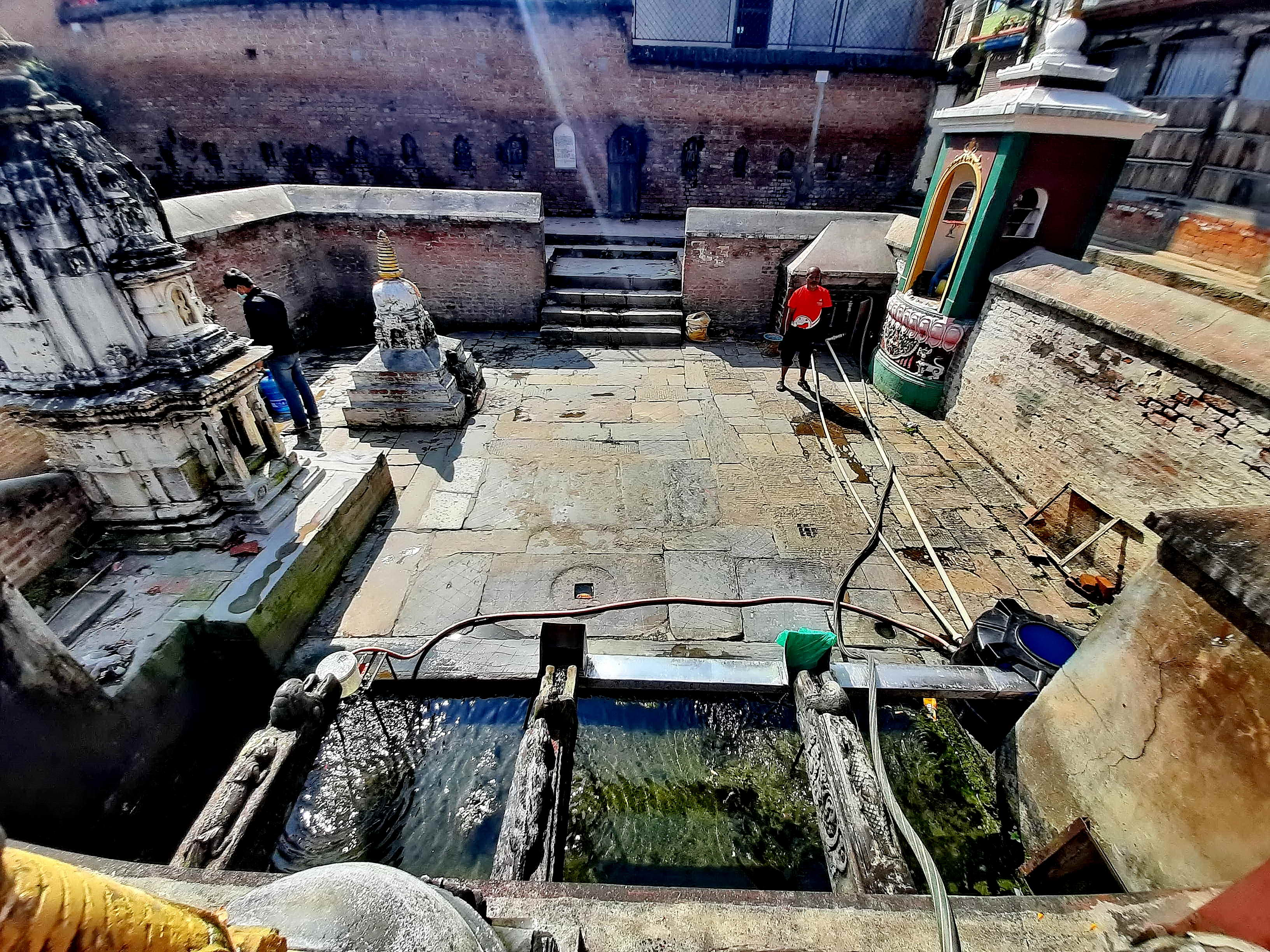
Alko Hiti from the north-east with pipes of the distribution system

=== Sources ===
The five spouts of Alko Hiti give water from three different sources. The two makara spouts on the left are fed by an intake located at around 15 metres north-east of the basin. The makara spout on the right is the most productive. The Ganesha temple next to Alko Hiti is believed to have been built above the source to protect it. The two lower spouts are fed by an aquifer to the south of the hiti.

The water is transported from the sources to the spouts through wooden underground channels (hitidun).

=== Rainwater harvesting ===
Apart from the three original sources of water a system is in place to harvest rainwater in the area and use this to increase the available amount of water. Runoff from an ariea of 310 square metres is captured in sedimentation chambers on the side of the street. From there it is transported to two recharge wells, where it passes a filter system using three media (fine sand, coarse sand and boulder) to eventually recharge the groundwater.

=== Production ===
In 1998, Alko Hiti produced between 267494 and 361152 litres of water per day.

In 2014, the average discharge of water from Alko Hiti was 499402.1 litres of water per day. The quality of the water was within the standards of the World Health Organization for drinking water, with only mild disinfection required.

For 2015, an average daily flow of 683105 litres was measured.

=== Distribution system ===
Since 2004, a distribution system has been put in place by the Aalok Hiti Conservation and Water Supply Users’ Committee (AHCWSUC). For several hours every day, water from the makara spouts is pumped up to a water tower next to the entrance of the courtyard. From there, it is transported to the homes of some 250 households in the area. For one hour a day they can fill their containers to a total of 250 to 300 litres of water. For the service an entrance fee must be paid, along with a modest monthly fee. (These fees were 7,000 rupees and 250 rupees, respectively in 2019.) During the rest of the day Alko Hiti is available to the other users.

During the approximately two months of the dry season the water is supplemented by Kathmandu Upatyaka Khanepani Limited (KUKL), the company dedicated to supplying drinking water in the Kathmandu Valley, using the same distribution system.

Since this scheme was shown to be successful, it has been copied by other neighborhoods using their own water sources.

== Challenges ==
=== Protecting the sources ===
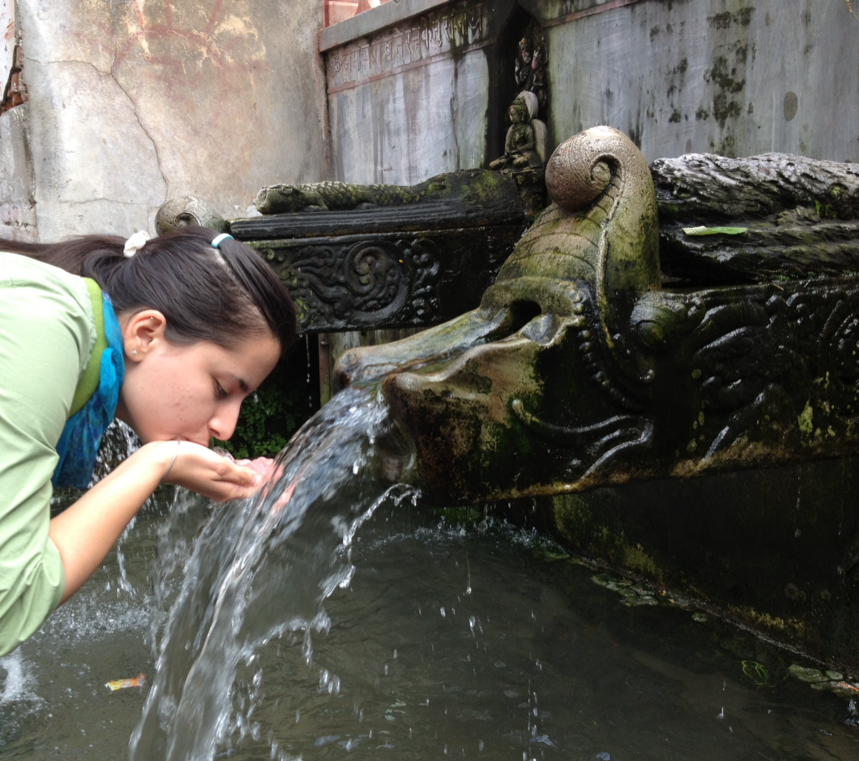
Young woman drinking water at Alko Hiti

The main challenge to the water supply of Alko Hiti is protection of the sources. This requires constant vigilance and the willingness to take action.

A clear example of this has become known as the "Bone mill incident", which took place in the year 2000. The water from two of the five spouts had gotten a strange color and a bad smell. Some of the people who used it had to be taken to a hospital. The problem turned out to be caused by a bone processing plant to the south of the hiti. Water from the factory seeped into the aquifer and eventually came out of the spouts. Only after media attention and prolonged action (like complaining to the municipality, demonstrations and picketing), were the industrial activities at the mill discontinued.

During the maintenance in the sixties, two houses had to be removed from the intake area in the north-east. Unfortunately, it is not entirely clear who owns the land and would be responsible for anything built there.

Agricultural activities have to be monitored, because any deep rooting vegetation, irrigation or fertilization directly affects the aquifers.

=== Volunteerism ===
Another challenge is the fact that all the work has to be done by volunteers. Volunteers accomplished a lot so far, but some form of payment will be needed in the long run. This was true in the 15th century, and it still is true today. In 2014 the interest in performing routine maintenance was already waning.

== See also ==
- Dhunge dhara
- Nagbahal Hiti
- Thanthu Darbar Hiti
- Tusha Hiti
- Tutedhara
