= Nagbahal Hiti =

Stone spouts in Nepal

Coordinates: 27°40′33.5″N 85°19′27.1″E

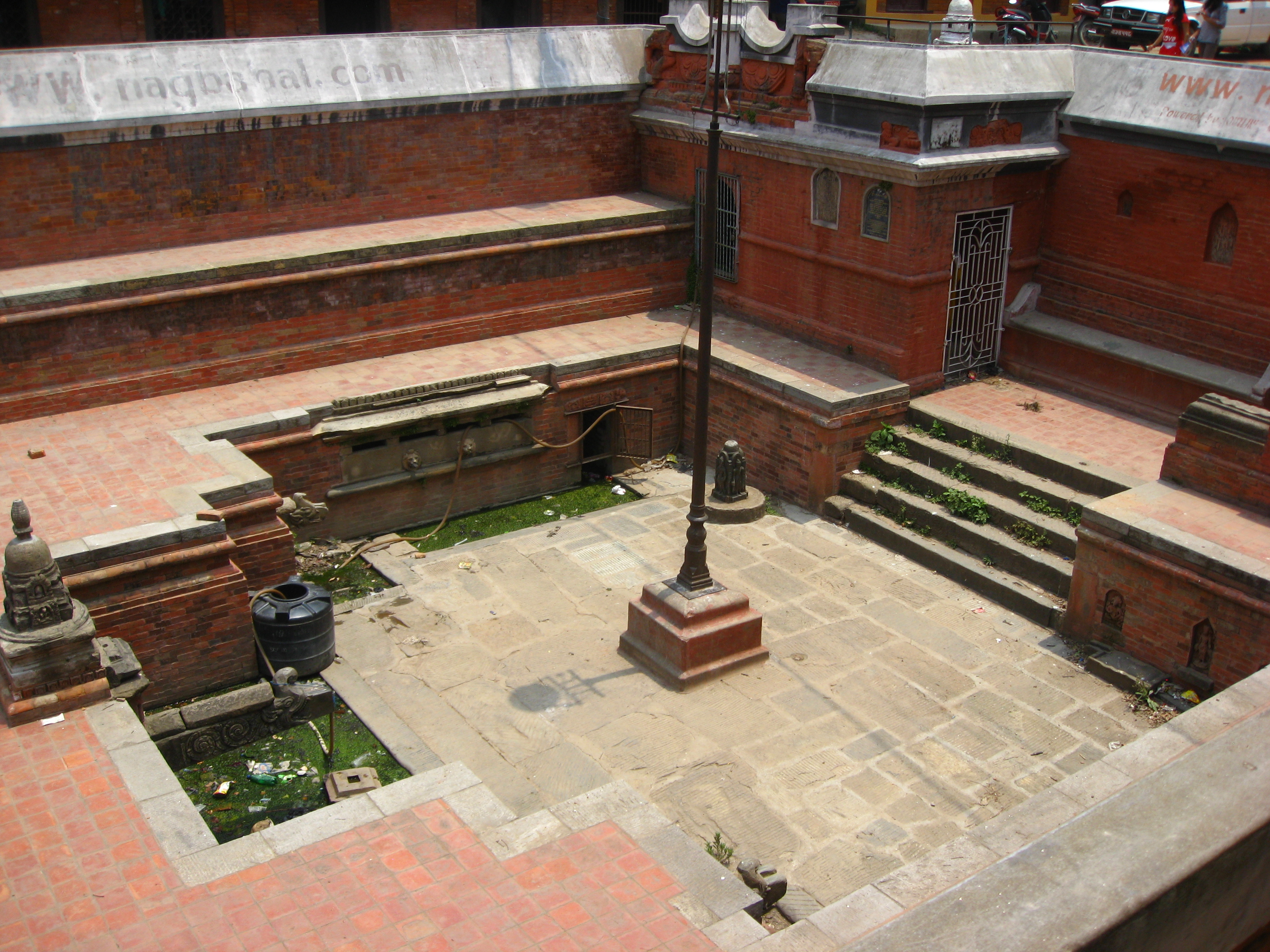
Nagbahal Hiti. The 8th-century stele is on the right at the bottom of the stairs, the life size Buddha statue is behind the grille door at the top

Nagbahal Hiti, also known as Elhānani Hiti, is an old, presumably 8th-century, dhunge dhara (drinking fountain) in Nagbahal, a former Buddhist monastery in the city of Patan, Nepal. In spite of efforts to restore this dhunge dhara, the water is no longer used by the majority of people in the area. However, the space is still being used for cultural events.

== History ==
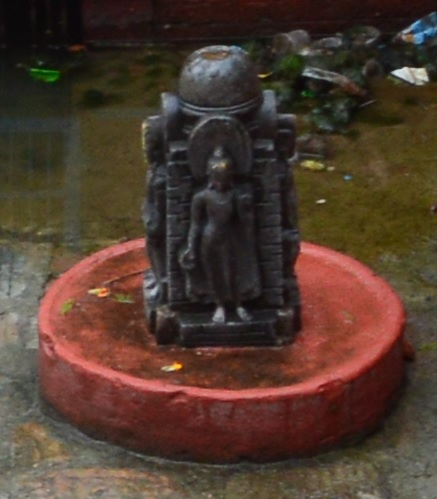
8th century stele

Not much is known about the history of Nagbahal Hiti, but there is one indication of its age: A stele in a corner of the hiti basin dates from the 8th century. The stele shows four reliefs of different Buddhas: Sakyamuni Buddha, Vajrapani, Padmapani Lokeswor and Maitreya.

== Architecture ==
The basin (or hitigah) of the hiti is a rectangle of 4.40 metres (14.4 ft) deep, surrounded by a parapet. There are terraces on two levels, the lowest of which is 1.30 metres (4 ft 3 in) from the bottom. The spout area is 7.17 metres (23.5 ft) long. This includes a spout niche of about 2 metres (6 ft 7 in) deep. The spout area is 7.92 metres (26.0 ft) wide, with the niche being 3.75 metres (12.3 ft) wide.

The walls of the hiti are made of brick, with the edges lined with stone. The two terraces have their floors covered with telia tiles (traditional brick tiles from Nepal), while the bottom floor has stone tiles. The walls and floors of the basin have been made waterproof by coating them with an almost foot-thick layer of a special type of black mud. This prevents water from the surrounding soil from seeping in.

The entrance to the hiti is at the south corner: Behind a covered gate, a flight of stairs leads to the level of the lowest terrace, where it turns left to the bottom of the basin.

Three makara spouts are protruding from the east facing wall; one in the niche and two on both sides next to the niche. A chaitya can be seen above the middle spout. The south facing basin wall has a tutedhara (overflow reservoir) with two taps; one has the shape of a lion and the other of a lioness.

The staircase of the hiti is dominated by a life size statue of the Buddha in Abhayamudra. The walls of the basin carry several reliefs, for instance a relief of Ganesha and two Lokeshvara sculptures.

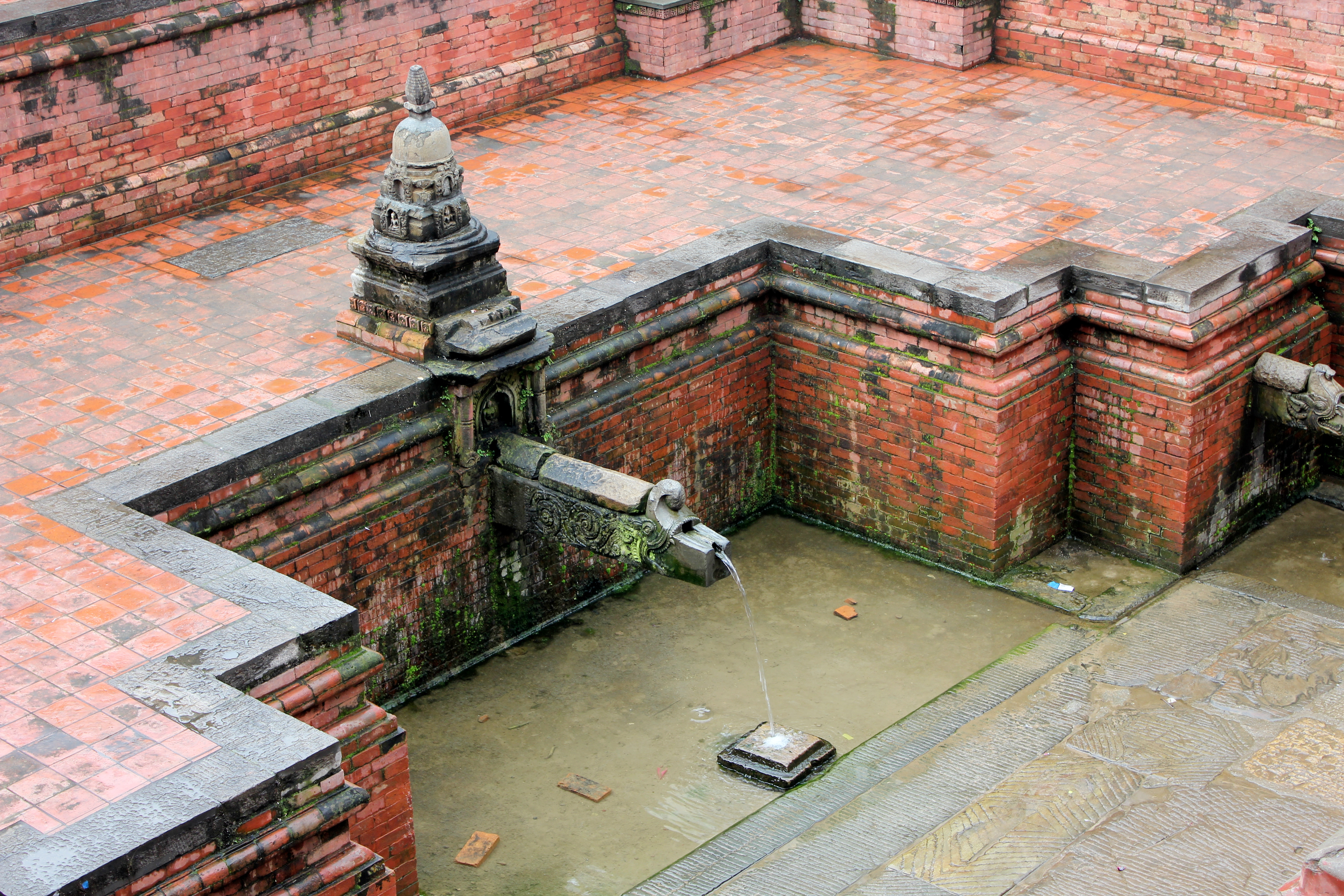
Two spouts of Nagbahal Hiti

== The water ==
The source of Nagbahal Hiti is the Khwayebahi aquifer southeast of the hiti, which in turn was fed by the Tikabhairav Canal, a 16 kilometres (9.9 mi) long rajkulo (royal canal) that transported water from Lele and Naldu rivers to the city of Patan. The water is led from the source to the spouts through a more than 530 metres (1,740 ft) long underground channel made of brick, 230 millimetres (9 in) to 300 millimetres (12 in) underground, 150 millimetres (6 in) to 180 millimetres (7 in) deep and about 100 millimetres (4 in) wide. At places where the channel makes a turn, there is a stone or brick bowl, filled with pebbles.

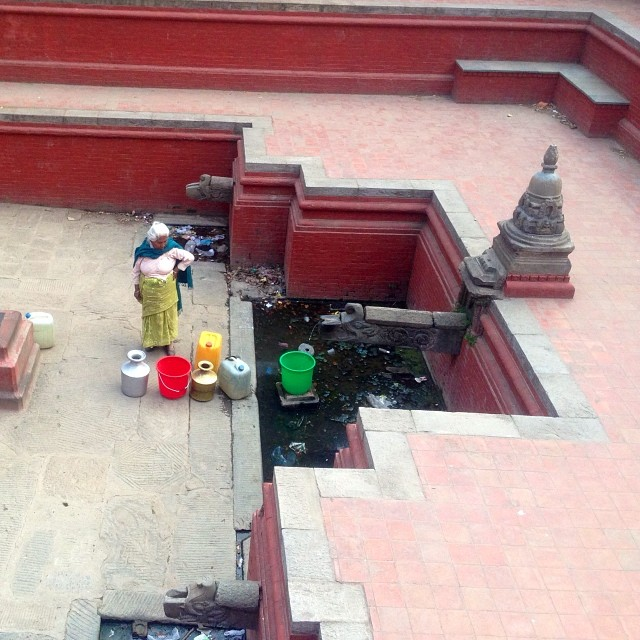
Woman at Nagbahal Hiti in 2014

In 1998, Nagbahal Hiti could produce up to 143424 litres of water per day.

In 2014, the average discharge of water from Nagbahal Hiti was 103542.85 litres of water per day.

For 2015, an average daily flow of 108343 litres was measured.

== Restoration ==
After having been almost completely dry for 10 years, the Nag Bahal Hiti Rehabilitation project restored the hiti, funded by the US Ambassadors Fund for Cultural Preservation and supported by the Nagbahal Hiti User Group.

The works included repairing the inlet channel, while at the same time mapping it, not only for future maintenance, but also to be able to monitor future building activities that could damage the channel. Because the channel runs beneath a denselsy built area of the city, it could not be mapped entirely. Eight manholes were dug along the way for maintenance as well. The outlet channel of the hiti was unclogging and also fixed.

The renovation was completed in September 2008. It resulted in a marked increase of the water flow. More than 100 households in the area would reap the benefits of the project.

Unfortunately, the water has since been contaminated by sewage from a broken sewer line. Only people who do not know this are using the water now.

== Nagbahal Hiti in popular culture ==
The terraced space of Nagbahal Hiti has been used as a music venue on several occasions.

On 5 September 2015 there was a concert of Mohani Dhun at Nagbahal Hiti.

On 12 March 2016 and 26 February 2020 Group Dhaa (Drum) gave a concert inside Nagbahal Hiti during the Samyak Mahadan celebrations.

From 23 November to 7 December 2018 the Micro Galleries global arts initiative organised an event in the Nagbahal, Nakabahil and Swotha areas of Patan. A music workshop titled "Singing by a Water Fountain" in Nagbahal Hiti was part of the program.

== See also ==
- Alko Hiti
- Dhunge dhara
- Thanthu Darbar Hiti
- Tusha Hiti
- Tutedhara
