= Dipankha Yatra =

Pilgrimage in Nepal

Dipankha Yatra (Devanagari: दिपंखा यात्रा) (also spelt Deepankha Yatra, Dipankar Yatra) is a pilgrimage that takes place around the heart of Nepal "The Kathmandu Valley". Devotees walk through the journey barefooted to 131 religious destinations within 2 days. The timing is decided by the astrological calendar. Dipankha Yatra is mostly celebrated by Buddhist as well as Hindu Newars of the valley. The followers are guided by Gurjus of Newar community. It takes place only when five events fall on the same day:

- Sauryamas Sankranti (First day in solar calendar)
- Chandramas Purnima (Full moon)
- Rewati Nachetra (An astrological event)
- Harshan Yog (An astrological event)
- Chandra Grahan (Lunar Eclipse)

It is believed that a single step in the Yatra equals the Punya gained upon offering 1 tola of gold. The procession begins at Nagbahal, Patan at dawn and ends at Mahalaxmisthan the following day.

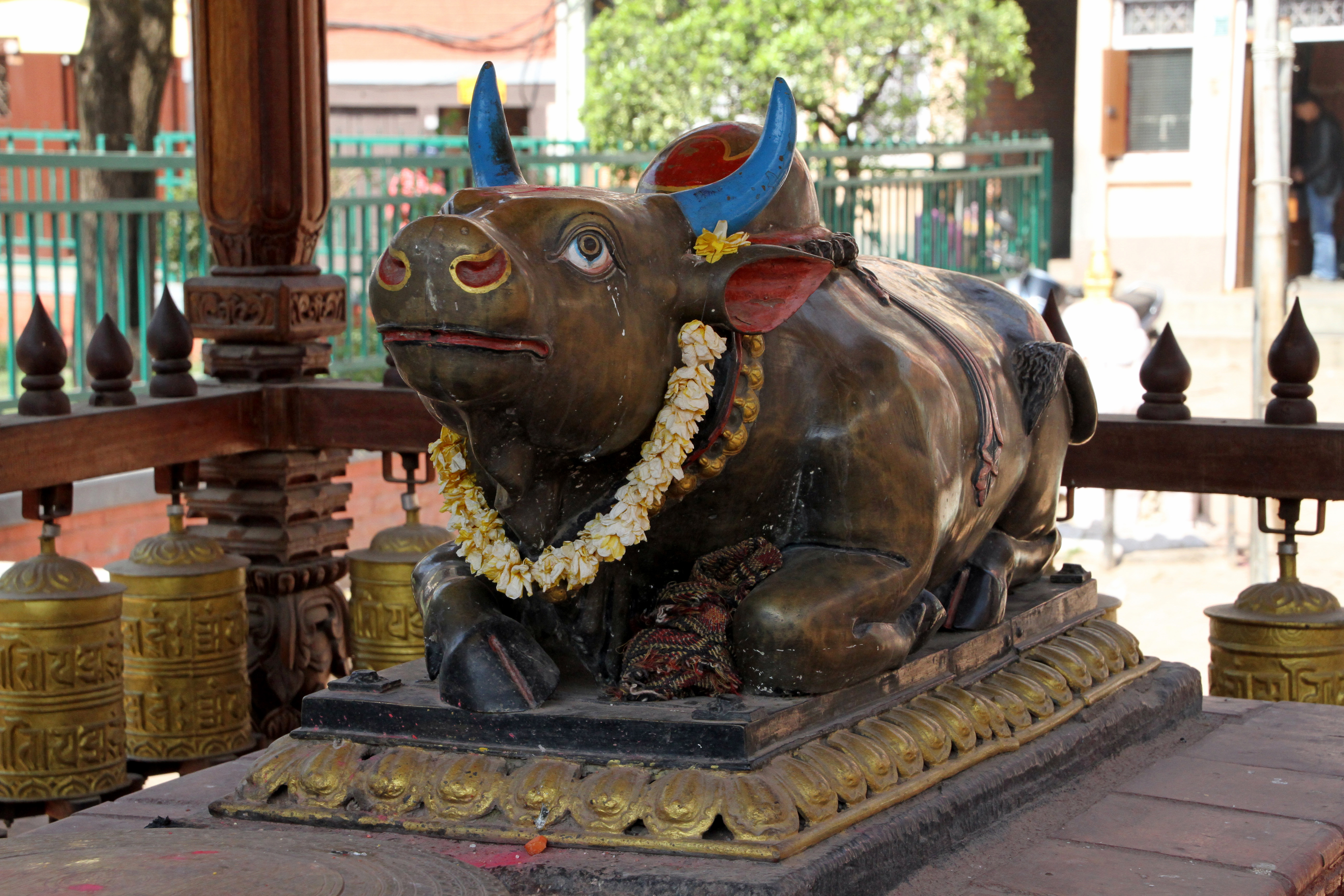
The Blue Horned Oxen

== Partial list of the 131 destinations ==
- Neel Thu (The Blue Horned Oxen at Nagbahal) start
- Kumbeshwar
- Krishna Mandir (Mangal bazar)
- Karya Binayak (Bungamati)
- Anandadi Lokeshwor (Chobaha)
- Hasapota Ganesh (Jhamsikhel)
- Ashok Binayak (Maru)
- Ichangu Narayan
- Pula Swayambhu (Old swayambhu)
- Vayupur
- Swayambhu Mahachaitya
- Indrayani
- Naxal Bhagwati
- Khasti Chaitya (Boudhanath) day end
- Gujeshwori
- Ashok Chaitya (Lagankhel) end

Dipankha Yatra was organized on 17 October 2005 (Monday, Ashwin 31, 2062 B.S.) 38 years after the prior event. An estimate of 100,000 people participated in the journey. The next Dipankha Yatra took place on 18 October 2013 (Sunday, Ashoj 1, 2070).
