= Tusha Hiti =

17th century royal bath in Lalitpur, Nepal

Coordinates: 27°40′21.8″N 85°19′30.4″E

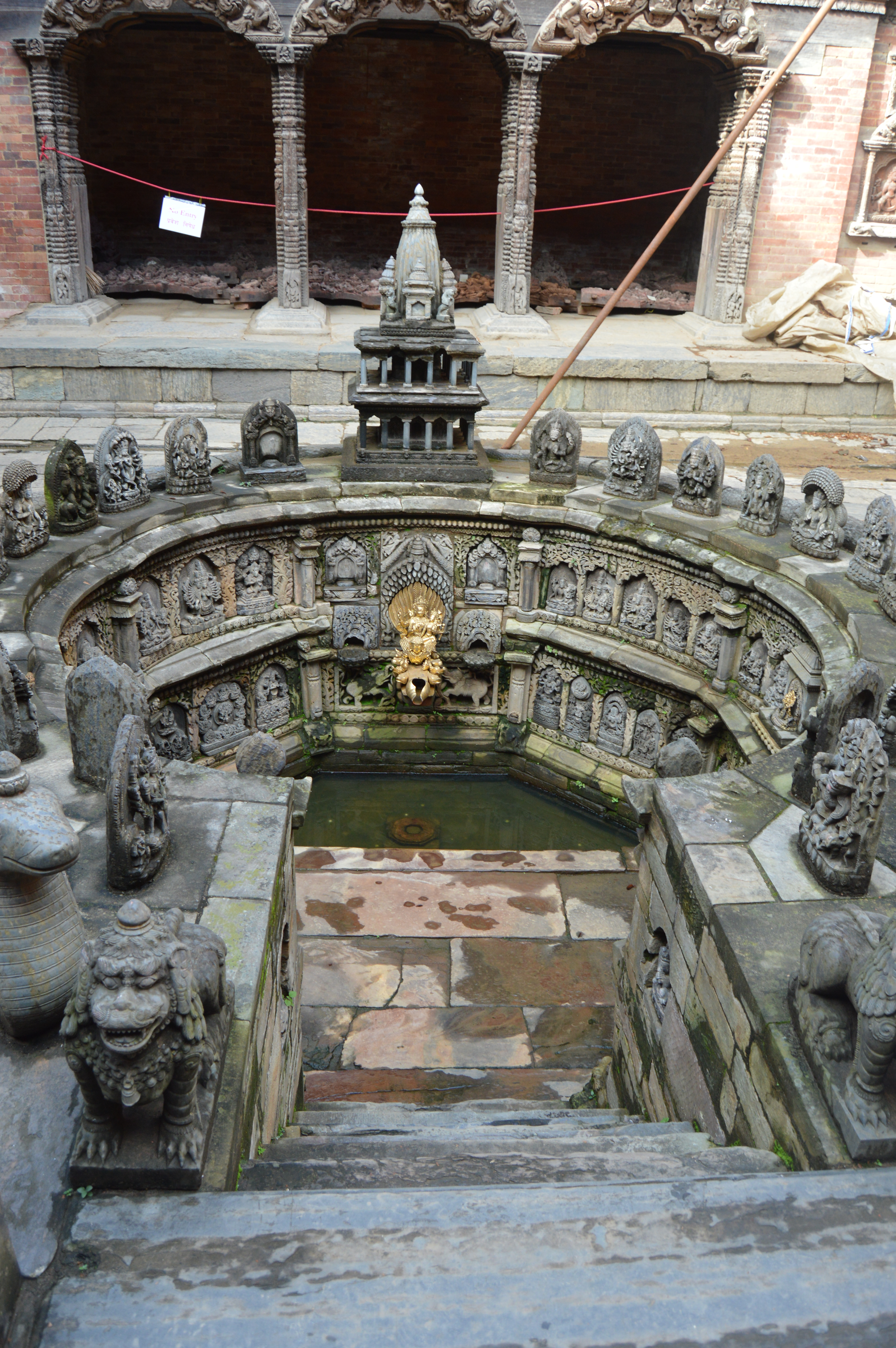
- Tusha Hiti in 2016
- Interactive map of the Tusha Hiti area
- Alternative names: Royal Bath

General information
- Location: Sundari Chowk, Patan Durbar Square,, Lalitpur, Nepal

The Tusha Hiti or Tusa Hiti, also known as Royal Bath, is a sunken bath that was used by the Malla royal family in Nepal. It is at the courtyard of Sundari Chowk, Patan Durbar Square, Lalitpur. King Siddhi Narasimha Malla is credited with building the bath in the 17th century. The walls feature idols of Hindu gods and goddesses. Among them are images of Ashtamatrikas, Ashta Bhairavas, eight Nāgas and Dashavatara (ten avatars of Lord Vishnu). Most are made of stone, but some are made of gilt metal. At present there is no water coming from the golden spout.

== Etymology ==
Four different theories tell us how Tusha Hiti came by its name.

According to historian Dhanavajra Vajracharya Tusha Hiti got its name because the water that came from the spout tasted like sugarcane juice. In the Newar language tu means sugarcane and sha means taste. Another historian argues that the hiti's water source might have been from a well; in Newar tun is a well and tunsala is the water brought from a well. Over time it became known as Tusha Hiti. According to a third theory the name is derived from the Newar word for bull, thunsa, because of the likeness of the spout with the head of a bull. However according to Nepalese scholar Mangalananda Rajopadhyay the name is derived from the Newar word tusalegu (to draw a line) to denote the considerable distance the water had to travel from the source to the hiti.

== History ==
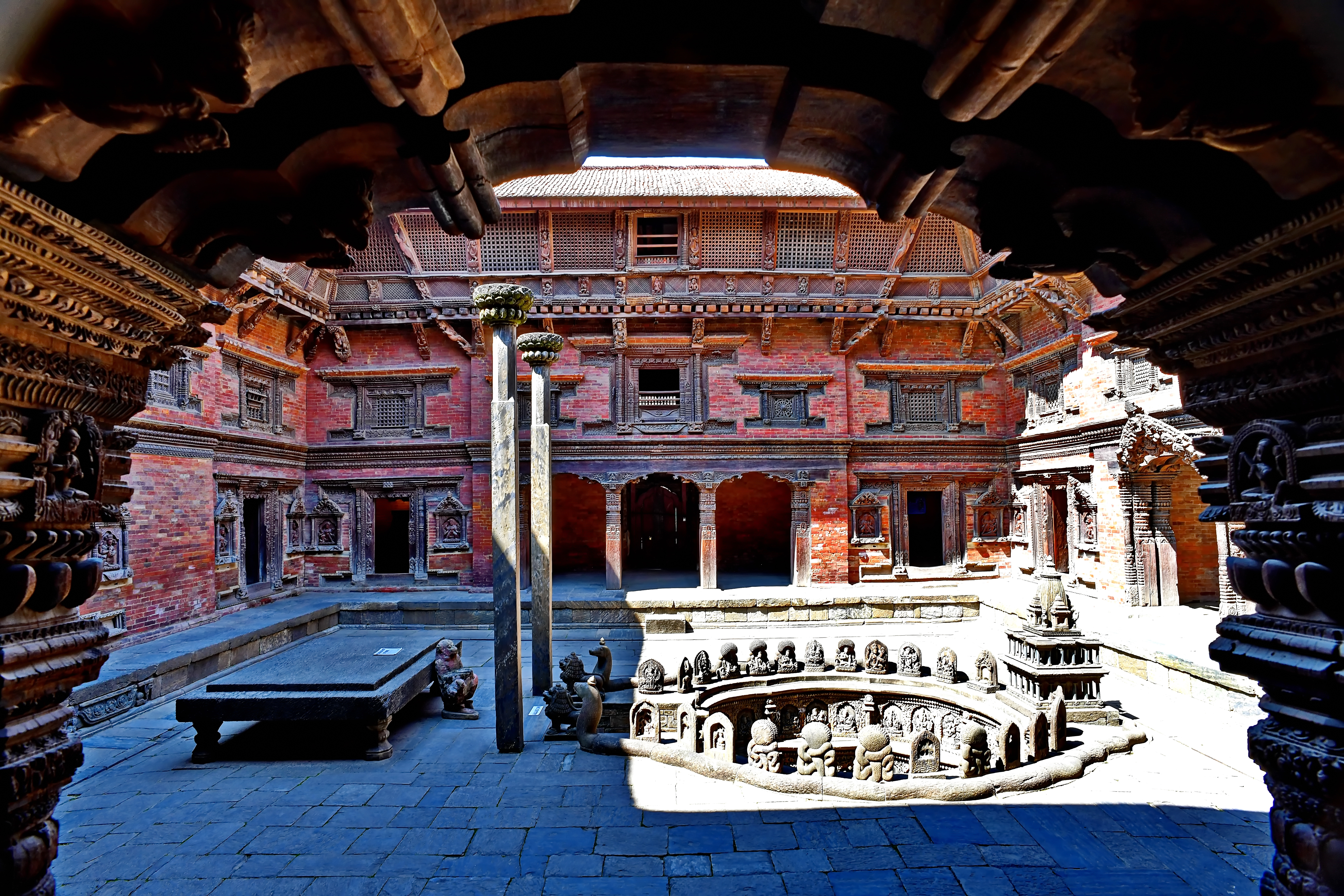
Sundari Chowk with Tusha Hiti and nearby stone slab

In 2019, a survey by the Kathmandu Valley Water Supply Management Board (KVWSMB) found a total of 573 hitis on record in the ten municipalities of the Kathmandu Valley. Of the 80 hitis on record in Lalitpur 72 could still be found.

The Malla Dynasty, the ruling dynasty of Kathmandu Valley, built various hitis for themselves that resembled their palaces enhanced with many decorations. Siddhinarasimha Malla, who was mostly devoted to Hinduism, is credited with building Tusha Hiti.

Scholars are not certain about when the Tusha Hiti was built; some cite the years 1627, 1626, and 1647 AD.

Whether Tusha Hiti was actually used as a regular bath is also a point of contention among historians. It might have had other purposes; one historian stated that it is impossible to use the bath without splashing the images of gods with the polluted water from the human body. Siddhinarasimha Malla was an ascetic king who could not have used the bath to offend the gods with an "impure act". Other historians say that it was not made to be used as a bath but for "aqua-oblations" to gods. To take a normal bath, the royal family had a second bath at their disposal: Bhandarkhal Hiti is also on the palace grounds.

According to the legend, the king used to wake up early in the morning and take a shower in the Tusha Hiti, then meditated for hours on the stone slab near the bath. After the shower, his attendants would provide him with towels and wraps, while the queen and others watched from the carved wooden windows. Apparently, then the king would lie on a stone bed and be massaged with oils.

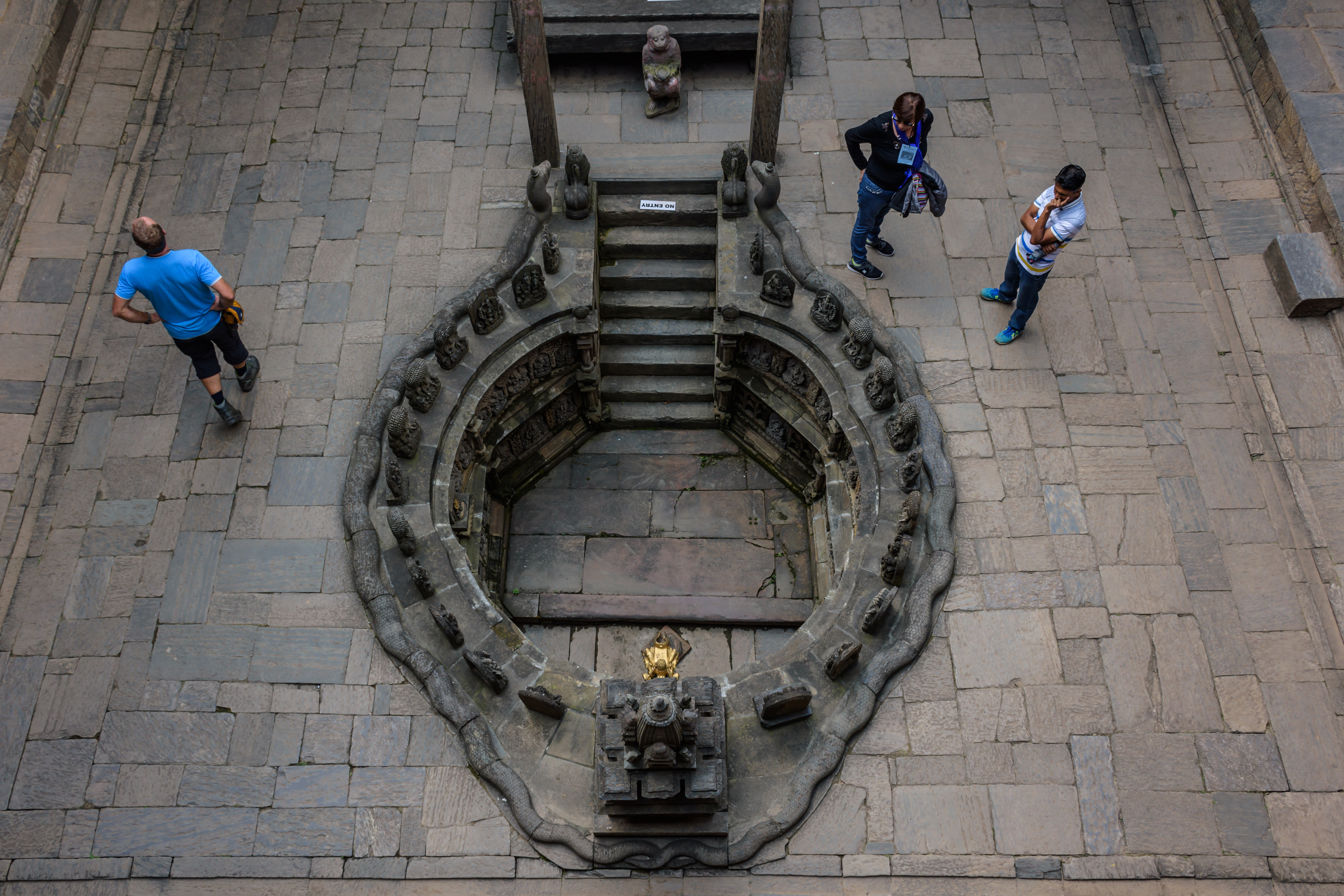
Tusha Hiti from above

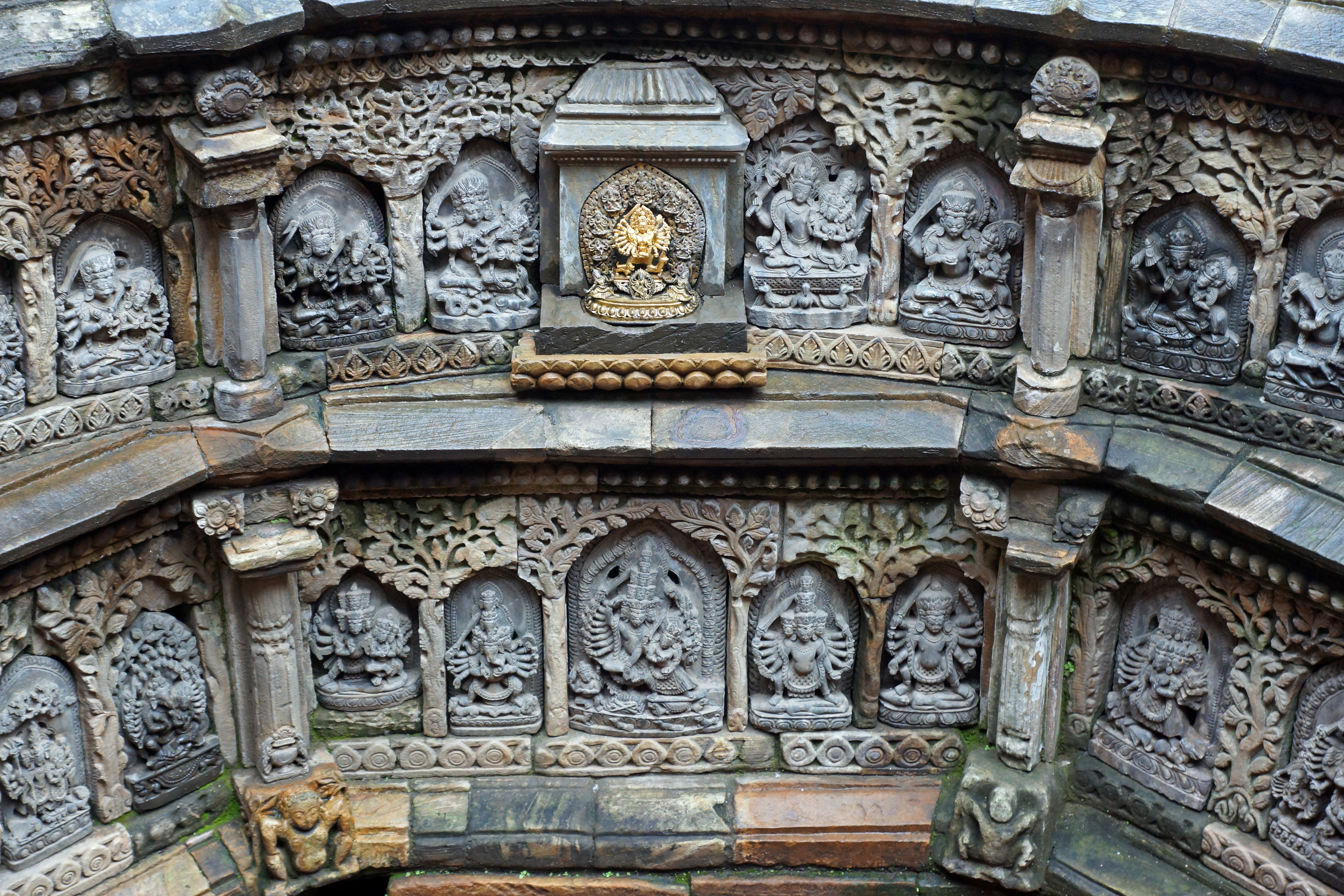
Eastern section of the basin wall

After the 1934 Nepal–India earthquake, the Tusha Hiti was abandoned. It was restored in 1960.

It was reported in 2000 that bath was being guarded by the police.

In the summer of 2010 another restoration took place, by a team from the University of Applied Arts Vienna.

A 2015 report conducted by the Kathmandu Valley Preservation Trust noted that the bath was providing clean water in 2009, but after the April 2015 Nepal earthquake, the water became polluted.

Today there is no more water flowing from the spout.

== Architecture ==
The Tusha Hiti can be accessed via the main entrance of Sundari Chowk in the western façade. The entrance to the courtyard features idols of Hanuman, Ganesha and Narasingh.

The entire bath is shaped like yoni, a representation of female sexuality, and is surrounded by serpents. The bath is 150 cm (59 in) below the courtyard. The distance between the walls inside the bath is 254 cm (100 in). Overall Tusha Hiti is about 5.3 m (17 ft) long and 4 m (13 ft) wide. A small replica of the Krishna Mandir is featured in its main axis.

=== Octagonal basin ===
The basin has an octagonal shape, which underscores the devotion of Siddhinarasimha to the eight Nāgas. The spout occupies the northern wall of the basin (section) and the nine steps of the stairs the opposite side. The stairs of Tusha Hiti are paved with stone slabs and are flanked by a rare image of Ajaikapad Rudra on one side and a Dwaradeva image on the other. The other six wall segments are each filled with two rows of a variety of images of deities.

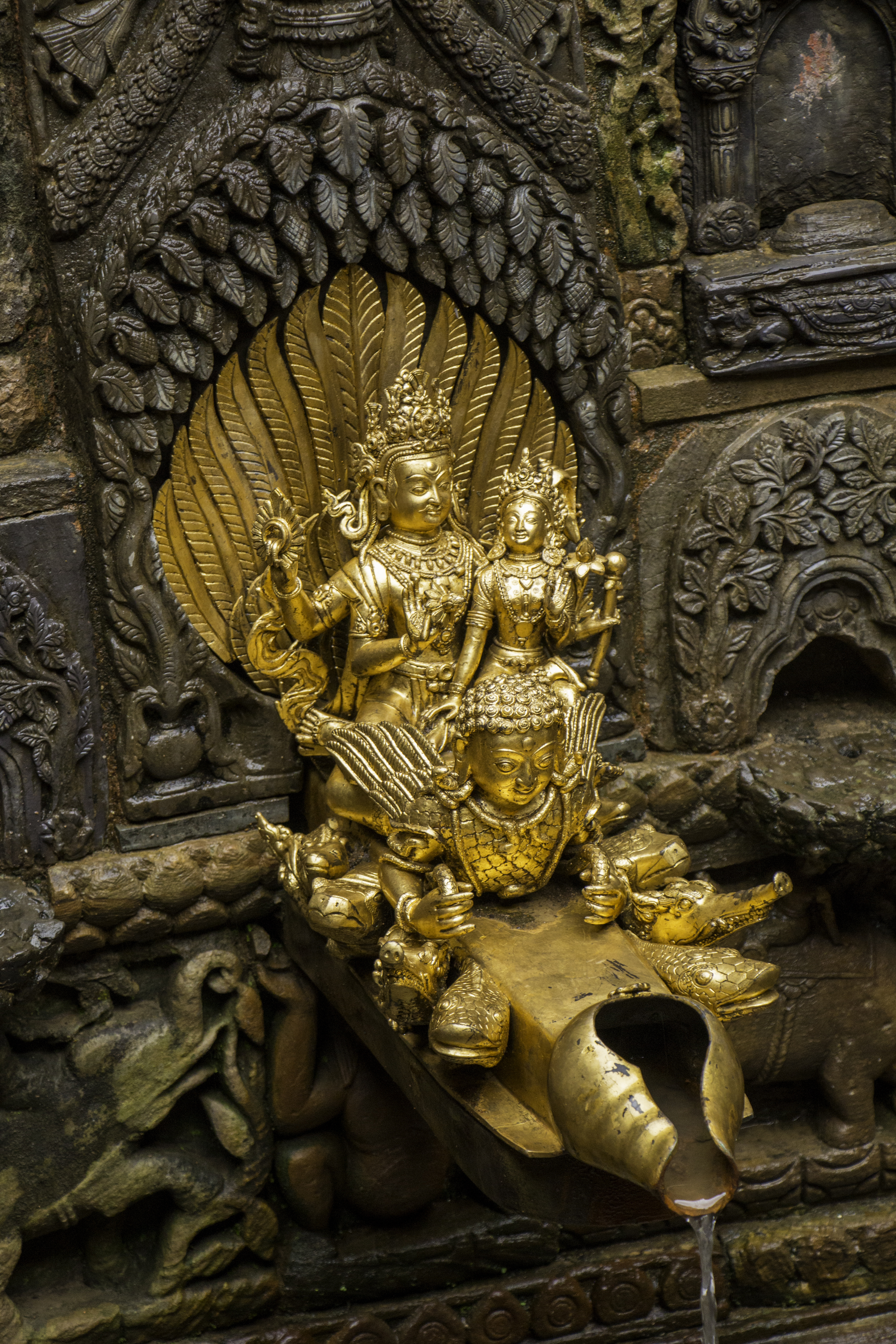
In September 2016 there was water flowing from the spout

=== The spout ===
The spout protrudes 55 cm (22 in) from the spout wall and ends in a tip at 90 cm (35 in) below the courtyard level. In front of the spout a section of the basin floor is made 15 cm (5.9 in) lower, forming a pool that collects the water from the spout.

The spout is made of gilt copper and decorated with the idols of the Hindu god and goddess Vishnu and Laxmi riding on Garuda. The sides of the spout were each decorated with the same row of water related animals: a frog, a turtle, a crocodile, a fish and at the front a makara. The two creatures in the back are a bit of an enigma. Different authors refer to them not only as frogs, but also as calves and sea monsters. By the end of 1974 the makara figures were gone. Three small nymphs in front of Garuda had already disappeared by 1968. The spout seen today is a replica. The original was stolen in 2010 but later recovered. The top portion of the spout (Lakshmi Narayan with Garuda) is on display in the National Museum of Nepal. In the replica the makaras and the nymphs that were on the original, are still missing.

Below the spout there is a sculpture of Bhagiratha, flanked by two reliëfs of elephants. Professor Gautama V. Vajracharya recognizes the character beneath the spout as a yaksha. Mary Shepherd Slusser refers to these characters as Bhagiratha and an atlante respectively. Both Bhagiratha and atlantes are a common occurrence in the hitis of Nepal, where Bhagiratha is most commonly found under spouts from the Malla period.

=== Other sculptures ===
Together with the two serpents surrounding the bath, two stone lions guard the entrance to Tusha Hiti. Furthermore there are 24 statues on the edge of the basin at the ground level. Eight of these can be recognized as Nāga by their canopy and their lotus position.

Tusha Hiti currently houses a total of 72 stone sculptures of deities. These can be divided into Vedic, Tantric, Shaiva, Vaishnava and Shakta idols. Some are damaged, while others appear to be stolen. However, some niches may have been left empty on purpose. The identities of many of the depicted deities are still unclear. The research is ongoing. Professor Gudrun Bühnemann, for example, identified two images as the composite goddess Harishankari or Jhankeshvari and the goddess Ugratara respectively in 2008.

The most noticeable sculpture resides in the eastern wall segment of the basin. It is a small shrine with the gilt image of the goddess Ugrachandi, surrounded by tiny, also gilt, images of Navadurgas. Unfortunately the original Ugrachandi image was stolen some decades ago, and has since been replaced.

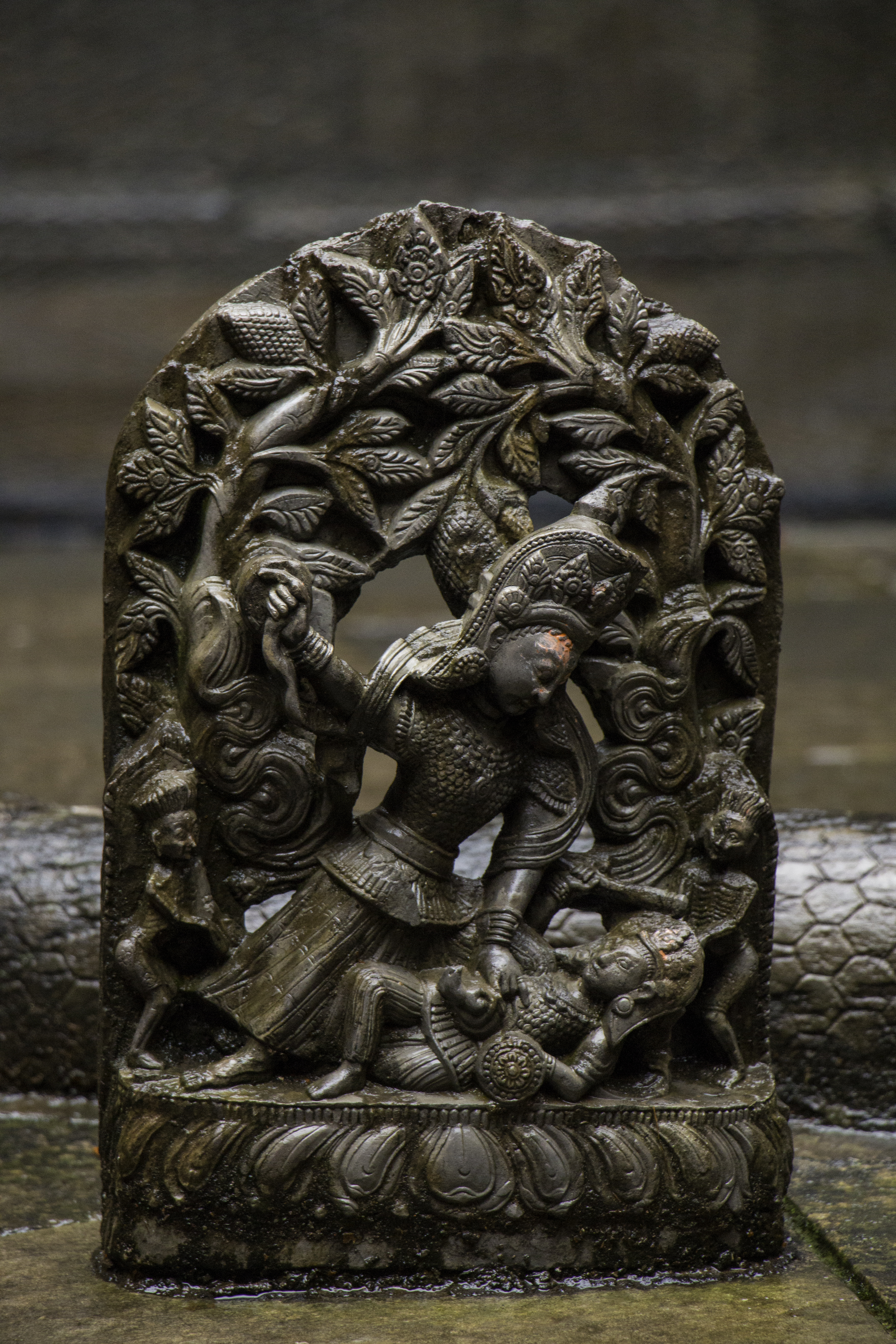
Bhimasena killing Dushasana

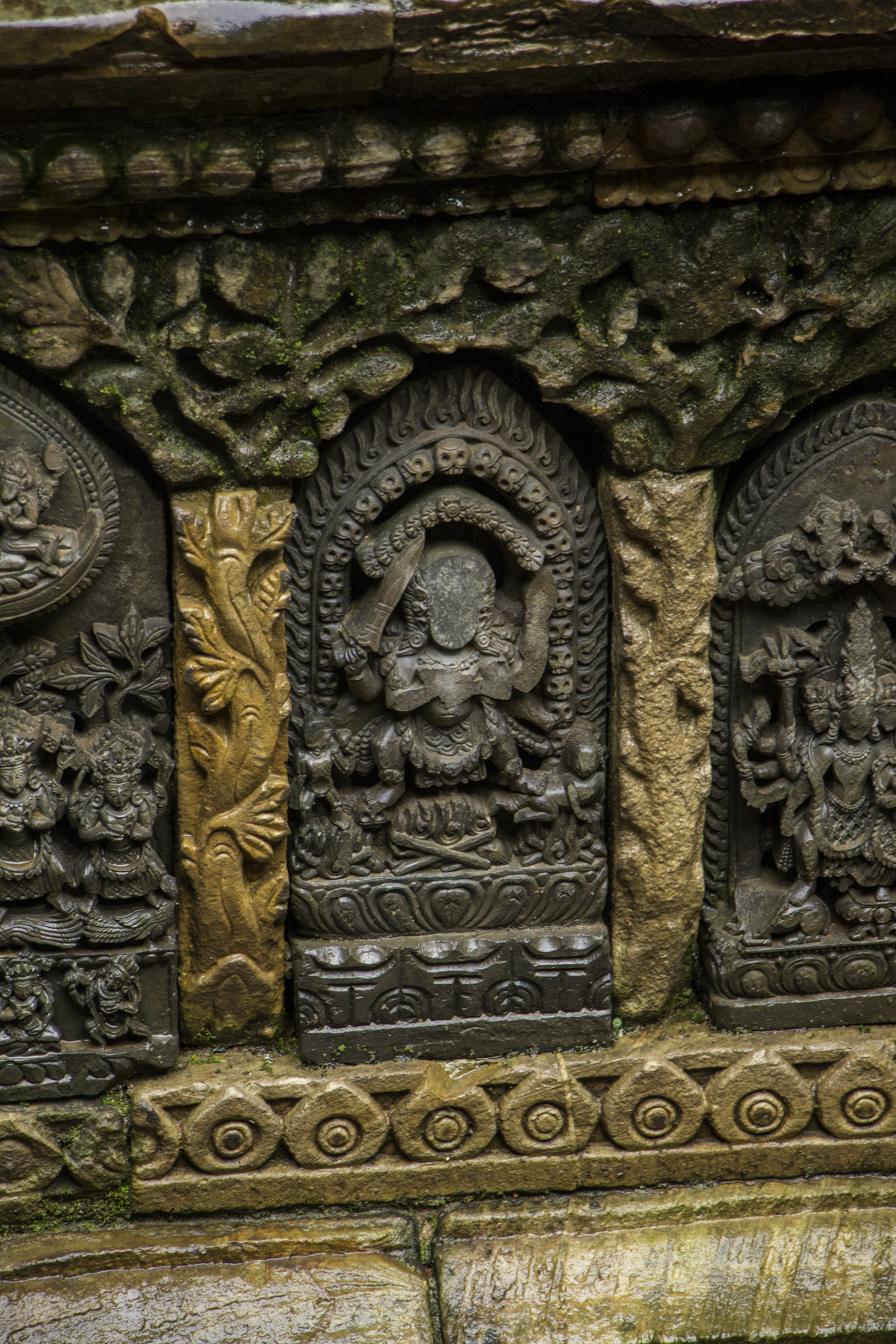
Ugratara

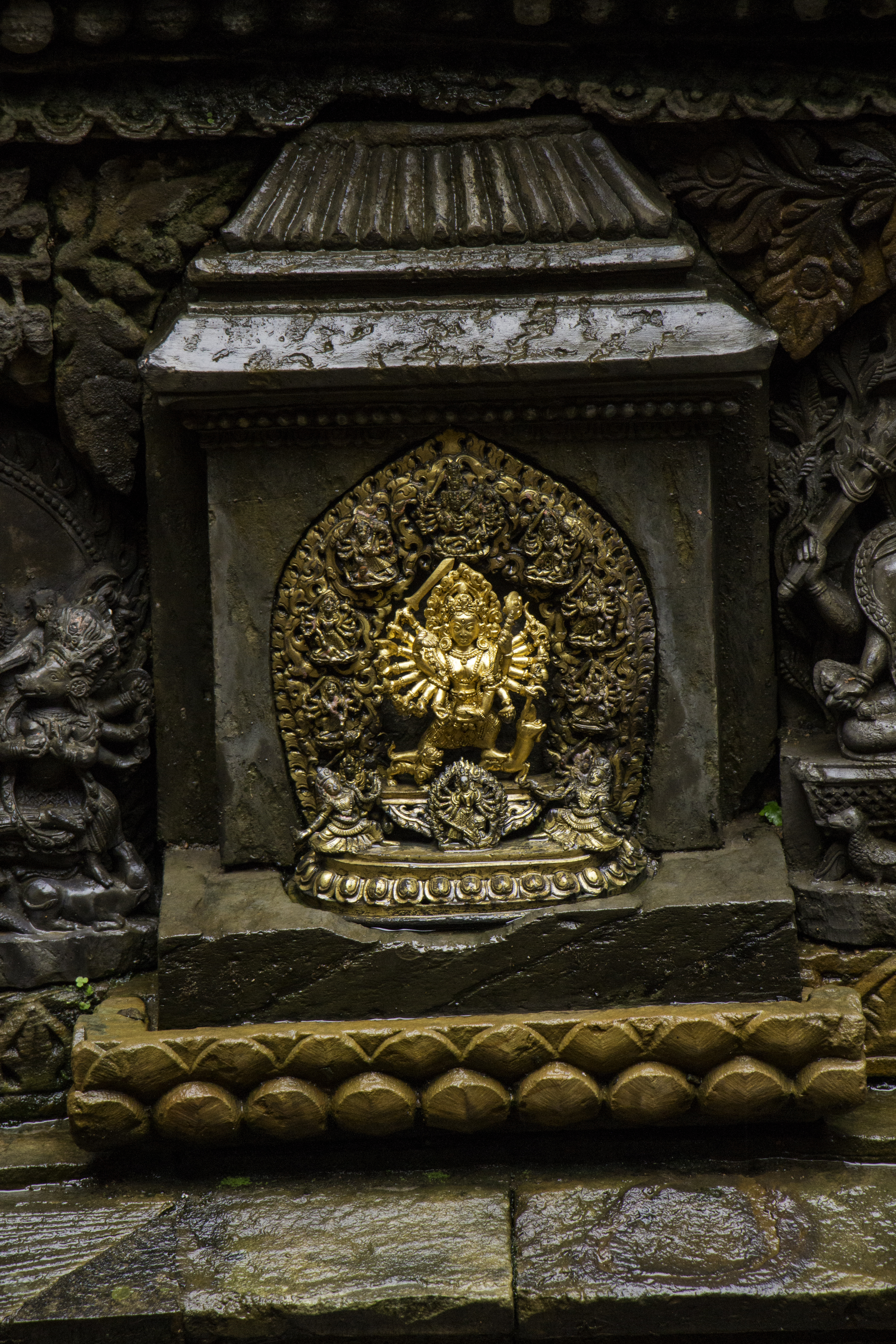
Ugrachandi shrine

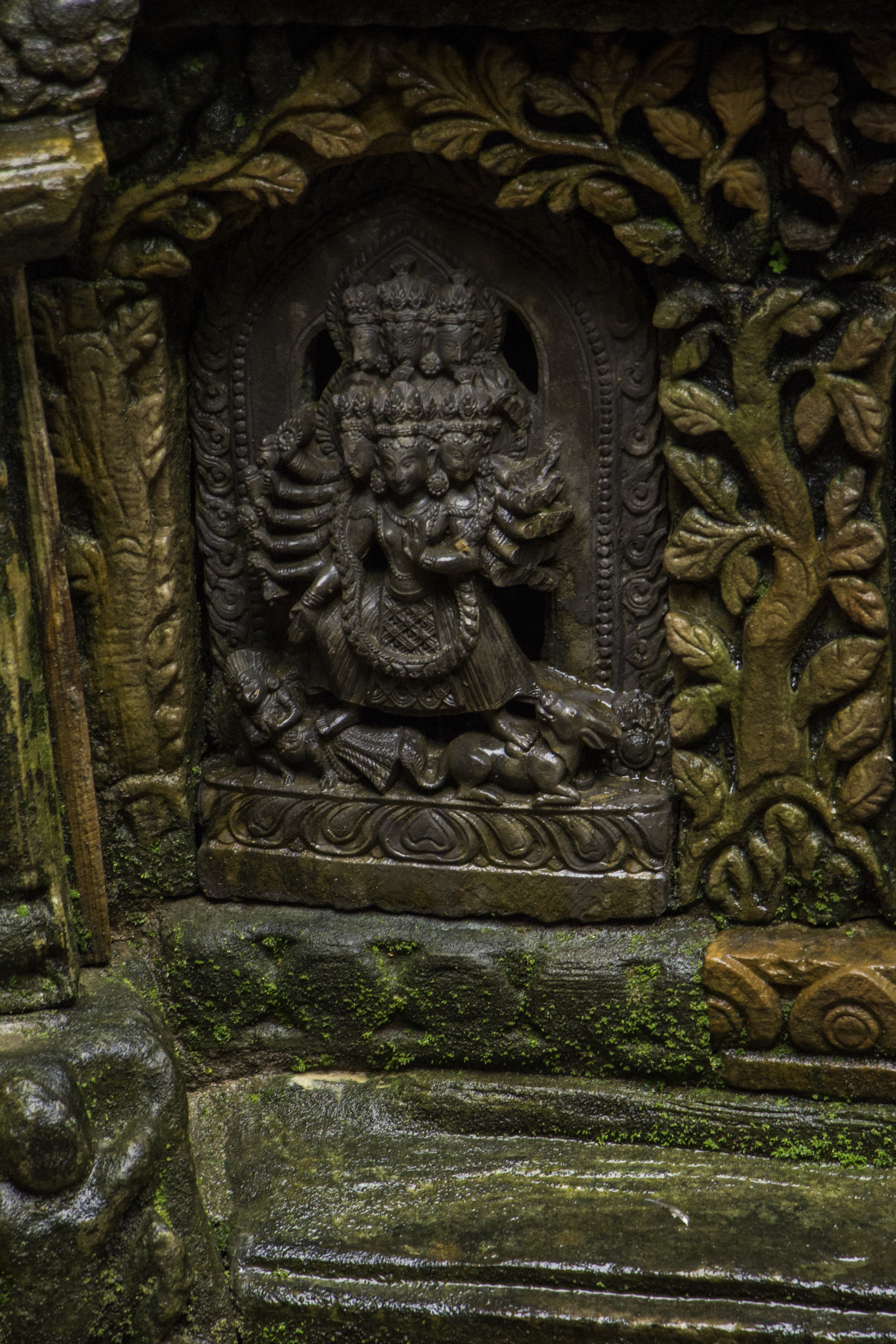
Harishankari or Jhankeshvari

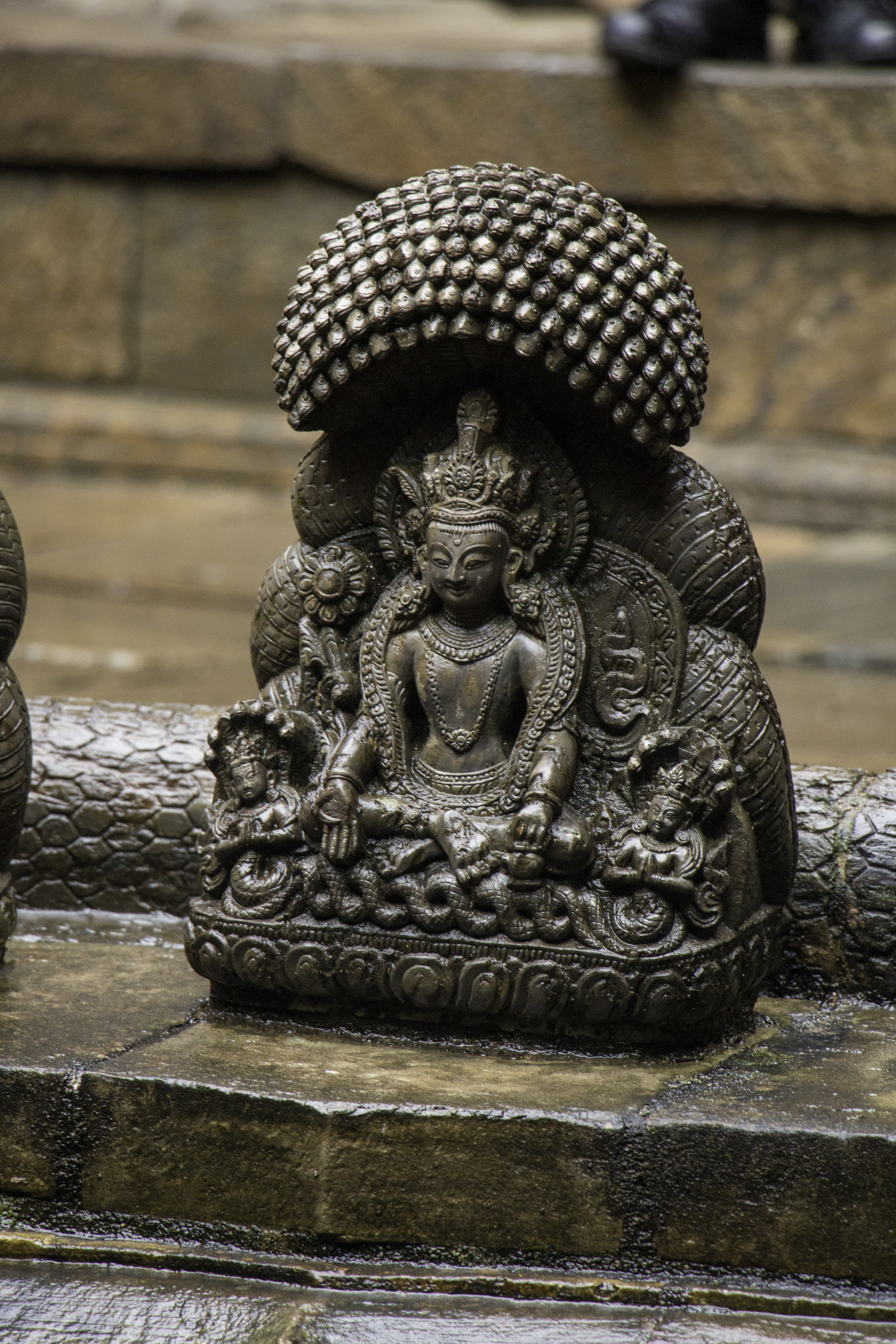
Nāga

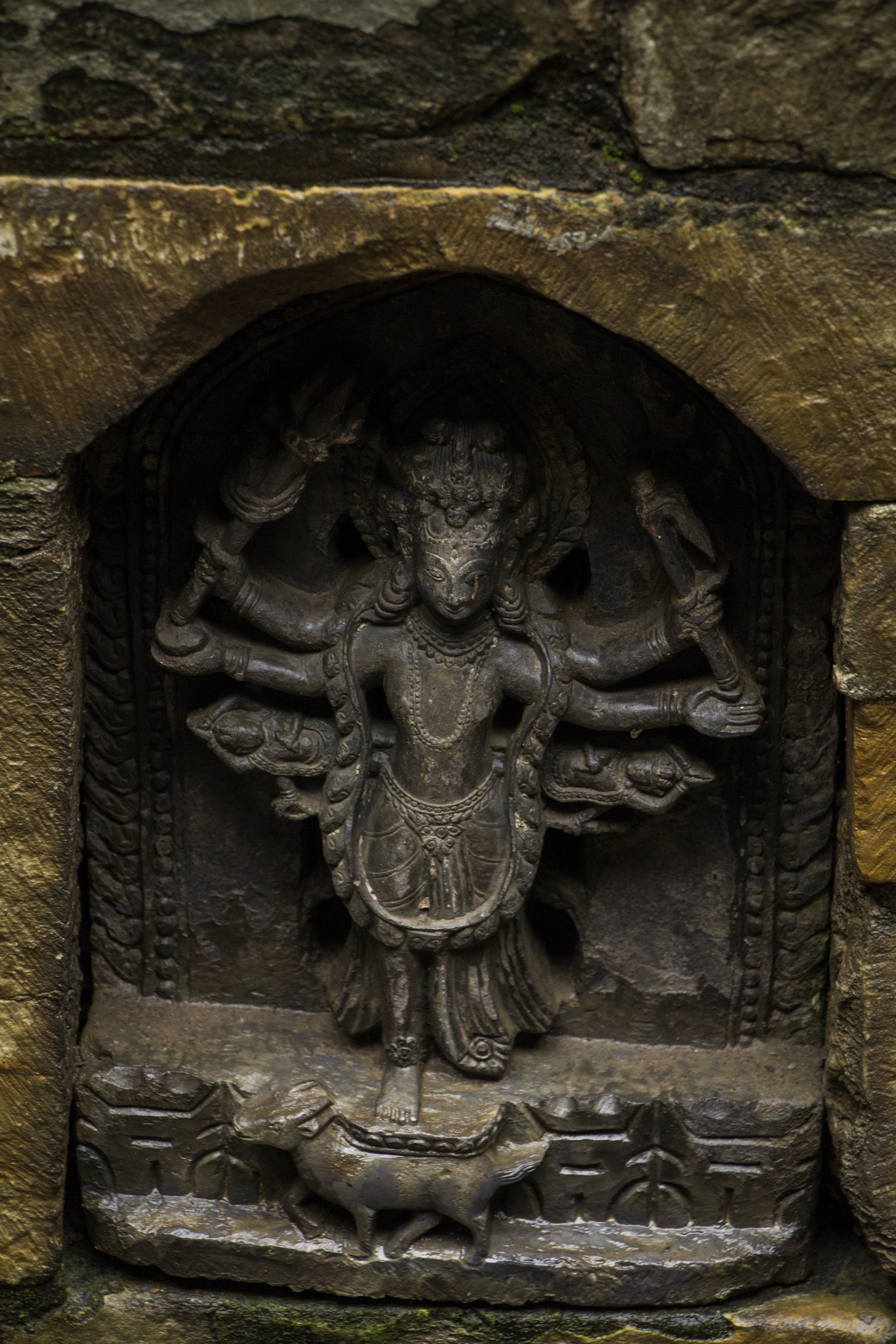
Ajaikapad Rudra

=== The water ===
The source of the water has been identified as the Naricha aquifer. Tusha Hiti shared this source with Tangal Hiti, Thapa Hiti, Saugah Hiti and Bhandarkhal Hiti. The Naricha aquifer in turn was fed by ponds in the area and these received their water from a 17th century rajkulo (royal canal). This canal transported water from Lele and Naldu rivers to several ponds in Patan. The water was further led from the source to the hitis through old, 17th century underground pipelines, made of interlocking U-shaped terracotta segments, topped with bricks and covered with clay. Both Bhandarkhal Hiti and Tusha Hiti discharged their water into the Bhandarkhal Pond.

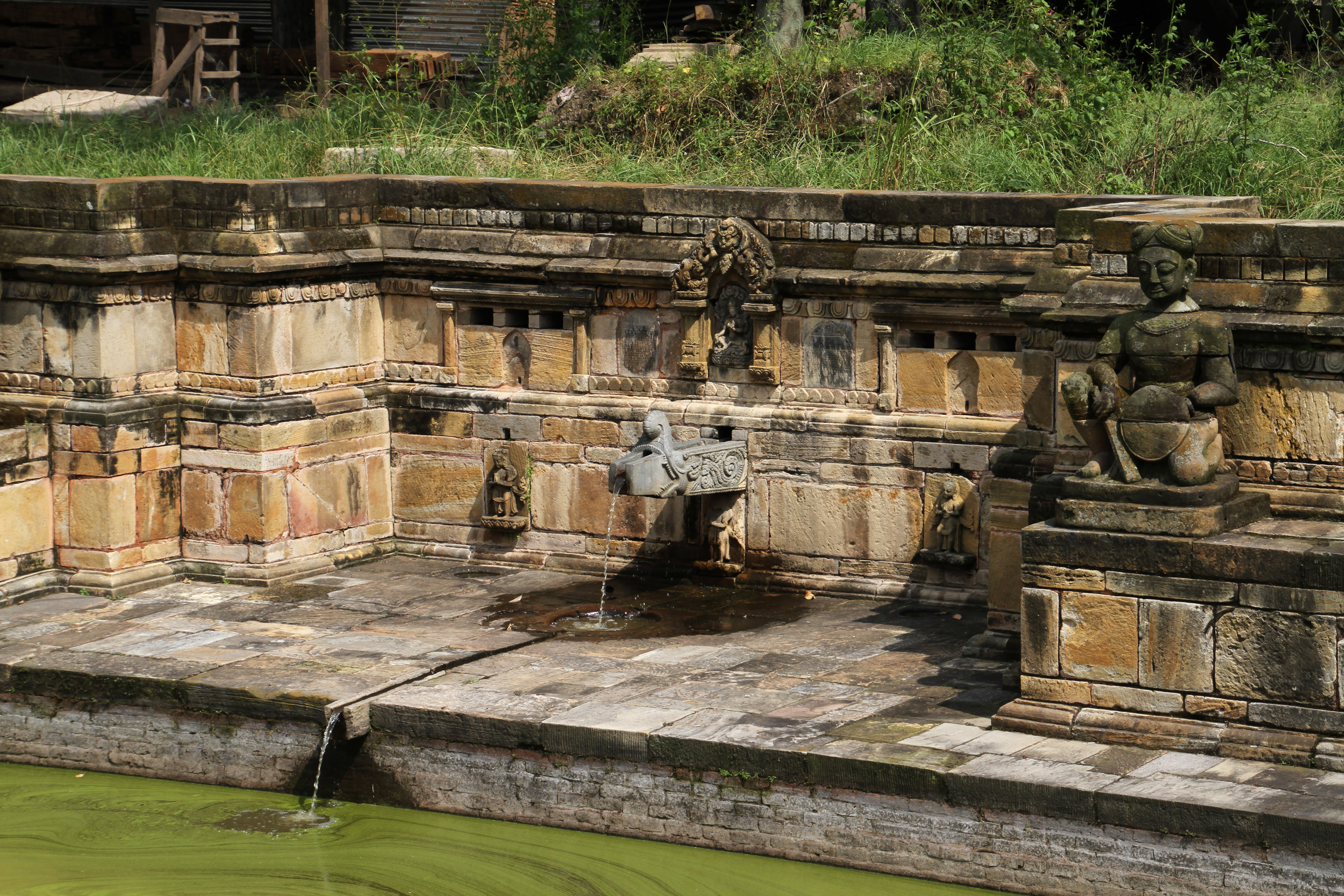
Water flowing from Bhandarkhal Hiti into the Bhandarkhal Pond in September 2015

At this time most of the original old pipeline towards Tusha Hiti is no longer used. Water from the Bhandarkhal Pond is pumped to the hiti through a new underground pipe and eventually still flows from Tusha Hiti back to the pond. Water is still channelled from the source to the Bhandarkhal Hiti through the restored 17th century, 820 metres (2,690 ft) long underground pipeline.

In spite of all the restoration efforts the water supply remains problematic. One of the causes is the demise of the Tikabhairav Canal, the royal canal that fed the ponds above the Naricha aquifer. The aquifer did receive enough water from rainfall and surface drainage at least until 2012, but the open spaces in that area of Patan that made this possible are disappearing.

The 2019 survey (see above) reports that there was no water flowing from Tusha Hiti. The same was reported in December 2024.

== Tusha Hiti in popular culture ==
A scene of the 1974 film Arabian Nights was shot in the courtyard of Sundari Chowk and the bath.

Tusha Hiti also doubled as the king's bath in the 1993 film Little Buddha.

== See also ==
- Alko Hiti
- Dhunge dhara
- Nagbahal Hiti
- Thanthu Darbar Hiti
- Tutedhara
