= Tutedhara =

Traditional water taps in Nepal

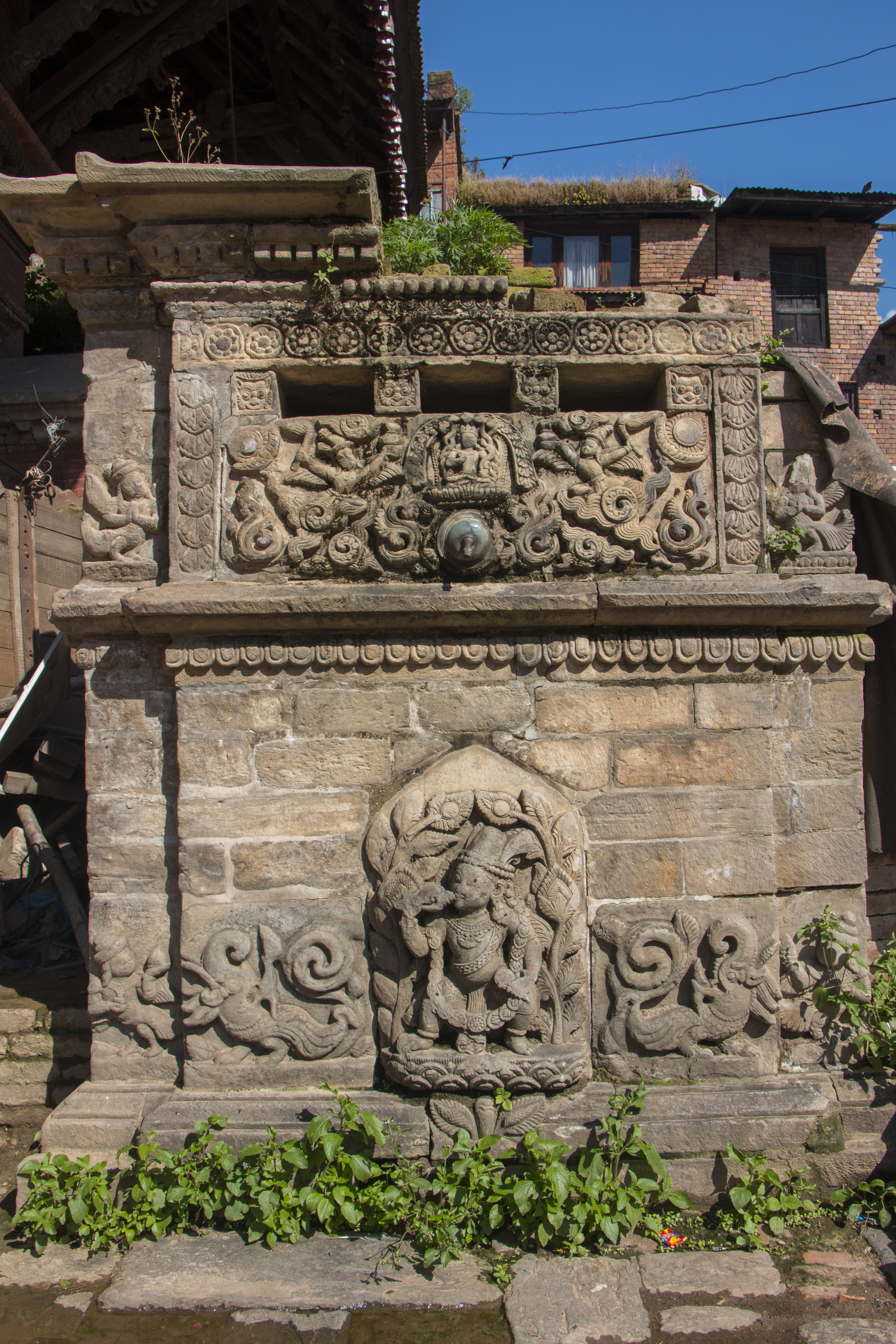
Jarun between Bhairavnath Temple and Betal Temple, Bhaktapur. During the 2015 earthquakes, the lid was damaged and the wall surrounding it collapsed.

A tutedhara (Nepali: टुटेधारा) or jahru (Newar: 𑐖𑐴𑑂𑐬𑐸) is a traditional drinking fountain found in Nepal. It is a water reservoir built out of stone with a tap that can be opened and closed. These structures are either free-standing or integrated into the wall of another building. They depend on a water well or a dhunge dhara to be filled. Only a few of them are in use today, but some of the stone parts have been put to other uses, and there are contemporary equivalents. The best known tutedhara is the one built into a wall in the royal palace on Kathmandu Durbar Square. It is inscribed with a poem dedicated to the goddess Durga, written in fifteen different languages.

== Etymology ==
The Nepali word tutedhara refers to the main feature of the drinking fountain: the tap that can be opened and closed. All the Newari names appear to be derived from the Sanskrit word jaladroni, meaning water bucket: jarun, jahru, jadhun, jaldroni, jaladhenu, jalancha. Jarunhiti combines this with hiti, a term used for that other ancient drinking fountain: the hiti or dhunge dhara.

== History ==
The construction of water conduits like hitis, dug wells and jahrus is considered a pious act in Nepal. This applies to kings and other dignitaries as well as to ordinary citizens.

What is known of the tutedhara comes from inscriptions that can sometimes be found on the stone. These do not always describe its creation, but some other dated event, indicating that the tutedhara would have already been in existence at that time. Such inscriptions have been found with dates up to the middle of the 19th century.

One jahru in Khapinchhe in Patan shows an inscription dated 530 AD. This is believed to be the oldest jahru in Nepal. In Bhaktapur, the oldest jahru is dated 1175 AD.

One of the oldest known inscriptions in the Newar language (1232 AD) is an inscription on a tutedhara.

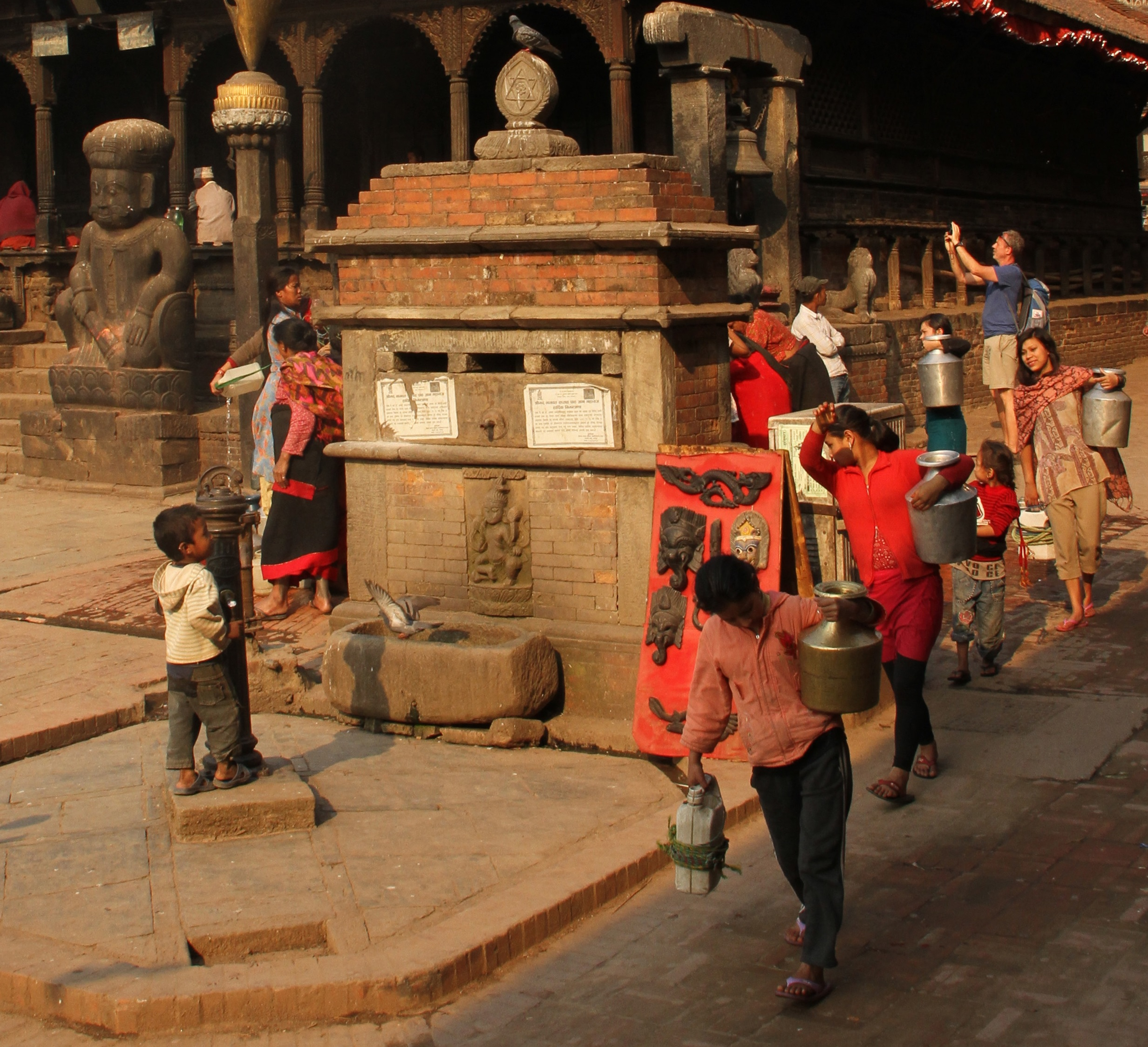
Freestanding jahru on the Dattatreya Square in Bhaktapur

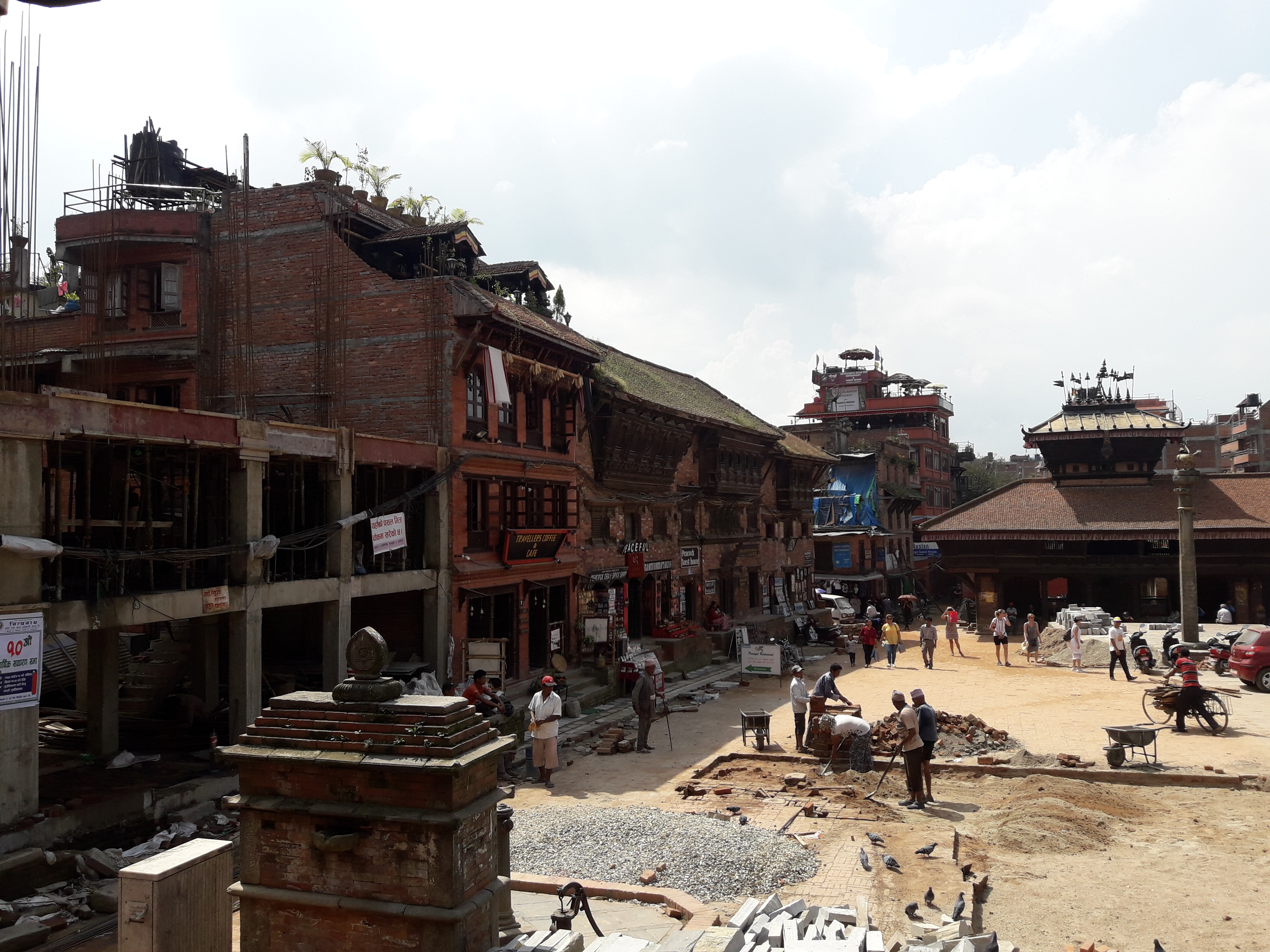
View of Dattatreya Square with the back of the jahru (with funnel) on the left

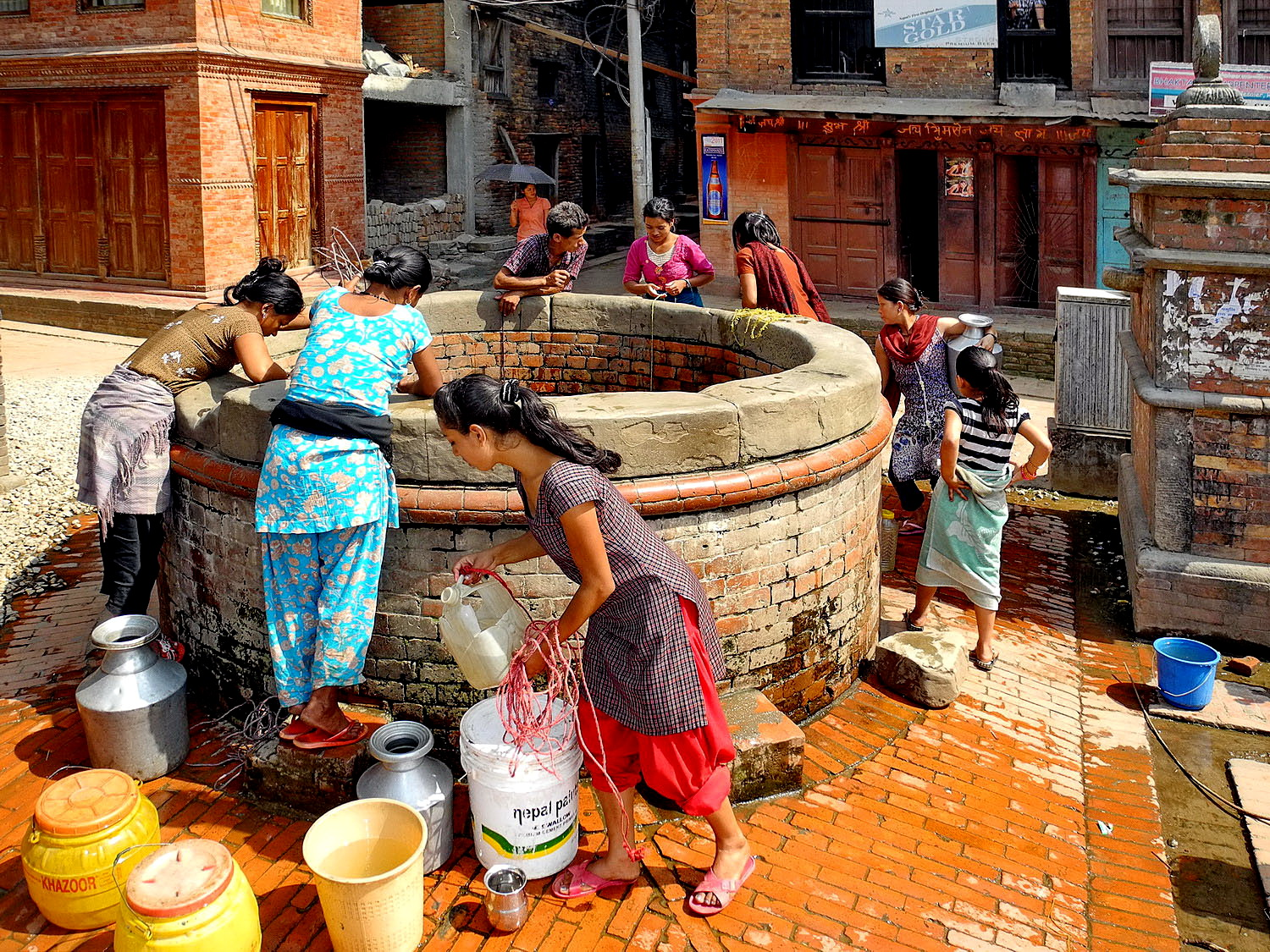
The well that was used to fill the jahru (seen on the right) in the past

Only in the city of Patan has there been a comprehensive survey of all the tutedharas. A total of 106 of them have been found. A few of these had been kept operational in the traditional way and two were connected to the municipal water supply.

== Architecture ==
A tutedhara consists of (from the bottom to the top):

- a rectangular stone base;
- a rectangular pedestal made of stone or brick;
- a stone tank that can contain around 20 litres of water. On the back or the side of the tank there is a funnel to fill it. In the lower part of the tank on the front one or more spouts can be seen. The spouts can be opened or closed using a stopper;
- usually a lid made of stone or brick, sometimes with ornaments similar to the roof of a small temple.

The front of the tank is sometimes decorated with symbols connected to water, like makaras, snakes and kalashas (water pots). These decorations can either be sculptures or paintings. Below the spouts, there is almost always a relief depicting Bhagiratha, the mythical sage whose efforts helped bring the waters of the Ganges to earth.

The sizes of the stone tanks vary considerably. The largest tank in Patan can hold 2,200 litres.

== Types ==
There are three main types of jahrus:

- freestanding jahrus
- jahrus connected to or integrated into the wall of another building, like a dharmasala (shelter or public resthouse), a monastery, a house or a gate
- jahrus integrated into a dhunge dhara

The first two types of jahru depend on an external source to be filled, so they are always found in the vicinity of a dhunge dhara or a well. Often, they are also close to a shelter of some kind, if they are not actually built into one. Freestanding jahrus are sometimes found in succession on important routes in the Kathmandu Valley. The way from Lele Village to Patan is an example of such a route.

Traditionally, filling and cleaning the tutedharas was the work of the surrounding community, sometimes organised into a guthi (local community group dedicated to certain tasks), or the owner of the building the jahru was built into. Filling was done daily or as often as the tank would run dry.

Maintenance would be done during special days, like Naga Panchami, Newar New Year and Sithi Nakha. Sithi Nakha is the day still used to clean water sources like wells, ponds, hitis and tutedharas.

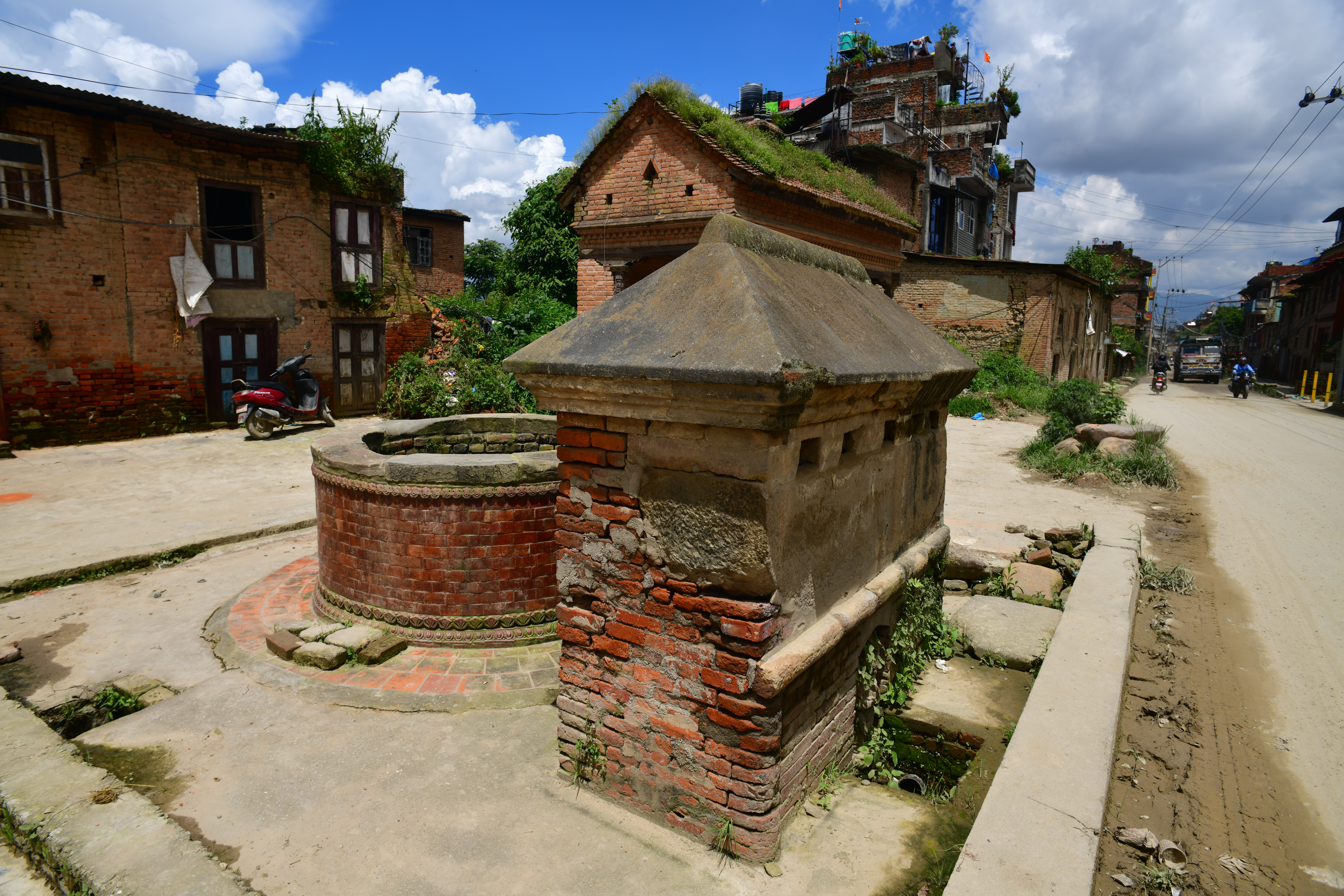
Jahru and nearby well in Sunakothi, Lalitpur District. The roof of a shelter can be seen in the background

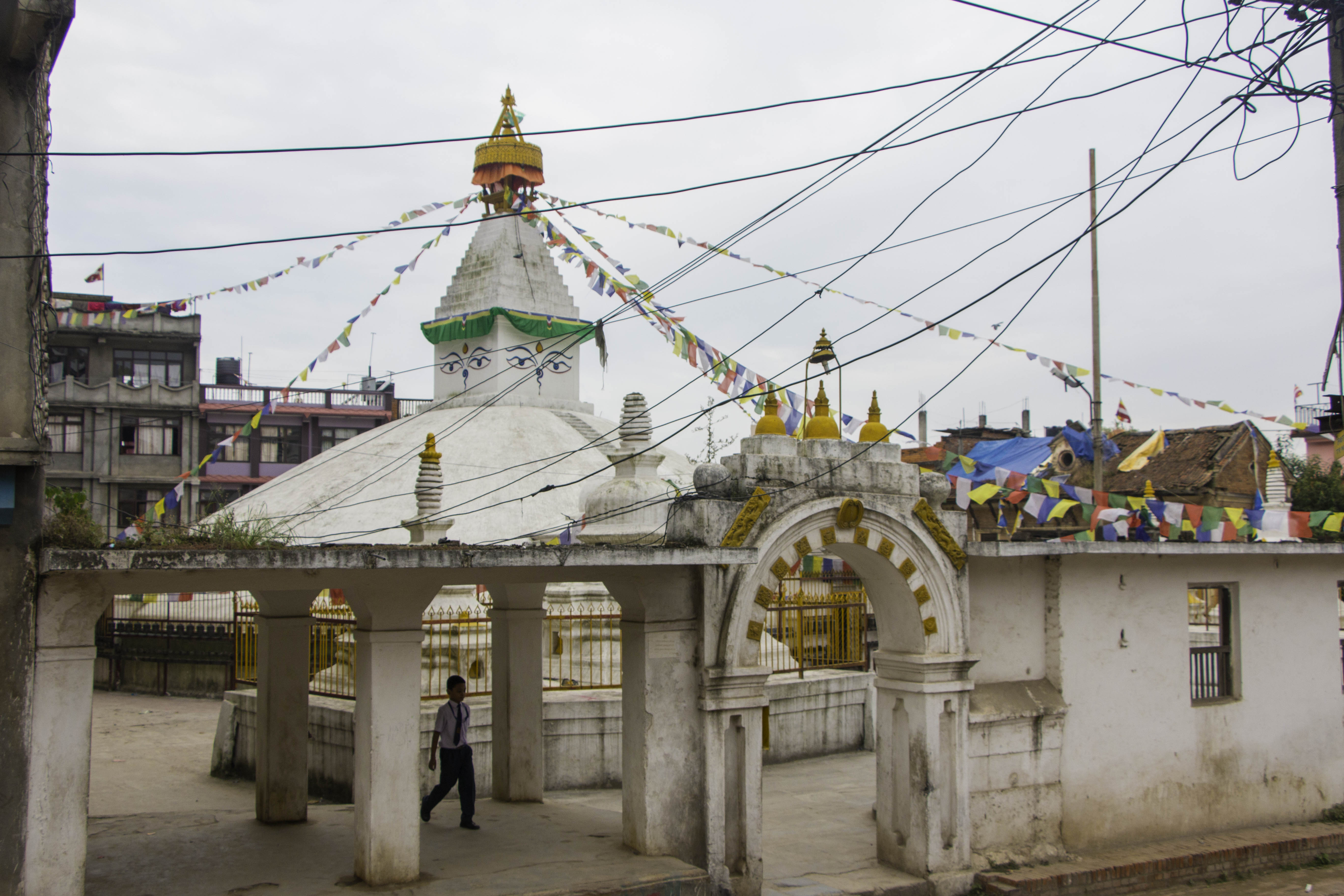
Gate to the Northern Ashok Stupa in Patan, with a built-in jahru on the right of the arch

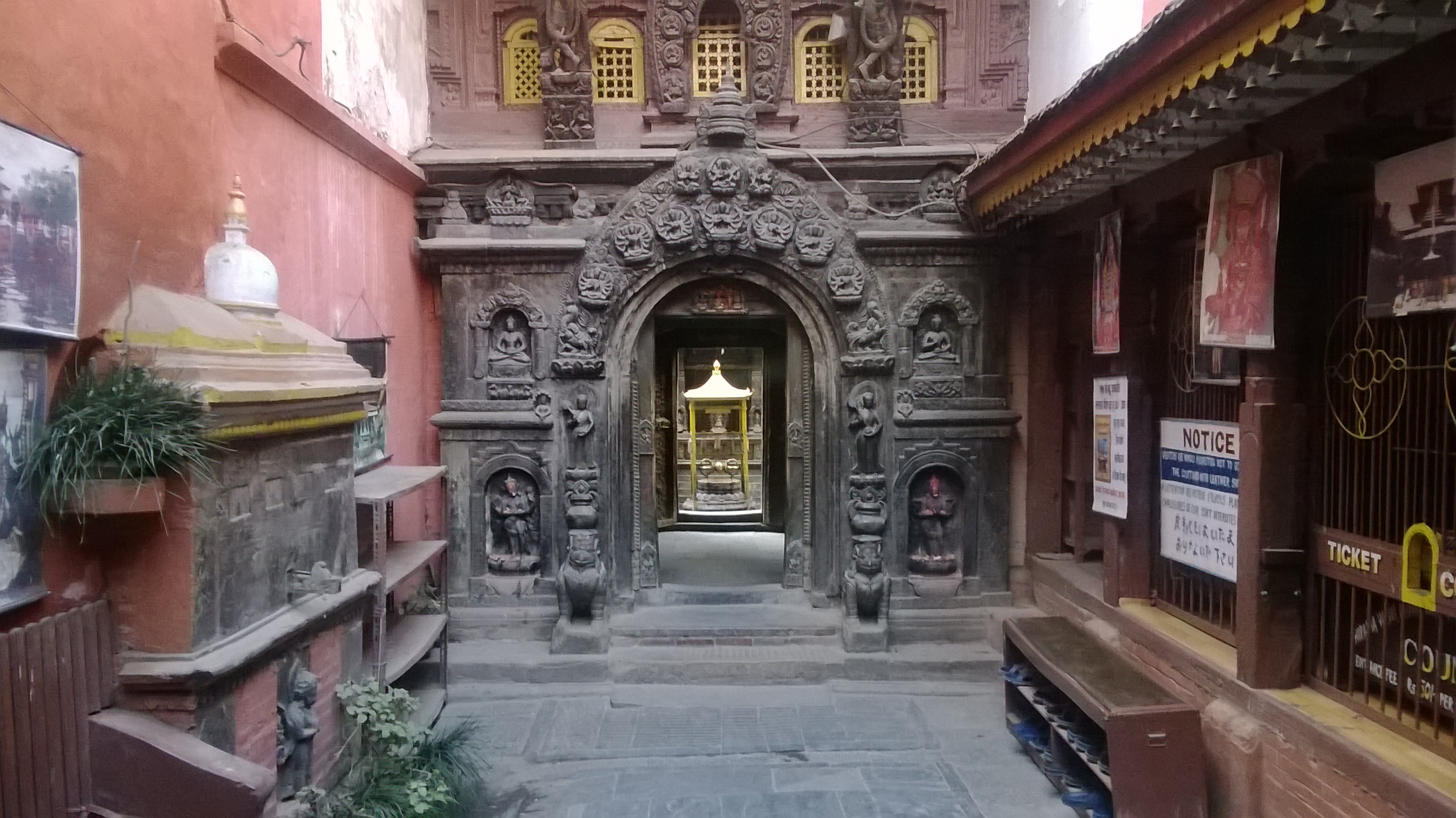
Entrance gate to the Golden Temple in Patan, with a jahru on the left

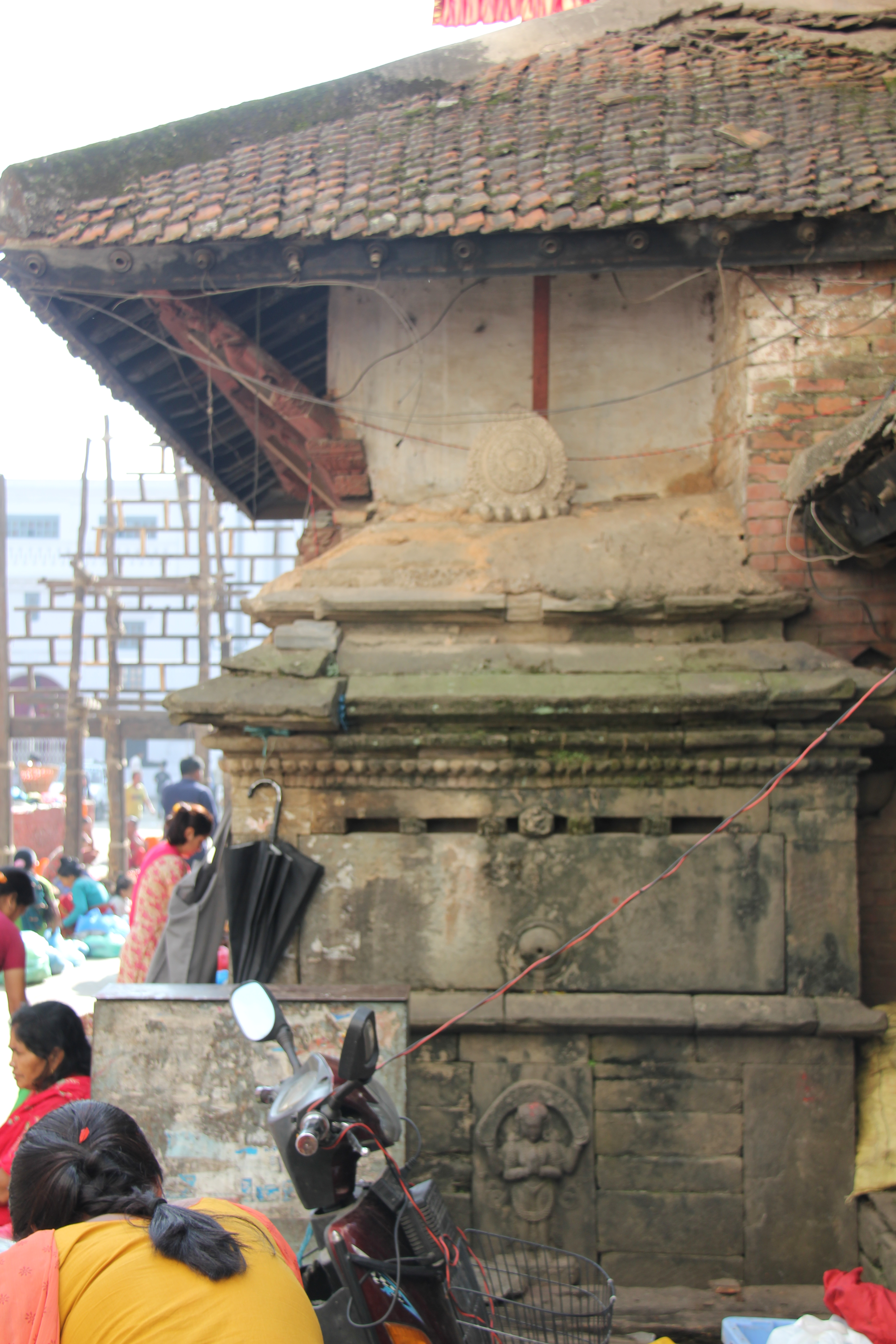
Jahru at Lakshmi Narayan Sattal in Kathmandu

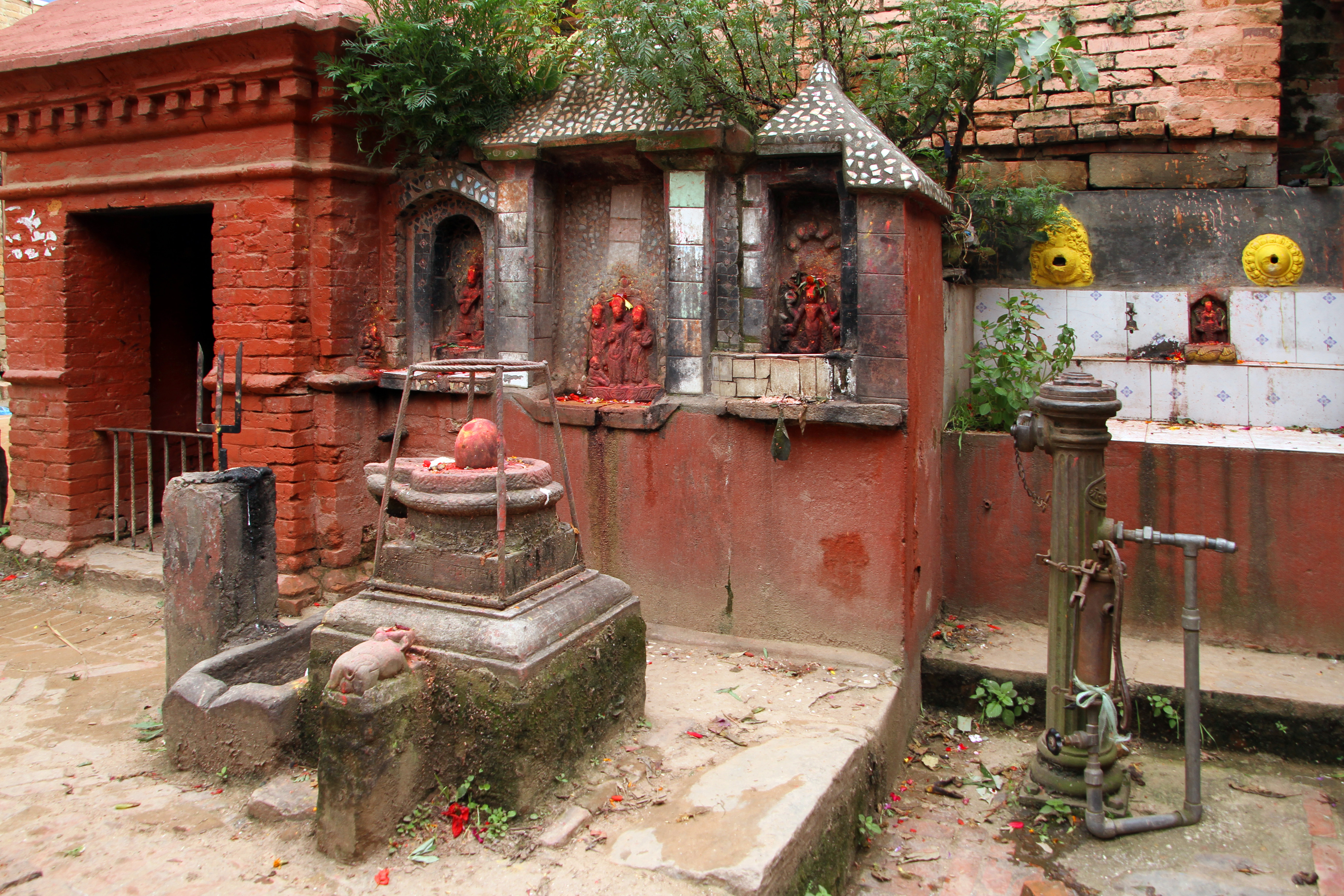
Some shrines in Bhaktapur with a disused jahru with two yellow spouts on the right. A well and a shelter are close by

The third type of jahru does not need to be filled manually; the tank is filled by excess water that flows into the dhunge dhara. Cleaning and maintenance would likely be combined with the work on the hiti as a whole.

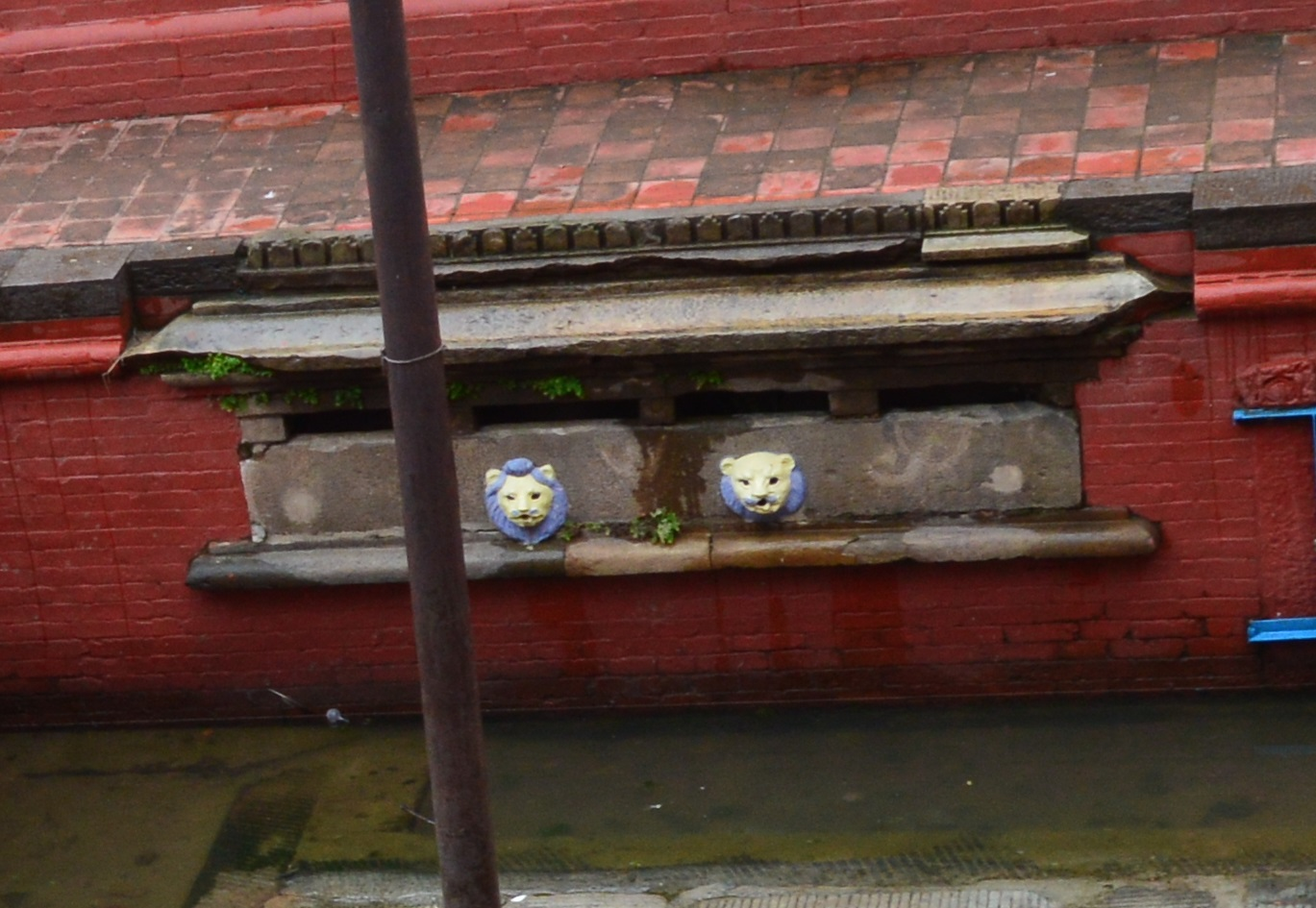
Jahru of Nagbahal Hiti in Patan. The two spouts have the shape of a male and a female lion

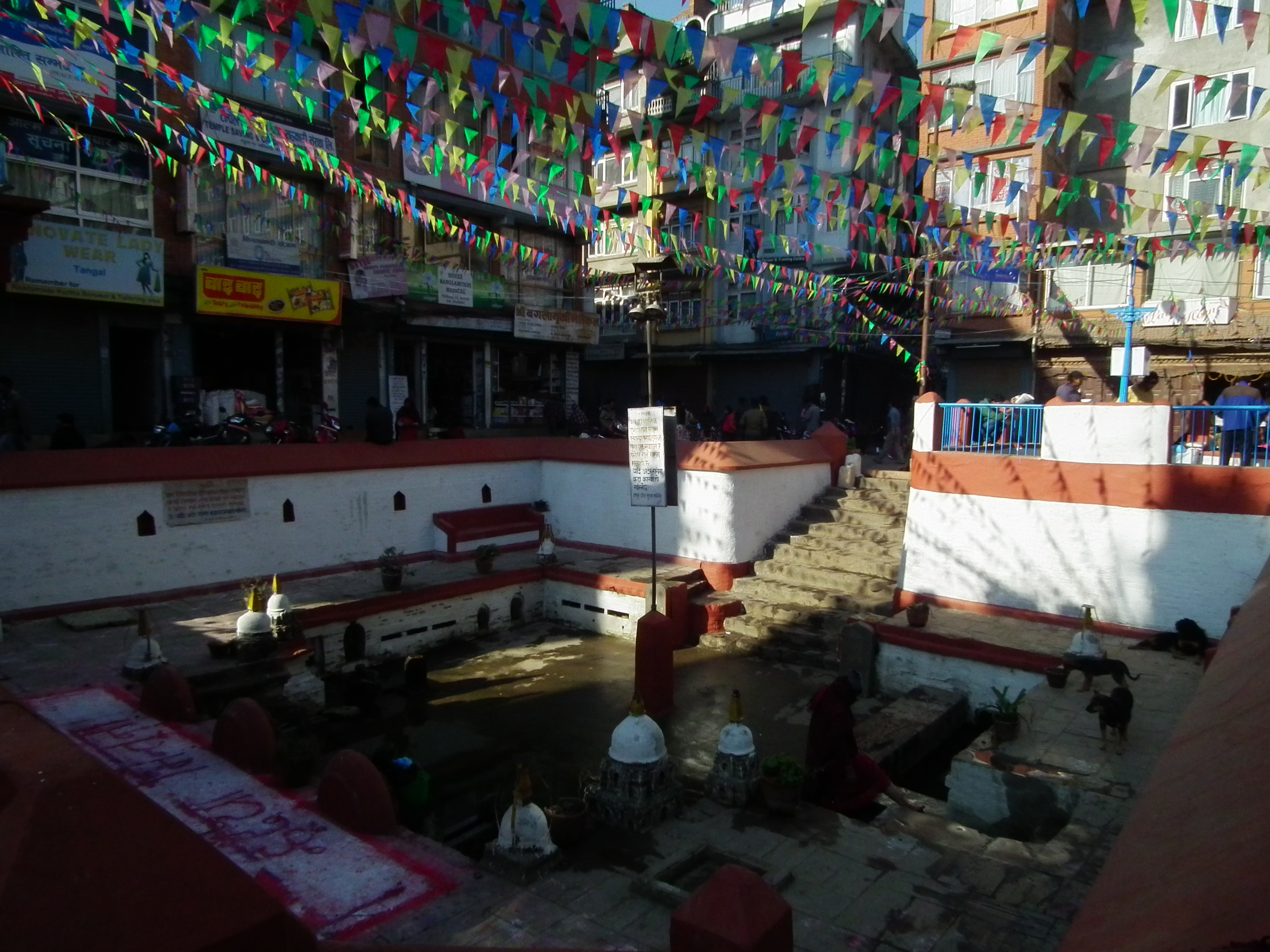
Two jahrus can be seen in the walls of Tanga Hiti in Patan

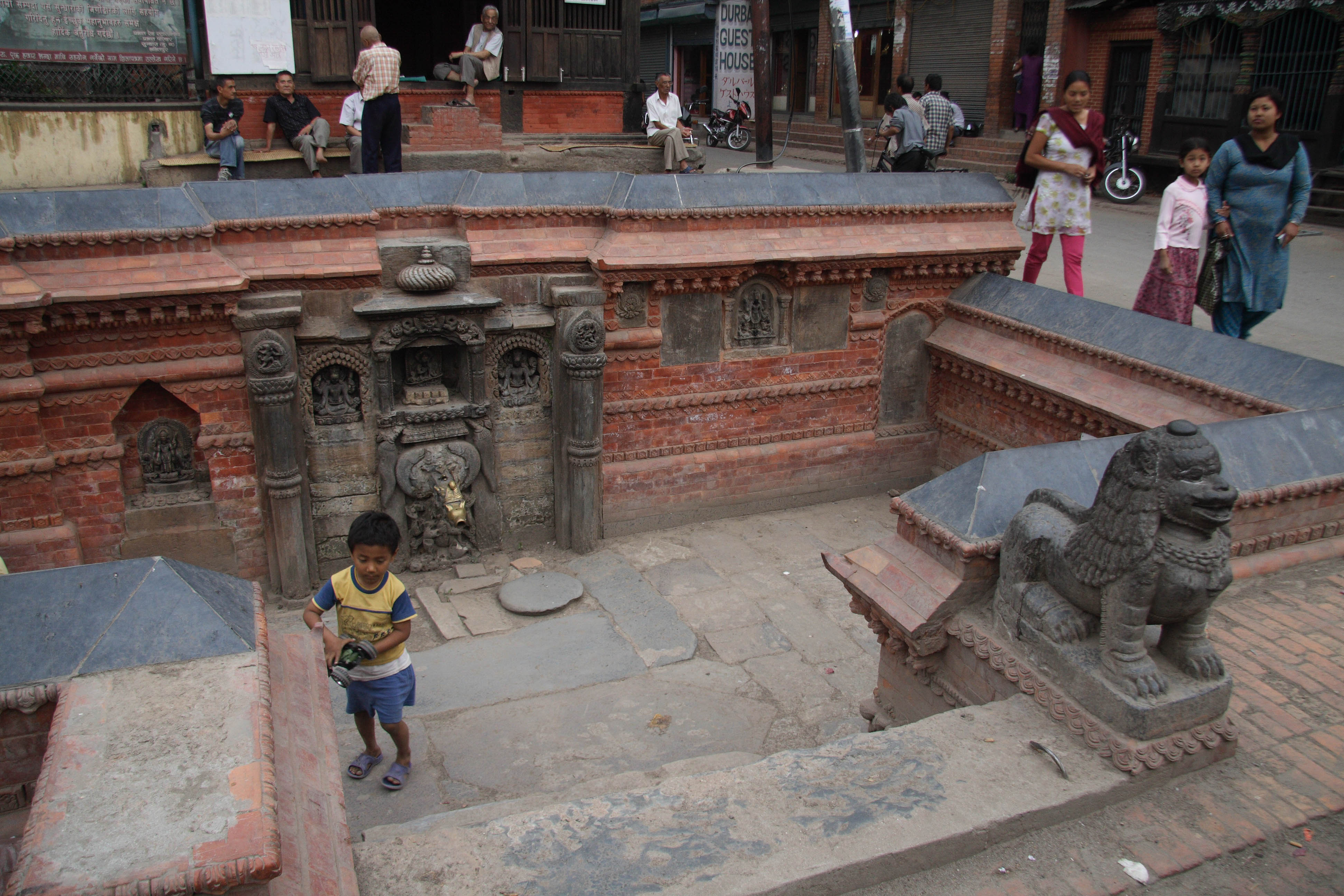
Sundhara in Patan. On the right side of the spout is the jahru

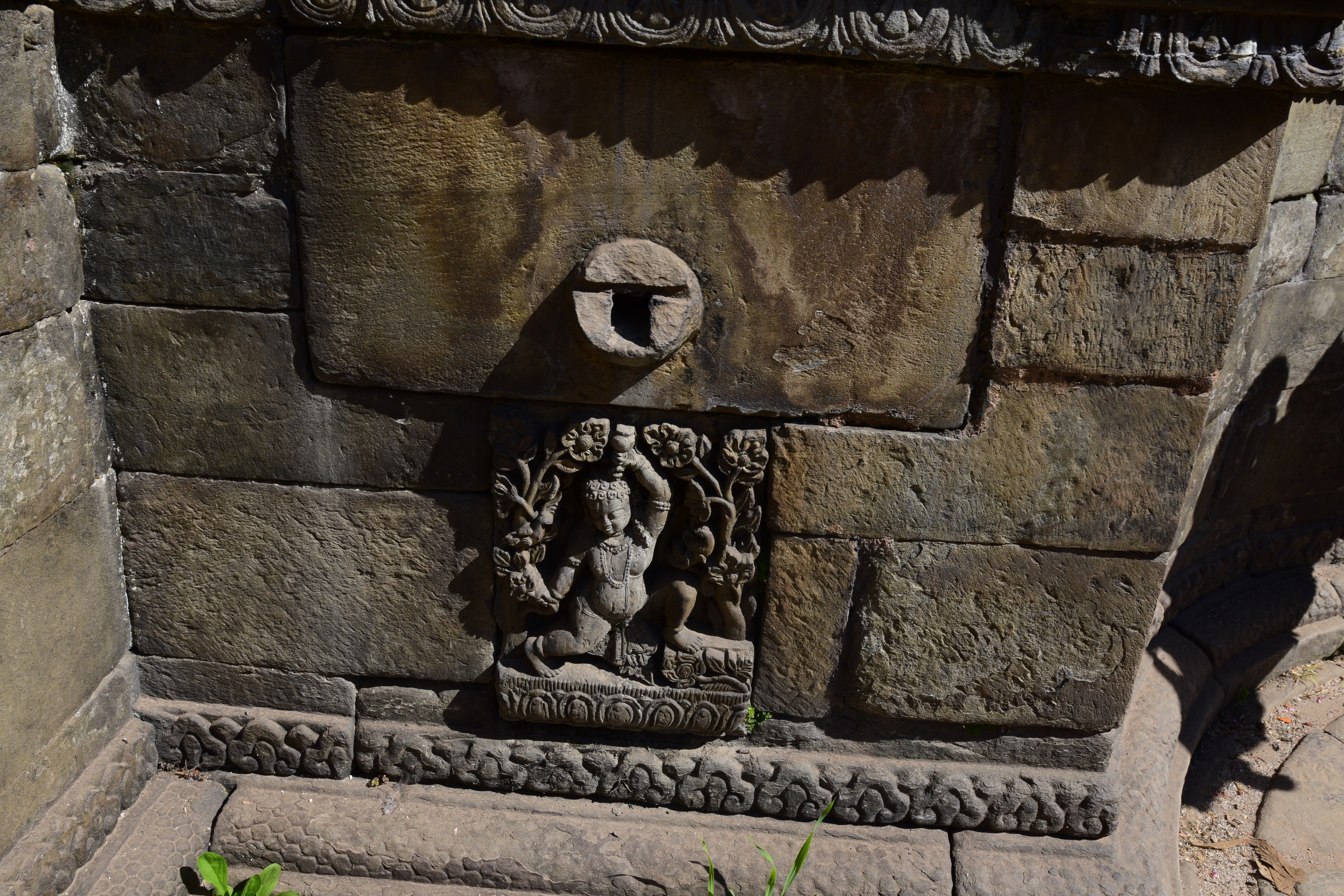
One of the two jahrus of Thanthu Darbar Hiti in Bhaktapur, with Bhagiratha beneath the spout

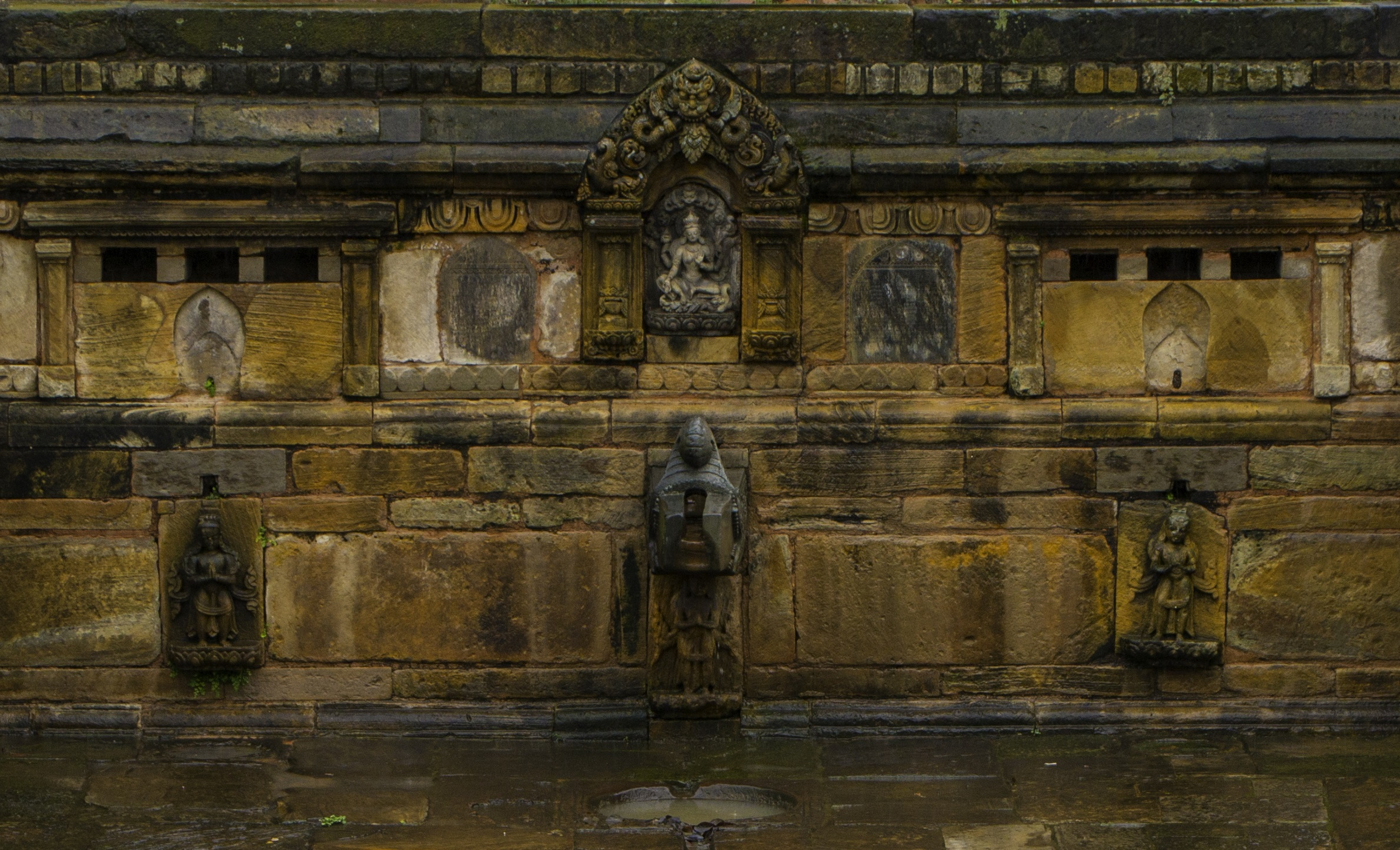
Two jahrus on either side of the stone spout at Bhandarkhal Pokhari in Patan

== Royal inscriptions ==
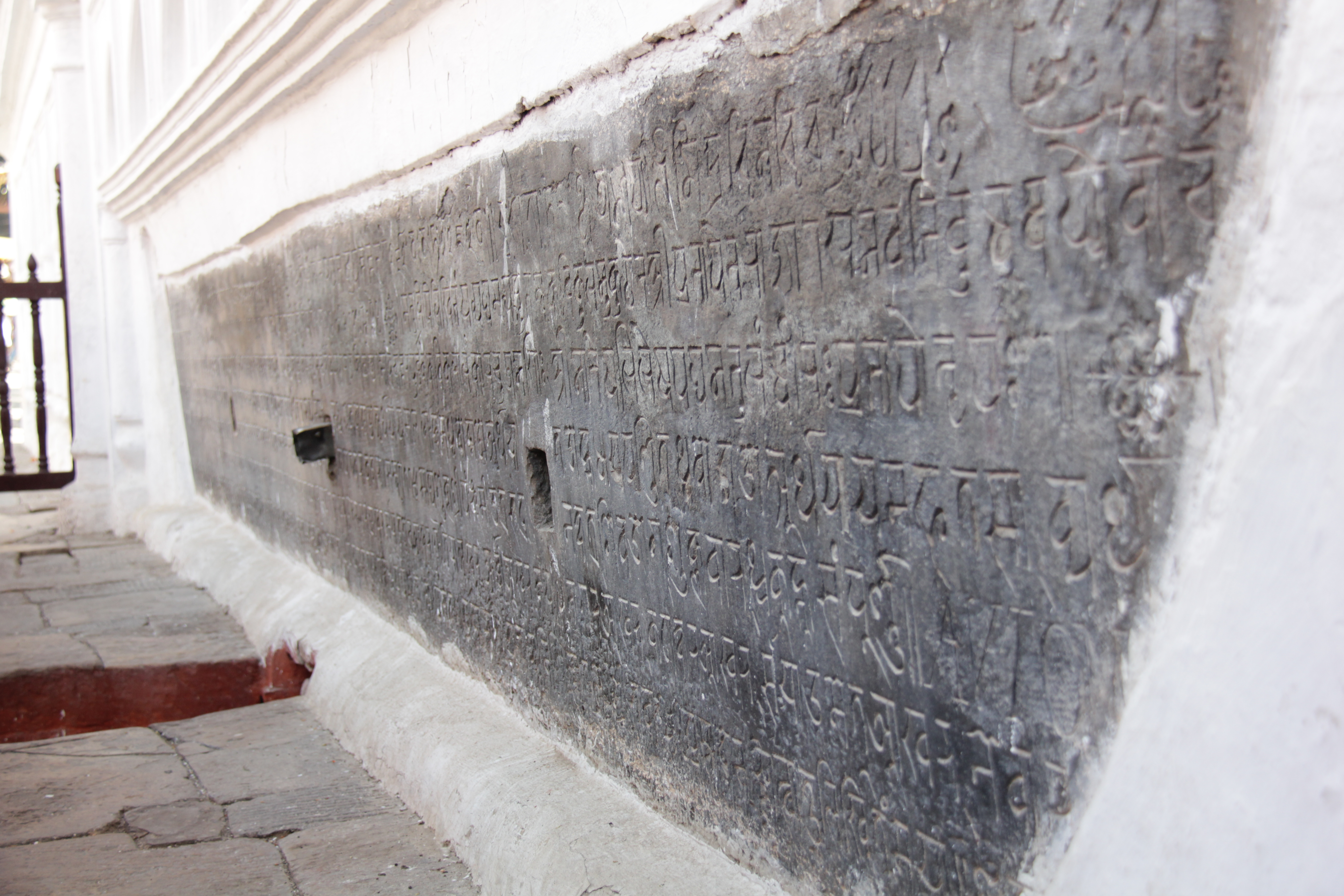
Royal tutedhara with inscriptions in 15 languages. The holes in the stone reveal its former function as a drinking fountain.

The best known jahru is the one that was built into the white wall of the old royal palace on Kathmandu Durbar Square at Sundari Chowk. Sundari Chowk is one of the palace courtyards with a water spout. The reservoir would be filled with water from the spout through holes that could be accessed from the inside of the courtyard. The water could be tapped from the outer wall.

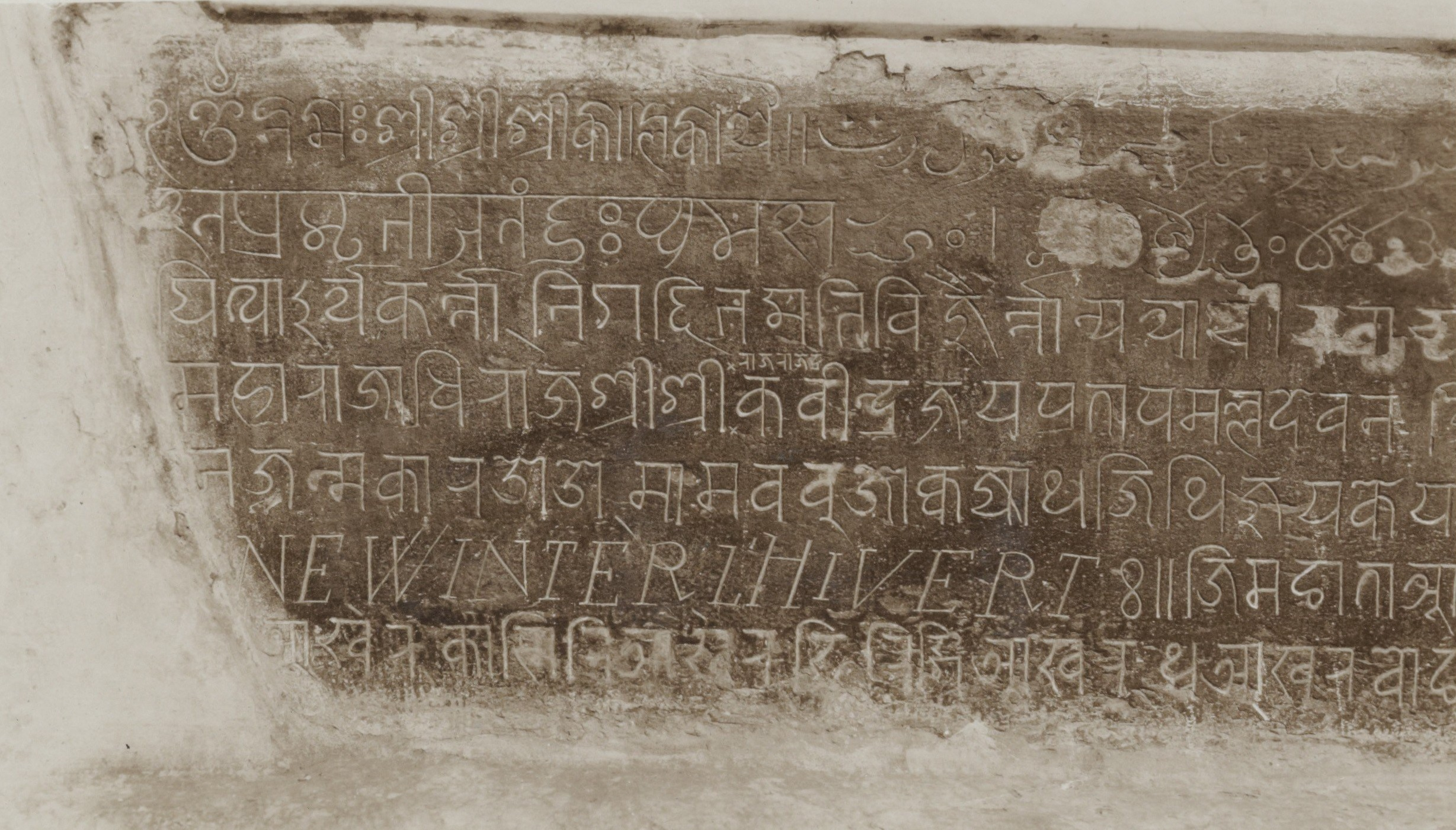
Corner of royal tutedhara with European texts. The beginning of the word AVTOMNE is on the other side.

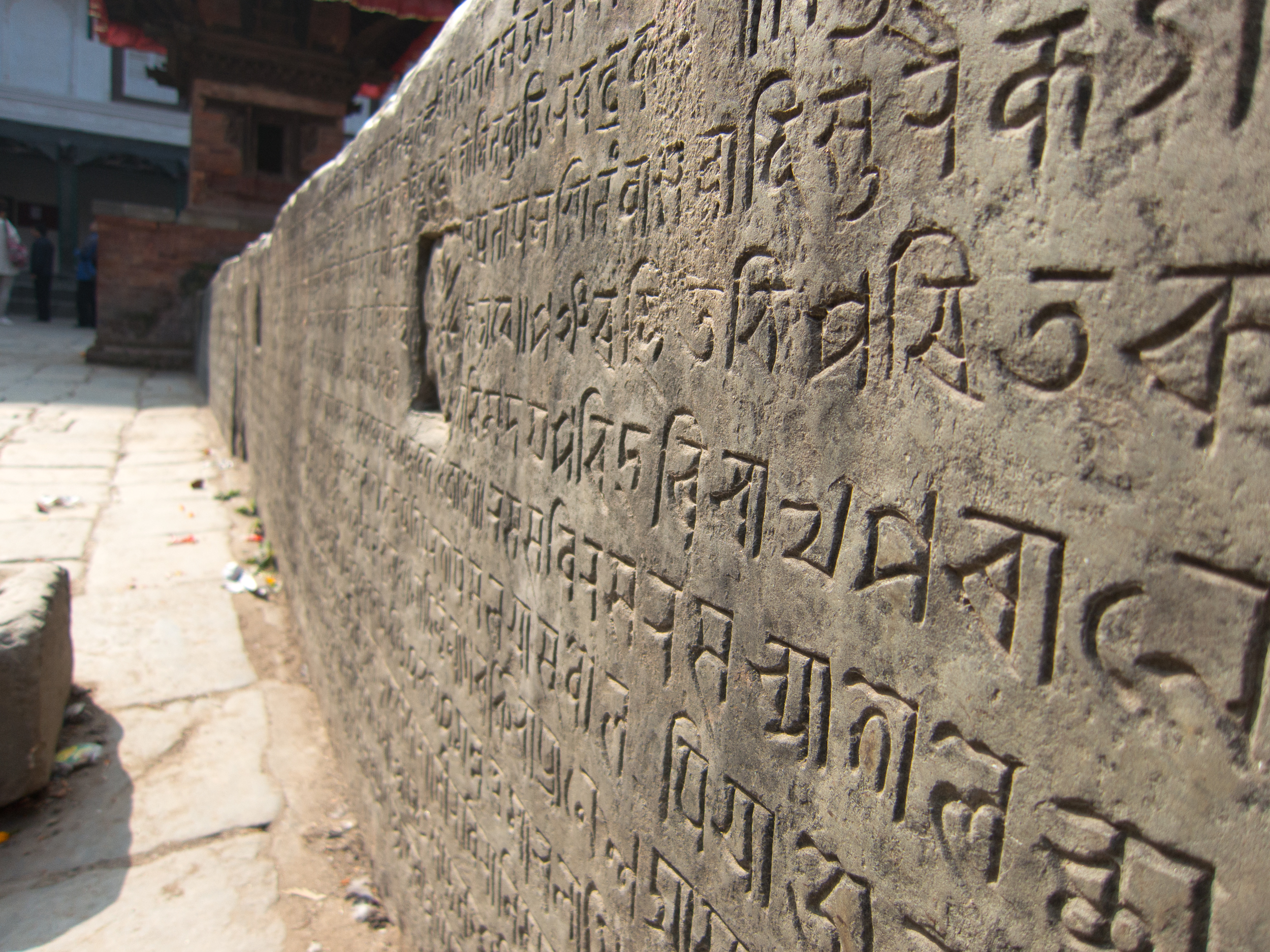
Inscriptions on the steps of the Jagannath Temple. The square hole reveals the former function of the stone.

Father Giuseppe, an Italian Capuchin missionary, Prefect of the Roman Mission, described the jahru in 1799 in his "Account of the Kingdom of Nepal":

In a wall of the royal palace of Cat'hmandu, which is built upon the court before the palace, there is a great stone of a single piece, which is about fifteen feet long, and four or five feet thick: on the top of this great stone there are four square holes at equal distances from each other. In the inside of the wall they pour water into the holes, and in the courtside, each hole having a closed canal, every person may draw water to drink. At the foot of the stone is a large ladder, by which people ascend to drink.

On the outside, the stone is inscribed in 15 different languages, including Nepali, Persian, French, Greek and Arabic. King Pratap Malla (1624-1674 AD), renowned for his linguistic abilities, set up this inscription in 1654. From the end of the 5th to the beginning of the 6th line the inscription reads: AVTOMNE WINTER L'HIVERT (French for autumn, Dutch, English or German for winter and French for winter). According to legend, people who could understand the verse would receive milk, instead of water, from the tutedhara. According to another popular belief, a large treasure is hidden beneath the palace and the key to obtaining this treasure is hidden in the inscription.

Close by, there are more tutedharas inscribed by Pratap Malla. These were already out of commission by 1654: eight stone tanks were used as steps to the Jagannath Temple. These too carry poetry dedicated to Durga.

== Present state ==
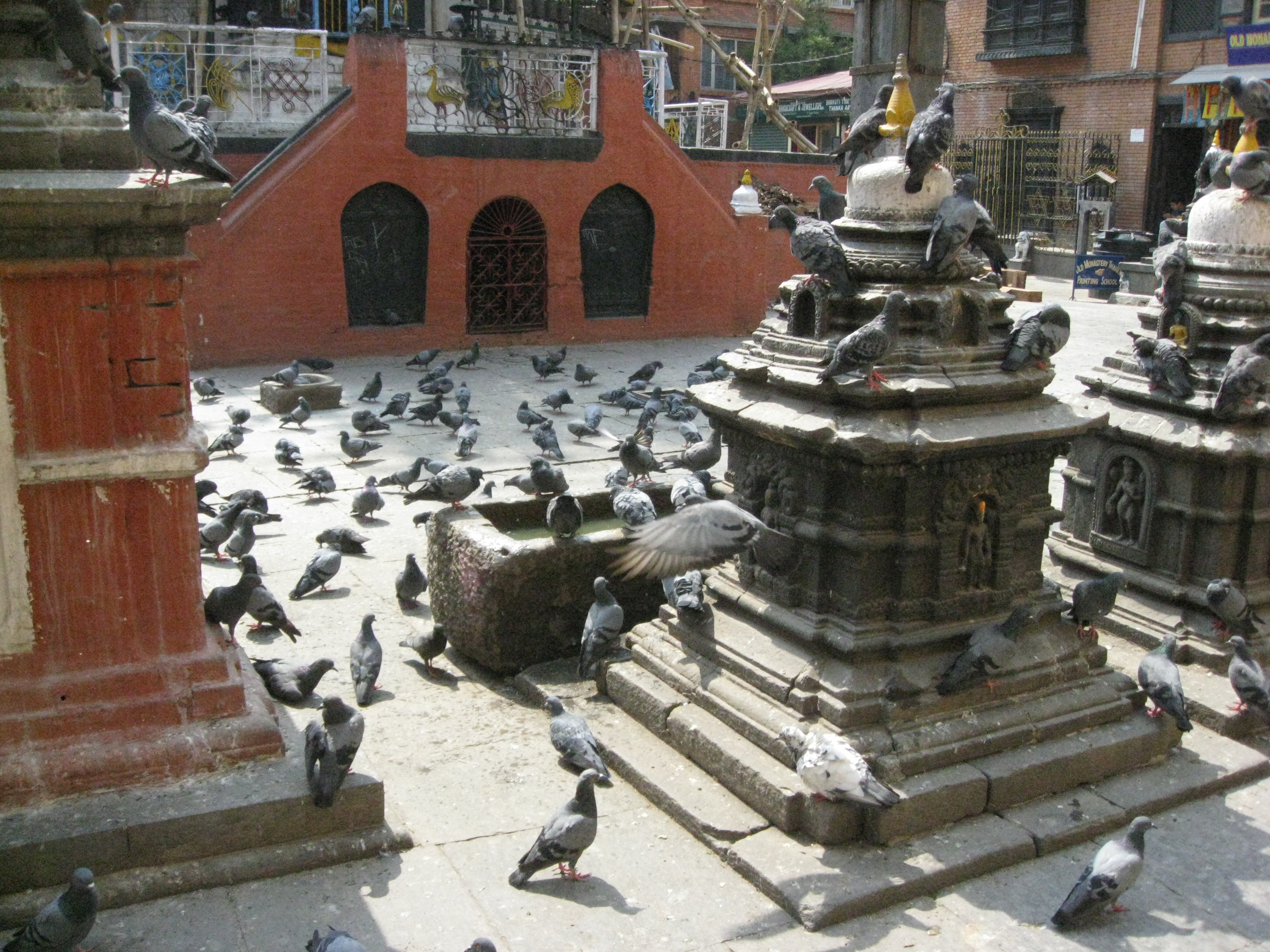
Pigeons at a jahru near Kathesimbhu Stupa in Kathmandu

Since the arrival of modern, piped water systems, starting in the late 19th century, most communities began to lose interest in their old drinking fountains, although, in Patan at least, many jahrus have been kept alive until far into the 20th century. Apart from a few exceptions, the jahrus and their function are now all but forgotten.

Some jahrus were destroyed to make room for other buildings, but many of the solid stone tanks have been put to other uses. Kathmandu's Jagannath Temple is not the only place where old tanks are used as steps. The secondary stone steps on the north side of Krishna Mandir in Patan contain one old jahru among the stones, for example. One of the temples in the Kumbheshwar temple complex also has an old jahru as a stepping stone.

Some of the old tanks function as a bench, a planter, a dustbin or a trough. In Patan, two are used for the pigeons on Durbar Square. Something similar can be seen in Kathmandu.

== Modern replacements ==
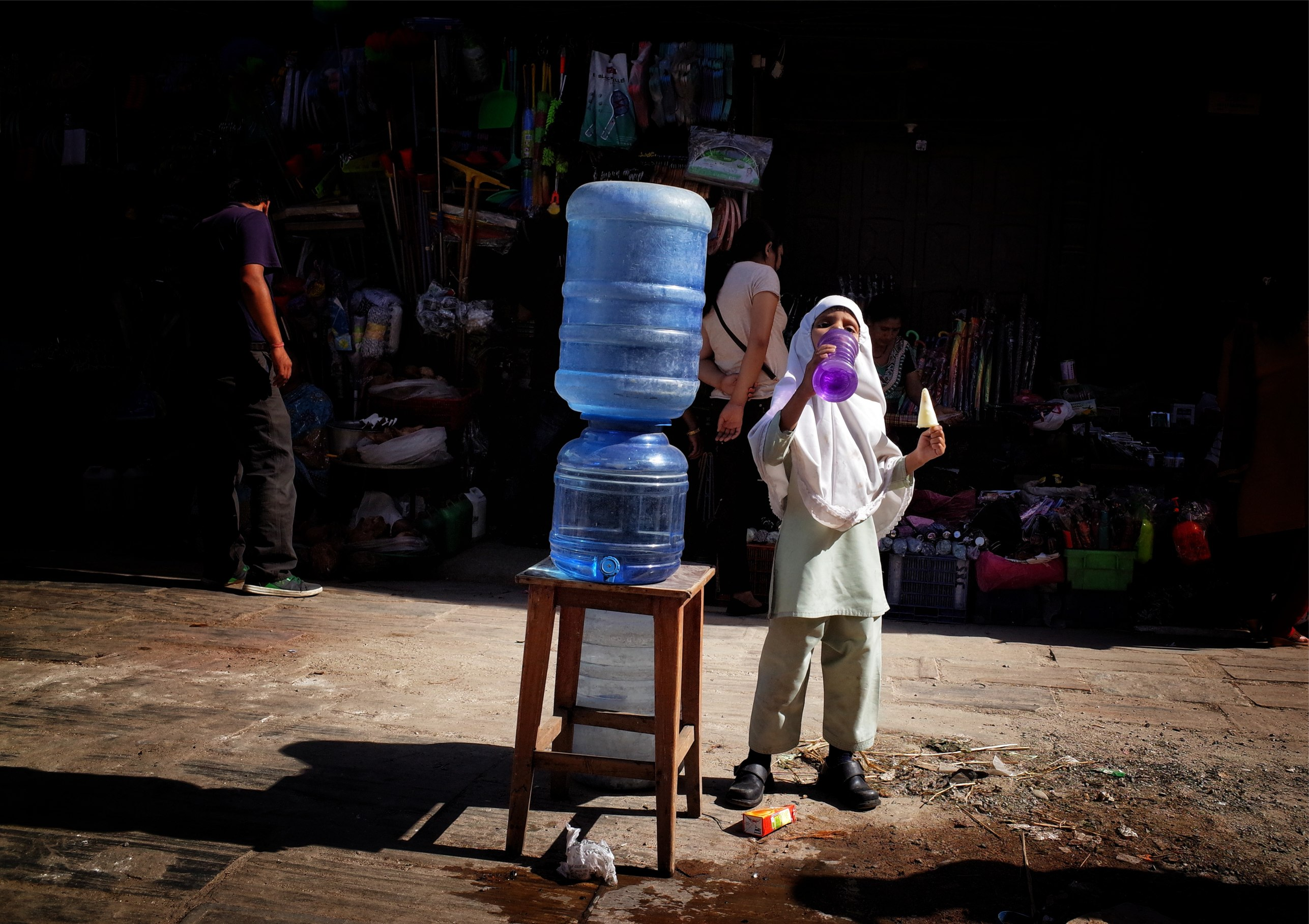
Water dispenser somewhere in Nepal

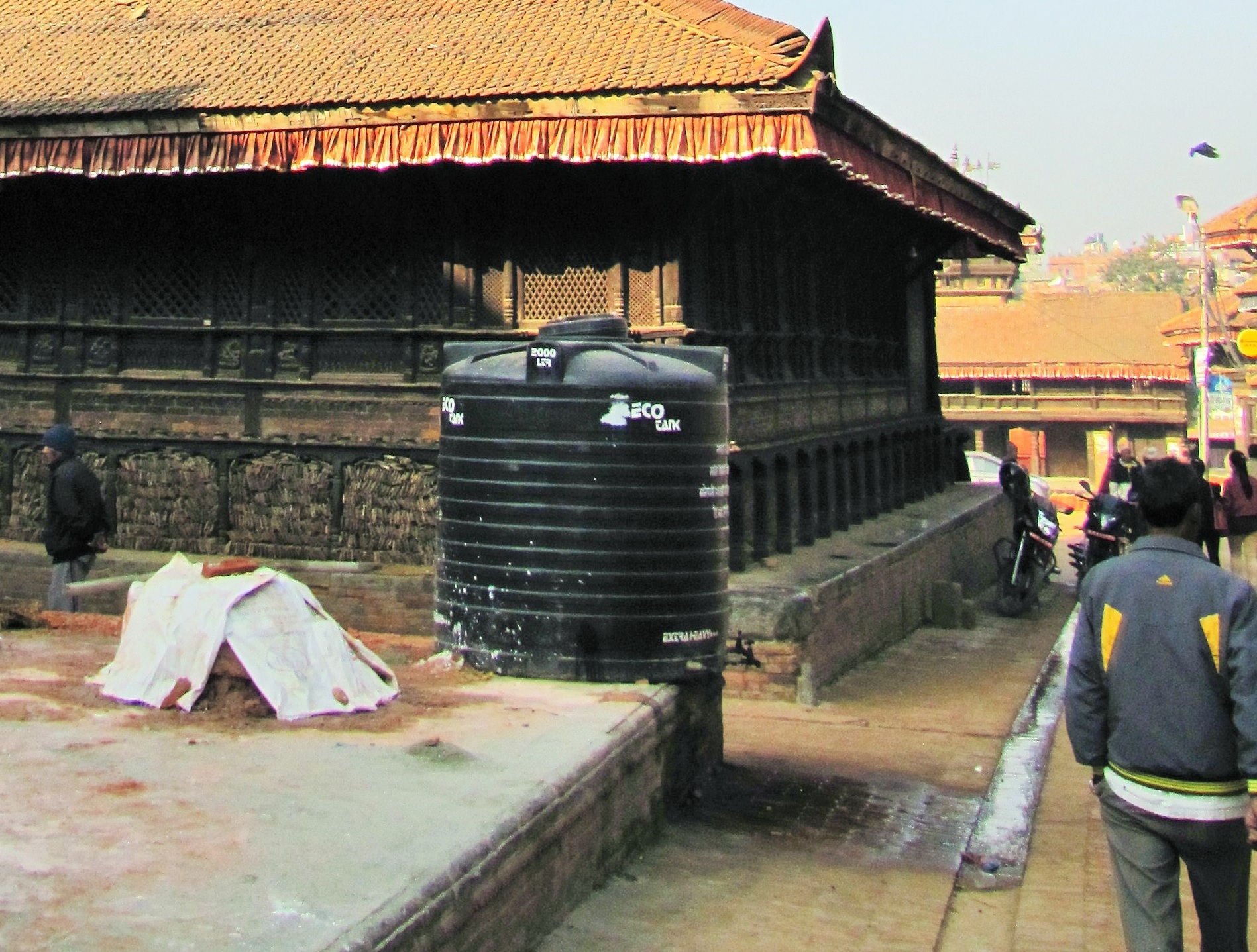
2,000-litre water tank with taps in Bhaktapur

Although most jahrus may have lost their function, leaving only the stone remnants to posterity, new structures are taking their place: plastic water dispensers of different sizes, to be used by passersby. In Tripureswar, Kathmandu there is at least one case where not only the function but also the spirit of the jahru has been revived: the water is being given away for free.

=== Water ATMs ===
In March 2019, the city of Lalitpur installed a "water ATM" outside its office building. From this machine, people can buy small quantities (200 ml or 1 litre) of safe drinking water. This sparked a debate about whether or not drinking water should be available free of charge, as is tradition in Nepal. At the beginning of 2020, the Kathmandu Valley Water Supply Management Board was planning to install 15 more water ATMs in busy places in the Kathmandu Valley, including some of the heritage sites. One of the stated aims was to reduce the use of plastic water bottles.

== See also ==
- Dhunge dhara
- Water dispenser
