= Thanthu Darbar Hiti =

17th century royal bath in Bhaktapur, Nepal

Coordinates: 27°40′21.5″N 85°25′43.3″E

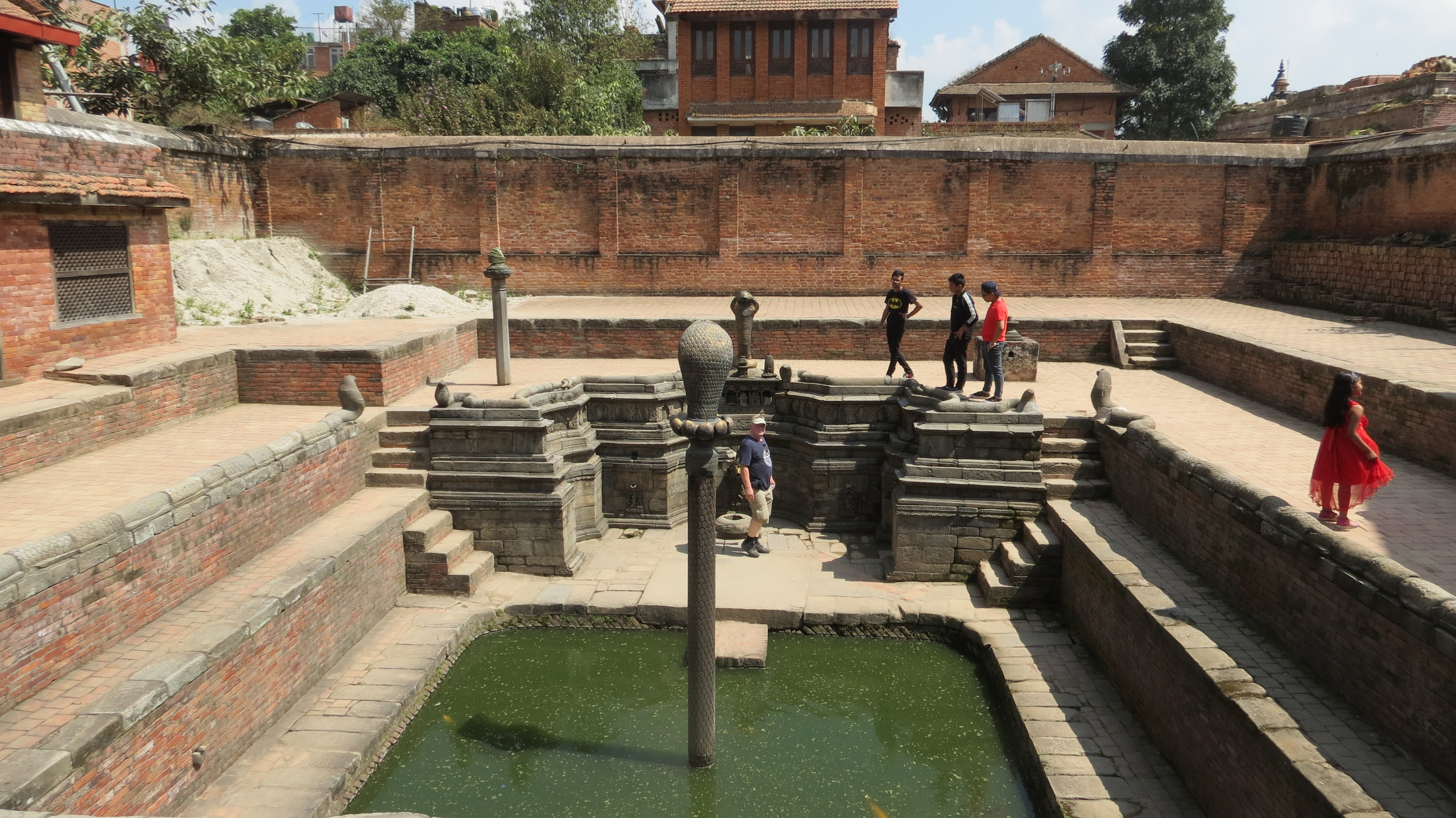
- Thanthu Darbar Hiti in 2018
- Alternative names: Nag Pokhari, Duguhiti

General information
- Location: Bhaktapur Durbar Square, Bhaktapur, Nepal

The Thanthu Darbar Hiti, Thanthun Lu Hiti or Nag Pokhari, also known as Duguhiti, is a sunken bath used by the Malla royal family in Nepal. It is in a courtyard of Bhaktapur Durbar Square, Bhaktapur. King Jitamitra Malla is credited with building the bath in the 17th century. It was once part of the Thanthu Layaku palace. Its golden spout originally received water from the foothills of the Kathmandu Valley, but is now connected to the municipal water supply.

== Etymology ==
The words Thanthu and Thanthun are derived from the location of the hiti inside the Thanthu Layaku palace. Darbar comes from the Persian darbar, meaning 'court' or 'palace'.

Lu Hiti refers to the presence of the golden spout (see below). Lu means golden and hiti means spout in the Newar language (Nepal Bhasa). Sundhara is the translation in Nepali and is also sometimes used as a name for the hiti. Duguhiti also refers to a characteristic of the spout: It features the head and front legs of a goat, dugucha in Nepal Bhasa.

Nag Pokhari refers to another feature of the hiti, namely the abundance of snake (Nāga) sculptures and especially the pole in the middle of the pond. Pokhari is the Nepali word for reservoir and indicates the presence of the pond.

== History ==
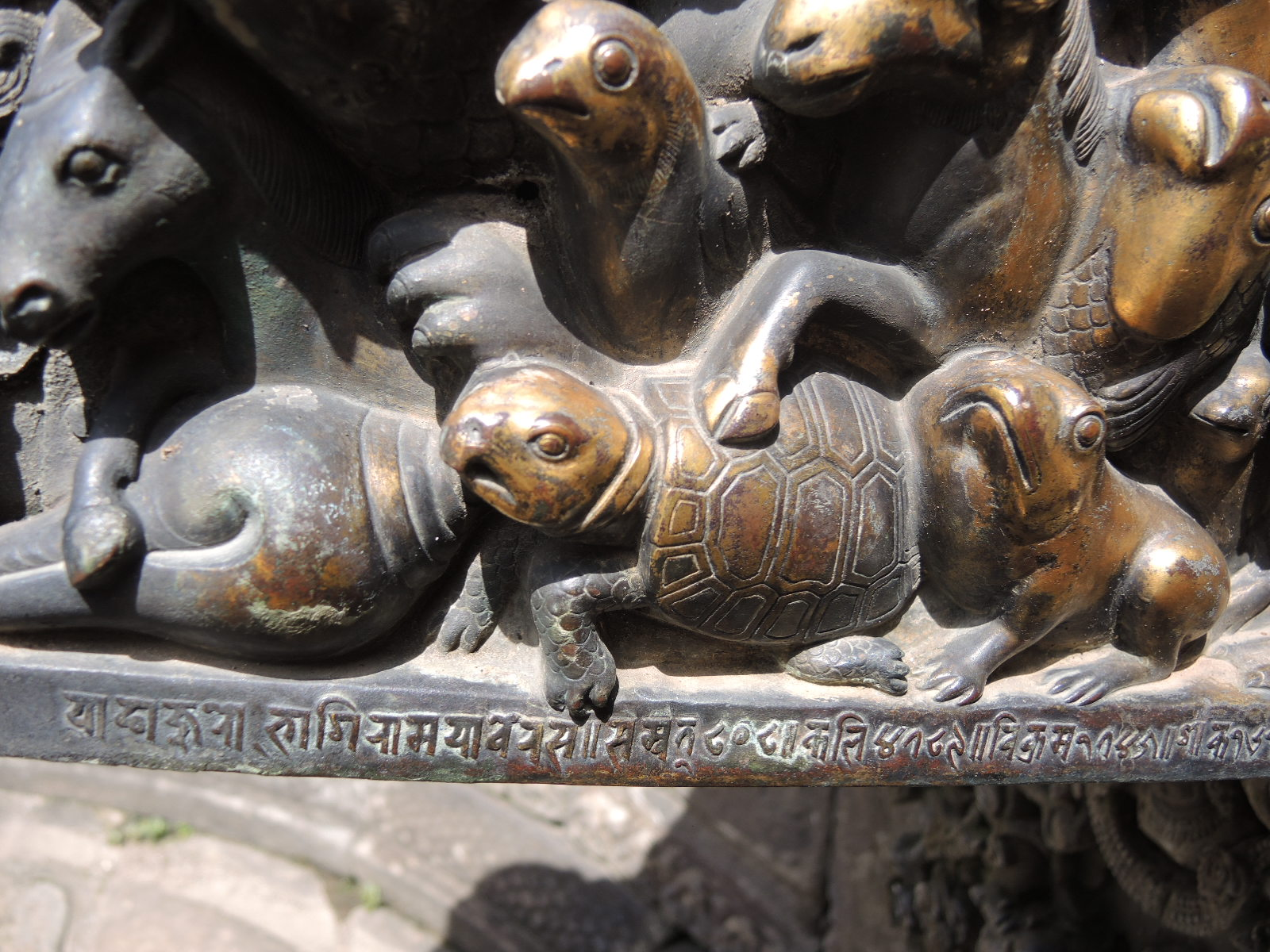
Detail of the spout with inscription

Following the example of King Siddhi Narasimha Malla of Patan in about 1640 AD and King Pratap Malla of Kathmandu in 1649 AD, King Jitamitra Malla of Bhaktapur also had a royal bath built in one of the courtyards of his palace in 1678. The work was completed in 1683.

In 1688, the King dedicated 10 ropanis (5087.2 square meters) of land to financing the maintenance of the hiti and also embellished it with a gilt spout. The date 1688 can be found in an inscription at the hiti itself.

The water was used for bathing by the king and queen and for the worship of the goddess Taleju.

The Thanthu palace that the royal bath was part of doesn't exist any more, but the bath is still a tourist attraction. It can be accessed from the Golden Gate at Bhaktapur Durbar Square, through a small gate past the Taleju Bhawani Temple.

== Architecture ==
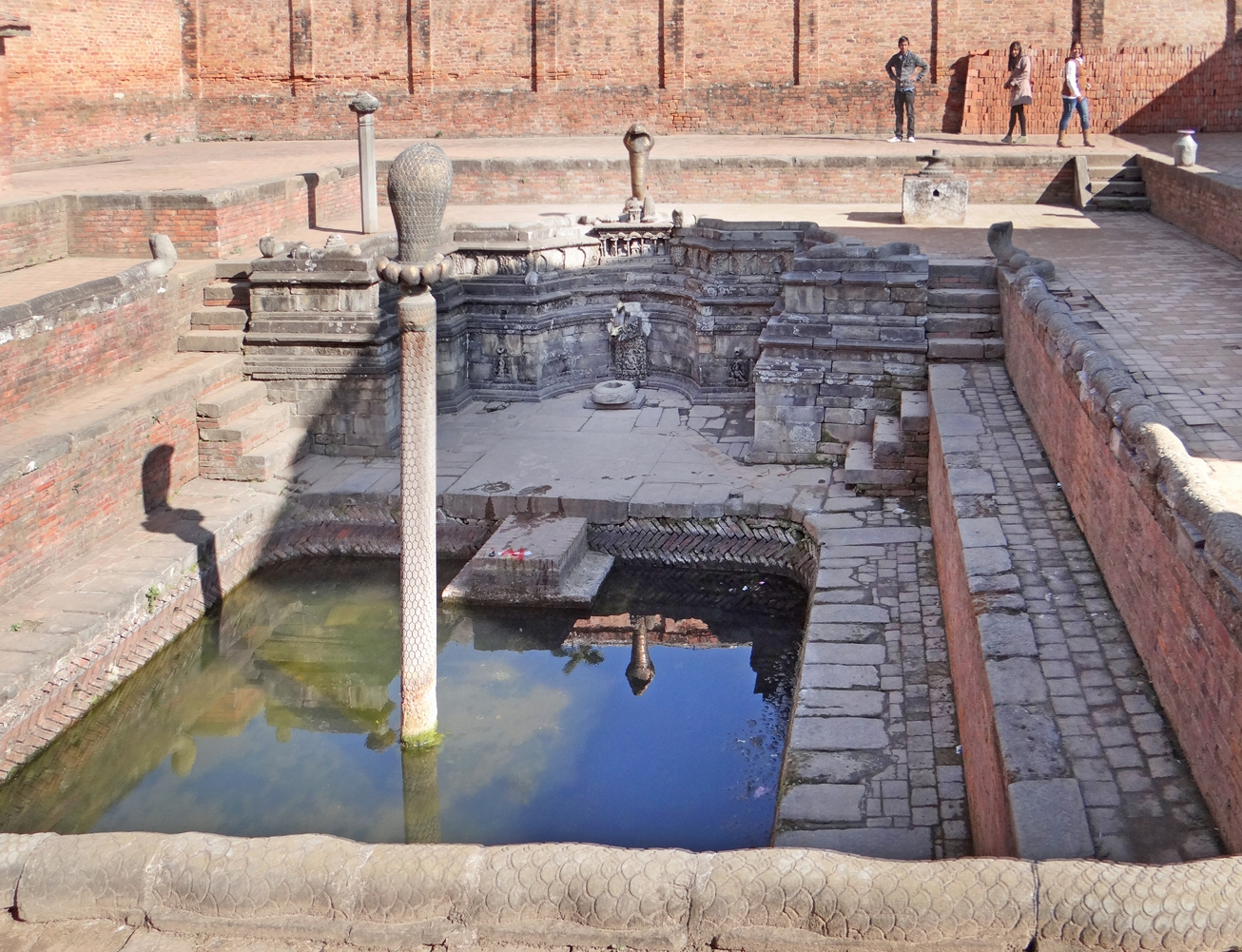

=== Basin and pond ===
Thanthu Darbar Hiti was built as a rectangular basin, 12.4 m (41 ft) long (east to west) and 9.3 m (31 ft) wide (north to south), with a depth of 2 m (6 ft 7 in) beneath ground level. The hiti was built using a combination of stone and brick, where stone was used for the bottom of the basin and the spout wall. The northern, western and southern sides of the basin have a terrace, the floor also covered with stone, but no further decoration. The eastern side of the basin is the spout wall.

Contrary to most hitis that were built beneath street level, no parapet surrounds the edge of the basin. Instead the entire rim of the basin is adorned with a total of 6 stone snakes, with their tails entwined and their heads raised as if in a state or arousal.

The basin can be entered via two flights of stone stairs, one on each side of the spout wall.

In the basin on the western side there is an almost square pond, about 5.6 m (18 ft) wide and 1.4 m (4 ft 7 in) deep, with rounded corners. Inside the pond on the spout wall side there is a flat stone with steps on two sides to safely descend into the water. In the centre of the pond stands a large wooden pole in the shape of a serpent (nagakastha or serpent timber). The head of the serpent is made of gilt metal. Both head and body of the sculpture have an engraved pattern of snake scales.

=== Spout wall ===
The spout wall is built with stone and has a scalloped appearance, with straight and rounded sections. The centre of the wall is occupied by the spout, but there are also two tutedharas (overflow reservoirs), one on each side. Beneath each of these three spouts a relief of Bhagiratha can be seen.

Just below the rim of the spout wall there is a row of 26 relief niches, that were once filled with sculptures of tantric deities. In the middle, above the spout, there is a mini temple with five niches. On top on ground level stand five miniatures: two shikaras, two pagodas and one shrine with a dome in the shape of a bell. Behind these stands another serpent, this time entirely gilt, looking towards the serpent in the pond.

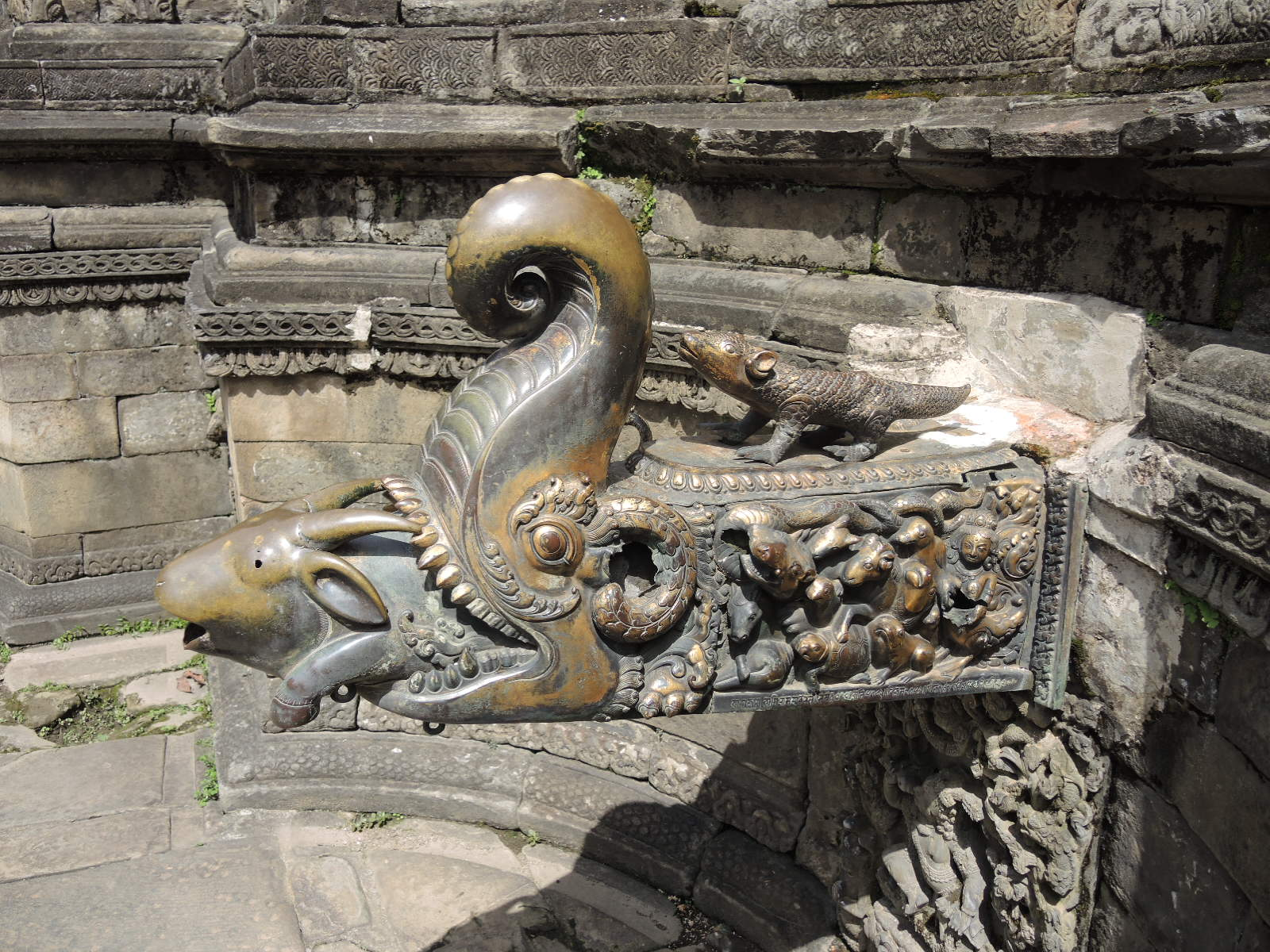

=== The spout ===
The gilt spout has the shape of a makara, that has half swallowed a goat; the head and front legs of the goat are sticking out from its mouth. A crocodile is standing on its back. The sides of the spout are completely covered with sculptures of all sorts of creatures associated with water and fertility, like a snake virgin (Nāgakanya), snake, turtle, frog, conchshell, hippopotamus, ram and cow.

=== The water ===
In 1678 King Jitamitra Malla built a state canal (or rajkulo) to bring water to the hitis of Bhaktapur. Although the primary objective of the canal was to bring water to Bhaktapur for worship in the Taleju temple, it was also used for irrigation, for watermills and for fishing along the way.

These days Thanthu Darbar Hiti is connected to the municipal water supply, but the supply is not very reliable.

The water from the hiti flows into the pond through a drain near the southern staircase, but the drain is not in a good condition due to a lack of maintenance.

=== Gallery ===
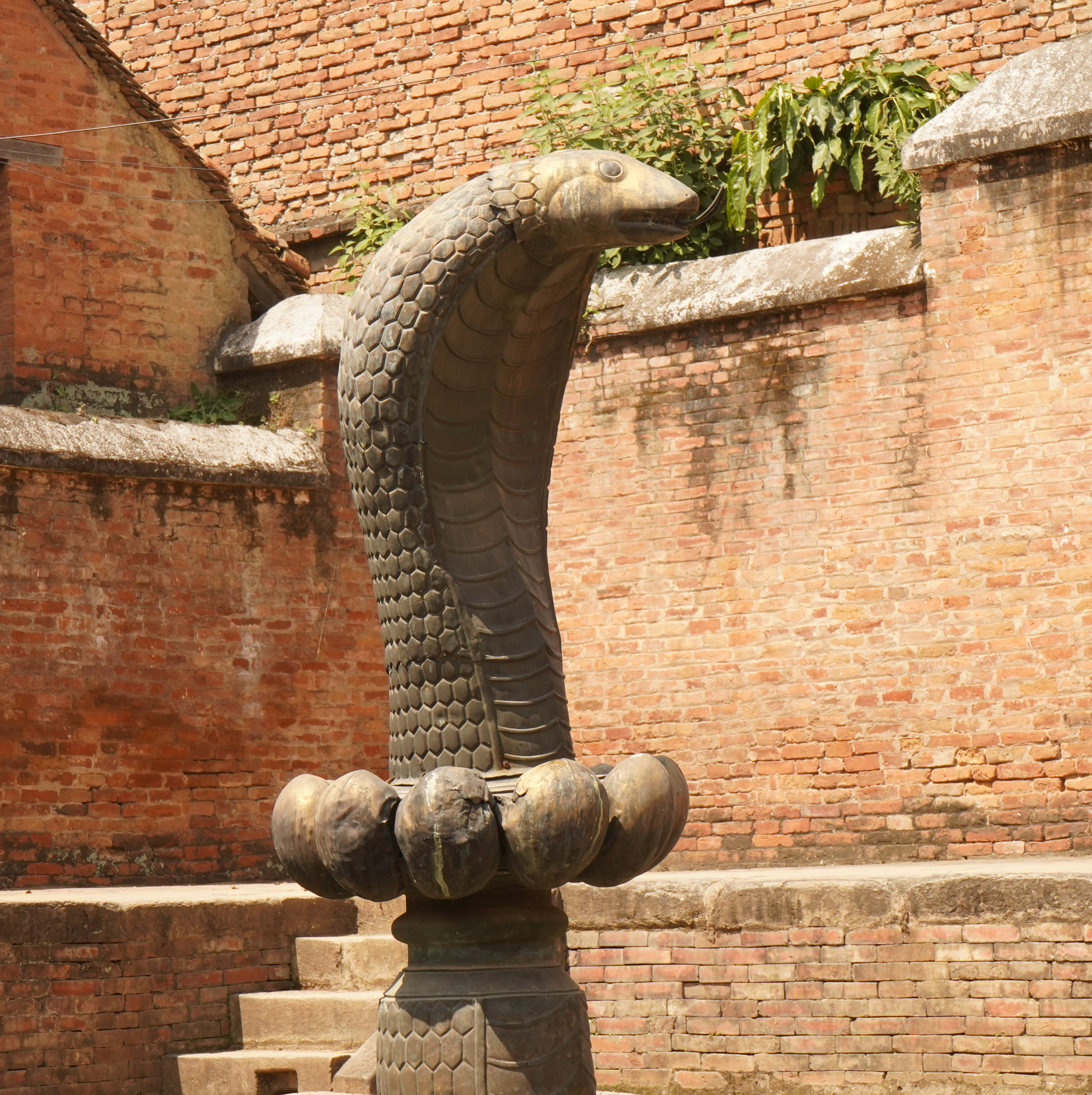
Nagakastha

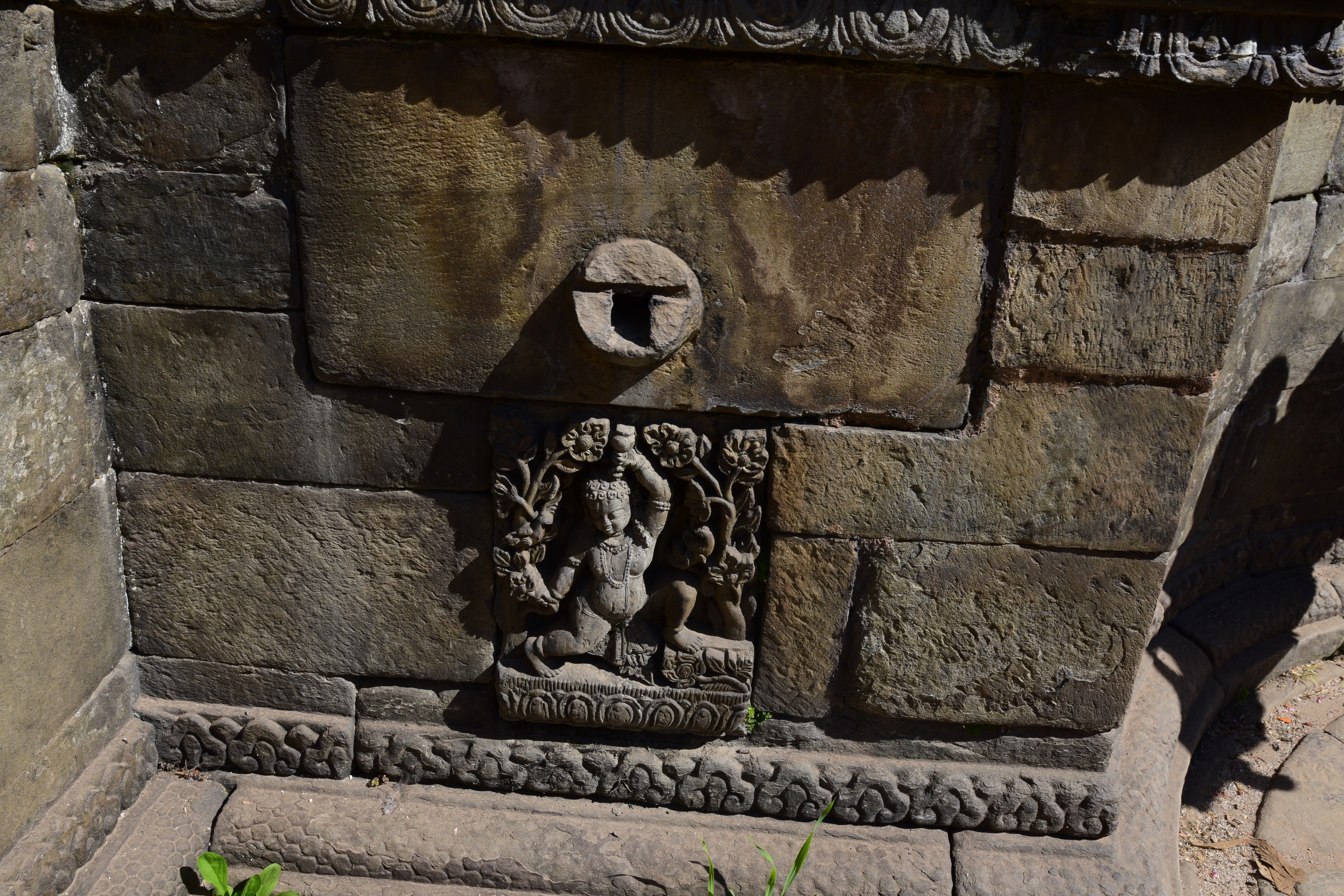
Tutedhara with Bhagiratha beneath the spout

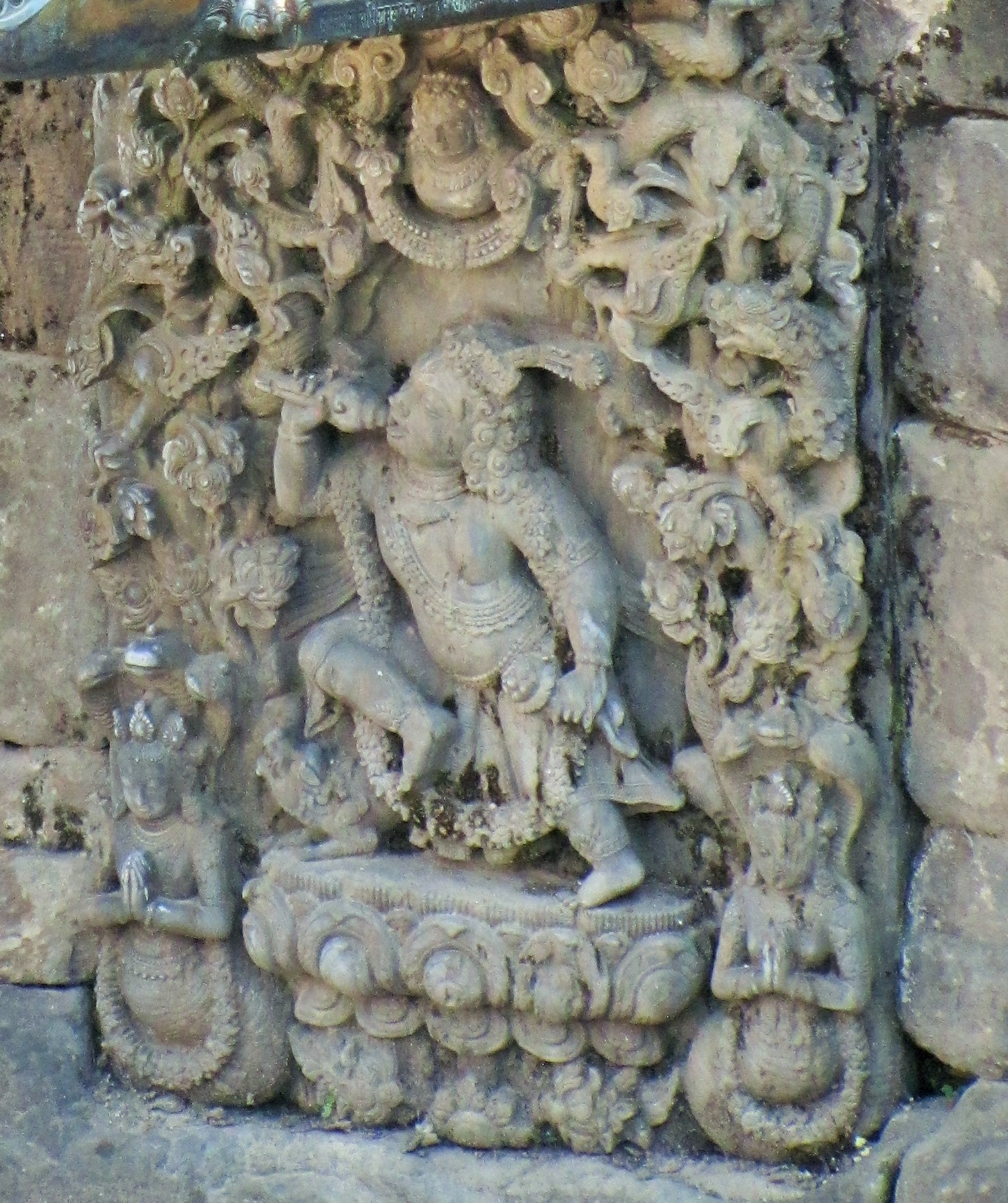
Bhagiratha beneath the golden spout

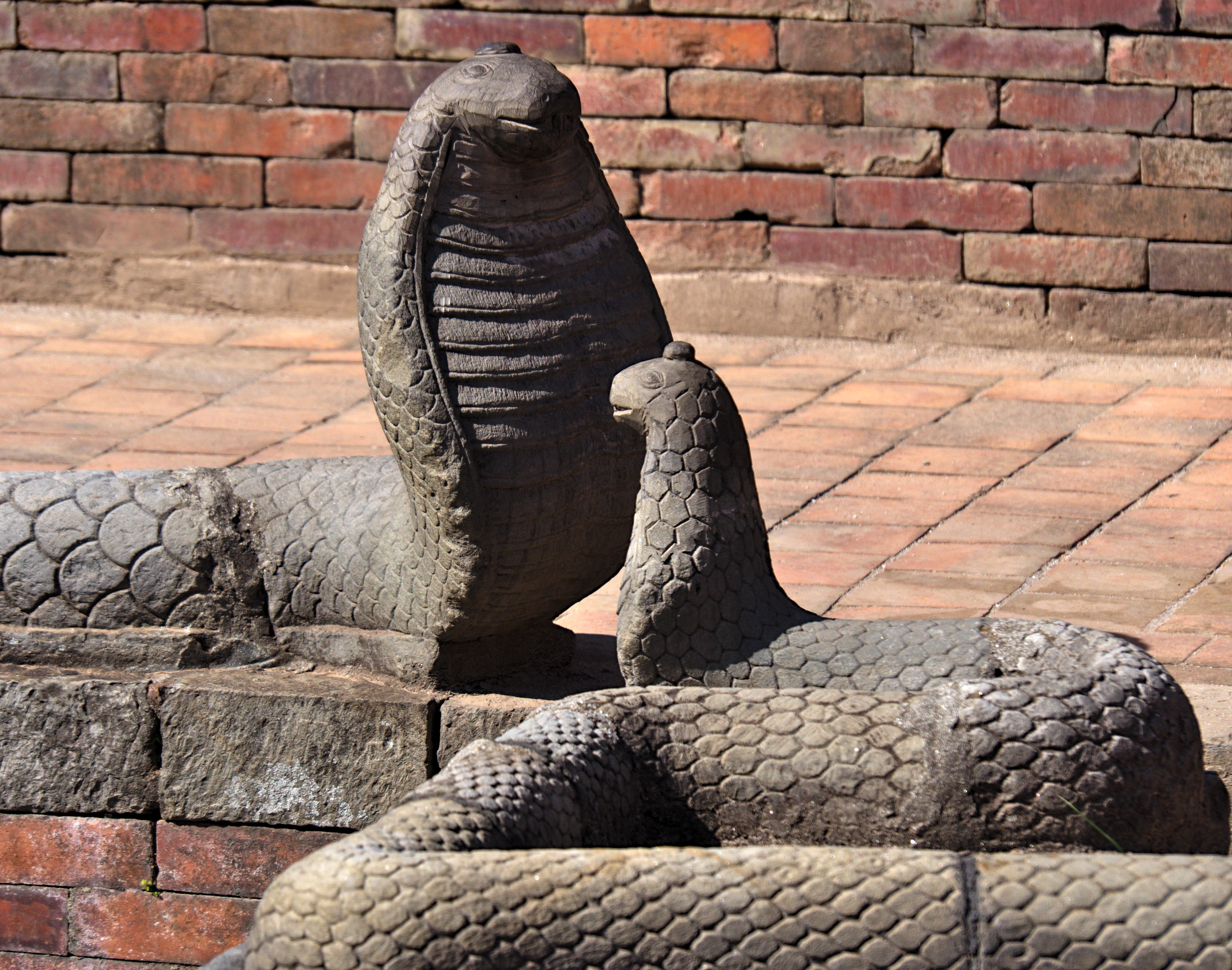
Snake sculptures on the rim

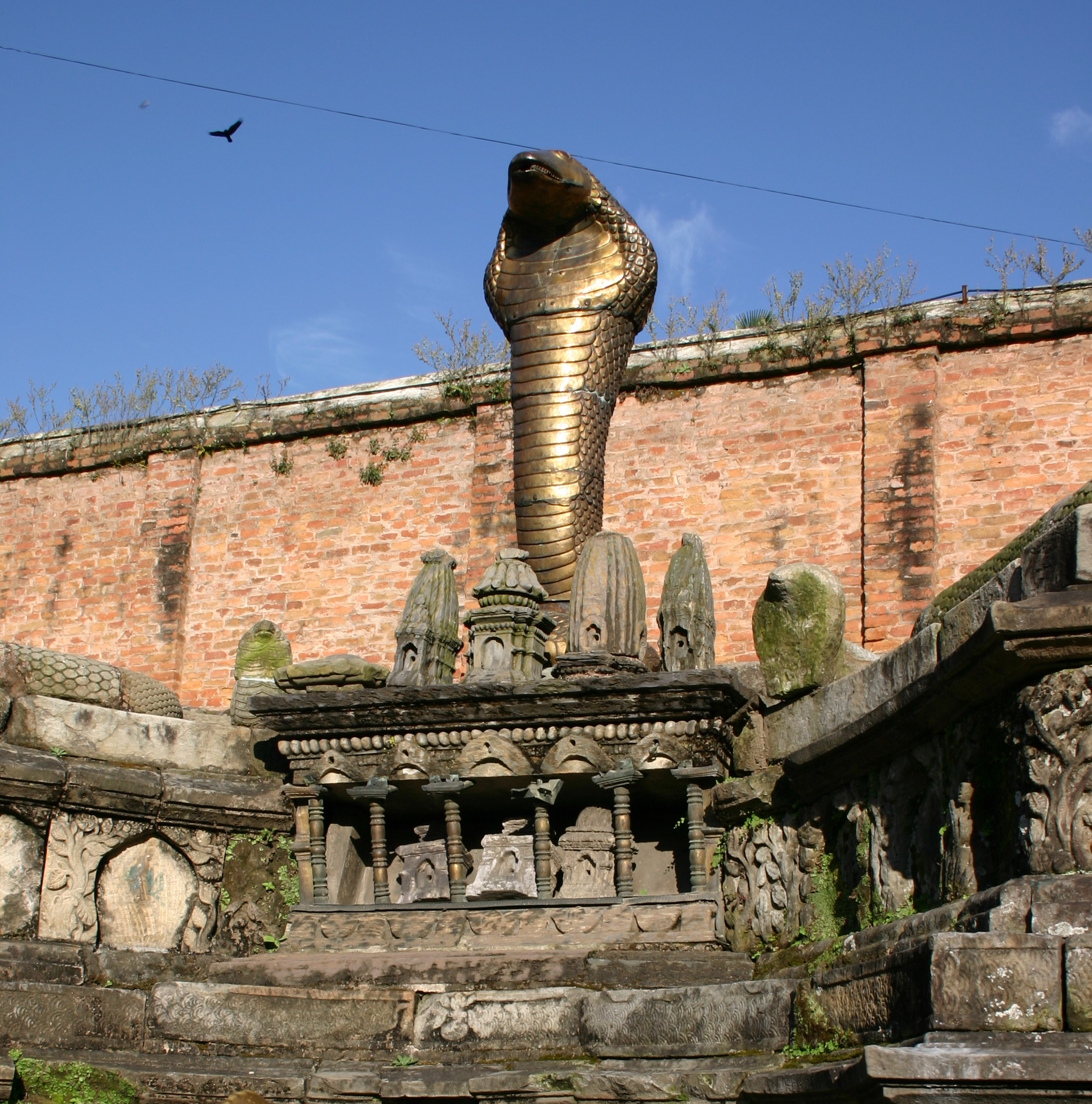
Middle section of the spout wall with miniatures

== Thanthu Darbar Hiti in popular culture ==
Thanthu Darbar Hiti was used as a location for the 1993 film Little Buddha by Bernardo Bertolucci. In 1995 the hiti was still very much overgrown.

== See also ==
- Alko Hiti
- Dhunge dhara
- Naag Pokhari
- Nagbahal Hiti
- Tusha Hiti
- Tutedhara
