= Bhaktapur =

Bhaktapur 𑐏𑑂𑐰𑐥𑑅 (Newar) भक्तपुर (Nepali) Bhadgaon
- Municipality (नगरपालिका)
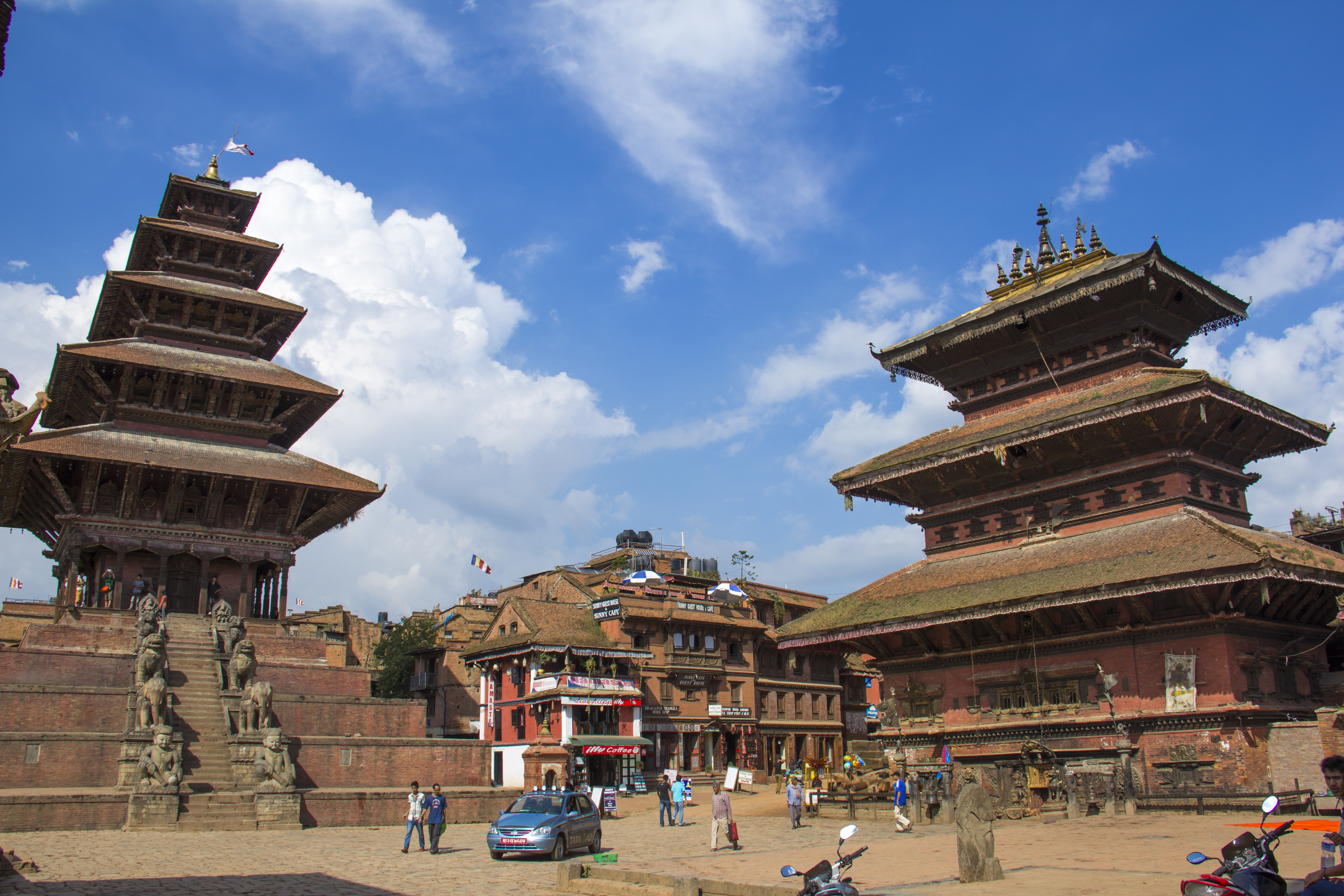
- Tamārhi, the main square of Bhaktapur which contains the Nyatapola.

- Seal
- Etymology: From Classical Newari: Khopring, lit. 'rice village' (See Etymology).
- Nickname: City of Festivals and dance
- Motto: Nepali: पुर्खाले सिर्जेको सम्पत्ती, हाम्रो कला र संस्कृति, lit. 'Creation of our ancestors, our heritage and culture'
- Location in Bagmati Province, Nepal Bhaktapur (Nepal)
- Coordinates: 27°40′20″N 85°25′40″E
- Country: Nepal
- Province: Bagmati
- District: Bhaktapur
- Founded: 12th century
- Founder: Ananda Deva
- Wards: 24 (historical); 10 (current)

Government
  - Mayor: Sunil Prajapati (NWPP)
  - Deputy Mayor: Rajani Joshi (NWPP)

Area
  - Total: 6.889 km^{2} (2.660 sq mi)
- Elevation: 1,401 m (4,596 ft)

Population (2021)
  - Total: 79,136
  - Density: 11,490/km^{2} (29,750/sq mi)
  - Ethnicities: Newar people
  - Religions: Newar Hinduism and Newar Buddhism
- Demonym(s): Newar: Khape; Nepali: Bhaktapure

Language
  - Official language: Nepal Bhasa and Nepali
- Time zone: UTC+05:45 (NST)
- Postal code: 44800
- Area code: 01
- Website: www.bhaktapurmun.gov.np

Bhaktapur (Nepali: भक्तपुर, pronounced [ˈbʱʌkt̪ʌpur]; lit. "City of Devotees"), known locally as Khwopa (Nepal Bhasa: 𑐏𑑂𑐰𑐥𑑅, Khvapa) and historically called Bhadgaon, is a city in the east corner of the Kathmandu Valley in Nepal located about 13 kilometres (8.1 mi) from the capital city, Kathmandu. Bhaktapur is the smallest municipality of Nepal by size as well as the most densely populated. Along with Kathmandu and Lalitpur, Bhaktapur is one of the three main cities of the Kathmandu Valley and is a major Newar settlement of the country. The city is also known for its Newar tradition, cuisine and artisans. Bhaktapur suffered heavy damage in the April 2015 earthquake.

As part of the Kathmandu Valley, it shares its history, culture and language with the other cities of the valley. Although chronicles like the Gopal Raj Vamshavali put the foundation of Bhaktapur in the 12th century, it has been the site of numerous settlements since at least the Licchavi dynasty. Bhaktapur served as the capital of Nepal during the first half of Malla dynasty from the 12th century to 1482 when Nepal split into three independent kingdoms. The Malla dynasty is considered a golden period for Bhaktapur and even after its division in 1428, Bhaktapur managed to stay as a wealthy and a powerful Newar kingdom, mostly due to its position in the ancient India-Tibet trade route. In 1769, Bhaktapur was attacked and annexed into the expanding Gorkha Kingdom (which later became the Kingdom of Nepal). After its annexation, Bhaktapur remained largely isolated from other parts of Nepal which led to stagnation in the development of its economy and arts and to allowed it to remain as a homogeneous Newar city. Due to being isolated and overlooked by the central government in Kathmandu, its infrastructure and economy deteriorated and the 1934 earthquake further exacerbated the situation. Bhaktapur's economy and infrastructure would only improve from the 1980s, largely due to tourism and aid provided by West Germany as part of the Bhaktapur Development Project.

Compared to other Newar settlements, Bhaktapur is predominantly Hindu and speaks a distinct dialect of Nepal Bhasa. Bhaktapur is one of the most visited tourist destination of Nepal with the city attracting 301,012 tourists in 2014. The Nyatapola, a five roofed pagoda completed in 1702 is the most famous structure of Bhaktapur and along with the former royal palace, it forms the tourism center of Bhaktapur. The city is also famous for its numerous festivals and carnivals like the spring festival of Biskā jātrā and the carnival of Sāpāru (or Gai jatra) both of which are significant part of the local culture and contribute well to tourism. Bhaktapur is also called the "Capital of Music and Dance" (Nepali: नाचगानको राजधानी) in Nepal due to presence of over 200 types of traditional dances, most of which are masked dances and except for a few, are a part of the annual carnival of Sāpāru (or Gai jatra). It is also famous for its cuisine with the jūjū dhau, a type of yogurt made from buffalo milk being the most popular. Bhaktapur's potters and handicraft industries are also known nationwide. Due to its well preserved medieval nature, UNESCO inscribed Bhaktapur as a World Heritage Site since 1979.

== Etymology ==
The earliest use of the name "Bhaktapur" is from an inscription from 928. It is widely accepted that the name is a Sanskrit translation of the city's name in the native language, an early form of the Newar language, Khōpring. The earliest use of this name is from a Licchavi dynasty inscription from 594. The name Khōpring is a combination of two words from an early form of the Newar language, "kho" and "pring" which translate to "cooked rice" and "village," respectively. The city was also sometimes referred as Bhaktagrāma instead of Bhaktapura where grāma denoted a village as opposed to pura which denoted a town in Sanskrit.

From Khopring also evolved, Khwopa , the name of the city in the classical and modern form of the native Newar language. Khwopa as the name for the city, appeared for the first time in a manuscript from 1004. The term Khwopa was used to describe the city in almost all of the inscriptions, manuscripts and documents from the Malla dynasty.

Another popular name for the city was "Bhatgaon", the Hindustani and Khas translation of "Bhaktagrama". This name became particularly popular after the conquest of Bhaktapur by the Gorkhali armies of Prithivi Narayan Shah in 1769. It is believed that the official name was changed back to Bhaktapur in the 1930s by the decree of the Prime Minister Juddha Shumsher Rana, after witnessing the numerous temples in the city and the devotion of the locals towards it, decreed that the city should be referred as Bhaktapur as in "City of devotees" instead of Bhatgaon. "Bhakta" in Bhaktapur also means cooked rice in Sanskrit.

== History ==
=== Antiquity ===
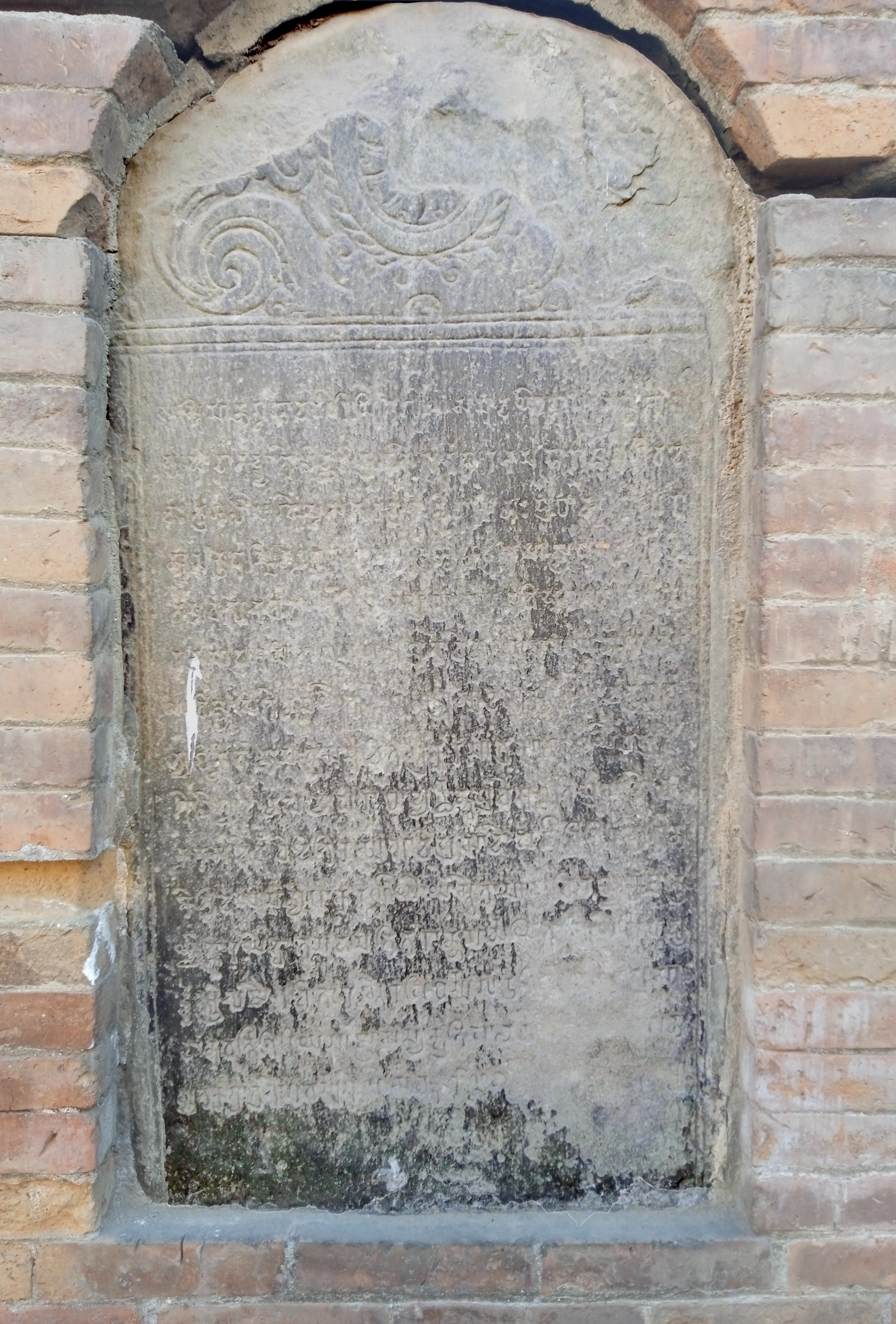
Sanskrit language stone inscription dated 594 at Gomārhi, central Bhaktapur is the oldest one found in the city.

The folklore of the Kathmandu Valley states that the entire valley and as such Bhaktapur itself was once an enormous lake. Geological surveys conducted by Swiss geologist Toni Hagen proved that the Kathmandu Valley was in fact a lake which formed when the Lower Himalayan Range was being created due to the collision between the Indian and Eurasian plate. The lake water started eroding the limestone hills of Chobhar and starting from around thirty thousand years ago, the lake started to drain. Plain lands appeared in the valley and between 30,000 and 15,000 years, most of the valley was drained. In folklore, the credit of draining the valley is given to the Bodhisattva Manjushri . Believed to be a saint from Greater China, Manjushri is said to have cut a gorge from his sword in order to drain the valley so that he could worship and gain wisdom from Swayambhunath Buddha who resided in the lake. Manjushri is believed to have entered the Katmandu Valley from the east and his resting place has been made into a shrine where the people of Bhaktapur make a pilgrimage to every year during late winter and before the festival of Shree Panchami.

Apart from above, much of the early history of Bhaktapur is largely unknown. It is clear that people started to settle in the Kathmandu Valley after it was drained due to its fertile soil owing to it being a lakebed. The Gopal Raj Vamshavali, a 14th-century Newar language manuscript states that a clan known as Gopāla first settled the Kathmandu Valley. The manuscript further says that Gopāla, who were cow herders, were overthrown by the Mahispāla, who were buffalo herders. Soon, the Kirata King Yalambar conquered the valley and established his own Kirānta dynasty. Although no direct proof of the existence of the first three ruling dynasties as mentioned in the Gopal Raj Vamshavali has been found, indirect proof such as place names and mentions in the inscriptions of the Licchavi period has been used to support the existence of at least the Kirānta dynasty. For Bhaktapur as well, the existence of a non-Sanskrit name, Khopring, in the Sanskrit language stone inscriptions of the Licchavi dynasty supports the existence of a settlement before the arrival of the Licchavi clan from Vaishali. The modern day Jyāpu community of the Newars is believed to be the descendants of the Kirānta clan and the modern day Newar language is believed to derived from the language that he Kirānta clan spoke.

=== Licchavi dynasty ===
Three stone inscriptions from the Licchavi dynasty has been recovered so far in Bhaktapur. One of them dated to 594 was recovered in Gomārhi district in the eastern part of Bhaktapur was made during the reign of Amshuverma. Another similar inscription from 594, recovered from Tulāche district in the central part of Bhaktapur was also made during the reign of Amshuverma. The Gomārhi inscription contains a decree from Amshuverma that "people from Mākhopring draṅga should be given more rights for a self rule." Similarly, the Tulāche inscription contains a similar message but the settlement has been referred as "khōpring grāma". During the Licchavi dynasty, settlements with a minimum of 100 houses and a maximum of 500 houses were classified as "grāma" and wealthy settlements were classified as "draṅga". So, the settlements around the present day Gomārhi district were wealthier than the settlements around the present day Tulāche district. In Nepal Bhasa, Mā is a prefix meaning "main or principal", meaning Mākhopring was a sub-division of Khopring, most likely the main part of Khopring. Finally, a third inscription recovered at Tālako district in the southwestern part of Bhaktapur mention the place name as "mākhoduluṃ" which was probably a separate village from Khōpring.

Bhaktapur's oldest hiti is also dated from the Licchavi dynasty. It is said that the Rajkulo canals, which supplies water in hitis were built and managed by Tulā Rāni, a mythical queen who is believed to have lived in Bhaktapur during the Licchavi dynasty. In folklore, Tulā Rāni made and repaired the Rajkulo canals as she is said to only weigh a single tola or 11 grams and hence float on water.

=== Foundation ===
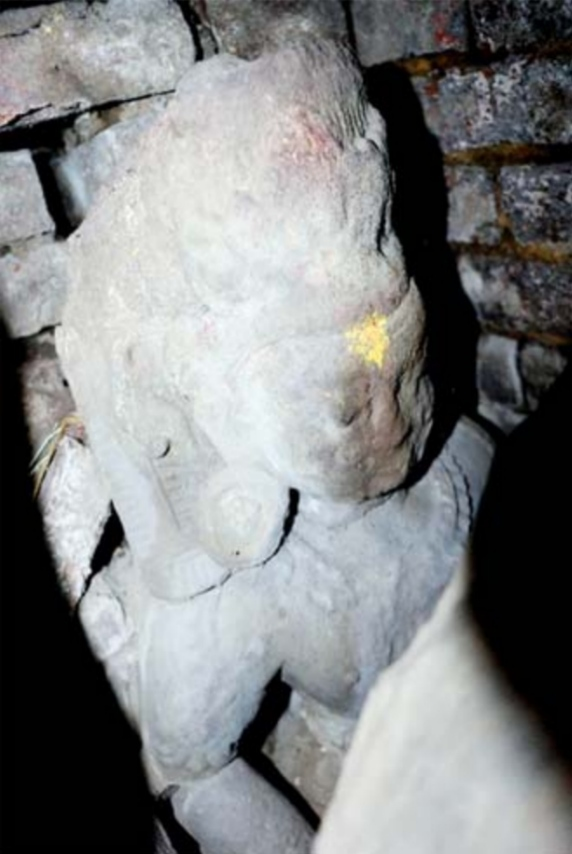
Statue of Ananda Deva, the founder of Bhaktapur recovered at the courtyard of Sulamā Māhādeo temple, Bhaktapur.

In the 14th century Gopal Raj Vamshavali, Ananda Deva, who ruled Nepal Mandala from 1146 to 1167 is credited to have established the city of Bhaktapur. Since there were already settlements in Bhaktapur like Mākhopring and Mākhoduluṃ during the Licchavi dynasty, it was more likely that Ananda Deva unified these smaller settlements into a single unit. It is traditionally believed that Bhaktapur contained 12,000 houses at the time of its foundation. Ananda Deva also established a royal court named Tripura Rājkula in the central part of Bhaktapur and declared it as the new capital of Nepal. The Gopal Raj Vamsavali also state the foundation of shrines of eight Matrikas surrounding the city and a ninth and the most important shrine, that of Tripura Sundari, at the centre of the town. This arrangement of the shrines of mother goddess is used to conceptualize the entire town as a sacred Mandala. Within the city itself, there are also ten minor shrines of the Mahavidya established by Ananda Deva as well. The later 19th century chronicles state that Ananda Deva was directed to establish Bhaktapur by the Goddess Annapurna.

=== Capital city of Nepal ===
As Bhaktapur became the seat of the government, it also became the target for numerous foreign invasions. The main reasons for these attacks was the internal division among the royal family of Nepal. Soon after Ananda Deva's death, a new royal house emerged from within. Believed to have been started by Ari Malla, they used Malla as their surname replacing their ancestral surname, Deva. When the conflictions between both houses worsened, the House of Tripura sought help from Tirhut while the House of Yuthunimam sought help from Khasa Kingdom. Thus, both of these kingdoms started interfering in the internal politics of Nepal. In the 1310s, the monarch Rudra Malla in order to improve Nepal Mandal's relation with Tirhut married off his sister Devaladevi to the Tirhut king, Harisimhadeva. After the marriage, the relation between the two kingdoms smoothed and Tirhut's attack on Nepal ceased.

In the month of January 1326, Devaladevi along with son, Jagatsimhadeva and her court departed from Tirhut after it was invaded and captured by Ghiyas-ud-din Tughlaq, the Sultan of the Delhi Sultanate. Her husband Harisimhadeva died on the way while Devaladevi and her family arrived at her birth kingdom of Nepal Mandala where she was welcomed by her brother Rudra Malla. In July 1326, just six months after the arrival of Devaldevi, her brother Rudra Malla died. Nayakdevi, Rudra Malla's daughter became the new ruler of Nepal Mandala under the regency of her grandmother Padma Lakshmi. In 1326, Nayakdevi was married to Harishchandra, the prince of Kashi by her grandmother but the court rebelled against him after the death of Padma Lakshmi at the age of sixty seven in July 1332 and was eventually assassinated in May 1335. After Harischandra's death, Devaladevi in a bid to gain political power married her son Jagatsimhadeva to her niece Nayakdevi. In January 1347, Nayakdevi gave birth to a daughter who was named Rajya Laksmhi Devi (Rajaldevi in short). Nayakdevi died ten days after giving birth to Rajaldevi. Her death triggered a chain of unrests in the palace during which Jagatsimha was imprisoned and he died in custody. Devaldevi established her own rule in Nepal Mandala as regent for her granddaughter/grandniece, Rajaldevi.

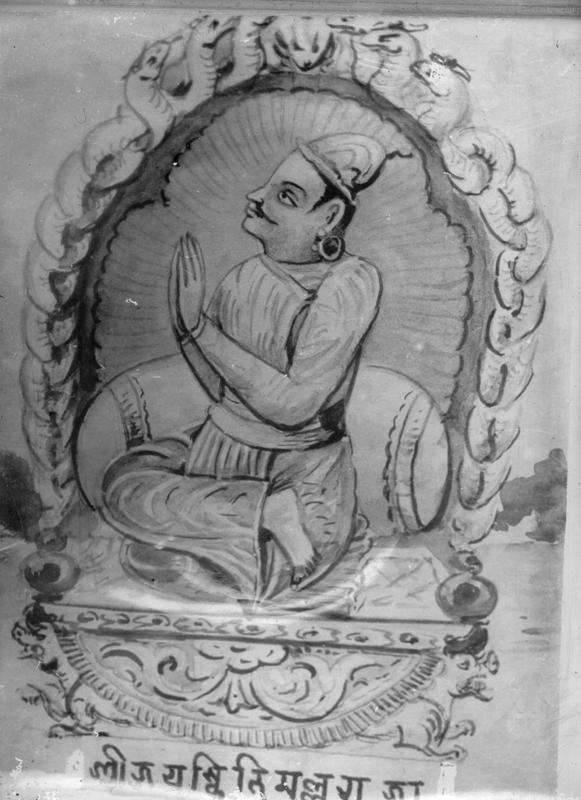
Jayasthiti Malla was introduced to Nepal as a prince consort for Rajalldevi and established absolute rule in 1382.

In 1349, Nepal suffered one of the most devastating attack in its history. Shamsuddin Ilyas Shah, the Sultan of Bengal and his armies plundered the Nepal Valley for a week in the winter of 1349. Bhaktapur suffered the most from this attack as not only it was the capital at that time, the city was also in the eastern part of the valley, the same direction the 20,000 forces came from. According to the Gopal Raj Vamshavali, Bhaktapur was ransacked and set on fire by the invaders which lasted for seven days and the populace were either killed or escaped in the mountains. Some historians cite this invasion as the reason for the disappearance of monuments from the Licchavi and the early Malla dynasty. After the invasion, which destroyed much of the city, Bhaktapur was entirely rebuilt under Devaldevi, who like Ananda Deva, did so on the basis of Sanskrit treatises in architecture. The layout of the old part of the city has remained mostly the same since then.

In September 1354, a nine year old Jayasthiti, a Danwar noble from Mithila was brought into Bhaktapur and was eventually married to Rajalladevi Malla in January 1355. After Devaladevi died in 1366, Rajalladevi and her king consort Jayasthiti Malla took control of Nepal Mandala and under their reign Nepal experienced a period of stability and cultural as well as economic growth. Jayasthiti Malla defeated warring nobles and unified Nepal Mandala under a singular monarch. It is said that Jayasthiti Malla brought Brahmins from Mithila and South India and under their recommendation, revived and improved the already present Hindu caste system based on occupation. Jayasthiti Malla is also credited for making the Newar language as the language of administration, literature and religion. The influential Gopal Raj Vamshavali, a Newar language manuscript about the history of Nepal, was commissioned by Jayasthiti Malla. Jayasthiti Malla was also the first monarch of Nepal to claim a divine heritage as the Gopal Raj Vamshavali states him as the one blessed by Swayambhunath and the incarnation of the Buddha, a claim inherited by all future monarchs.

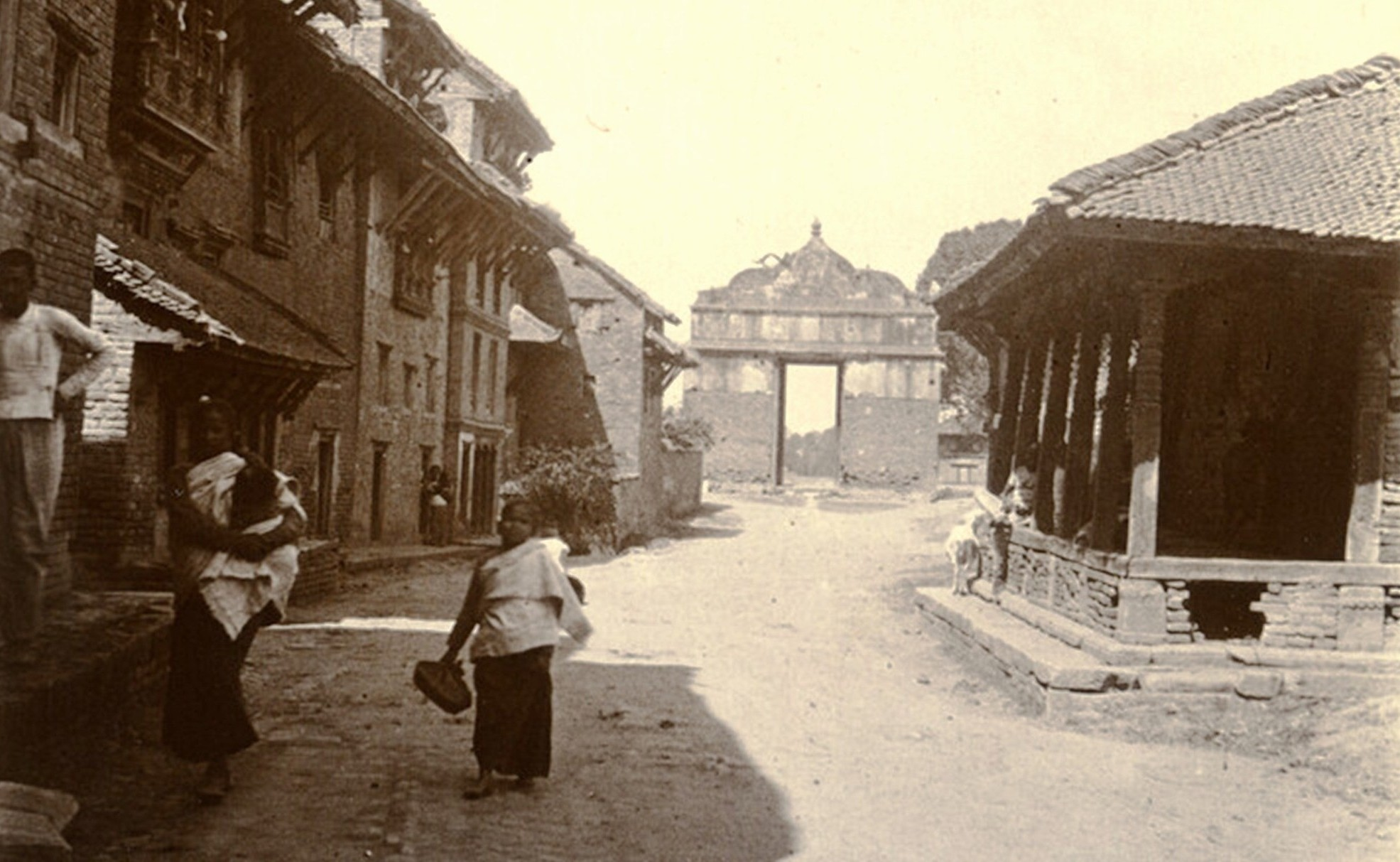
Ruins of the medieval city gate in eastern Bhaktapur built originally under Yaksha Malla in the 15th century was destroyed in the 1934 earthquake.

His grandson, Yakshya Malla was the last king of a unified Nepal Mandala who ruled from Bhaktapur from 1428 to 1481. Yaksha Malla had numerous wives and concubines including Sarupādevī, Karpuradevī, Udayādevī, Jīvalakṣmī, Jayatanā, Kṛtilakṣmī, Sarasvatidevī (among which Sarupādevī and Karpuradevī were the most influential) and therefore numerous issue. He is also known to have fortified his capital, Bhaktapur with moats, defensive walls and eight city gates which correspond with the shrines of the Eight Matrikas. He also made it mandatory for all citizens of Bhaktapur regardless of caste or wealth, to repair and maintain the defensive walls and moats during the annual festival of Sithi Nakha. Yaksha Malla's numerous children caused a huge issue in the kingdom after his death in 1481. His eldest son was Raya Malla and because of his age, he was crowned as the new king of the country. But his two step-brothers Ratna and Ari Malla and his step-sister Ratnādevī, all three of whom shared the same biological mother protested against the coronation and as a result broke off from the capital and established a new one in Kathmandu where Ratna Malla declared himself the king. Similarly, Raṇa Malla shared a same biological mother Rana Malla broke off from the capital to Banepa where he declared himself as its new king. In this way, the kingdom of Yaksha Malla was divided among his sons among which Raya Malla, the eldest became the king of the former capital city, Bhaktapur.

=== Kingdom of Bhaktapur ===
Raya Malla is considered a weak figure in the History of Nepal. Many historians blame Raya Malla's reluctancy to give up the throne for the division of Nepal Mandala. The newly formed Kantipur kingdom and its king barred him from taking any oaths and Diksha from their tutelary goddess, Taleju whose shrine was located in the palace of Bhaktapur while at the same Ratna Malla would repeatedly take oaths from the Taleju shrine of the Bhaktapur palace. Yaksha Malla's large number of descendants meant that even during his great-grandson – Praṇa Malla's reign there were several other members of the Malla family were still in Bhaktapur. Two such Mallas, Vira and Gosain Malla, both of whom were older than the monarch sought help from Kantipur and the king of Kantipur, Narendra Malla in a bid to weaken Bhaktapur, claimed Vira Malla to be the legitimate ruler. Likely fueled by Narendra Malla, both Vira and Gosain Malla divided the city of Bhaktapur between themselves and Prana Malla and established a border at Inācho, Bhaktapur. Ganga Devi, the queen consort of Vishva Malla seized control of the kingdom and started a joint rule with her two sons Trailokya and Tribhuvan Malla. Ganga Devi, who was also popularly called as "Ganga Maharani", was the only queen regnant who ruled the kingdom. During her reign, Bhaktapur would reach its territorial zenith. She is regarded as the first strong ruler of Bhaktapur Kingdom and is widely known for her military conquest and construction works. She is also credited with unifying the city by appointing many of Yaksha Malla's descendants who were living in the palace as fort captains, chiefs of other cities and villages within the kingdom which effectively ended their claims to the throne. She was the first ruler of Bhaktapur to take Diksha from Taleju along with her two sons, the tutelary goddess of the Mallas in 9 April 1567 as previous rulers were barred to do so by Kantipur, which provoked Kantipur and launched an attack Bhaktapur in retaliation. Her reign saw numerous cultural changes in the form of festivals as she is credited to have improved the numerous festivals celebrated within the kingdom. The locals of Bhaktapur credit her as the builder of many of the hitis and public rest houses within Bhaktapur as well as numerous Narayana temples of the city but no any inscriptional evidence of it has been found.

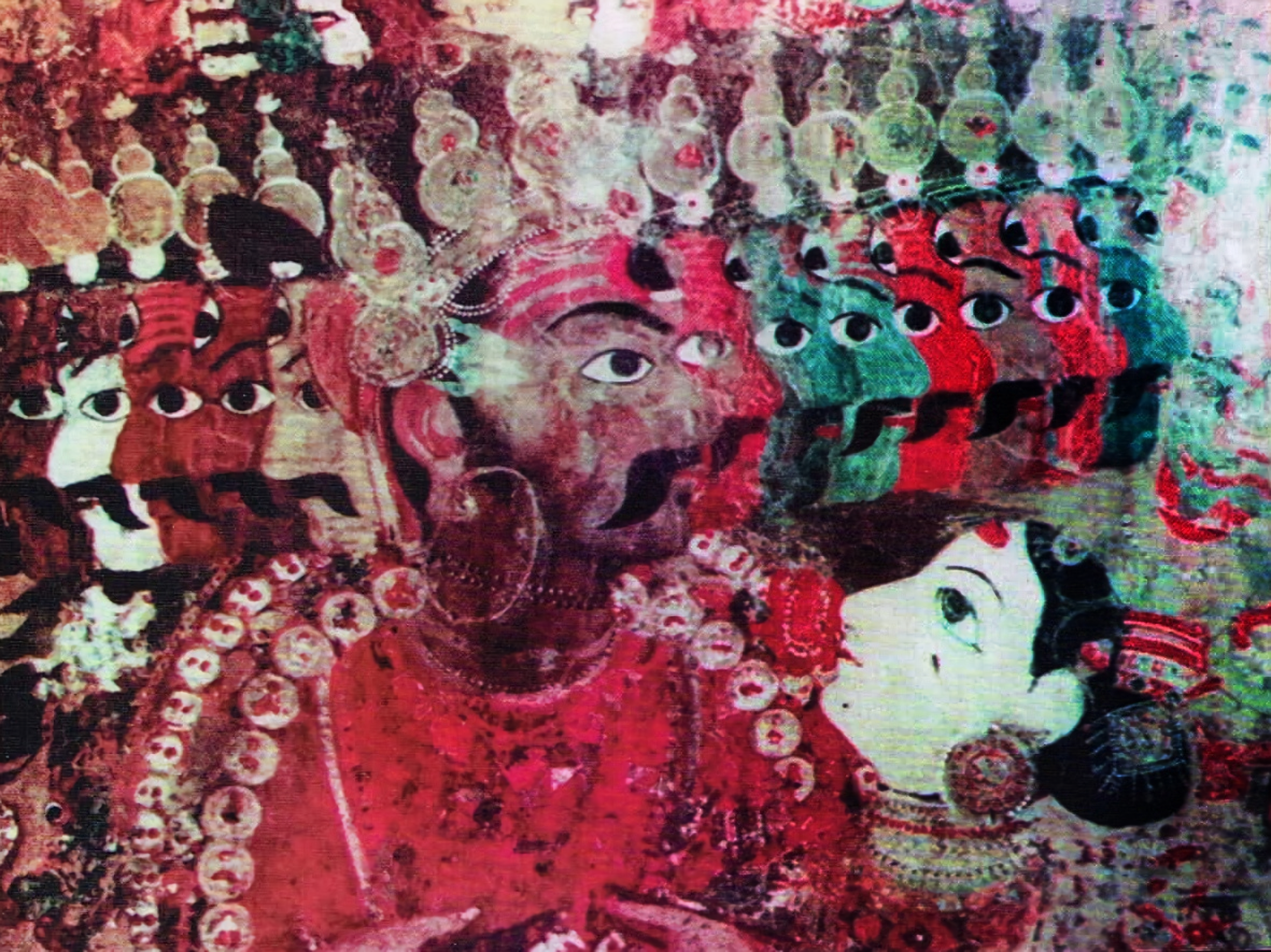
Detail of a mural at the royal palace which depicts Bhupatindra Malla and his queen Vishva Lakshmi as a divine couple. Bhupatindra Malla reigned from 1696 to 1722 and his reign is considered the cultural highpoint of Bhaktapur.

Ganga Devi's death has not been properly studied yet. It is possible that she died in 1602 as after 1602, her eldest son Trailokya Malla is the only one addressed as the king in inscriptions and legal documents. Her youngest son, Tribhvana Malla who arguably was more powerful under her disappeared from historical records since 1602. Trailokya Malla ruled alone till his death in 1613 after which his son, Jagajjyoti Malla became the ruler. Jagajjyoti Malla is especially remembered for his contributions in Maithili literature. His work, Haragaurīvivāha, a play about the wedding of Shiva to Parvati, is considered one of the greatest works in the Maithili language. After Jagajjyoti Malla died in 1642, Naresha Malla's short rule began. Naresha Malla proved to be a weak king and it was during his reign that Pratap Malla, the king of Kantipur, in his attempt to unify the Kathmandu Valley, attacked Bhaktapur. Naresha Malla died at an early age, leaving behind a four year old Jagat Prakasha Malla as the successor to the throne. His aunt, Annapurṇalaksmi served as regent for him till he turned 16. Meanwhile, Pratap Malla made an alliance with Srinivasa Malla, the king of Patan and both joined forces to start a siege of Bhaktapur. By 1660, the coalition conquered all the hamlets and villages, north of Bhaktapur and managed to reach the northern city gate. The coalition tried to break the gate open for months before being forced to retreat. During their siege, Pratap Malla installed a stone inscription on a hiti in the shrine of Mahakali near the northern gate. During April 1662, Pratap Malla had gathered a massive army in the eastern part of Bhaktapur, in the site outside the city proper where the annual Biska Jatra festival was held demanding the festival will only be held if the kingdom surrendered. Jagat Prakasha Malla released decree cancelling the festival that year, a first time where the festival was cancelled. Eventually, the sieges proved unsuccessful and the coalition were forced to retreat.

Jagat Prakasha Malla died on 8 December 1672 because of smallpox after which the reign of Jitamitra Malla began. He is fondly remembered for the construction of a canal which brought water to the city from the hills of Nagarkot. His son, Bhupatindra Malla, who succeeded him in 1696 is likely the most popular ruler from Bhaktapur because of the numerous construction works that took place during his reign. The Nyatapola, today a symbol and landmark of the city was commissioned by him. His son Ranajit Malla was the last ruler of the Kingdom of Bhaktapur and is remembered today for his musical contributions and talents. The Newar language devotional songs he wrote are still sung in Bhaktapur today.

In November 1769, Bhaktapur was attacked and after suffering a heavy loss, the state eventually surrendered to the expanding Gorkha kingdom, which would become the future Kingdom of Nepal.

=== Rana Regime ===
After its defeat in 1769, Bhaktapur lost most of its political and cultural importance to Kathmandu and Lalitpur, the capital of the newly formed Kingdom of Nepal. Bhaktapur was visited by Colonel Kirkpatrick of East India Company in 1792 and in his book described the city as being in a better state than Kathmandu or Lalitpur. Bhaktapur played a small role during the rise of Jung Bahadur Rana as its former palace was where King Rajendra Bikram Shah was imprisoned in 1847. After the establishment of the Rana dynasty in 1846, Rana's brother Dhir Shumsher Rana was appointed as the mayor of the city. Dhir Shumsher oversaw the demolition of many of the old palaces of Bhaktapur and its replacement with British style inspired buildings.

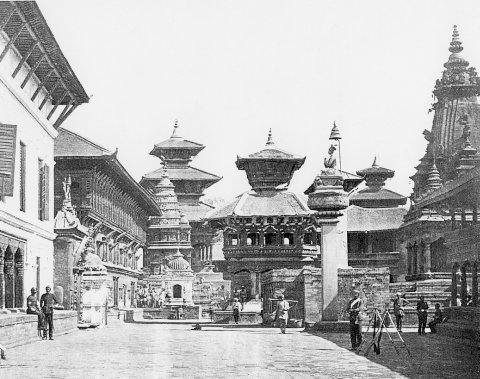
A general view of Bhaktapur Durbar Square before the 1934 earthquake which destroyed almost all the buildings in the square.

The great earthquake of 1833 and 1934 devastated most of the city including the palace and temples. In the earthquake of 1833 especially, Bhaktapur suffered the most damage in the Kathmandu Valley. Out of 500 total casualties of the earthquake, at least 200 of them were in Bhaktapur. Around 25% to 70% of the town suffered major destruction, including at least 2,000 homes and six to eight temples.

When the 8.0 magnitude earthquake struck in 1934, Bhaktapur was one of the most affected towns of Nepal. Around 40-100% of residential buildings were directly affected while 6224 buildings were completely destroyed by the earthquake. Many of the old palaces and temples which were already weakened by the earthquake of 1833 were also completely destroyed. Almost all the buildings in Bhaktapur Durbar Square were heavily damaged. Around 177 heritages were completely destroyed during the earthquake.

Many of the Malla era temples and palaces of the city like the Basantapur Lyākū, Chaukot Lyākū and Thanthu Lyākū were completely destroyed in the earthquakes and many of them were never restored and the few that were, were reconstructed in a Mughal style stucco dome by the Ranas.

The economy of Bhaktapur, which had already been struggling after losing the flow of Tibetan traders, was acceleratedly aggravated by the earthquakes of 1833 and 1934. The 1934 earthquake also damaged the physical infrastructure of the town and most of the inhabitants were unable to rebuild their houses properly. The earthquake permanently damaged the Rajkulo canals that had been providing fresh water to the city since the time of the Mallas. Due to the malaise economy and cash-strapped budget, Bhaktapur was unable to revamp these broken canals, as a result, fresh water became scarce in the city.. The sanitation level of Bhaktapur became severely low and poverty and diseases became rampant.

=== 20th century ===
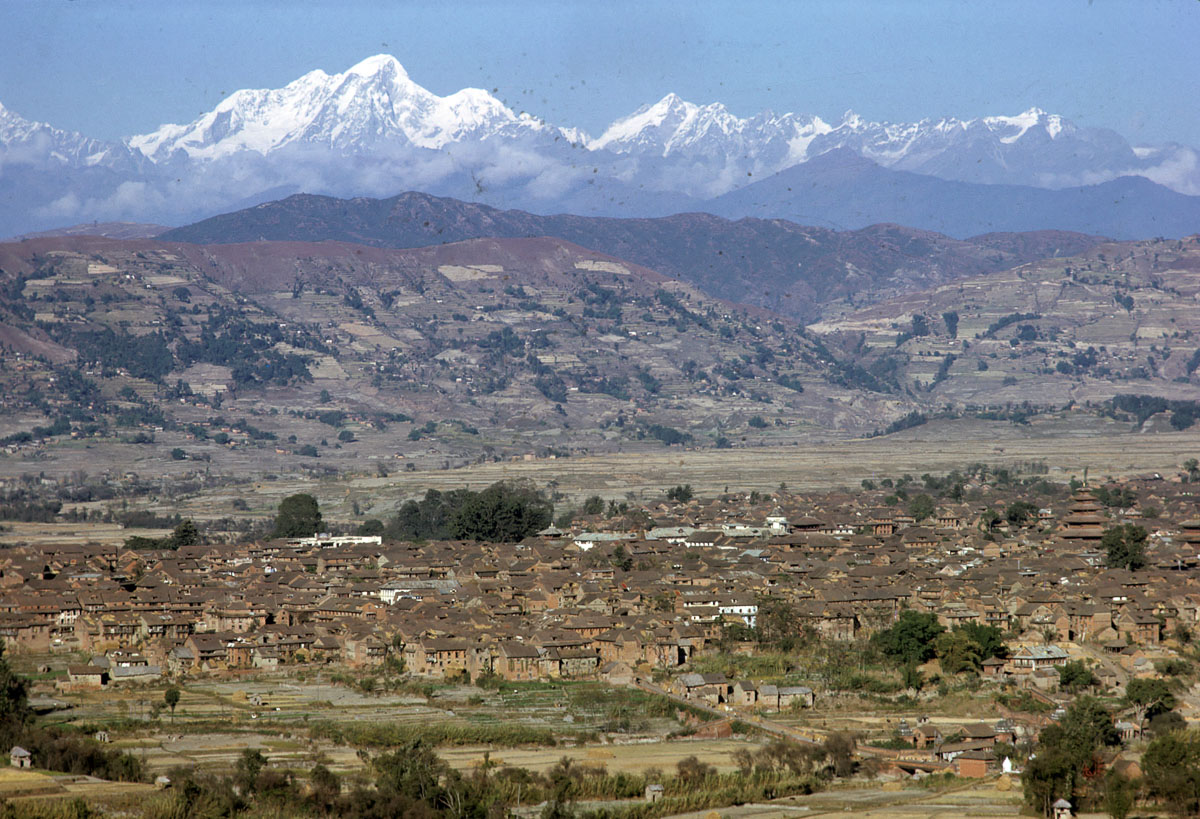
Aerial view of Bhaktapur in 1962 with the Nyatapola Temple on the far right and the Langtang mountains in the background.

In the 1950s, when the tyrannical Rana dynasty ended and Nepal was open up to the outside world, Kathmandu and the other cities around it like Patan saw a considerable rise in urbanization and population. However, Bhaktapur was farther away from the capital and was left out from the development that occurred in the other cities of the Kathmandu Valley. Bhaktapur was also greatly isolated and ignored by the central powers. When a new highway was built, it completely bypassed the city and instead ran through the outskirts. Consequently, Bhaktapur was the poorest city of Nepal in the 20th century. The Rajkulo canals that provided fresh water was never repaired and sanitation level was very low. Due to extremely high population density and low sanitation, the city became extremely unhygienic as feces and litter filled the roads. Diseases and pandemics were rampant and greatly affected the farmers composing the majority population of Bhaktapur, who couldn't afford necessary modern medicine. Just like its inhabitants, the heritages of Bhaktapur also suffered greatly during this period as many arts and artifacts were stolen.

Under the Bhaktapur Development Project which was funded by West Germany, the city's physical infrastructure and heritage sites were all revitalized and renovated. Tourism started to became a major source for Bhaktapur's economy. A political party named Nepal Workers Peasants Party was started in the city and it gained the support of majority farmer population of the city.

=== 2015 earthquake ===
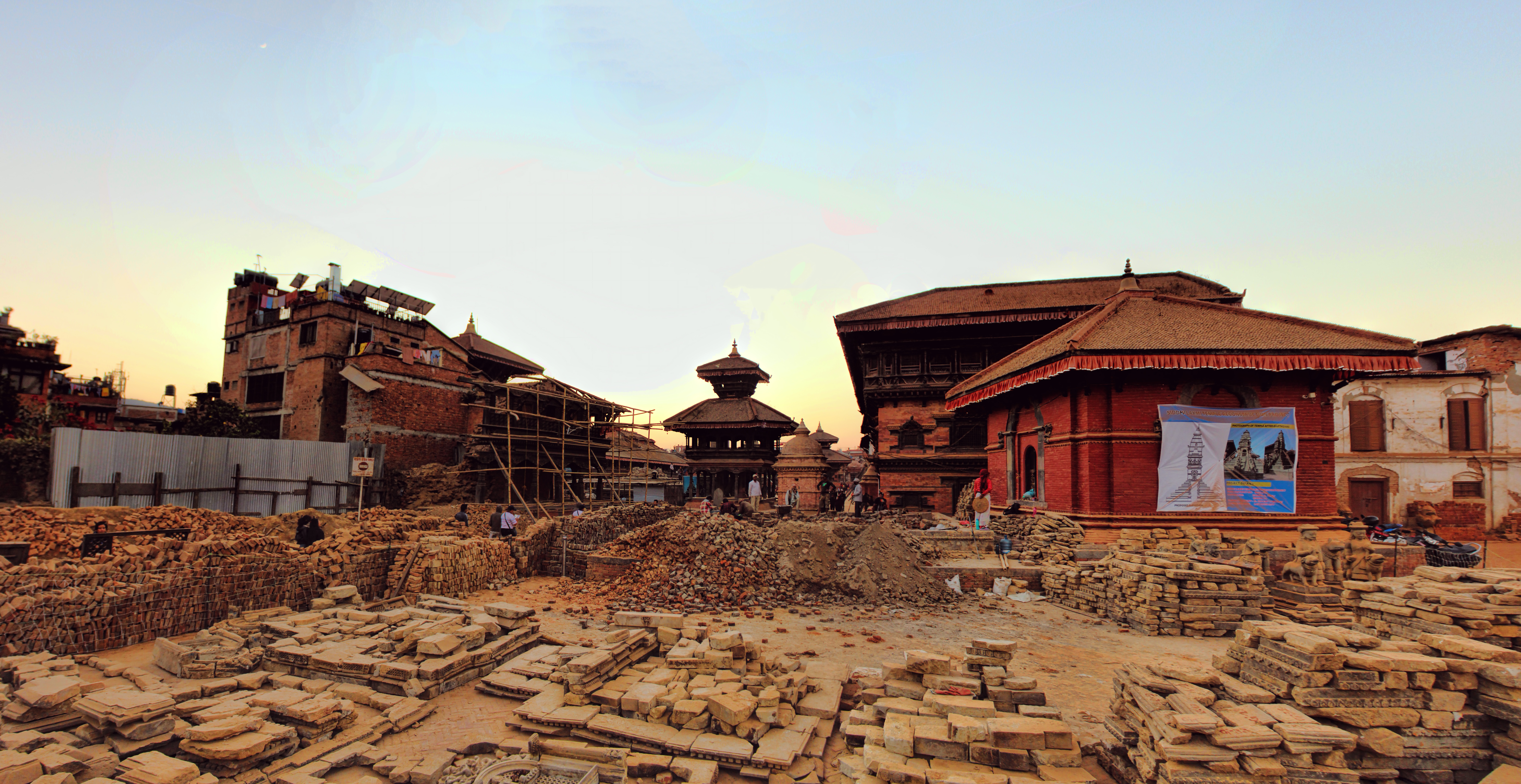
Bhaktapur Durbar Square under reconstruction after 25 April 2015 earthquake

A magnitude of 7.8 Richter earthquake 2015 Nepal earthquake that struck on 25 April 2015 (12 Baisakh 2072 B.S., Saturday, at local time 11:56 am) damaged 116 heritages in the city. 67 of those heritages were completely damaged while 49 suffered from partial damages. The earthquake badly damaged the Bhaktapur Durbar square, a significant historial heritage site included in the UNESCO world heritage list. The main premises of Taleju Temple also witnessed damages in the disaster.

The Nepal-Bihar earthquake in 1934 demolished several buildings that were never rebuilt. Chyasilin Mandap has been rebuilt in 1990 using contemporary earthquake proof technology. The building survived the 2015 earthquake unharmed.

== Demographics ==
A song composed by Ranajit Malla in 1769 mention Bhaktapur as a city with 12,000 households. Henry Ambrose Oldfield who visited Nepal during the 1850s wrote that there were fifty thousand inhabitants in Bhaktapur.

At the time of the 2001 Nepal census, it had a population of 72,543. The 2011 Nepal census reports the population of Bhaktapur as 81,748 with 41,081 men and 40,667 women. The results of the 2021 Nepal census put the population of Bhaktapur at 79,136 with the population of men at 39,755 and of women at 39,381, respectively, and the total number of households at 18,987. Around 90% of the population of Bhaktapur belong to the Newar ethnic group.

== Culture ==
=== Architecture and art ===
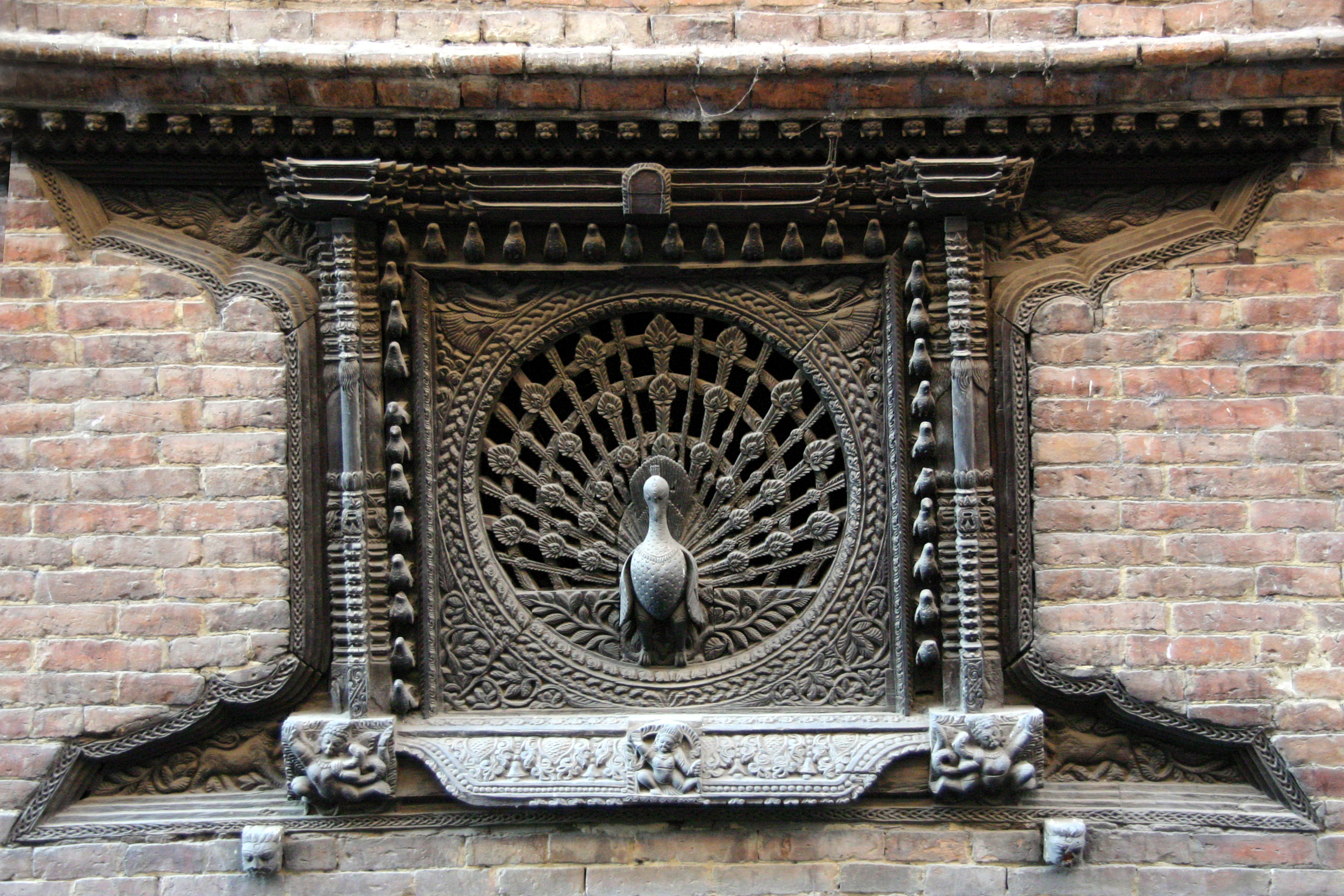
Mhekhājhya or the Peacock window.

Bhaktapur, being a former capital of a Newar kingdom, contains one of the most elaborate art pieces of Nepal. Only a few artworks from the Lichhavi dynasty survive in Bhaktapur and so most art pieces date from the Malla dynasty. Most of Bhaktapur's art were religious in nature and were made by anonymous artists coming from a caste of artisans. A few artisans however are known. For instance, the painter who made the murals on the walls of the palace of fifty windows has signed his name on one of the murals. However, many of the murals in the palace were damaged when it used as a post office and a police station in the 20th century and the painter's signature has unfortunately been rubbed off, with only his address remaining readable today.

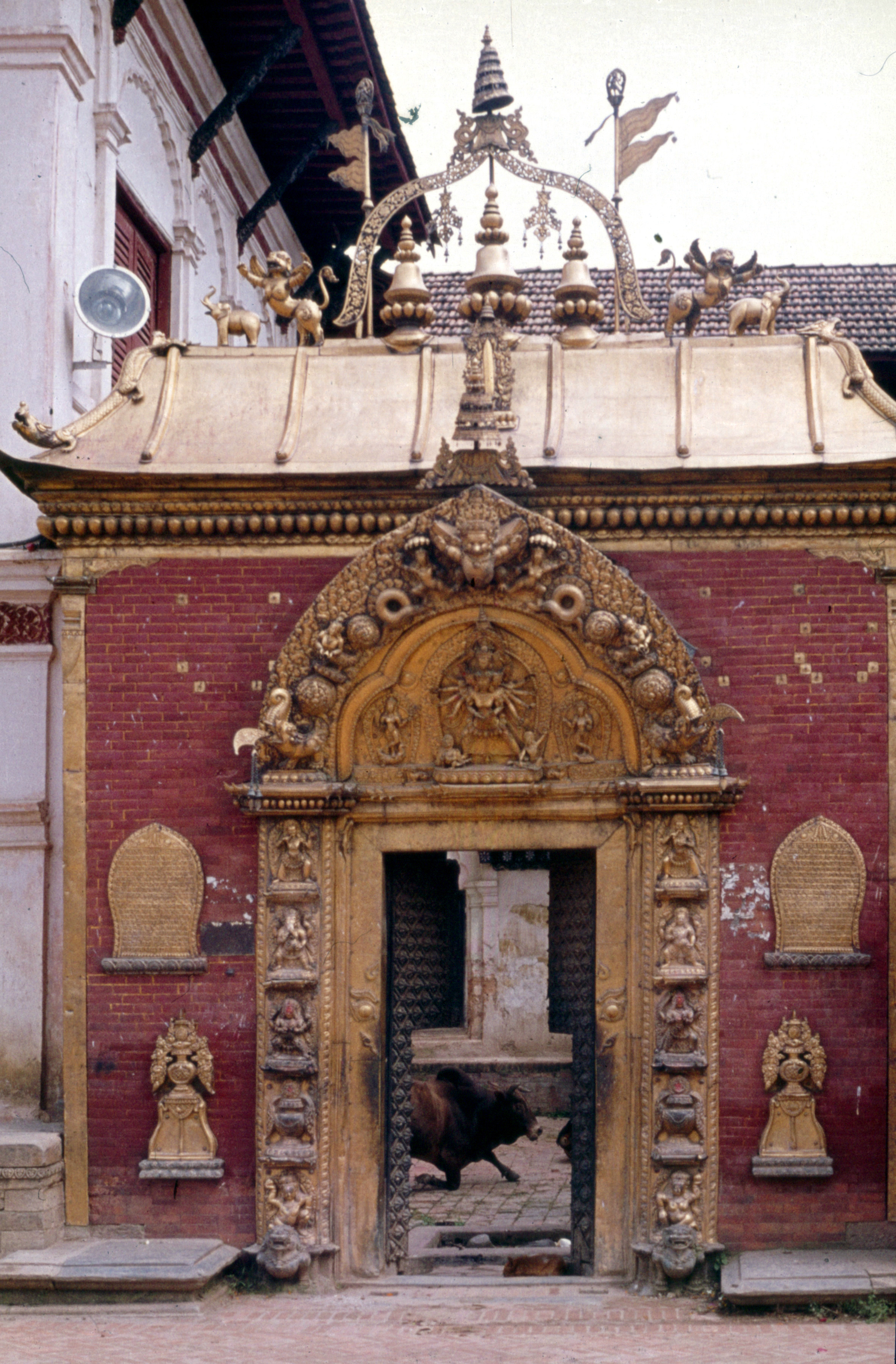
Luṁ dhvākā or the Golden gate commissioned by Ranajit Malla and made by Subhākara, Karuṇākara and Ratikara.

Woodcarving is a major artwork of the Kathmandu Valley. Most of the wooden work from the Lichhavi dynasty that survives today are wooden struts or posts which mostly depicted Salabhanjikas, the forest fairies or deities in a similar pose. Four armed deities began appearing since the 16th century and by the end of the Malla dynasty, wooden struts depicted multi armed Hindu deities. This transformation was not viewed fondly by all scholars citing the loss of elegance in later wooden struts. Toraṇa or tympanums are in most cases wooden as well and can be found on most temples, monasteries or palaces. The wooden toraṇa on the entrance to the Taleju temple in Bhaktapur Durbar Square is considered one of the best examples of the kind. Similarly, Newar window are an important aspect of Nepalese architecture. The Mhekhājhya, or more popularly the Peacock window from 1750 is the most popular traditional window from Bhaktapur. The Malla dynasty was, for Bhaktapur a golden age for woodcarving, sculpture and the arts in general.

Similar to woodcarving, very few stone or metal sculptures from the Licchavi dynasty survive in Bhaktapur and so almost all surviving works are from the Malla dynasty. Most stone sculptures are of deities housed in various temples of the city and their leonine guardians. The most celebrated sculptors from Bhaktapur lived during the late 17th to early 18th centuries. These artisans, whose identity has no been properly known yet, carved some of the most popular stone works of the city including the Narasimha, Hanuman, Devi and Bhairava sculptures near the entrance to former palaces, numerous sculptures in the restricted courtyards of the palace and the relief of Devi inside the Nyatapola. The ledger work of the construction of the Nyatapola mention Tulasi Lohankami as the leader of thirty sculptors, so it is likely that his group may have been the one responsible for all aforementioned works.

The Luṁ dhvākā or the Golden gate which serves as an entrance to the inner courtyards of the former royal palace was constructed between 1751 and 1754 by Subhākara, Karuṇākara and Ratikara. It is considered one of the most important works of Nepalese art. Just as popular as the Golden Gate is the gold plated bronze statue of Bhupatindra Malla placed on a stone pillar in front of the gate, crafted by a smith from Kathmandu.

=== Hiti ===
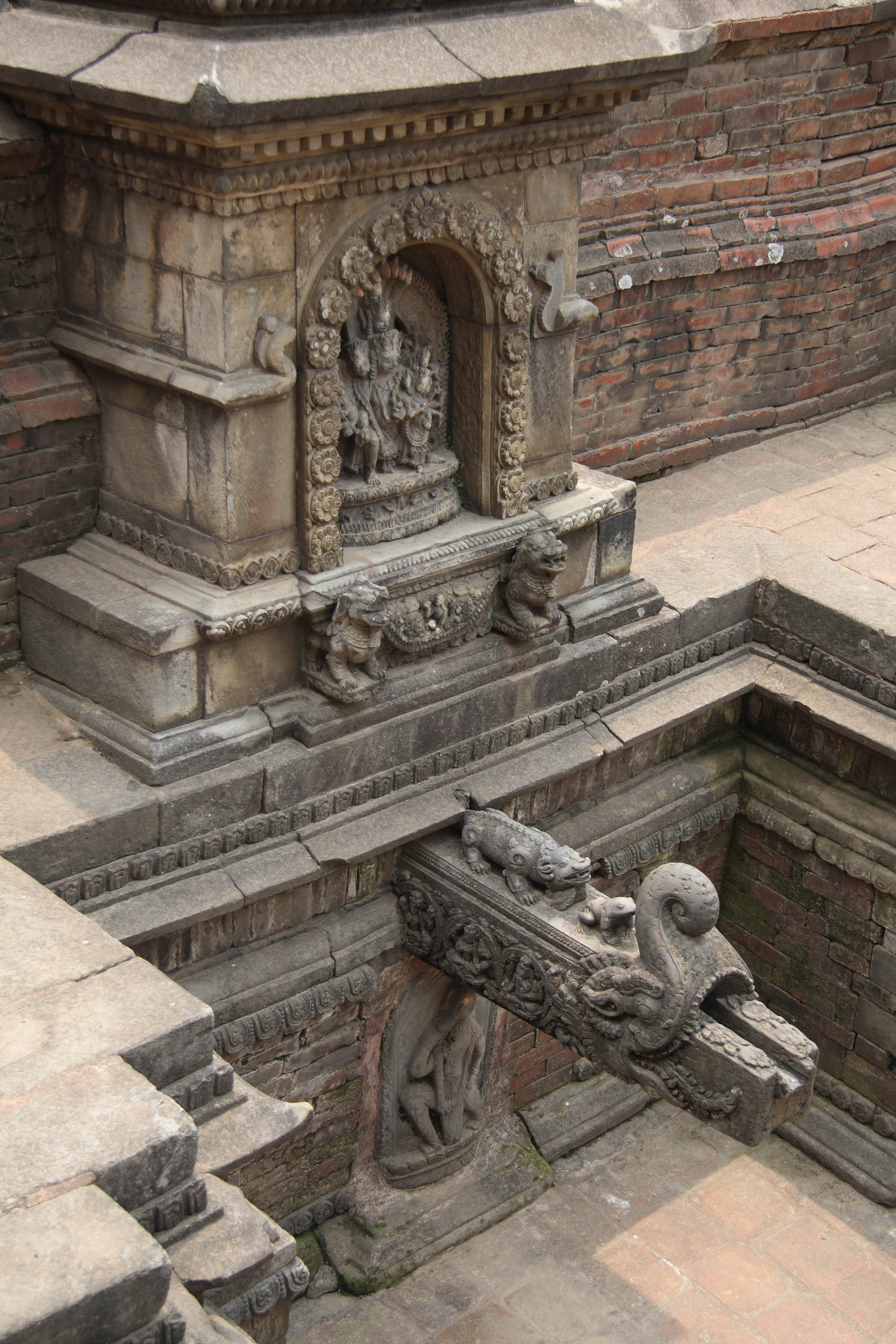
Layaku Hiti, Bhaktapur.

The entirety of Kathmandu Valley, including Bhaktapur is known for its hiti water supply system which once supplied water from the surroundings hills into the heart of the cities of the valley. These fountains are carved in the form of a Hindu and Buddhist mythical creature known as a hitimanga. The hiti water supply system was developed in the Licchavi dynasty and Bhaktapur's oldest hitis also date from the period. Today, there is at least one hiti in each of Bhaktapur's neighborhood totaling to about 104. (Note: A list of all hitis in Bhaktapur as published by Bhaktapur Municipality.(p. 21)) The hitis were made not only by royals and nobles, but also by common people as well. There was a common belief that building hitis and rest houses grant the builder religious merit. Hitis whose spouts face eastwards, of which there are 18, hold religious significance to the locals as it is considered pious to bathe in these spouts during Sa Paru. This practice has gone extinct today as most of these spouts do not work any longer as the canals that supplied them has been lost to time. These aqueduct-like canal system were called Rajkulo, the earliest such canal in Bhaktapur was believed to be built by a mythical queen Tulā Rāni, who according to folklore floated on water owing to her light weight. In 1379, Jayasthiti Malla repaired a damaged Rajkulo of Bhaktapur and in the same year a new one named Yaṭapāṭa was built in the city. The most famous Rajkulo of Bhaktapur was commissioned by Jitamitra Malla in 1677 that brought water from the hills of Nagarkot to the city. All of these Rajkulos in Bhaktapur have gone extinct today. Jahru are a type of water tank made out of stone which can be found around wells and hitis of the city. These are usually carved with floral motifs and the image of Bhagiratha.

=== Ponds ===
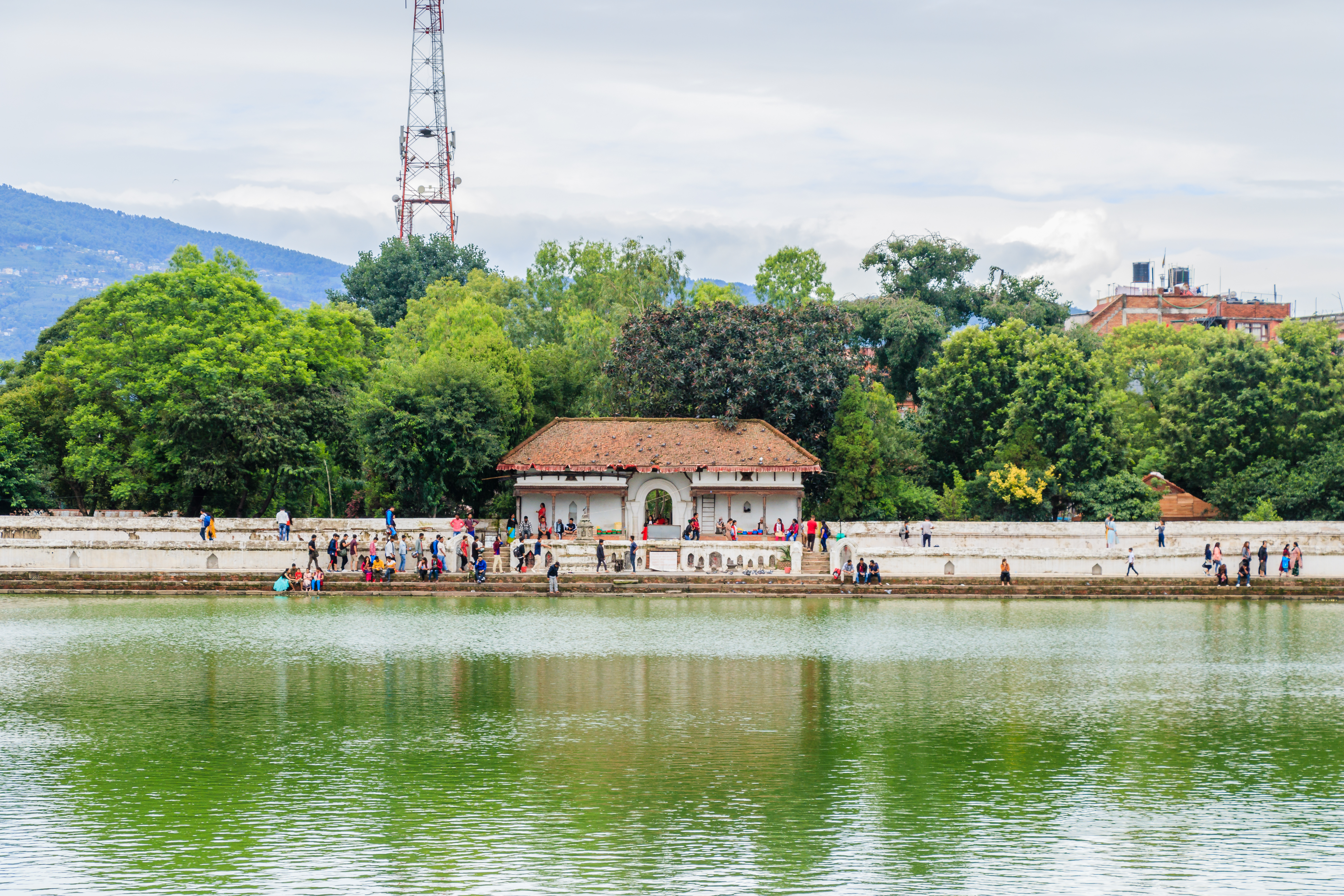
Siddha Pokhari (Newar: Taḥ pukhu)

There are 50 artificial ponds/lakes (Newar: 𑐥𑐸𑐏𑐸, pukhu), constructed in the Licchavi and the Malla dynasty, in the city. Of them the largest four, SIddha Pokhari (Taḥ pukhu), Naḥ pukhu, Bhājyā pukhu and Rani Pokhari (nhu pukhu) are located in the western part of the city and among them the largest one, Siddha Pokhari (Taḥ pukhu) measures 574×249 ft. The two oldest known ponds of the city are Taḥ pukhu and Naḥ pukhu built in 1118 and 1168 respectively. Kamal Pokhari (bāhre pukhu), another large pond on the eastern part of town is believed to be from the Licchavi dynasty, though no definitive proof has been found of its antiquity.

A lot of the smaller ponds in the dense settlements of city were built in the Malla dynasty as a sort of water supply during a fire. These ponds also have cultural and religious significance, along with agricultural ones. For instance, Kamal Pokhari (bāhre pukhu), in the local folklore, is considered the residence of Tula Rani, a mythical queen weighing only one Tula. Bhājyā pukhu, located in the western part of the city and directly south of Siddha Pokhari, is similar to Rani Pokhari of Kathmandu as both of them have an island in their centre with a temple in it. It was commissioned by Bhāju Kasa, a late 17th century official of Bhaktapur and has many folklore associated with it. Similarly, Nhu pukhu built in 1629 by Jagajjyoti Malla was popularly called Rani Pukhu, meaning queen of ponds, because of its beauty. Naḥ pukhu was believed to have built in a single night by a wizard in 1168, hence it is also called Guhya pukhu, meaning secretive pond.

=== Phalcha ===
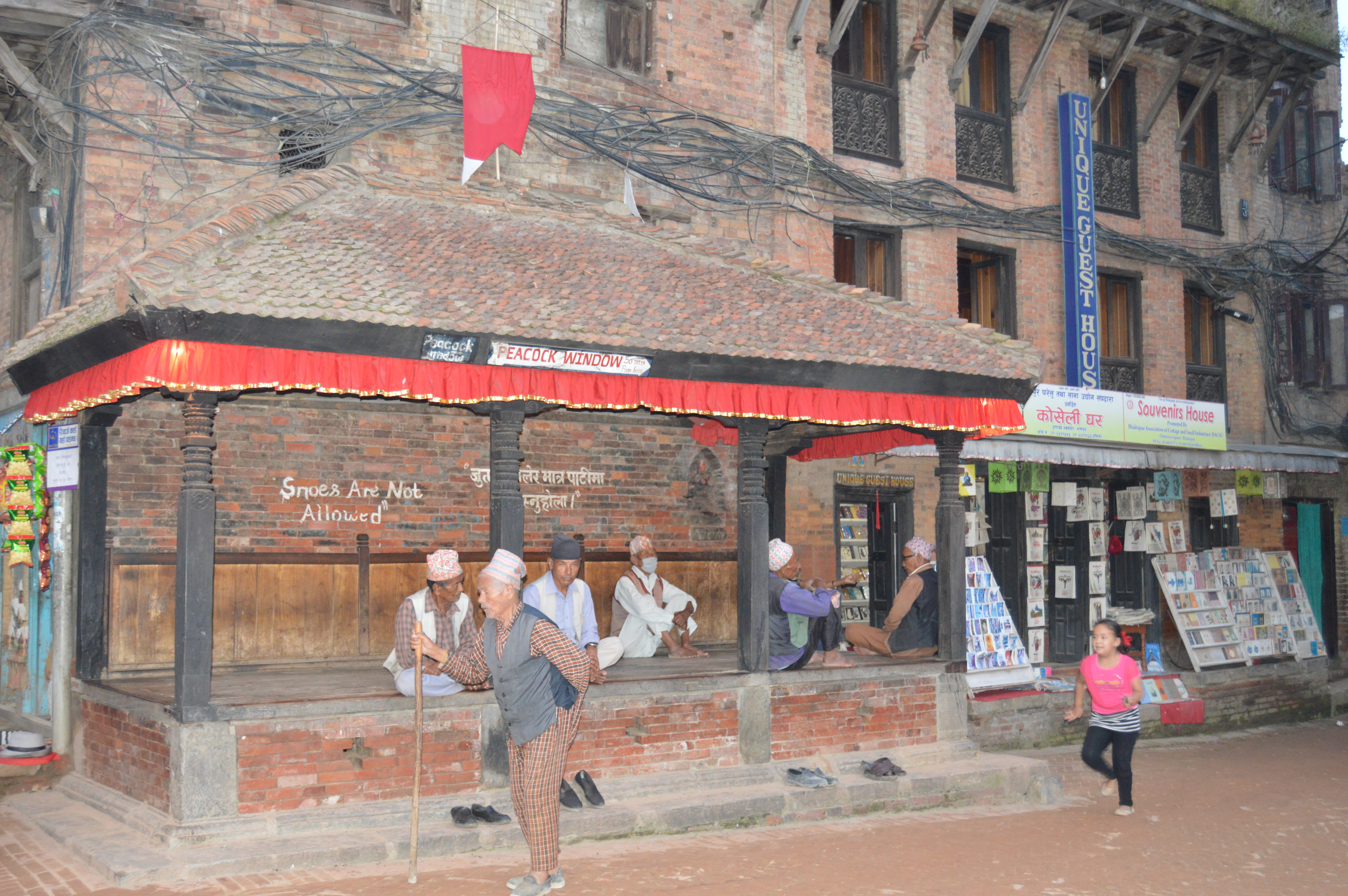
A phalchā in Bhaktapur.

Phalchā is a Newar word for communal resting places which has been a part of Nepali culture since the Lichhavi dynasty. Usually, they are attached to an existing building or free standing with their front façade colonnaded with widely spaced wooden posts. These phalchā see extensive use by the locals as a communal gathering places.

It was considered religiously pious to consecrate phalcas and today there are 364 phalcas in Bhaktapur consecrated with most dating from the Malla dynasty. The two largest ones are located in Bhaktapur Durbar Square, the former royal palace square. Mandapa and Sattal are another type of rest houses found in Nepal. Mandapa, like a phalchā, is a thatch-roofed platform but they are always free-standing and have sixteen colonnades, four on each side. Many mandapa in Bhaktapur have a second storey like the Chyāsilim mandapa of Bhaktapur Durbar Square. Sattal are almost always multi-storied public buildings which serves as a shrine for a deity and in the past was used as a habitation for pilgrims and travelers.

== Language ==
Bhaktapur Newar (𑐏𑑂𑐰𑐥𑑅 𑐨𑐵𑐫𑑂, khvapaḥ bhāy) is a distinct dialect of the Newar language spoken in Bhaktapur and its environs. Generally, the vocabulary is similar to that of the standard dialect (standard refers to the Newar spoken in Kathmandu and Lalitpur) with some pronunciation changes but differences do exist. The most widely known difference is for the word laḥ (𑐮𑑅, "water") which becomes nā (𑐣𑐵) in the Bhaktapur dialect. This difference is often used humorously as nā in the standard dialect means "mud" and laḥ in the Bhaktapur dialect means "drool". Terminologies relating to traditional musical instruments are also different between the two dialects. In a lot of words, the "ā" sound in the standard dialect is replaced with "a" sound and vice versa. Similarly, Bhaktpaur Newar has a voiced velar nasal sound '𑐒', that is not present in the standard dialect. For instance, the Nyatapola is called as "𑐒𑐵𑐟𑐵𑐥𑑀𑐮" (ṅātāpola) in Bhaktapur whereas in the standard dialect its name is "𑐣𑑂𑐫𑐵𑐟𑐵𑐥𑐿𑐵"(nyātāpau).

=== Literature ===
A section of Briddhi Lakshmi's ka kha yā mye(𑐎 𑐏 𑐫𑐵 𑐩𑑂𑐫𑐾), which is considered to be one of the greatest poems of the Newar language.

Jagat Sundar Malla, born in 1882 is considered one of the Four Pillars of Nepal Bhasa who headed a revival campaign of Nepal Bhasa after its supersession by the royal government. Similarly, Ram Sekhar Nakarmi who was a major modern day Nepal Bhasa writer was also from Bhaktapur. Narayan Man Bijukchhe is also a prominent author, mostly writing political books in the Nepali language.

Before Nepal Bhasa became the official language in the Malla dynasty, most literature was written in Sanskrit and even during the Malla dynasty, Sanskrit was an important literary language. Historical documents written in the Newar language first began appearing since the 14th century. Many literary pieces were written in the Newar language in Bhaktapur during the Malla dynasty. The influential Gopal Raj Vamshavali, a book about the history of Nepal was written in Bhaktapur by an anonymous writer from Panauti. Like other artworks, most literature of Bhaktapur before the 20th century were written by anonymous authors and are generally attributed to the ruling monarch because it was a common practice to mention a monarch's name. However, the names of a few non royal writers from Bhaktapur are known. For instance, two poems written by Keshav Udās is still preserved in the National Archives of Nepal. He was active from 1604 to 1611 and both of his remaining works are romantic narrative poems. Among royal writers, Ranajit Malla and his queen consort Briddhi Lakshmi who are among the most popular historical authors, the former mostly remembered for his plays and the later for her poems. Ranajit Malla's "hāya hāya rāma rāma" and Briddhi Lakshmi's "ka kha yā mye" are noted for their historical as well as literary importance. (Note: Both of these poems can be found here (For Briddhi Lakshmi's work, see pg 36 and for Ranajit Malla's work see pg 38))

== Main sights ==
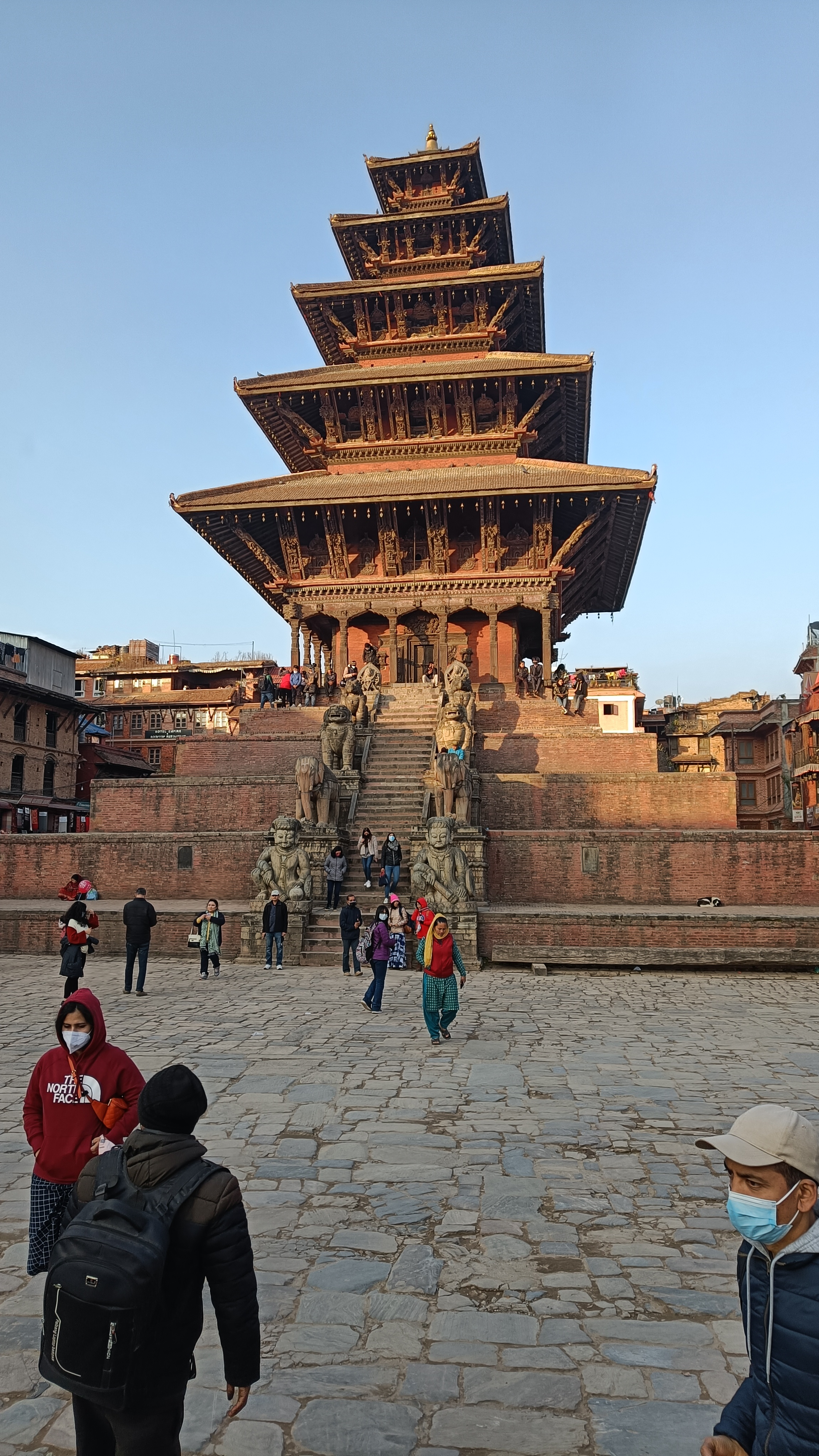
The Nyatapola temple, built during the reign of King Bhupatindra Malla is the tallest temple of Nepal

Bhaktapur is one of the most visited sites of Nepal popular among both foreign and domestic visitors. The most visited site of Bhaktapur are the city's four squares, which all except for one are concentrated on the middle part of Bhaktapur. The first of them is the Durbar Square, the former royal palace complex of Bhaktapur, composed of houses of the former royal palace and various temples that were built in its vicinity. Although, the Durbar Square of Bhaktapur received heavy damage from both the 1934 and 2015 earthquake, while many of the fallen monuments have been reconstructed. The Durbar square houses various monuments like the palace of fifty five windows, the Simhādhwākhā Lyākū palace which houses the National Art Gallery, one of the first museum of Nepal, and the stone temples of Vatsala Devi and Siddhi Lakshmi. The temple of Silu Māhādeo (meaning "the Shiva of Silu") located on the eastern part of Bhaktapur Durbar Square is the tallest Shikhara style building in Nepal.

=== Taumadhi Square ===
The Taumadhi Square (𑐟𑑅𑐩𑐵𑐬𑐷, Tamārhi) houses the Nyatapola temple, the five storeyed temple commissioned by King Bhupatindra Malla and shrines for the tantric goddess Siddhi Lakshmi, the personal deity of the royal couple. Under the shadow of Nyatapola stands the three storey temple associated with Bhairava which was first built by Vishva Malla and then later remodeled by Jagajjyoti Malla in its present form. The square also contains the courtyard of Til Mādhav Narayana, the Aesāmārhi satta (often called the Kasthamandap of Bhaktapur), the Betala temple and a golden hiti. The Shikhara temple of Jagannath and the roofed temple of Lakshmi Narasimha are also established near the square.

=== Dattatraya Square ===
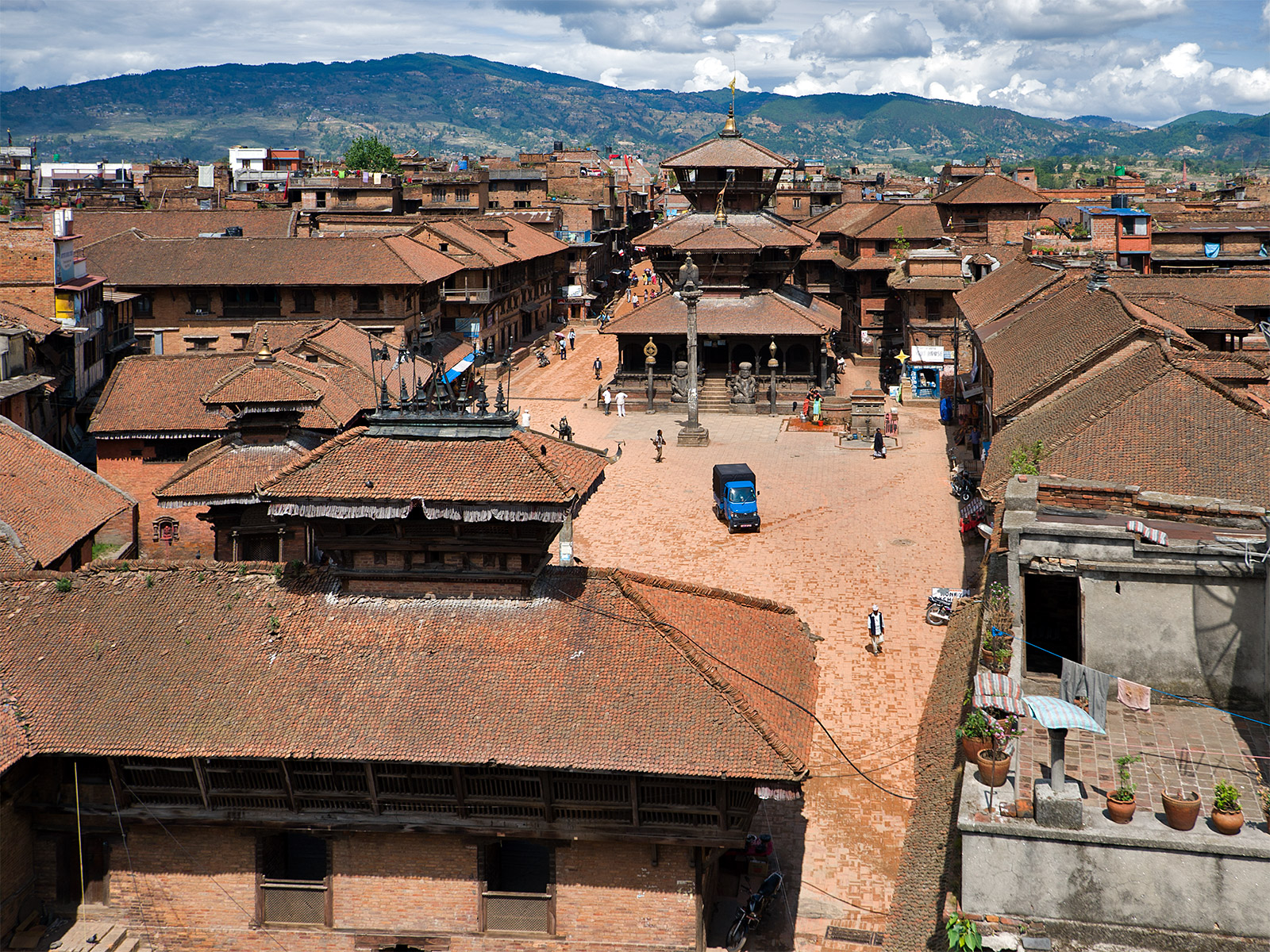
Tachapāl square on the eastern part of Bhaktapur is also known as the Dattaterya square

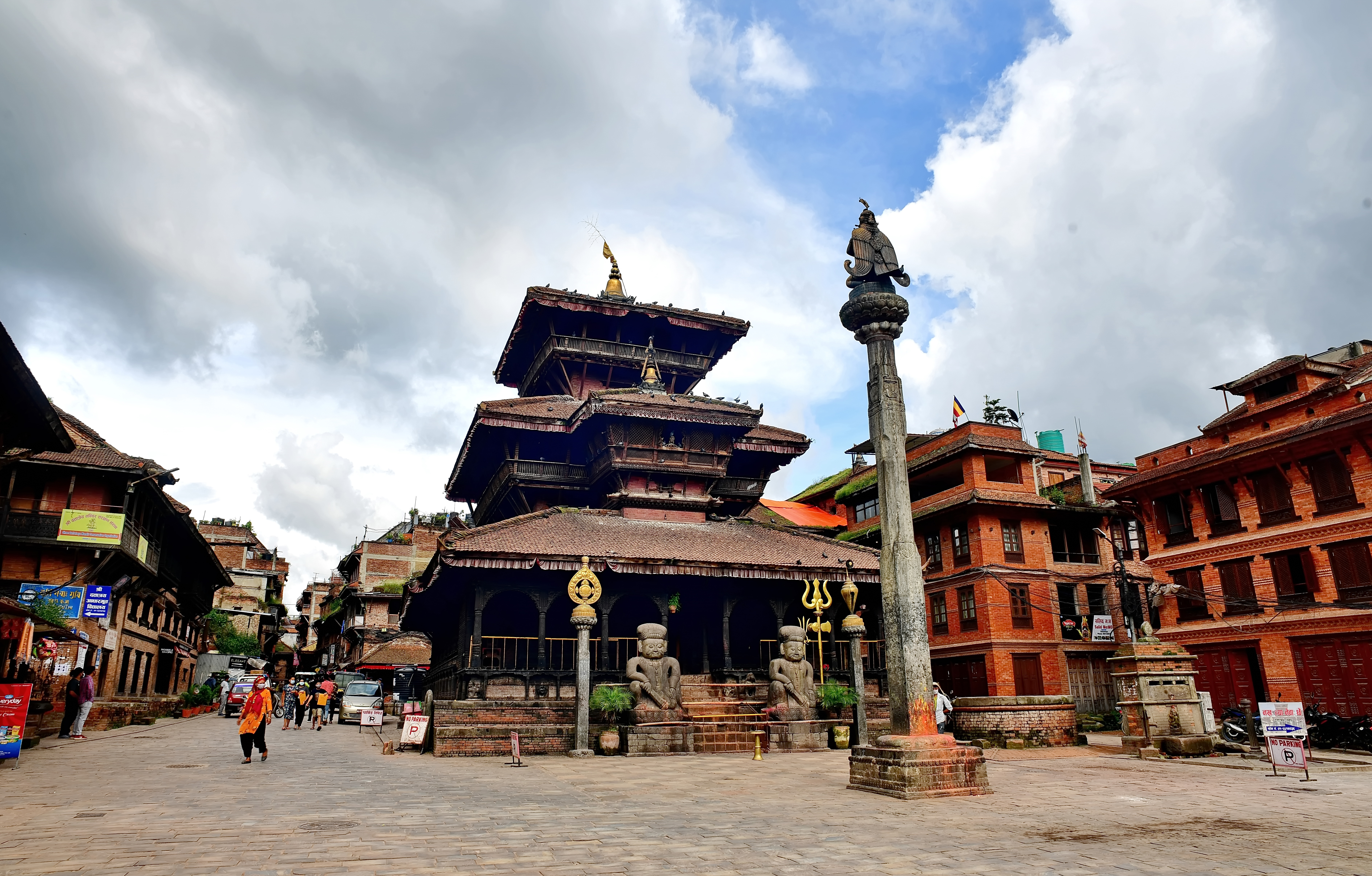
The Dattatraya Temple

The Dattatraya Square located in the Tachapal tole is one of the oldest monument of the town. The Dattatraya Square consists of the three-story pagoda-style Dattatraya Temple, dedicated to Guru Dattatreya, which is the combined form and avatar of three principal Hindu deities, (Brahma the creator, Vishnu the preserver, and Maheswora the destroyer, respectively), was built during the reign of King Yaksha Malla (1428 A.D. – 1482 A.D.) and was opened to the public around 1486 A.D., only after his demise. The exact date of construction of the Dattatraya temple is still obscure. This temple, according to popular belief, was constructed from a single piece of wood from one tree. At the entrance are two large sculptures of the Jaiput wrestlers(locally known as kutuwo), Jaimala and Pata (as in the Nyatapola Temple), a "Chakra", and a gilded metal statue of Garuda, a bird-like divinity. Around the temple are wood carved panels with erotic decorations. It was subsequently repaired and renovated by King Vishwa Malla in 1548 A.D. The Dattatraya Square is also the home to the Pujari Math which was the former palace of the Malla Kings and court and later served as the settlement for the priests of the temple and Tibetan traders. Today, the Pujari Math has been converted into a Woodcraft and Bronze Museum. The Pujari Matha is mostly noted for its artistic windows including the popular Mhaykhā Jhyā (lit. Peacock Window). In front of the Dattatraya temple is the Bhimsena Temple, which is dedicated to Bhin:dyo, the Newari deity of commerce often confused with the Pandava brother Bhimsena.

=== Changu Narayan ===
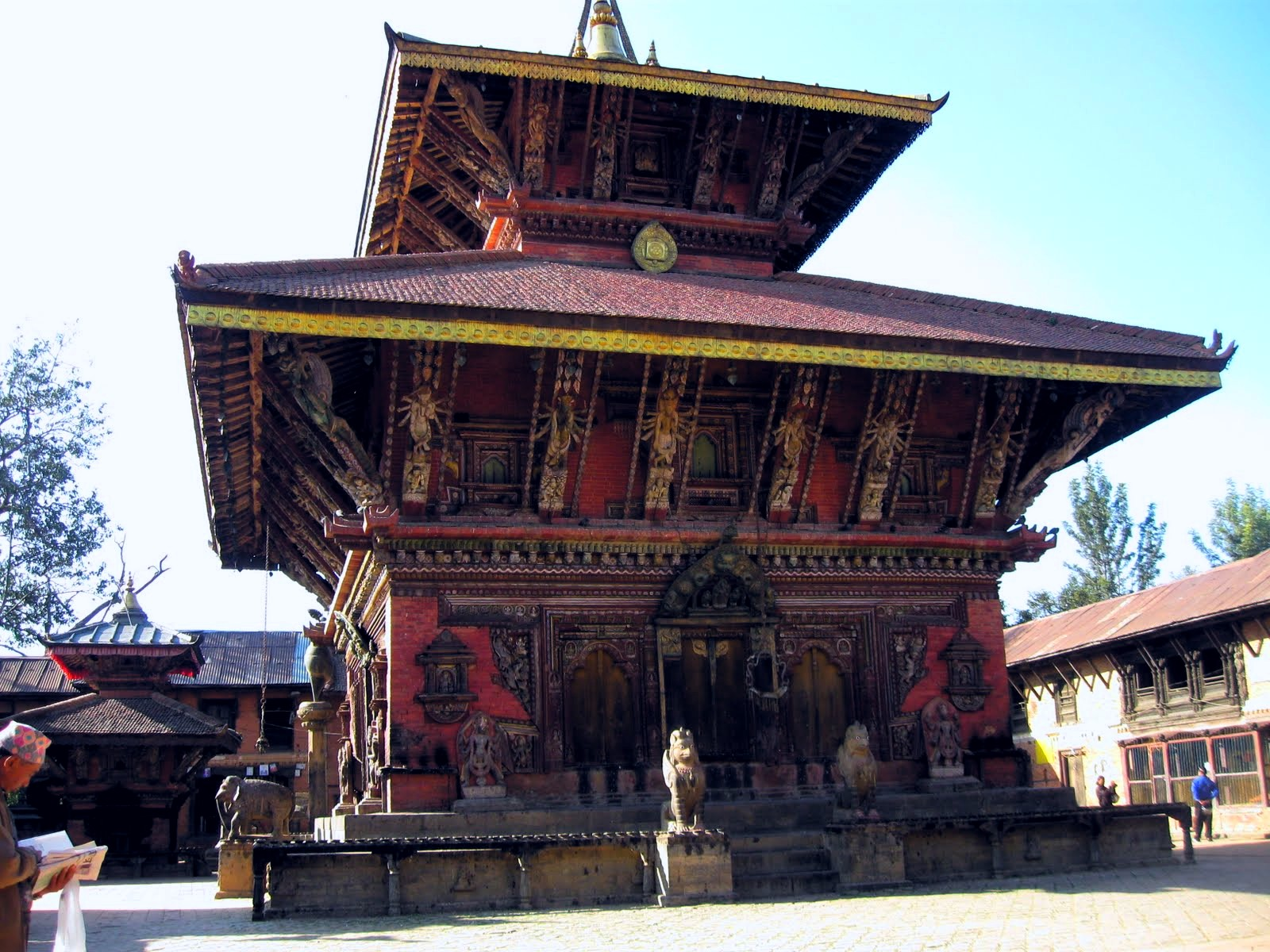
Front face of Changu Narayan temple

Changu Narayan is an ancient Hindu temple located near the modern village of Changunarayan in the Kathmandu Valley on top of a hill at the eastern end of the valley. It is 6 kilometres (3.7 mi) to the north of Bhakathapur and 22 kilometres (14 mi) from Kathmandu. The temple is one of the oldest Hindu temples of the valley and is believed to have been constructed first in the 4th century. Changu Narayan is named after Vishnu, and the temple is dedicated to him. A stone slab discovered in the vicinity of the temple dates to the 5th century and is the oldest such stone inscription discovered in Nepal. It was rebuilt after the old temple was devastated. Many of the stone sculptures date to the Licchavi period. Changu Narayan Temple is listed by UNESCO as a World Heritage Site.

The temple is a double-roofed structure where the idol of Lord Vishnu in his incarnation as Narayana is enshrined. The temple has intricate roof struts showing multi-armed Tantric deities. A kneeling image of Garuda (dated to the 5th century), the vahana or vehicle of Vishnu with a snake around its neck, faces the temple. The gilded door depicts stone lions guarding the temple. Gilded windows also flank the door. A conch and a disc, symbols of Vishnu, are carved on the two pillars at the entrance. Non-Hindus are not allowed to enter the temple.

== In popular culture ==
In 1974, Pier Paolo Pasolini used Bhaktapur, along with other places in Nepal, as locations for his film Il fiore delle Mille e una notte (Arabian Nights).

Portions of the 1993 Hollywood film Little Buddha starring Keanu Reeves and Bridget Fonda were filmed in the Bhaktapur Durbar Square. Also, some portions of Indian films Hare Rama Hare Krishna and Baby were shot in Bhaktapur.

== Sister Cities ==
- Pyongsong, North Korea
- Shannan, China

On 13 December 2023, Bhaktapur and Leshan, China signed a Memorandum of understanding regarding establishing a sisterly relation between the two cities.

== Notable people ==
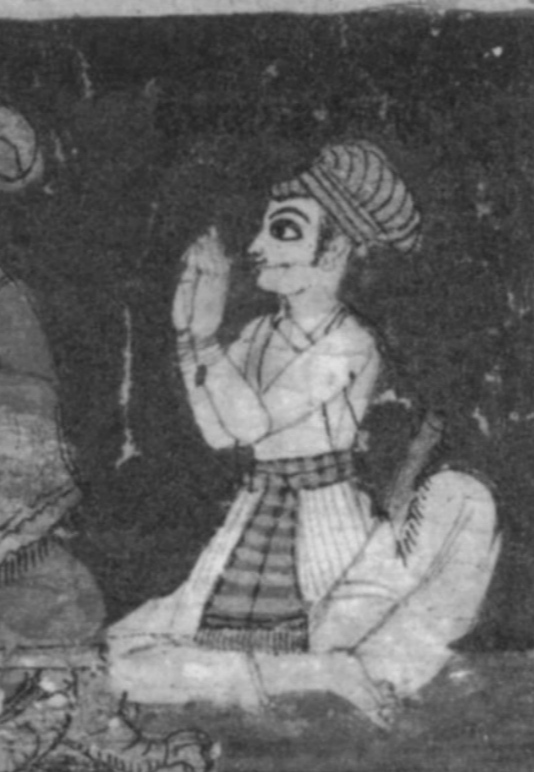
Bhāju Kasa

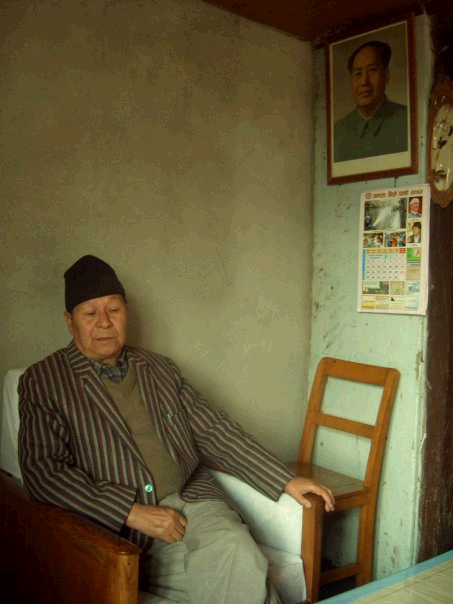
Narayan Man Bijukchhe

- Devalakshmidevi, ruler
- Yaksha Malla, ruler
- Ganga Rani, 16th century queen
- Bhāju Kasa, 18th century minister
- Bhupatindra Malla, ruler
- Ranajit Malla, ruler and Newar language writer
- Briddhi Lakshmi, queen consort and Newar language poet
- Padma Sundar Malla, electrical engineer and the first Nepalese to visit the US
- Jagat Sundar Malla, activist and Newar language writer
- Bharat Jangam, writer
- Narayan Man Bijukchhe, politician and writer
- Prem Suwal, politician and a Member of Parliament
- Sunil Prajapati, politician and incumbent mayor of Bhaktapur
- Gita Shahi, actress

== See also ==
- Battle of Bhaktapur
- Bhaktapur Durbar Square
- Nyatapola Temple
- Kailashnath Mahadev Statue

== Gallery ==
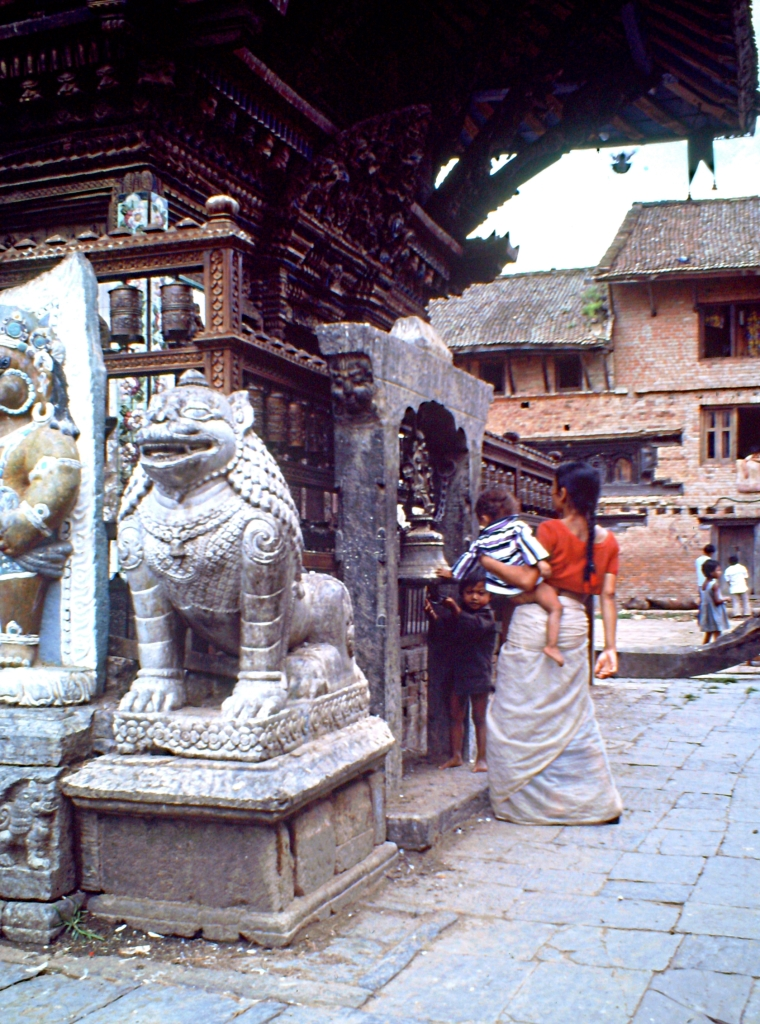
Street scene, Bhaktapur, Nepal. 1979

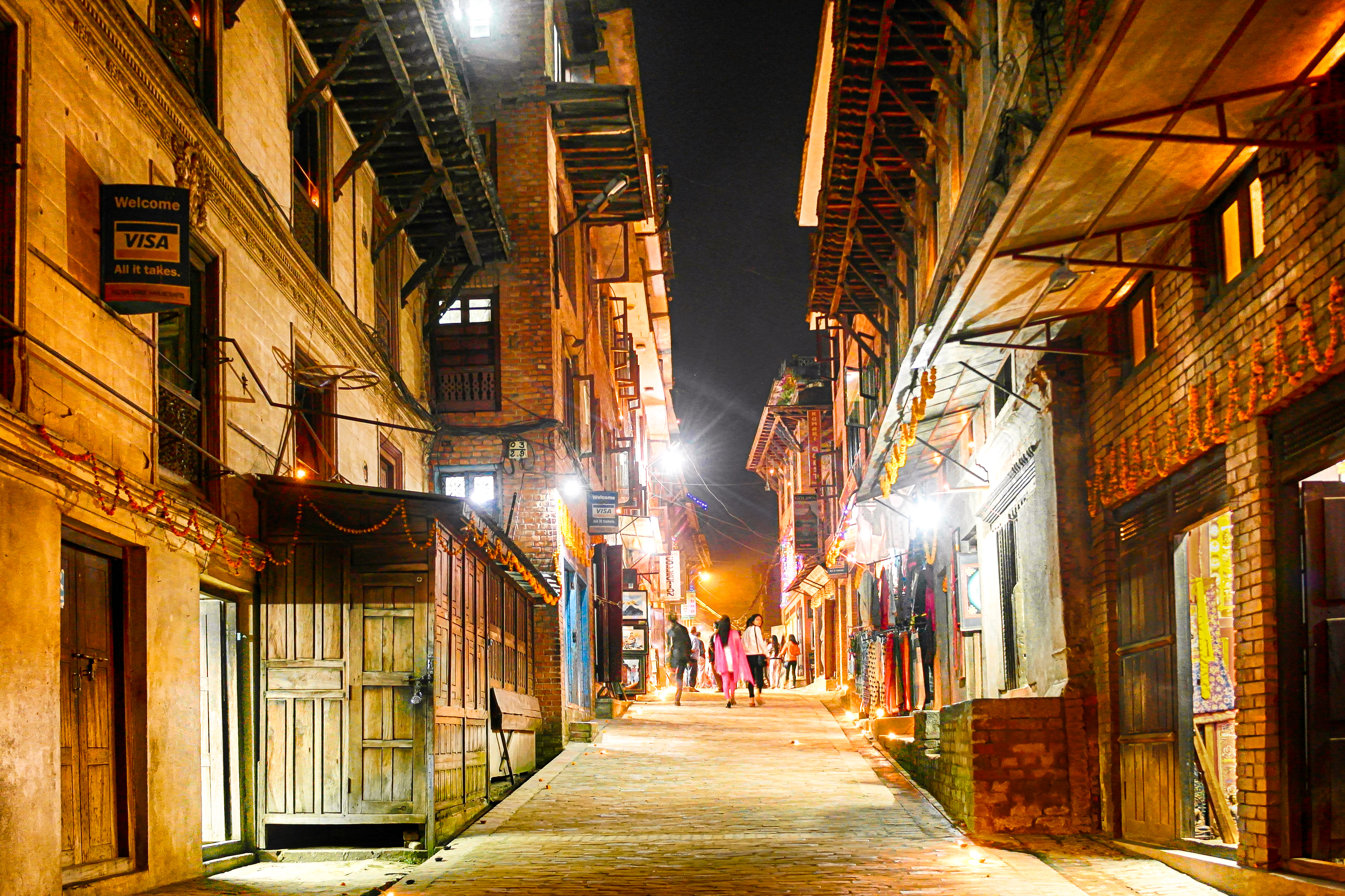
Street of Bhaktapur at night

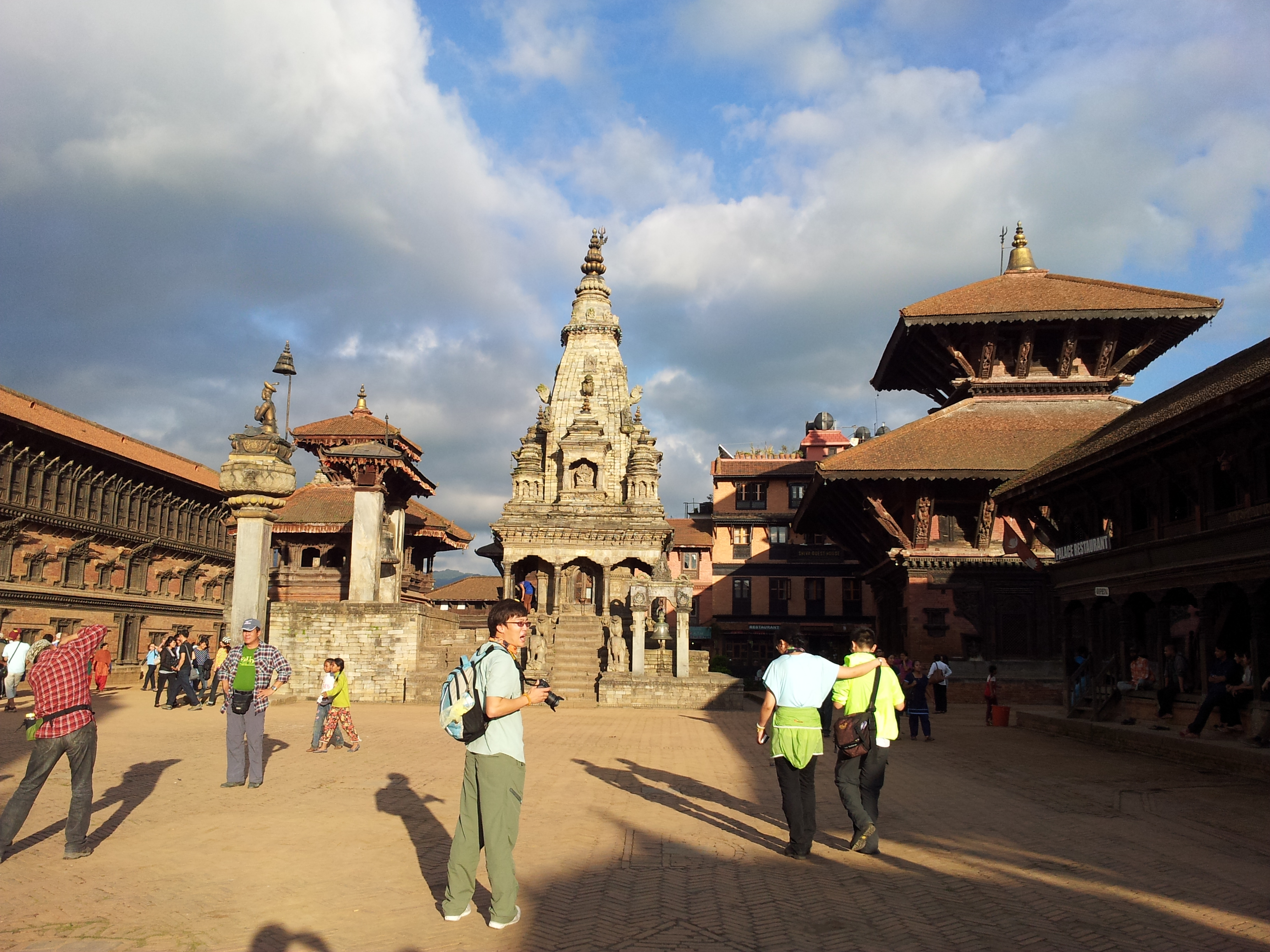
Bhaktapur Durbar Square

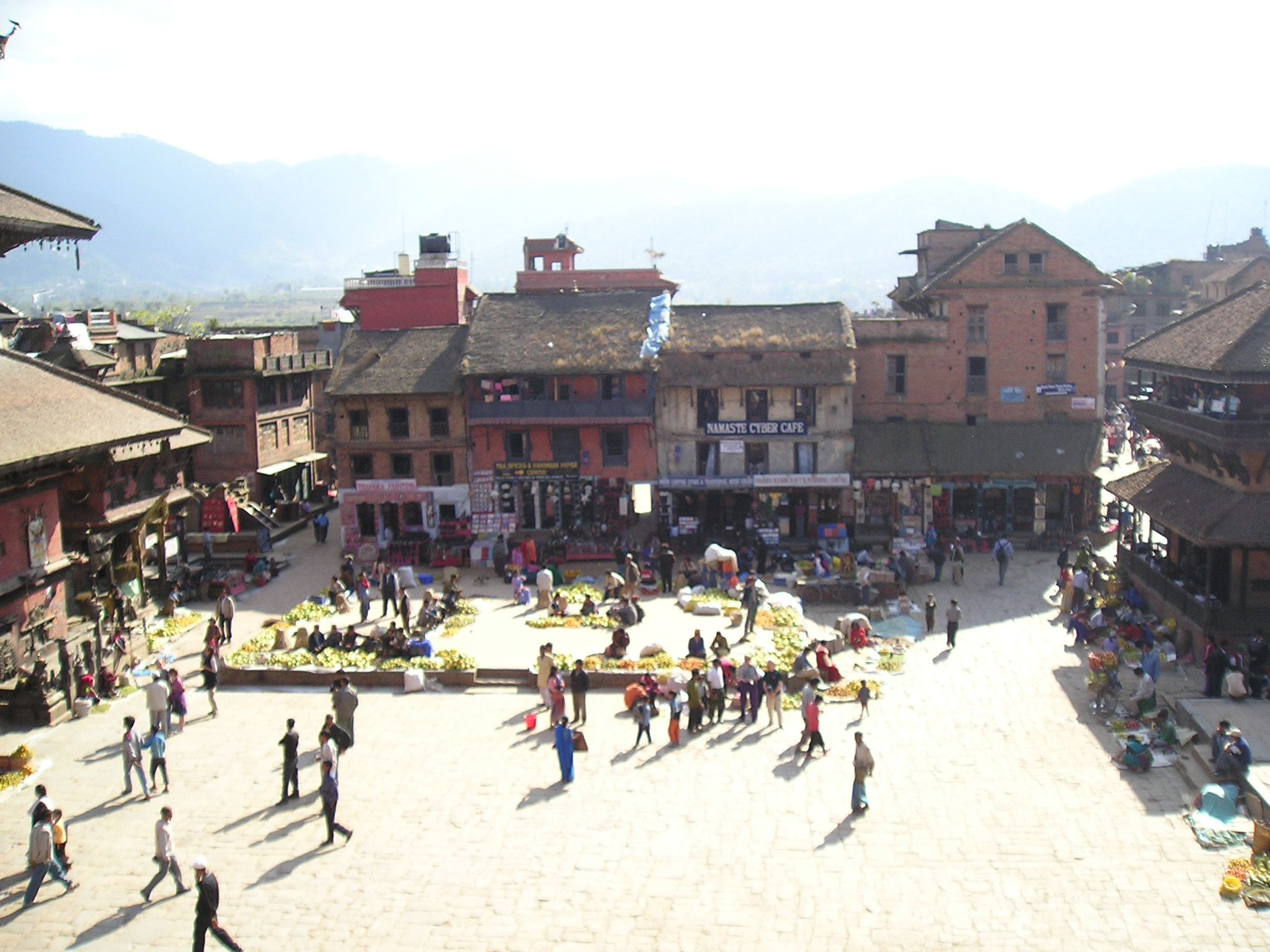
Bhaktapur Taumadhi square.

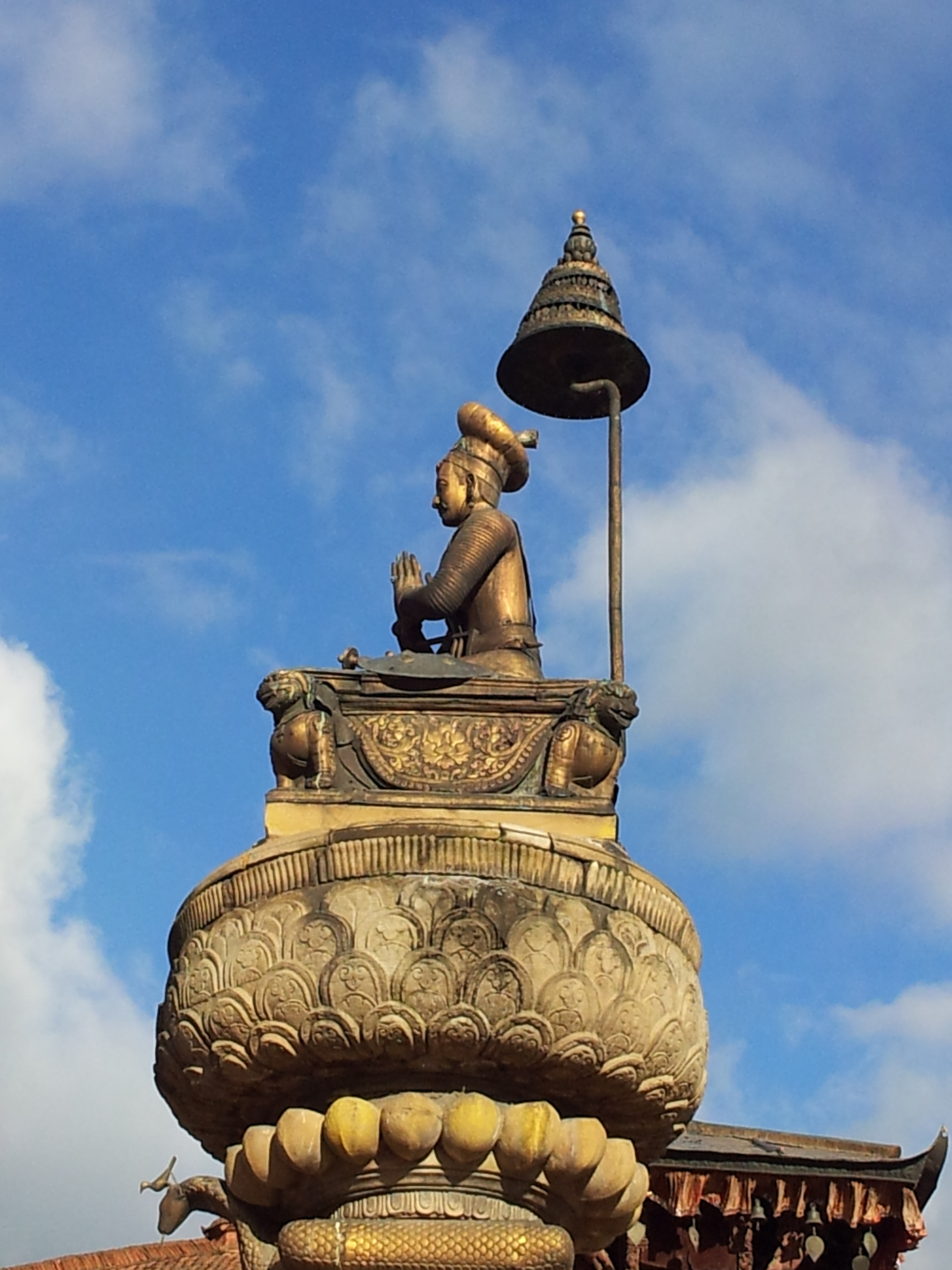
Statue of King Bhupatindra Malla at Bhaktapur Durbar Square

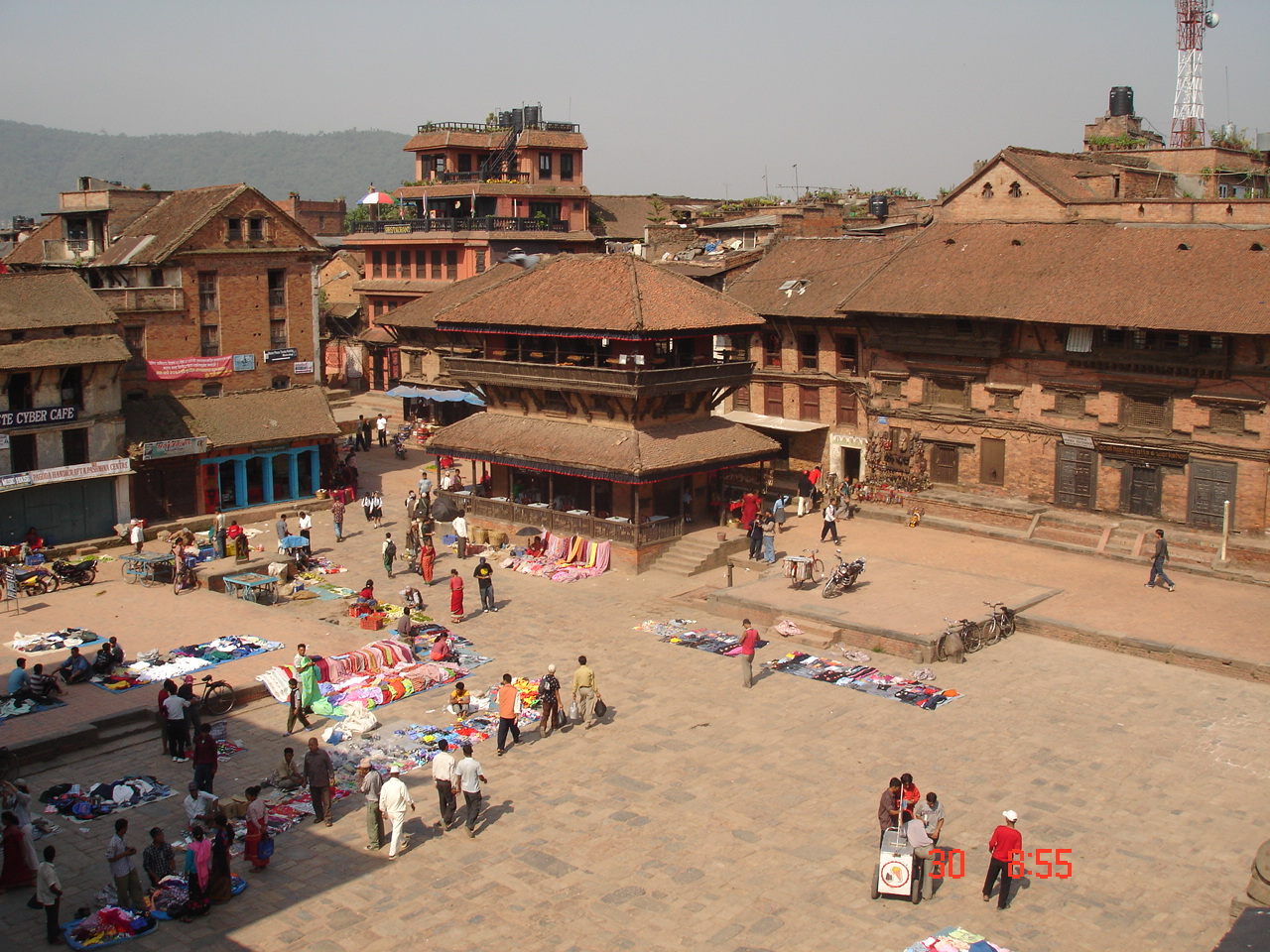
Aerial view of Taumadhi square

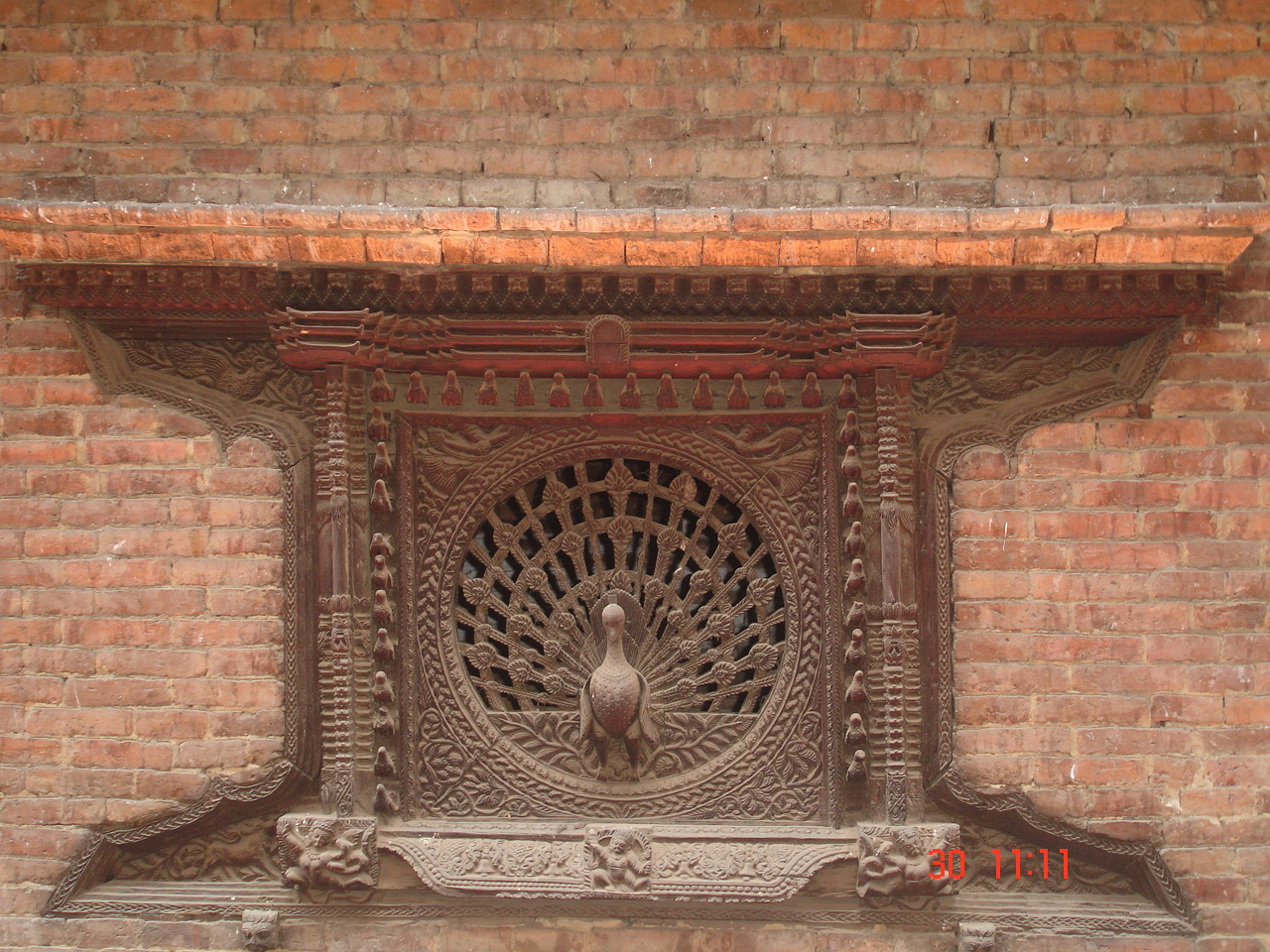
Peacock Window

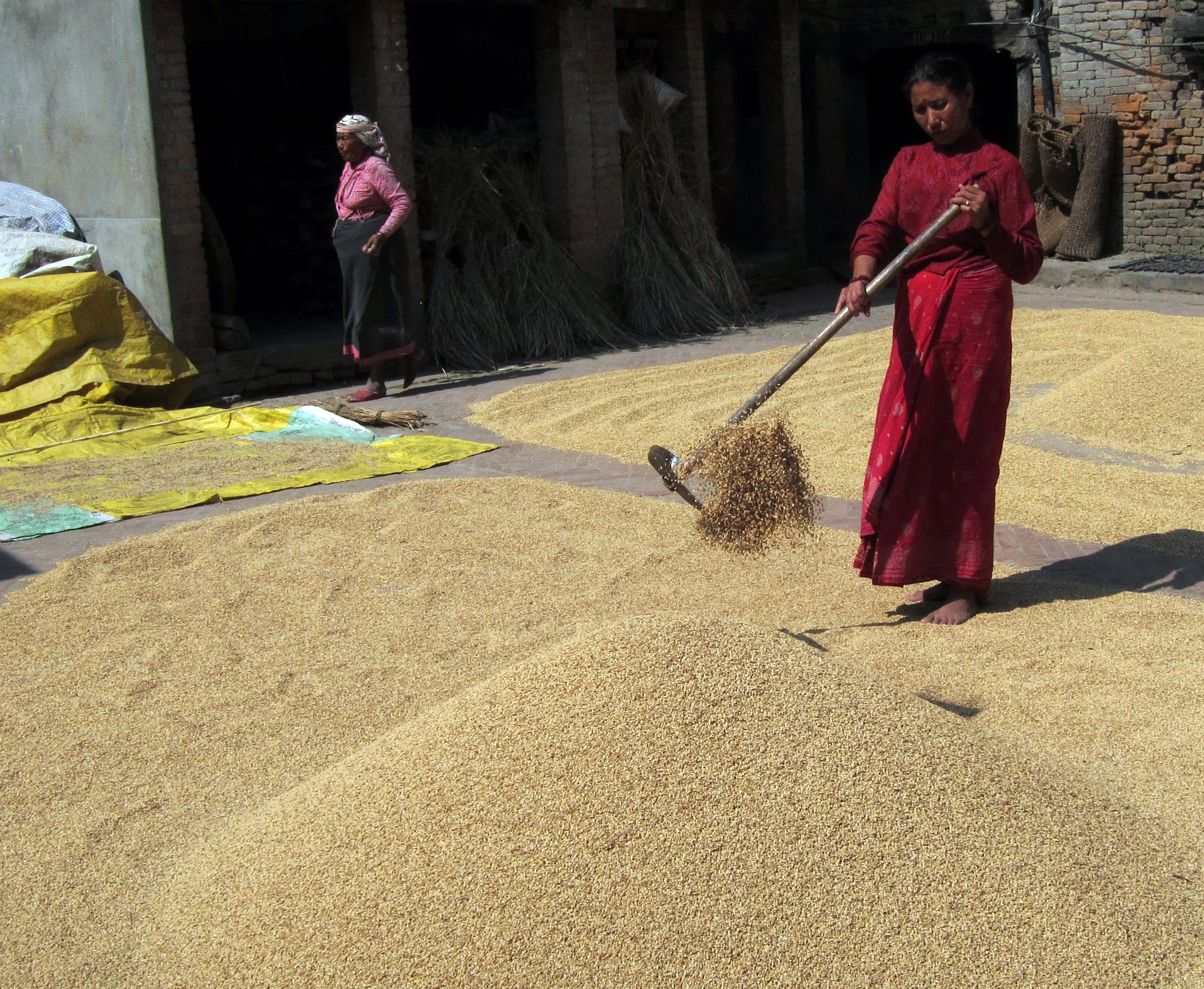
Woman drying rice

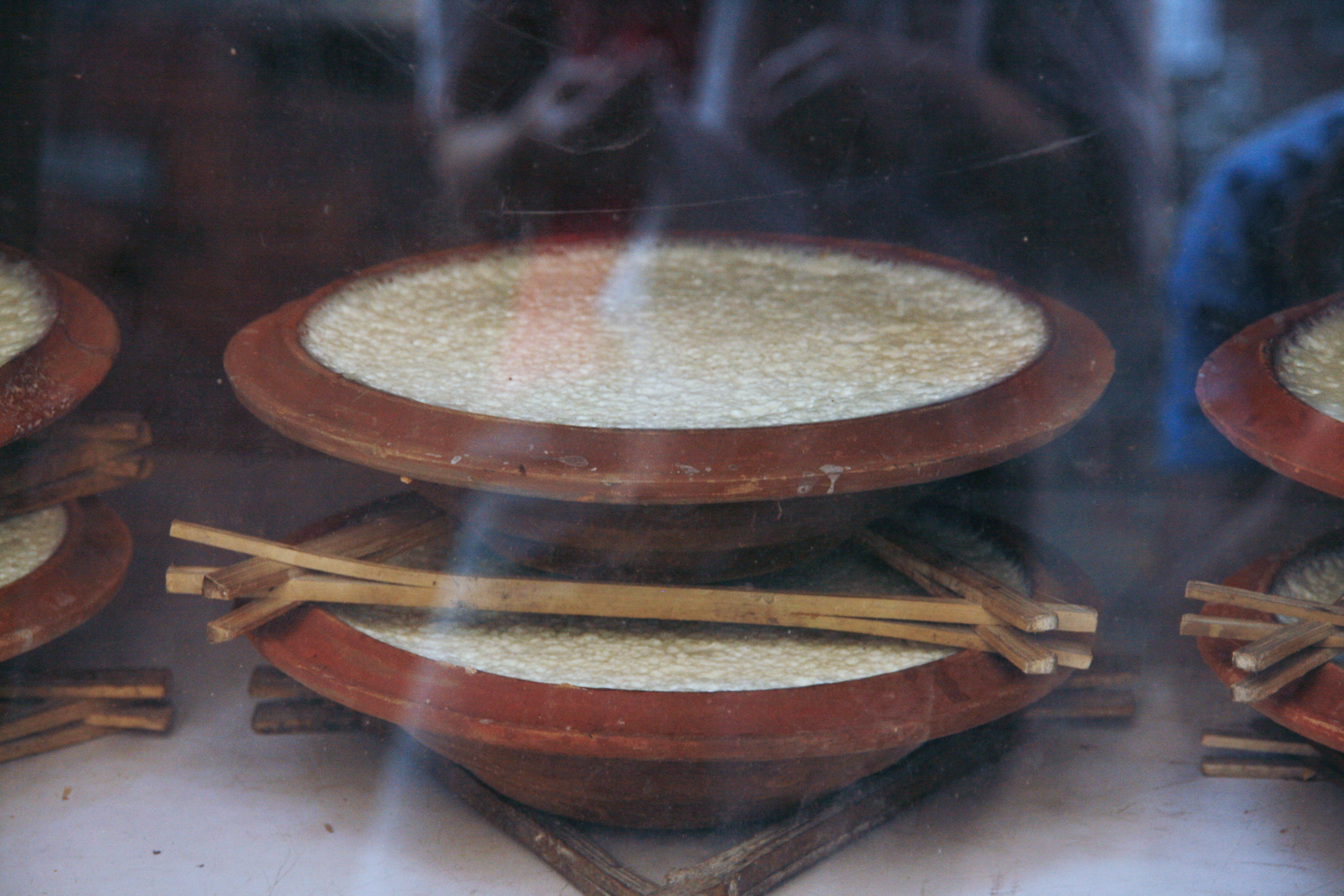
Newari king curd (Juju Dhau)

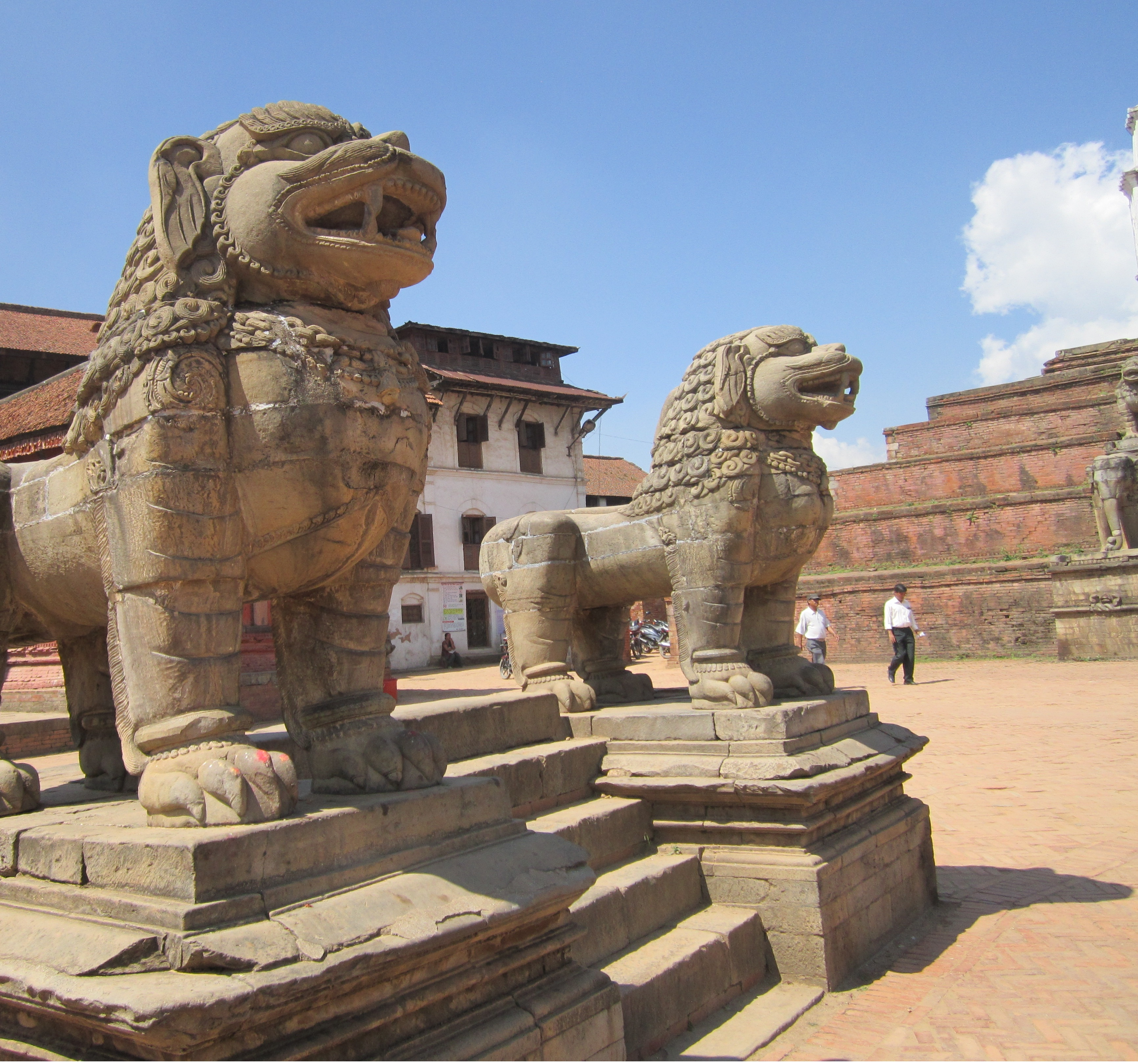
Bhaktapur Durbar Square

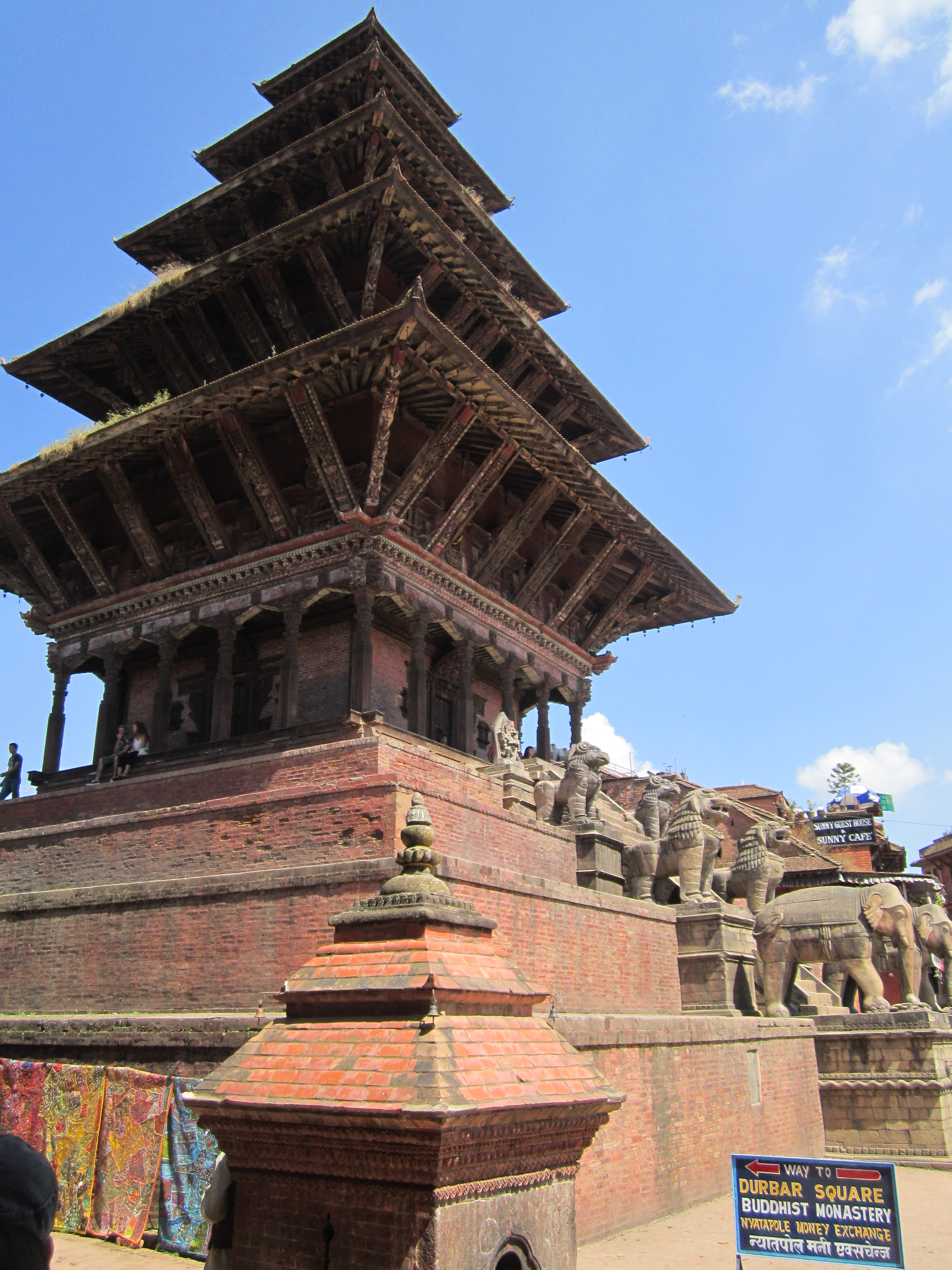
Nyatapola Temple

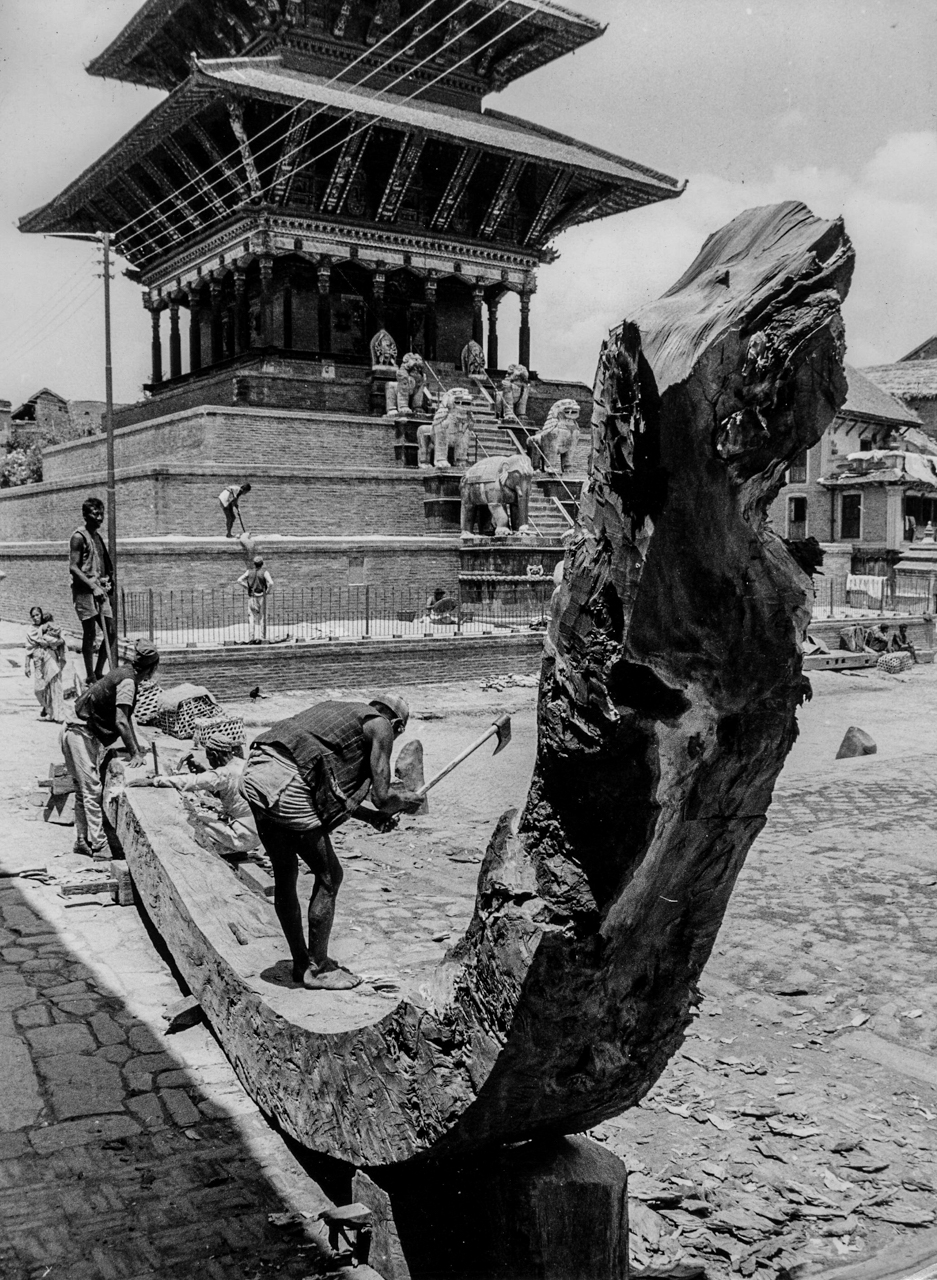
Festival preparations
