= Rajkulo =

Type of canal in Nepal

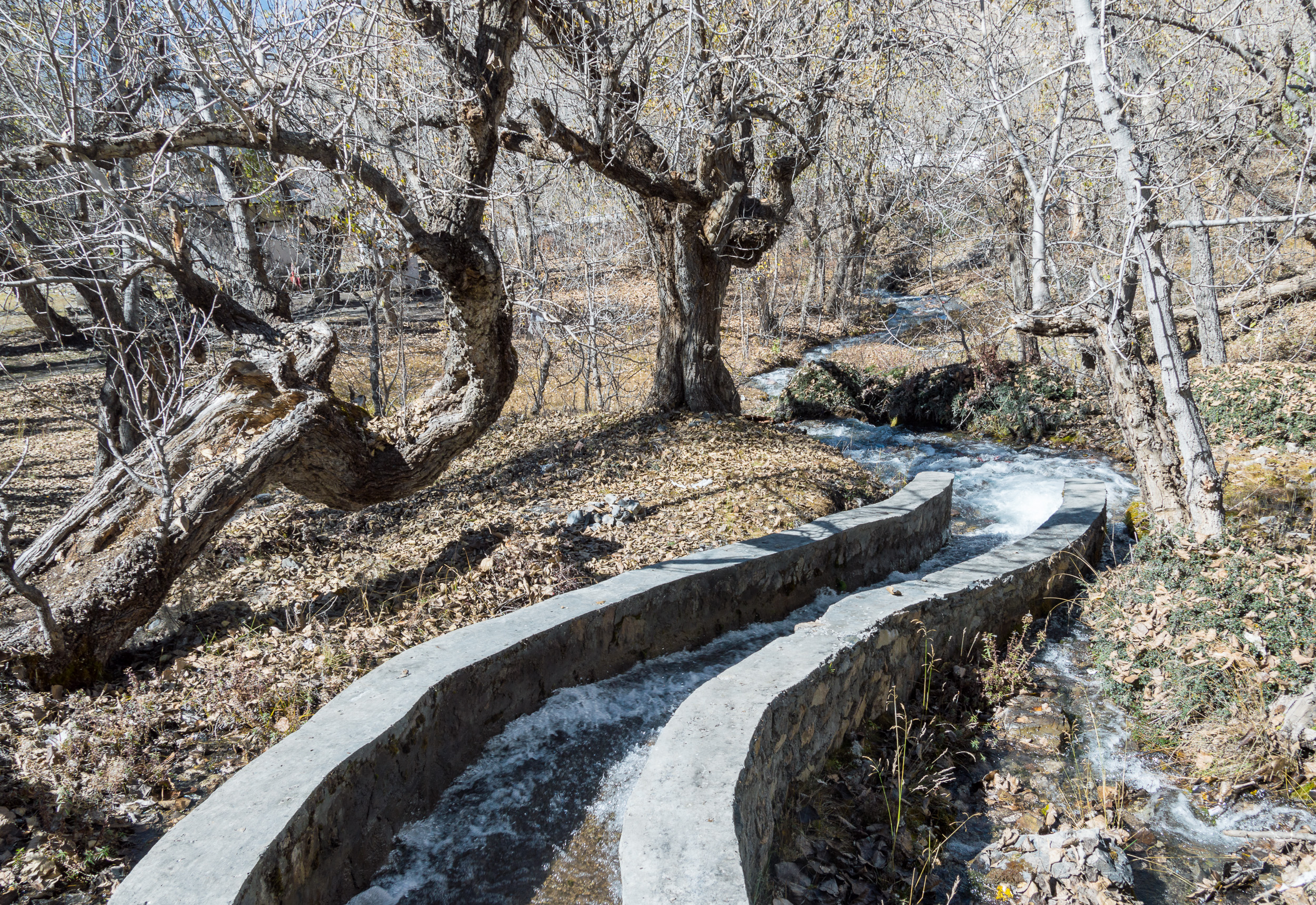
A canal in Muktinath similar to a rajkulo.

A rajkulo (lit. 'royal canal') is a type of canal found in Nepal. It provides water for Irrigation, dhunge dharas, and ponds, and it can be dated back to the Lichhavi era (c450-c750 CE).

== Early royal canals ==
The earliest known canals were built during the Licchavi era. At the time they were referred to as tilamaka and their primary purpose was irrigation. All of these canals have now disappeared.

== Notable rajkulos ==
During the 17th century the kings of Kathmandu, Patan and Bhaktapur commissioned long-distance canals to bring water from the foothills of the Kathmandu valley to their cities.

=== Tikabhairav Canal ===
The Tikabhairav Canal transported water from Lele and Naldu rivers to the Patan Durbar Square complex.

=== Bageswori Canal ===
The Bageswori Canal brought water from the spring of Mahadev Pokhari to Bhaktapur.

In 1678 King Jitamitra Malla built a rajkulo to bring water to Bhaktapur. Although the primary objective of the canal was to have water for worship in the Taleju temple, it was also used for irrigation, for watermills and for fishing along the way. About half of the dhunge dharas of Bhaktapur received their water from the canal.

=== Budhikanta Canal ===
The Budhikanta Canal brought water to Kathmandu. King Pratap Malla also needed the water for religious reasons. The canal is no longer operational.

== See also ==
- Dhunge dhara
- Department of Water Resources and Irrigation
