= List of state leaders in 18th-century South Asia and its predecessor states =

This is a list of state leaders in the 18th century (1701–1800)

These polities are often sovereign states and then vassal states under a subsidiary alliance to the Maratha Confederacy or British East India Company. Afghan monarchies and non-British colonies are listed at List of state leaders in the 18th century#Asia: South.

== Bengal and Northeast India ==
- Ahom kingdom (complete list) –

- Sukhrungphaa, King (1696–1714)
- Sutanphaa, King (1714–1744)
- Sunenphaa, King (1744–1751)
- Suremphaa, King (1751–1769)
- Sunyeophaa, King (1769–1780)
- Suhitpangphaa, King (1780–1795)
- Suklingphaa, King (1795–1811)

- Bengal Subah (complete list) –

- Murshid Quli Khan, Nawab (1717–1727)
- Sarfaraz Khan, Nawab (1727–1727)
- Shuja-ud-Din Muhammad Khan, Nawab (1727–1739)
- Sarfaraz Khan, Nawab (1739–1740)
- Alivardi Khan, Nawab (1740–1756)
- Siraj ud-Daulah, Nawab (1756–1757)
- Jafar Ali Khan, Nawab (1757–1760, 1763–1765)
- Qasim, Nawab (1760–1763)
- Najmuddin Ali Khan, Nawab (1765–1766)
- Najabat Ali Khan, Nawab (1766–1770)
- Ashraf Ali Khan, Nawab (1770)
- Mubarak Ali Khan, Nawab (1770–1793)
- Baber Ali Khan, Nawab (1793–1810)

- Bhurshut (complete list) –

- Lakshminarayan, Maharaja (c.1695–1712)

- Cooch Behar (complete list) –

- Rup Narayan, Raja (1693–1714)
- Upendra Narayana, Raja (1714–1763)
- Debendra Narayana, Raja (1763–1765)
- Regent (1763–1765)
- Dhairjendra Narayan, Raja (1765–1770, 1775–1783)
- Rajendra I Narayan, Raja (1770–1772)
- Pensuthma, Regent (1770–1772)
- Dharendra Narayan, Raja (1772, 1774–1775)
- Bijendra Narayan, Raja (1772–1774)
- Regents (1783–1801)
- Harendra Narayan, Raja (1783–1839)

- Jaintia Kingdom –

- Ram Singh I, King (1694–1708)
- Jay Narayan, King (1708–1731)
- Bar Gosain, King (1731–1770)
- Chattra Singh, King (1770–1780)
- Bijay Narayan, King (1780–1790)
- Ram Singh II, King (1790–1832)

- Mallabhum (complete list) –

- Durjan Singha Dev, King (1682–1702)
- Raghunath Singha Dev II, King (1702–1712)
- Gopal Singha Dev, King (1712–1748)
- Chaitanya Singha Dev, King (1748–1801)

- Kingdom of Manipur (complete list) –

- Chalailongpa, King (1697–1709)
- Gharib Nawaz, King (1709–1754)
- Chit Sain, King (1754–1756)
- Gaurisiam, King (1756–1763)
- Ching-Thang Khomba, King (1764–1798)
- Rohinchandra, King (1798–1801)

- Kingdom of Sikkim (complete list) –

- Chakdor Namgyal, Chogyal (1700–1717)
- Gyurmed Namgyal, Chogyal (1717–1733)
- Phuntsog Namgyal II, Chogyal (1733–1780)
- Tenzing Namgyal, Chogyal (1780–1793)
- Tsugphud Namgyal, Chogyal (1793–1863)

- Twipra Kingdom –

- Dharma Manikya II, King (1714–1733)
- Vijay Manikya III, King (1743–1760)
- Krishna Manikya, King (1760–1761)
- Rajdhar Manikya, King (1783–1804)

== Bhutan ==
- Bhutan (complete list) –

- Gedun Chomphel, Druk Desis (1695–1701)
- Ngawang Tshering, Druk Desis (1701–1704)
- Umze Peljor, Druk Desis (1704–1707)
- Druk Rabgye, Druk Desis (1707–1719)
- Ngawang Gyamtsho, Druk Desis (1719–1729)
- Mipham Wangpo, Druk Desis (1729–1736)
- Khuwo Peljor, Druk Desis (1736–1739)
- Ngawang Gyaltshen, Druk Desis (1739–1744)
- Sherab Wangchuck, Druk Desis (1744–1763)
- Druk Phuntsho, Druk Desis (1763–1765)
- Wangzob Druk Tenzin I, Druk Desis (1765–1768)
- Sonam Lhundub, Druk Desis (1768–1773)
- Kunga Rinchen, Druk Desis (1773–1776)
- Jigme Singye, Druk Desis (1776–1788)
- Druk Tenzin, Druk Desis (1788–1792)
- Umzey Chapchhab, Druk Desis (1792–1792)
- Sonam Gyaltshen (Tashi Namgyel), Druk Desis (1792–1799)
- Druk Namgyel, Druk Desis (1799–1803)

== Burma ==
- Hsipaw (complete list) –

- Hso Wai Hpa, Saopha (1675–1702)
- Sao Okka Wara, Saopha (1702–1714)
- Sao Okka Seya, Saopha (1714–1718)
- Sao Sam Myo, Saopha (1718–1722)
- Sao Hkun Neng, Saopha (1722–1752)
- Sao Sawra Tawta, Saopha (1752–1767)
- Sao Myat San Te, Saopha (1767–1788)
- Sao Hswe Kya, Saopha (1788–1809)

- Kengtung (complete list) –

- Sao Möng Lek, Saopha (?–1730)
- Sao Maung Hkawn, Saopha (1730–c.1735, 1739–1742)
- Sao Möng Hsam, Saopha (1742–1786)
- Sao Kawng Tai I, Saopha (1787–1802, 1814–1815)

== India ==
- Ajaigarh (complete list) –

- Guman Singh, Raja (1765–1792)
- Bakht Singh, Raja (1792–1793)
- Ali Bahadur, usurper Raja (1793–1802)

- Akkalkot (complete list) –

- Fatehsinh I Raje Bhosle, Chief (1707–1760)
- Shahaji I, Chief (1760–1789)
- Fatehsinh II, Chief (1789–1822)

- Alirajpur (complete list) –

- Udai Deo, Rana (?)
- Pahad Deo II, Rana (?–1765)
- Pratap Singh I, Rana (1765–1818)

- Alwar (complete list) –

- Partap Singh, Raja (1770–1791)
- Bakhtawar Singh Prabhakar, Raja (1791–1815)

- Arakkal kingdom (complete list) –

- Ali II, Raja (1691–1704)
- Kunhi Amsa I, Raja (1704–1720)
- Muhammad Ali IV, Raja (1720–1728)
- Bibi Harrabichi Kadavube, Raja (1728–1732)
- Bibi Junumabe I, Raja (1732–1745)
- Kunhi Amsa II, Raja (1745–1777)
- Bibi Junumabe II, Raja (1777–1819)

- Balasinor (complete list) –

- Sardar Muhammed khan Babi 28 September, Nawab Babi (1758–?)
- Jamiyat Khanji Muhammad Khanji, Nawab Babi (18th century–?)

- Banganapalle (complete list) –

- Muhammad Beg Khan-i-lung, Kiladar (1686–1725)
- Ata Khan, Kiladar (1725–1728)
- Fazil `Ali Khan I, Kiladar (1728–1737)
- Fazil `Ali Kahn II, Kiladar (1737–1769)
- Saiyid Husain Ali Khan, Kiladar (1769–1783)
- Muhammad Yusuf -Mysore Administrator, Kiladar (1784–1790)
- Mozaffar al-Molk Asad `Ali Khan, Kiladar (1790–1814)
- Gholam `Ali Khan I, Kiladar (1790–1822)

- Bansda (complete list) –

- Virsimhji I, Raja Sahib (1701–1716)
- Ralbhamji, Raja Sahib (1716–1739)
- Ghulabsimhji I, Raja Sahib (1739–1753)
- Udaisimhji III, Raja Sahib (1753–1770)
- Kiratsimhji Las, Raja Sahib (1770–1780)
- Virsimhji II, Raja Sahib (1780–1789)
- Naharsimhji, Raja Sahib (1789–1793)
- Raisimhji, Raja Sahib (1793–1815)

- Banswara (complete list) –

- Ajab Singh, Rai Rayan (1688–1706)
- Bhim Singh, Rai Rayan (1706–1713)
- Bishan Singh, Rai Rayan (1713–1737)
- Udai Singh II, Rai Rayan (1737–1747)
- Prithvi Singh, Rai Rayan (1747–1786)
- Bijai Singh, Rai Rayan (1786–1816)

- Baoni (complete list) –

- Ghazi ud-Din Khan Feroze Jung III, Nawab (1784–1800)
- Naser ad-Dowla, Nawab (1800–1815)

- Baraundha (complete list) –

- Mohan Singh, Thakur (1790–1827)

- Baria (complete list) –

- Mansimhji I Vijaysimhji, Raja (?–c.1720)
- Prithvirajji I Mansimhji, Raja (18th century)
- Rayadharji Prithviraji, Raja (18th century)
- Gangdasji I Rayadharji, Raja (18th century)
- Gambhirsimhji Gangdasji, Raja (18th century)
- Dhiratsimhji Gambhirsimhji, Raja (18th–19th century)

- Baroda: Gaekwad dynasty (complete list) –

- Pilaji Rao Gaekwad, Maharaja (1721–1732)
- Damaji Rao Gaekwad, Maharaja (1732–1768)
- Govind Rao Gaekwad, Maharaja (1768–1771, 1793–1800)
- Sayaji Rao Gaekwad I, Maharaja (1771–1789)
- Manaji Rao Gaekwad, Maharaja (1789–1793)
- Anand Rao Gaekwad, Maharaja (1800–1818)

- Barwani (complete list) –

- Parbat Singh, Rana (1700–1708)
- Mohan Singh I, Rana (1708–1730)
- Anup Singh, Rana (1730–1760)
- Umed Singh, Rana (1760–1794)
- Mohan Singh II, Rana (1794–1839)

- Benares (complete list) –

- Mansa Ram, Zamindar (1737–1740)
- Balwant Singh, Raja (1740–1770)
- Chait Singh, Raja (1770–1781)
- Mahipat Narayan Singh, Raja (1781–1795)
- Udit Narayan Singh, Raja (1795–1835)

- Bharatpur (complete list) –

- Badan Singh, Maharaja (1722–1756)
- Suraj Mal, Maharaja (1756–1763)
- Jawahar Singh, Maharaja (1763–1768)
- Ratan Singh, Maharaja (1768–1769)
- Keshri Singh, Maharaja (1769–1771)
- Nahar Singh, Maharaja (1771–1776)
- Ranjit Singh, Maharaja (1776–1805)

- Bhavnagar (complete list) –

- Ratanji, Thakur Sahib (1660–1703)
- Bhavsinhji I Ratanji, Thakur Sahib (1703–1764)
- Akherajji II Bhavsinhji, Thakur Sahib (1764–1772)
- Wakhatsinhji Akherajji, Thakur Sahib (1772–1816)

- Bhopal (complete list) –

- Dost Mohammad Khan, Nawab (1707–1728)
- Sultan Muhammad Khan, Nawab (1728–1742)
- Yar Mohammad Khan, Regent (1728–1742)
- Faiz Mohammad Khan, Nawab (1742–1777)
- Hayat Mohammad Khan, Nawab (1777–1807)

- Bhor (complete list) –

- Shankaraji Narayan Sacheev, Pant Sachiv (1697–1707)
- Naro Shankaraji, Pant Sachiv (1707–1737)
- Chimnaji I, Pant Sachiv (1737–1757)
- Sadasiv Rao, Pant Sachiv (1757–1787)
- Raghunath Rao, Pant Sachiv (1787–1791)
- Shankr Rao I, Pant Sachiv (1797–1798)
- Pantsachiv Chimnaji Rao II, Pant Sachiv (1798–1827)

- Bijawar (complete list) –

- Bir Singh Deo, Raja (1765–1793)
- Himmat Bahadur, usurper Raja (1793–1802)

- Bikaner

- Maharajas (complete list) –

- Sujan Singh, Maharaja (1700–1735)
- Zorawar Singh, Maharaja (1735–1746)
- Gaj Singh, Maharaja (1746–1787)
- Raj Singh II, Maharaja (1787–1787)
- Pratap Singh, Maharaja (1787–1787)
- Surat Singh, Regent (?–1787), Maharaja (1787–1828)

- Dewans (complete list) –

- Anand Ram Khawas, Dewan (early 18th century–1733)
- Mohta Bakhtawar Singh, Dewan (1735–1751, 1752–1756, 1757–1762, 1765–1779)
- Amar Singh Chaturbhujani, Dewan (1751–1752)
- Mohta Prithvi Singh, Dewan (1756–1757)
- Shah Mool Chand Bardiya, Dewan (1762–1765)
- Mohta Swaroop Singh, Dewan (1779–1780s)
- Mohta Thakursi, Dewan (1780s–1787)
- Mohta Madho Rai, Dewan (1787–1791)
- Pratap Mal Baid, Dewan (1791–1794)
- Mohta Rao Sahib Singh Gun Roop, Dewan (1794–1805)

- Bilaspur (complete list) –

- Ajmer Chand, Raja (1692–1728)
- Devi Chand, Raja (1738–1778)
- Mahan Chand, Raja (1778–1824)

- Bundi (complete list) –

- Budh Singh, Rao Raja (1696–1730)
- Dalel Singh, Rao Raja (1730–1749)
- Umaid Singh, Rao Raja (1749–1770, 1773–1804)
- Ajit Singh, Rao Raja (1770–1773)

- Cambay (complete list) –

- Mirza Jaffar Mumin Khan I, Nawab (1730–1742)
- Nur-ud-din Muftakher Khan, Nawab (1742–1743)
- Najm ad-Dawla Ja`far Mu´min Khan II, Nawab (1743–1784)
- Mohammad Qoli Khan, Nawab (1784–1790)
- Fath `Ali Khan, Nawab (1790–1823)

- Chamba (complete list) –

- Jit Singh, Raja (1794–1808)
- Charhat Singh, Raja (1808–1844)
- Shri Singh, Raja (1844–1870)
- Gopal Singh, Raja (1870–1873)
- Sham Singh, Raja (1873–1904)

- Charkhari (complete list) –

- Khuman Singh, Raja (1765–1782)
- Bikramajit Singh, Raja (1782–1829)

- Chhatarpur (complete list) –

- Kunwar Sone Shah, Raja (1785–1816)

- Chhota Udaipur (complete list) –

- Arsisinhji, Maharawal (1762–1771)
- Hamirsinhji II, Maharawal (1771–1777)
- Bhimsinhji, Maharawal (1777–1822)

- Kingdom of Cochin (complete list) –

- Rama Varma IV, Maharaja (1697–1701)
- Rama Varma V, Maharaja (1701–1721)
- Ravi Varma III, Maharaja (1721–1731)
- Rama Varma VI, Maharaja (1731–1746)
- Veera Kerala Varma I, Maharaja (1746–1749)
- Rama Varma VII, Maharaja (1749–1760)
- Veera Kerala Varma II, Maharaja (1760–1775)
- Rama Varma VIII, Maharaja (1775–1790)
- Shaktan Thampuran, Maharaja (1790–1805)

- Kingdom of Coorg (complete list) –

- Dodda Virappa, Raja (1687–1736)
- Chikka Virappa, Raja (1736–1766)
- Muddu Raja II, Raja (1766-1770)
- Devappa Raja, Raja (1770-1774)
- Linga Raja, Raja (1774–1780)
- Dodda Vira Rajendra, Raja (1780–1809)

- Danta (complete list) –

- Prithvisimhji Gajsinhji Barad Parmar, Maharana (1687–1743)
- Vikramdeoji Barad Parmar, Maharana (1743)
- Karansinhji Barad Parmar, Maharana (1743–?)
- Ratansinhji Karansinhji Barad parmar, Maharana (18th century)
- Abhaisinhji Barad Parmar, Maharana (?–1795)
- Mansinhji II Abhaisinhji Barad Parmar, Maharana (1795–1800)
- Jagatsinhji Abhaisinhji Barad Parmad, Maharana (1800–1823)

- Datia (complete list) –

- Ramchandra Singh, Rao (1706–1733)
- Indrajit Singh, Rao (1733–1762)
- Shatrujit Singh, Rao (1762–1801)

- Dewas Junior (complete list) –

- Jivaji Rao Puar "Dada Sahib", Raja (1728–1774)
- Sadashiv Rao I Puar, Raja (1774–1790)
- Rukmangad Rao Puar, Raja (1790–1817)

- Dewas Senior (complete list) –

- Tukoji Rao I Puar, Raja (1728–1754)
- Rani Savitribai, Regent (f) (1754–1756)
- Krishnaji Rao I Puar, Raja (1754–1789)
- Rani Gangabai, Regent (f) (1789–1794)
- Tukoji Rao II Puar, Raja (1789–1827)

- Dhar (complete list) –

- Udaji Raje I Pawar, Raja (1728–1732)
- Anand Raje I Pawar, Raja (1732–1736)
- Yeshwant Raje I Pawar, Raja (1736–1761)
- Khande Raje Pawar, Raja (1761–1782)
- Anand Raje II Pawar, Raja (1782–1807)

- Dharampur (complete list) –

- Sahadevji, Rana (1680–1727)
- Ramdevji II, Rana (1727–1758)
- Dharamdevji, Rana (1758–1774)
- Narandevji I (Guman Singh), Rana (1774–1777)
- Maharani Baiji Kushal, Regent (1774–1784)
- Somdevji II (Abhay Singh), Rana (1777–1784)
- Maharani Baiji Kushal Kunverba, Regent (1784–1800)
- Rupdevji, Rana (1784–1807)

- Dholpur (complete list) –

- Gaj Singh, Rana (1699–1713)
- Jaswant Singh, Rana (1713–1717)
- Bhim Singh Rana, Rana (1717–1756)
- Girdhar Pratap Singh, Rana (1756–1757)
- Chhatar Singh, Rana (1757–1803)

- Dhrangadhra (complete list) –

- Gajsinhji II Raisinhji, Raj Sahib (1744/45–1782)
- Raniji Jijibai Kunverba, Raj Sahib (1758–1782)
- Jashwantsinhji II Gajsinhji, Raj Sahib (1782–1801)

- Dhrol (complete list) –

- Kaloji I Panchanji, Thakur Sahib (1644–1706)
- Junhoji I Kaloji, Thakur Sahib (1706–1712)
- Ketoji Junoji, Thakur Sahib (1712–1715)
- Kaloji II Junoji, Thakur Sahib (1715–1716)
- Vaghji Junoji, Thakur Sahib (1716–1760)
- Jaysimhji I Vaghji, Thakur Sahib (1760–1781)
- Junoji II Jaysimhji, Thakur Sahib (1781–1789)
- Nathoji Junoji, Thakur Sahib (1789–?)

- Dungarpur (complete list) –

- Khuman Singh, Maharawal (1691–1702)
- Ram Singh, Maharawal (1702–1730)
- Shiv Singh, Maharawal (1730–1785)
- Vairisal, Maharawal (1785–1790)
- Fateh Singh, Maharawal (1790–1808)

- Dutch India –
- Faridkot (complete list) –

- Hamir Singh, Raja (1763–1782)
- Mohar Singh, Raja (1783–1798)
- Charat Singh, Raja (1798–1804)

- Garhwal Kingdom (complete list) –

- Fateh Shah, King (1660–1708)
- Upendra Shah, King (1708–1709)
- Pradip Shah, King (1709–1772)
- Lalit Shah, King (1772–1780)
- Jayakrit Shah, King (1780–1786)
- Pradyumna Shah, King (1786–1804)

- Gondal (complete list) –

- Sagramji I Kumbhoji, Thakur (1648–1713)
- Haloji Sagramji, Thakur (1713–1752)
- Kumbhoji II Haloji, Thakur (1752–1789)
- Muluji Sagramji, Thakur (1789–1791)
- Dajibhai Muluji, Thakur (1791–1800)
- Devaji Sagramji, Thakur (1800–1812)

- Gwalior State: Scindia (complete list) –

- Ranoji Scindia, Maharaja (1731–1745)
- Jayappaji Rao Scindia, Maharaja (1745–1755)
- Jankoji Rao Scindia, Maharaja (1755–1761)
- Kadarji Rao Scindia, Maharaja (1763–1764)
- Manaji Rao Scindia, Maharaja (1764–1768)
- Mahadaji Shinde, Maharaja (1768–1794)
- Daulat Rao Sindhia, Maharaja (1794–1827)

- Hyderabad

- Nizam (complete list) –

- Nizam-ul-Mulk, Nizam (1724–1748)
- Nasir Jung, Nizam (1748–1750)
- Muzaffar Jung, Nizam (1750–1751)
- Salabat Jung, Nizam (1751–1762)
- Ali Khan, Nizam (1762–1803)

- Prime ministers (complete list) –

- Muhammad Iwaz Khan, Prime minister (1724–1730)
- Anwarullah Khan, Prime minister (1730–1742)
- Khuda Banda Khan, Prime minister (1742–1748)
- Shah Nawaz Khan, Prime minister (1748–1750, 1755–1758)
- Raja Ragunath Das, Prime minister (1750–1752)
- Syed Lashkar Khan Rukn ud-Daula, Prime minister (1752–1755)
- Basalat Jung, Prime minister (1758–1761)
- Vithal Sundar, Prime minister (1761–1765)
- Musa Khan Nawab Rukn ud-Daula, Prime minister (1765–1775)
- Viqar-ul-daula, Prime minister (1775–1781)
- Arastu Jah, Prime minister (1781–1795)
- Raja Shan Rai Rayan, Prime minister (1795–1797)
- Arastu Jah, Prime minister (1797–1804)

- Indore: Holkar (complete list) –

- Maharajas (complete list) –

- Malhar Rao Holkar, Maharaja (1731–1766)
- Malerao Khanderao Holkar, Maharaja (1766–1767)
- Ahalya Bai Holkar III, Regent (f) (1767–1795)
- Rajmata Ahilya Devi Holkar, Maharaja (1767–1795)
- Tukojirao Tanaji Holkar, Maharaja (1795–1797)
- Kashirao Tukojirao Holkar, Maharaja (1797–1798)
- Yashwantrao Holkar, Maharaja (1798–1811)

- Jaipur Kingdom (complete list) –

- Jai Singh II, King (1699–1743)
- Ishwari Singh, King (1743–1750)
- Madho Singh I, King (1750–1768)
- Prithvi Singh II, King (1768–1778)
- Pratap Singh of Jaipur, King (1778–1803)

- Jaisalmer (complete list) –

- Amar Singh, Maharawal (1661–1702)
- Jaswant Singh, Maharawal (1702–1708)
- Budh Singh, Maharawal (1708–1722)
- Akhi Singh, Maharawal (1722–1762)
- Mulraj II, Maharawal (1762–1820)

- Janjira (complete list) –

- Kasim Yaqut Khan II, Wazir (1676–1703)
- Amabat Yaqut Khan II, Wazir (1703–1707)
- Surur Yakut Khan II, Wazir (1707–1732)
- Hasan Khan, Wazir (1732–1734)
- Sumbul Khan, Wazir (1734–1737)
- `Abd al-Rahman Khan, Wazir (1737–1740)
- Hasan Khan (2nd time), Wazir (1740–1745)
- Ibrahim Khan I, Wazir (1745–1757, 1757–1761)
- Mohammad Khan I, Wazir (1757)
- Yaqut Khan, Wazir (1761–1772)
- `Abd al-Rahim Khan, Wazir (1772–1784)
- Jauhar Khan, Wazir (1784–1789)
- `Abd al-Karim Yaqut Khan, Wazir (1784–1789)
- Ibrahim Khan II, Wazir (1789–1794)
- Jumrud Khan, Wazir (1794–1803)

- Jawhar (complete list) –

- Patangshah I Vikramshah Mukne, Raja (1678–early 18th century)
- Krishnashah II Patangshah Mukne, Raja (early 18th century–1742)
- Vikramshah II Krishnashah Mukne, Raja (1742–1758)
- Krishnashah III Vikramshah Mukne, Raja (1758–1765)
- Patangshah II Krishnashah Mukne, Raja (1768–1798)
- Vikramshah III Patangshah Mukne, Raja (1798–1821)

- Jhabua (complete list) –

- Kushal Singh, Raja (1677–1723)
- Anup Singh, Raja (1723–1727)
- Sheo Singh, Raja (1727–1758)
- Bahadur Singh, Raja (1758–1770)
- Bhim Singh, Raja (1770–1821)

- Jind (complete list) –

- Sukhachain, Raja (c.1676–1751)
- Alam Singh, Raja (c.1764)
- Bulki Singh, Raja (1700s)
- Gajpat Singh, Raja (1763–1789)
- Bhag Singh, Raja (1789–1819)

- Jodhpur (complete list) –

- Ajit Singh, Maharaja (1679–1724)
- Abhai Singh, Maharaja (1724–1749)
- Ram Singh, Maharaja (1749–1751, 1753–1772)
- Bakht Singh, Maharaja (1751–1752)
- Vijay Singh, Maharaja (1752–1753, 1772–1793)
- Bhim Singh, Maharaja (1793–1803)

- Junagadh (complete list) –

- Muhammad Bahadur Khanji, Nawab (1730–1758)
- Muhammad Mahabat Khanji l, Nawab (1758–1760, 1762–1774)
- Muzaffar Khanji, Nawab (1760–1762)
- Muhammad Hamid Khanji, Nawab (1774–1811)

- Kalahandi (complete list) –

- Jugasai Deo III, Raja (1693–1721)
- Khadag Rai Deo, Raja (1721–1747)
- Raisingh Deo III, Raja (1747–1771)
- Purusottam Deo, Raja (1771–1796)
- Jugasai Deo IV, Raja (1796–1831)

- Kapurthala (complete list) –

- Jassa Singh, Sardar (1777–1783)
- Bagh Singh, Sardar (1783–1801)

- Karauli (complete list) –

- Kanwar Pal II, Maharaja (1691–1734)
- Gopal Singh, Maharaja (1734–1757)
- Tarsam Pal, Maharaja (1757–1772)
- Manak Pal, Maharaja (1772–1804)

- Khilchipur (complete list) –

- Anup Singh II, Dewan (1679–1715)
- Fateh Singh, Dewan (1718–1738)
- Dewan (1738–1770)
- Abhai Singh, Dewan (1770–1787)
- Dip Singh, Dewan (1787–c.1795)
- Durjan Sal, Dewan (1795–1819)

- Kishangarh (complete list) –

- Man Singh, Maharaja (1658–1706)
- Raj Singh, Maharaja (1706–1748)
- Bahadur Singh, Maharaja (1748–1781)
- Samant Singh, Maharaja (1748–1765)
- Sardar Singh, Maharaja (1765–1768)
- Birad Singh, Maharaja (1781–1788)
- Pratap Singh, Maharaja (1788–1798)
- Kalyan Singh, Maharaja (1798–1839)

- Kolhapur (complete list) –

- Shivaji II, Raja (1710–1714)
- Sambhaji II, Raja (1714–1760)
- Jiji Bai, Regent (f) (1760–1773)
- Shivaji III, Raja (1762–1813)

- Kota (complete list) –

- Ram Singh I, Maharao (1696–1707)
- Bhim Singh I, Maharao (1713–1720)
- Arjun Singh, Maharao (1720–1723)
- Durjan Sal, Maharao (1723–1756)
- Ajit Singh, Maharao (1756–1757)
- Chhatar Sal Singh I, Maharao (1757–1764)
- Guman Singh, Maharao (1764–1771)
- Umaid Singh I, Maharao (1771–1819)

- Kothi (complete list) –

- Lal Jagat Rai Singh Baghel, Rais (1650-1675)
- Lal Angadh Rai Singh Baghel, Rais (1675-1701)
- Lal Barjor Singh Baghel (Virjor), Rais (1701-1721)
- 1721 – 1760 Lal Jagatrop Singh Baghel, Rais (1721-1760)
- Lal Jai Singh Baghel, Rais (1760-1790)
- Lal Duniyapati Singh Baghel, Rais (1790-1829)

- Kumaon Kingdom: Chand (complete list) –

- Gyan Chand, King (1698–1708)
- Jagat Chand, King (1708–1720)
- Devi Chand, King (1720–1726)
- Ajit Chand, King (1726–1729)
- Kalyan Chand V, King (1729–1747)
- Dip Chand, King (1747–1777)
- Mohan Chand, King (1777–1779)
- Pradyumna Chand, King (1779–1786)
- Mohan Chand, King (1786–1788)
- Shiv Chand, King (1788)
- Mahendra Chand, King (1788–1790)

- Kingdom of Kutch (complete list) –

- Pragmalji I, King (1698–1715)
- Godji I, King (1715–1719)
- Deshalji I, King (1718–1752)
- Lakhpatji, Regent (1741–1752)
- Lakhpatji, King (1752–1760)
- Godji II, King (1760–1778)
- Rayadhan III, King (1778–1786, 1813)
- Prithvirajji, King (1786–1801)
- Fateh Muhammad, Regent (1786−1813)

- Limbdi (complete list) –

- Verisalji I Aderajj, Thakur Sahib (17th–18th century)
- Askaranji III Verisalji, Thakur Sahib (early 18th century)
- Aderajji II Askaranji, Thakur Sahib (early 18th century)
- Verisalji II Aderajji, Thakur Sahib (mid 18th century)
- Harbhanji I Verisalji, Thakur Sahib (?–1786)
- Harisinhji Harbhanj, Thakur Sahib (1786–1825)

- Lunavada (complete list) –

- Bir Singh, Rana (1674–1711)
- Nar Singh, Rana (1711–1735)
- Wakhat Singh, Rana (1735–1757)
- Dip Singh, Rana (1757–1782)
- Durjan Singh, Rana (1782–1786)
- Jagat Singh, Rana (1786)
- Partab Singh, Rana (1786–1818)

- Madurai Nayak dynasty (complete list) –

- Rani Mangammal, Queen (1689–1704)
- Vijaya Ranga Chokkanatha Nayak, King (1704–1731)
- Meenakshi, Queen (1731–1736)

- Maihar (complete list) –

- Beni Singh, Thakur (1778–1788)
- Rajdhar Singh, Thakur (1788–1790)
- Durjan Singh, Thakur (1790–1825)
- Bishan Singh, Thakur (1826–1850)
- Mohan Prasad, Thakur (1850–1852)
- Raghubir Singh, Thakur (1852–1869)
- Regent (1852–1865)
- Raghubir Singh, Raja (1869–1908)

- Malerkotla (complete list) –

- Sher Muhammad Khan Bahadur, Nawab (1672–1712)
- Ghulam Husain Khan, Nawab (1712–1717)
- Jamal Khan, Nawab (1717–1762)
- Bhikan Khan, Nawab (1762–1763/64)
- Khan Sahib Khan Bahadur Khan, Regent (1764–1766)
- Khan Sahib Umar Khan, Nawab (1766–1780)
- Khan Sahib Asadullah Khan, Nawab (1780–1784)
- Khan Ataullah Khan, Nawab (1784–1809)

- Mandi (complete list) –

- Sidhi Sen, Raja (1684–1727 or 1678–1719)
- Tikka Shiv Jawala Sen, Raja (1703 or 1722)
- Shamsher Sen, Raja (1727–1781)
- Surma Sen, Raja (1781–1788)
- Ishwari Sen, Raja (1788–1826)

- Maratha Empire (complete list) –

- Tarabai, Chhatrapati (1700–1707)
- Shahu I, Chhatrapati (1707–1749)
- Rajaram II, Chhatrapati (1749–1777)
- Shahu II, Chhatrapati (1777–1808)

- Mayurbhanj (complete list) –

- Savesvara Bhanj Deo, Raja (1688–1711)
- Viravikramaditya Bhanj Deo, Raja (1711–1728)
- Raghunath Bhanj Deo, Raja (1728–1750)
- Chakradhar Bhanj Deo, Raja (1750–1761)
- Damodar Bhanj Deo, Raja (1761–1796)
- Rani Sumitra Devi, Regent (1796–1810)

- Morvi (complete list) –

- Kanyoji Rawaji, Thakur Sahib (1698–1733)
- Aliyaji Kanyoji, Thakur Sahib (1733–1739)
- Rawaji Aliyaji I, Thakur Sahib (1739–1764)
- Pachanji Rawaji, Thakur Sahib (1764–1772)
- Waghji I Rawaji, Thakur Sahib (1772–1783)
- Hamirji Waghji, Thakur Sahib (1783–1790)
- Jyaji Waghji, Thakur Sahib (1790–1828)

- Mudhol (complete list) –

- Sardar Akhayaji Raje Ghorpade, Raja (1700–1734)
- Pirajirao Raje Ghorpade, Raja (1734–1737)
- Malojirao III Raje Ghorpade, Raja (1737–1805)

- Mughal Empire (complete list) –

- Muhiuddin Muhammad Aurangzeb Alamgir, Emperor (1658–1707)
- Muhammad Azam Shah, Emperor (1707)
- Bahadur Shah I, Emperor (1707–1712)
- Jahandar Shah, Emperor (1712–1713)
- Farrukh Siyar, Emperor (1713–1719)
- Rafi ud Darajat, Emperor (1719)
- Rafi ud Daulah, Emperor (1719)
- Nikusiyar, Emperor (1719)
- Muhammad Shah, Emperor (1719–1720, 1720–1748)
- Muhammad Ibrahim, Emperor (1720)
- Ahmad Shah Bahadur, Emperor (1748–1754)
- Alamgir II, Emperor (1754–1759)
- Shah Jahan III, Emperor (1760)
- Shah Alam II, Emperor (1759–1806)

- Kingdom/Sultanate of Mysore

- Maharajas (complete list) –

- Chikka Devaraja, Maharaja (1673–1704)
- Kanthirava Narasaraja II, Maharaja (1704–1714)
- Dodda Krishnaraja I, Maharaja (1714–1732)
- Chamaraja Wodeyar VII, Maharaja (1732–1734)
- Krishnaraja Wodeyar II, Maharaja (1734–1761), puppet Maharaja (1761–1766)
- Nanjaraja Wodeyar, puppet Maharaja (1766–1772)
- Chamaraja Wodeyar VIII, puppet Maharaja (1772–1776)
- Chamaraja Wodeyar IX, puppet Maharaja (1776–1796)
- Krishnaraja Wodeyar III, Maharaja (1799–1868)

- Sultans (complete list) –

- Hyder Ali, Sultan (1761–1782)
- Tipu Sultan, Sultan (1782–1799)

- Nagod (complete list) –

- Fakir Shah, Raja (1685–1721)
- Chain Singh, Raja (1720–1748)
- Ahlad Singh, Raja (1748–1780)
- Lal Sheoraj Singh, Raja (1780–1818)

- Nagpur kingdom (complete list) –

- Raghoji I, King (1738–1755)
- Janoji, King (1755–1772)
- Sabaji, King (1772–1775)
- Mudhoji, King (1775–1788)
- Raghoji II, King (1788–1816, 1816–1818)

- Nawanagar (complete list) –

- Lakhaji Tamachi, Jam Saheb (1690–1708)
- Raisinhji Lakhaji, Jam Saheb (1708–1711)
- Tamachi Raisinhji, Jam Saheb (1711–1743)
- Lakhaji Tamachi, Jam Saheb (1743–1767)
- Jasaji Lakhaji, Jam Saheb (1767–1814)

- Nayakas of Chitradurga (complete list) –

- Bharamanna Nayaka, Chief 1689–1721)
- Madakari Nayaka IV, Chief (1721–1748)
- Kasturi Rangappa Nayaka II, Chief (1748–1758)
- Madakari Nayaka, Chief (1758–1779)

- Nayakas of Keladi (complete list) –

- Basavappa Nayaka, Raja (1697–1714)
- Somashekara Nayaka II, Raja (1714–1739)
- Kiriya Basavappa Nayaka, Raja (1739–1754)
- Chenna Basappa Nayaka, Raja (1754–1757)
- Virammaji, Queen (1757–1763)

- Orchha (complete list) –

- Udwat Singh, Raja (1689–1735)
- Prithvi Singh, Raja (1735–1752)
- Sanwant Singh, Raja (1752–1765)
- Hati Singh, Raja (1765–1768)
- Man Singh, Raja (1768–1775)
- Bharti Singh, Raja (1775–1776)
- Vikramajit Mahendra, Raja (1776–1817)

- Oudh (complete list) –

- Saadat Ali Khan I, Nawab (1719–1737)
- Safdarjung, Nawab (1737–1753)
- Shuja-ud-Daula, Nawab (1753–1775)
- Asaf-ud-Daula, Nawab (1775–1797)
- Wazir Ali Khan, Nawab (1797–1798)
- Saadat Ali Khan II, Nawab (1798–1814)

- Palanpur (complete list) –

- Firuz Kamal Khan, Diwan (1688–1704)
- Kamal Khan, Diwan (1704–1708)
- Firuz Khan II, Diwan (1708–1719)
- Karim Dad Khan, Diwan (1719–1732)
- Pahar Khan II, Diwan (1732–1743)
- Bahadur Khan, Diwan (1743–1768)
- Salim Khan I, Diwan (1768–1781)
- Shir Khan, Diwan (1781–1788)
- Mubariz Khan II, Diwan (1788–1793)
- Shamshir Khan, Diwan (1793–1794)
- Firuz Khan III, Diwan (1794–1812)

- Palitana (complete list) –

- Prithvirajji Kandhaji, Thakur Sahib (1697–1734)
- Nonghanji III, Thakur Sahib (1734–?)
- Sartanji II, Thakur Sahib (?–1766)
- Alubhai, Thakur Sahib (1766–1770)
- Undaji, Thakur Sahib (1770–1820)

- Panna (complete list) –

- Chhatrasal, Raja (1675–1731)
- Hardesah Singh, Raja (1731–1739)
- Sabha Singh, Raja (1739–1752)
- Aman Singh, Raja (1752–1758)
- Hindupat Singh, Raja (1758–1777)
- Anirudh Singh, Raja (1777–1779)
- interregnum, Raja (1779–1785)
- Dhokal Singh, Raja (1785–1798)
- Kishor Singh, Raja (1798–1834)

- Patiala (complete list) –

- Ala Singh, Maharaja (1761–1765)
- Amar Singh, Maharaja (1765–1767)
- Amar Singh, Raja (1767–1781)
- Sahib Singh, Raja (1781–1810)

- Patna (complete list) –

- Chhatrasal, Raja (1675–1731)
- Hardesah Singh, Raja (1731–1739)
- Sabha Singh, Raja (1739–1752)
- Aman Singh, Raja (1752–1758)
- Hindupat Singh, Raja (1758–1777)
- Anirudh Singh, Raja (1777–1779)
- Dhokal Singh, Raja (1785–1798)
- Kishor Singh, Raja (1798–1834)

- Porbandar (complete list) –

- Bhanji Sartanji, Rana (1699–1709)
- Khimoji III, Rana (1709–1728)
- Vikmatji III Khimoji, Rana (1728–1757)
- Sartanji II Vikmatji, Rana (1757–1813)

- Portuguese India –
- Pratapgarh (complete list) –

- Sawant Singh, Maharawat (1775–1844)

- Pudukkottai (complete list) –

- Raghunatha Raya Tondaiman, King (1686–1730)
- Vijaya Raghunatha Raya Tondaiman I, King (1730–1769)
- Raya Raghunatha Tondaiman, King (1769–1789)
- Vijaya Raghunatha Tondaiman, King (1789–1807)

- Radhanpur (complete list) –

- Jawan Mard Khan II, Nawab (1753–1765)
- Muhammad Najm ad-Din Khan, Nawab (1765–1787)
- Muhammad Ghazi ad-Din Khan, Nawab (1787–1813)

- Rajgarh (complete list) –

- Mohan Singh, Rawat (1638–1714)
- Amar Singh, Rawat (c.1714–1740)
- Narpat Singh, Rawat (1740–1747)
- Jagat Singh, Rawat (1747–1775)
- Hamir Singh, Rawat (1775–1790)
- Pratap Singh, Rawat (1790–1803)

- Rajkot (complete list) –

- Mehramamji II Bamaniaji, Thakur Sahib (1694–1720)
- Masum Khan Shughaat, Governor (1720–1732)
- Ranmalji I Mehramamji, Thakur Sahib (1732–1746)
- Lakhaji I Ranmalji, Thakur Sahib (1746–?, 1794–1795)
- Mehramamji III Lakhaji, Thakur Sahib (?–1794)
- Ranmalji II Mehramamji, Thakur Sahib (1795–1825)

- Rajpipla (complete list) –

- Chatrasalji, Maharana (17th century–1705)
- Verisalji I, Maharana (1705–1715)
- Jitsinhji, Maharana (1715–1730)
- Gomalsinghji, Maharana (1730–1754)
- Dalilsinhji, usurper Maharana (1754)
- Pratapsinhji, Maharana (1754–1764)
- Raisinhji, Maharana (1764–1786)
- Ajabsinhji, Maharana (1786–1803)
- Naharsinhji, Regent (1793–1803)

- Ramnad estate (complete list) –

- Raghunatha Kilavan Sethupathi]], King (1678–1710)
- Muthu Vairavanatha Sethupathi I]], King (1710–1712)
- Muthu Vijaya Raghunatha Sethupathi]], King (1713–1725)
- Sundaresvara Raghunatha Sethupathi]], King (1725)
- Bavani Sangara Sethupathi, King (1725–1727)
- Kumara Muthu Vijaya Raghunatha Sethupathi, King (1728–1735)
- Sivakumara Muthu Vijaya Raghunatha Sethupathi, King (1735–1747)
- Rakka Thevar Sethupathi, King (1748)
- Sella Muthu Vijaya Raghunatha Sethupathi, King (1749–1762)
- Muthuramalinga Vijaya Ragunatha Sethupathi I, King (1762–1772, 1781–1795)
- Mangaleswari Nachiyar, King (1795–1803)

- Rampur (complete list) –

- Faizullah Khan, Nawab (1748–1793)
- Hafiz Rahmat Khan, Regent (1748–1774)
- Muhammad Ali Khan Bahadur, Nawab (1793–1793)
- Ghulam Muhammad Khan Bahadur, Nawab (1793–1794)
- Ahmad Ali Khan Bahadur, Nawab (1794–1840)

- Ratlam (complete list) –

- Chhatrasal, Raja (1695–1706)
- Keshri Singh, Raja (1706–1716)
- Pratap Singh, Raja (1716–1716)
- Man Singh, Raja (1716–1743)
- Prithvi Singh, Raja (1743–1773)
- Padam Singh, Raja (1773–1800)
- Parbat Singh, Raja (1800–1825)

- Rewa (complete list) –

- Avadhut Singh, Maharaja (1700–1755)
- Ajit Singh, Maharaja (1755–1809)

- Sachin (complete list) –

- Abdul Karim Mohammad Yakut Khan I, Nawab (1791–1802)

- Sailana (complete list) –

- Jai Singh, Raja (1736–1757)
- Jaswant Singh, Raja (1757–1772)
- Ajab Singh, Raja (1772–1782)
- Mokham Singh, Raja (1782–1797)
- Lakshman Singh, Raja (1797–1826)

- Sangli (complete list) –

- Gangadharrao, Regent (1782–1801)
- Chintaman I, Rao (1782–1851)

- Sawantwadi (complete list) –

- Khem Savant II Bhonsle, Raja Sar Desai (1675–1709)
- Phond Savant II Bhonsle, Raja Sar Desai (1709–1738)
- Jayram Sawant Bhonsle, Regent (1738–1753)
- Ramachandra Savant I Bhonsle, Raja Sar Desai (1738–1755)
- Soubhagyavati Janaki Bai Bhonsle, Regent (f) (1755–1763)
- Khem Savant III Bhonsle, Raja Sar Desai (1755–1763)
- Khem Savant III, Raja Bahadur (1763–1803)

- Shahpura (complete list) –

- Bharat Singh, Raja Dhiraj (1706–1729)
- Umaid Singh I, Raja Dhiraj (1729–1769)
- Ram Singh, Raja Dhiraj (1769–1774)
- Bhim Singh, Raja Dhiraj (1774–1796)
- Regent (1796–c.1802)
- Amar Singh, Raja Dhiraj (1796–1827)

- Sirmur (complete list) –

- Mat Prakash, Raja (1684–1704)
- Hari Prakash, Raja (1704–1712)
- Bijay Prakash, Raja (1712–1736)
- Pratap Prakash, Raja (1736–1754)
- Kirat Prakash, Raja (1754–1770)
- Jagat Prakash, Raja (1770–1789)
- Dharam Prakash, Raja (1789–1793)
- Karam Prakash II, Raja (1793–1803)

- Sirohi (complete list) –

- Durjan Singh, Rao (1697–1705)
- Umaid Singh I, Rao (1705–1749)
- Prithvi Singh, Rao (1749–1773)
- Takhat Singh, Rao (1773–1781)
- Regent (1773–1781)
- Jagat Singh, Rao (1773–1782)
- Verisalji II, Rao (1782–1808)

- Sisodia (complete list) –

- Amar Singh II, Rajput (1698–1710)
- Sangram Singh II, Rajput (1710–1734)
- Jagat Singh II, Rajput (1734–1751)
- Pratap Singh II, Rajput (1751–1754)
- Raj Singh II, Rajput (1754–1762)
- Ari Singh II, Rajput (1762–1772)
- Hamir Singh II, Rajput (1772–1778)
- Bhim Singh, Rajput (1778–1828)

- Sitamau (complete list) –

- Kesho Das, Raja (1701–1748)
- Gaj Singh, Raja (1748–1752)
- Fateh Singh, Raja (1752–1802)

- Sonepur (complete list) –

- Raj Singh Deo, Raja (1700–1725)
- Achal Singh Deo, Raja (1725–1750)
- Divya Singh Deo, Raja (1750–1770)
- Jarawar Singh Deo, Raja (1770–1771)
- Sobha Singh Deo, Raja (1771–1786)
- Prithvi Singh Deo, Raja (1786–1841)

- Suket (complete list) –

- Jit Sen, Raja (1663–1721)
- Garur Sen, Raja (1721–1748)
- Bhikam Sen, Raja (1748–1762)
- Ranjit Sen, Raja (1762–1791)
- Bikram Sen II, Raja (1791–1838)

- Thanjavur Maratha kingdom (complete list) –

- Shahuji I, Raja (1684–1712)
- Serfoji I, Raja (1712–1728)
- Tukkoji, Raja (1728–1736)
- Ekoji II, Raja (1736–1737)
- Sujana Bai, Raja (1737–1738)
- Shahuji II, Raja (1738–1739)
- Pratap Singh, Raja (1739–1763)
- Thuljaji, Raja (1763–1787)
- Serfoji II, Raja (1787–1793, 1798–1799)
- Ramaswami Amarasimha Bhonsle, Raja (1793–1798)

- Travancore

- Maharajas (complete list) –

- Marthanda Varma, Maharaja (1729–1758)
- Dharma Raja, Maharaja (1758–1798)
- Balarama Varma, Maharaja (1798–1810)

- Diwans (complete list) –

- Arumukham Pillai, Dalawa (1729–1736)
- Thanu Pillai, Dalawa (1736–1737)
- Ramayyan Dalawa, Dalawa (1737–1756)
- Martanda Pillai, Dalawa (1756–1763)
- Warkala Subbayyan, Dalawa (1763–1768)
- Krishna Gopalayyan, Dalawa (1768–1776)
- Vadiswaran Subbrahmanya Iyer, Dalawa (1776–1780)
- Mullen Chempakaraman Pillai, Dalawa (1780–1782)
- Nagercoil Ramayyan, Dalawa (1782–1788)
- Krishnan Chempakaraman, Dalawa (1788–1789)
- Raja Kesavadas, Dalawa (1789–1798)
- Jayanthan Sankaran Nampoothiri, Dalawa (1798–1799)
- Velu Thampi Dalawa, Dalawa (1799–1809)

- Tripura: Manikya dynasty (complete list) –

- Ratna Manikya II, Maharaja (1685–1693, 1695–1712)
- Mahendra Manikya, Maharaja (1712–1714)
- Dharma Manikya II, Maharaja (1714–1725, 1729)
- Jagat Manikya, Maharaja (1725–1729)
- Mukunda Manikya, Maharaja (1729–1739)
- Joy Manikya II, Maharaja (1739–1744)
- Indra Manikya II, Maharaja (1744–1746)
- Vijaya Manikya III, Maharaja (1746–1748)
- Lakshman Manikya (c.1750s)
- Krishna Manikya, Maharaja (1760–1783)
- Rajdhar Manikya II, Maharaja (1785–1806)

- Udaipur (complete list) –

- Amar Singh II, Maharana (1698–1710)
- Sangram Singh II, Maharana (1710–1734)
- Jagat Singh II, Maharana (1734–1751)
- Pratap Singh II, Maharana (1751–1754)
- Raj Singh II, Maharana (1754–1761)
- Ari Singh II, Maharana (1761–1773)
- Hamir Singh II, Maharana (1773–1778)
- Bhim Singh, Maharana (1778–1828)

- Wadhwan (complete list) –

- Bhagatsinhji Udaisinhji, Thakur Sahib (1681–1707)
- Arjansinhji Madhavsinhji, Thakur Sahib (1707–1739)
- Sabalsinhji Arjansinhji II, Thakur Sahib (1739–1765)
- Chandrasinhji Sabalsinhji, Thakur Sahib (1765–1778)
- Prithirajji Chandrasinhji, Thakur Sahib (1778–1807)

- Wankaner (complete list) –

- Chandrasinhji I Raisinhji, Maharana Raj Shri (1679–1721)
- Prithvirajji Chandrasinhji, Maharana Raj Shri (1721–1728)
- Kesarisinhji I Chandrasinhji, Maharana Raj Shri (1728–1749)
- Bharoji Kesarisinhji, Maharana Raj Shri (1749–1784)
- Kesarisinhji II Raisinhji, Maharana Raj Shri (1784–1787)
- Chandrasinhji II Kesarisinhji, Maharana Raj Shri (1787–1839)

- Yawnghwe (complete list) –

- Hkam Leng, Saopha (1695–1733)
- Htawk Sha Sa, Saopha (1733–1737)
- Hsi Ton Sa, Saopha (1737–1746)
- Hke Hsa Wa, Saopha (1746–1758)
- Naw Mong I, Saopha (1758)
- Yawt Hkam, Saopha (1758–1761)
- Hpong Hpa Ka-sa, Saopha (1761–1762)
- Sao Yun, Saopha (1762–1815)

- Zamorin of Calicut (complete list) –

- Nileswaram Tirunal, Samoothiri (1706–1707)
- Samoothiri from Kilakke Kovilakam (1741–1746)
- Samoothiri from Putiya Kovilakam (1746–1758)
- Samoothiri from Kilakke Kovilakam (1758–1766)
- Samoothiri from Putiya Kovilakam (1766–1788)
- Kerala Varma Vikrama, Samoothiri (1788–1798)
- Krishna Varma, Samoothiri (1798–1806)

== Maldives ==
- Sultanate of the Maldives (complete list) –

Isdhoo dynasty

- Ali V, Sultan (1701)
- Hasan X, Sultan (1701)
- Ibrahim Mudzhiruddine, Sultan (1701–1704)

Dhiyamigili dynasty

- Muhammad Imaduddin II, Sultan (1704–1720)
- Ibrahim Iskandar II, Sultan (1720–1750)
- Muhammad Imaduddin III, Sultan (1750–1757)
- Amina I, Sultana (1753–1754)
- Amina II, Sultana (1757–1759)

Huraa dynasty

- Hasan 'Izz ud-din, Sultan (1759–1766)

Dhiyamigili dynasty

- Muhammed Ghiya'as ud-din, Sultan (1766–1774)

Huraa dynasty

- Muhammad Shamsuddeen II, Sultan (1774)
- Muhammad Mu'iz ud-din, Sultan (1774–1779)
- Hassan Nooraddeen I, Sultan (1779–1799)
- Muhammad Mueenuddeen I, Sultan (1799–1835)

== Nepal ==
- Gorkha Kingdom –

- Prithvipati Shah, King (1673–1716)
- Nara Bhupal Shah, King (1716–1743)
- Prithvi Narayan Shah, King of Gorkha (1743–1768), King of Nepal (1768–1775)

- Kingdom of Nepal

- Kings (complete list) –

- Prithvi Narayan Shah, King of Gorkha (1743–1768), King of Nepal (1768–1775)
- Pratap Singh Shah, King (1775–1777)
- Rana Bahadur Shah, King (1777–1799)
- Girvan Yuddha Bikram Shah, King (1799–1816)

- Mulkajis –

- Abhiman Singh Basnet, Mulkaji (1785–1794)
- Kirtiman Singh Basnyat, Mulkaji (1794–1801)

- Prime ministers (complete list) –

- Damodar Pande, Prime minister (1799–1804)

- Malla rulers of Kantipur (complete list) –

- Bhaskara Malla, Raja (1700–1714)
- Mahendrasimha Malla, Raja (1714–1722)
- Jagajjaya Malla, Raja (1722–1736)
- Jaya Prakash Malla, Raja (1736–1746, 1750–1768)
- Jyoti Prakash Malla, Raja (1746–1750)

- Malla rulers of Lalitpur (complete list) –

- Yoga Narendra Malla, Raja (1685–1705)
- Loka Prakash Malla, Raja (1705–1706)
- Indra Malla, Raja (1706–1709)
- Vira Narasimha Malla, Raja (1709)
- Vira Mahindra Malla, Raja (1709–1715)
- Riddhi Narasimha, Raja (1715–1717)
- Mahindra Simha, King (1717–1722)
- Yoga Prakash Malla, Raja (1722–1729)
- Vishnu Malla, Raja (1729–1745)
- Rajya Prakash Malla, Raja (1745–1758)
- Vishvajit Malla, Raja (1758–1760)
- Jaya Prakash Malla, King (1760–1761, 1763–1764)
- Ranajit Malla, King (1762–1763)
- Dala Mardan Shah, Raja (1764–1765)
- Tej Narasimha Malla, Raja (1765–1768)

== Pakistan ==
- Bahawalpur (complete list) –

- Sadiq I, Nawab (1723–1746)
- Bahawal I, Nawab (1746–1750)
- Mubarak II, Nawab (1750–1772)
- Bahawal II, Nawab (1772–1809)

- Khairpur (complete list) –

- Sohrab Khan Talpur, Mir (1783–1830)

- Khanate of Kalat (complete list) –

- Samandar Khan Ahmadzai, Wali (1697–1714)
- Mir Ahmad II Khan Ahmadzai, Wali (1714–1716)
- Mir Abdullah Khan Ahmadzai, Wali (1716–1731)
- Mir Muhabbat Khan Ahmadzai, Wali (1731–1739), Khan (1739–1749)
- Muhammad Nasir Khan I Ahmadzai, Khan (1749–1794)
- Mahmud Khan I Ahmadzai, Khan (1794–1817)

- Sikh Empire (complete list) –

- Jamadar Khushal Singh, Wazir (1799–1818)

== Sri Lanka ==
- Dutch Ceylon (complete list) –

Colony, 1656–1796
For details see the Dutch Republic under Western Europe

- Kingdom of Kandy (complete list) –

- Vimaladharmasurya II, King (1687–1707)
- Vira Narendra Sinha, King (1707–1739)
- Sri Vijaya Rajasinha, King (1739–1747)
- Kirti Sri Rajasinha, King (1747–1782)
- Rajadhi Rajasinha, King (1782–1798)
- Sri Vikrama Rajasinha, King (1798–1815)

== See also ==
- List of governors of dependent territories in the 19th century
