= List of Malla kings of Nepal =

King of Nepal Mandala

Details
- First monarch: Ari Malla
- Last monarch: Jaya Prakash Malla of Kantipur; Teja Narsimha Malla of Lalitpur; Ranajit Malla of Bhaktapur
- Formed: 1201
- Abolished: 1769
- Residence: Kathmandu Valley

The Malla dynasty was the ruling dynasty of Kathmandu Valley in Nepal, from the 13th to the 18th century. The Mallas, starting from Aridev Malla in 1201, ruled the Kathmandu Valley and surrounding region which was known as Nepal or Nepal Mandala and the citizens were known as Nepa:mi (in Newari) at that time. In the late 15th century, the Kathmandu Valley was divided into four kingdoms of Bhaktapur (Bhadgaon), Kathmandu (Kantipur), Patan (Lalitpur), and Banepa. The division led to weakening of the dynasty resulted by numerous conflicts among the rulers.

The Malla dynasty came to an end in 1769 when Prithvi Narayan Shah of Gorkha invaded the valley, thus inaugurating the Shah dynasty of Nepal.

== Malla rulers of the Kathmandu valley ==
Name	Reign	Notes
Arideva Malla	1201–1216	First Malla king. Lineage still debated.
Abhaya Malla	1216–1255	Suffered from internal and external conflicts. Died in the earthquake of 1255.
Jayadeva Malla	7 June 1255–11 Jan 1258	Deposed. Last successor from the lineage of Arideva.
Jayabhimadeva	Jan 1258–Apr 1271	From House of Bhonta. Became a king after an agreement with Jayasimha Malla.
Jayasimha Malla	Jan 1258–Apr 1271	From House of Tripura. Became a king following the same agreement as before. Deposed.
Ananta Malla	1274–14 Aug 1308	Faced several invasions from the Khasa Kingdom, and Tirhut. Throne was vacant after his death for five years.
Jayanandadeva	1313–1320	Powerless monarch. Administration resided in the hands of Rudra Malla.
Jayari Malla	5 Apr 1320–14 Sep 1344	Devalakshmidevi returns to the valley. Faced Khasa invasion twice.
Jayarajadeva	6 Sep 1348–1361	Nominal figurehead; Devalakashmidevi controls the kingdom; Bengal Sultanate invades Nepal.
Jayarjunadeva	18 Ap 1360–23 Nov 1381	Jayasthiti Malla rises as the supreme figure of the realm. Jayarjuna exiled by the same.
Jayasthiti Malla	15 Sep 1382–5 Sep 1395	Obscure origin; Ancestor to all the later Mallas of Kantipur and Bhaktapur.
Jayadharma Malla	1395–1408	
Jayajyotir Malla	1408–1428	
Jayayakshya Malla	1428–1 March 1482	Valley divided into four kingdoms of Kantipur, Patan, Bhaktapur, and Banepa after his death between his son.

== Malla rulers of Kantipur (Yen) ==
Picture	Name	Reign	
	Ratna Malla	1482–1520	38 years
	Surya Malla	1520–1530	10 years
	Amara (Narendra) Malla	1530–1560	30 years
	Mahendra Malla	1560–1574	14 years
	Sadashiva Malla	1574–1583	9 years
	Shivasimha Malla	1583–1620	37 years
	Lakshmi Narasimha Malla	1620–1641	21 years
	Pratap Malla	1641–1674	33 years
	Nripendra Malla	1674–1680	6 years
	Parthibendra Malla	1680–1687	7 years
	Bhupalendra Malla	1687–1700	13 years
	Bhaskara Malla	1700–1722	22 years
	Jagajjaya Malla	1722–1736	14 years
	Jaya Prakash Malla	1736–1746	10 years
	Jyoti Prakash Malla	1746–1750	4 years
	Jaya Prakash Malla	1750–1768	18 years

== Malla rulers of Lalitpur (Yala) ==
Picture	Name	Reign
	Purandara Simha	c. 1580–1600
	Harihara Simha	c. 1600–1609
	Siddhi Narasimha Malla	1620–1661
	Srinivasa Malla	1661–1685
	Yoga Narendra Malla	1685–1705
	Loka Prakash Malla	1705–1706
	Indra Malla (Purandara Malla)	1706–1709
	Vira Narasimha Malla	1709
	Vira Mahindra Malla	1709–1715
	Riddhi Narasimha Malla	1715–1717
	Mahindrasimha Malla (King of Kantipur)	1717–1722
	Yoga Prakash Malla	1722–1729
	Vishnu Malla	1729–1745
	Rajya Prakash Malla	1745–1758
	Vishvajit Malla	1758–1760
	Jaya Prakash Malla (King of Kantipur)	1760–1761
	Ranajit Malla (King of Bhaktapur)	1762–1763
	Dal Mardan Shah	1764–1765
	Tej Narasimha Malla	1765–1768

== Malla rulers of Bhaktapur (Khwopa) ==
Picture	Name	Reign
	Raya Malla	1482–1505
	Bhuwana Malla	1405–1519
	Prana Malla	1519–1547
	Vishva Malla	1547–1561
	Trailokya Malla (with Tribhuvana Malla and Ganga Rani)	1560–1613
	Jagajjyoti Malla	1613–1637
	Naresha Malla	1637–1643
	Jagat Prakasha Malla	1643–1672
	Jitamitra Malla	1672–1696
	Bhupatindra Malla	1696–1722
	Ranajit Malla	1722–1769
