= Kartik Naach =

Dance musical

Kartik Nach
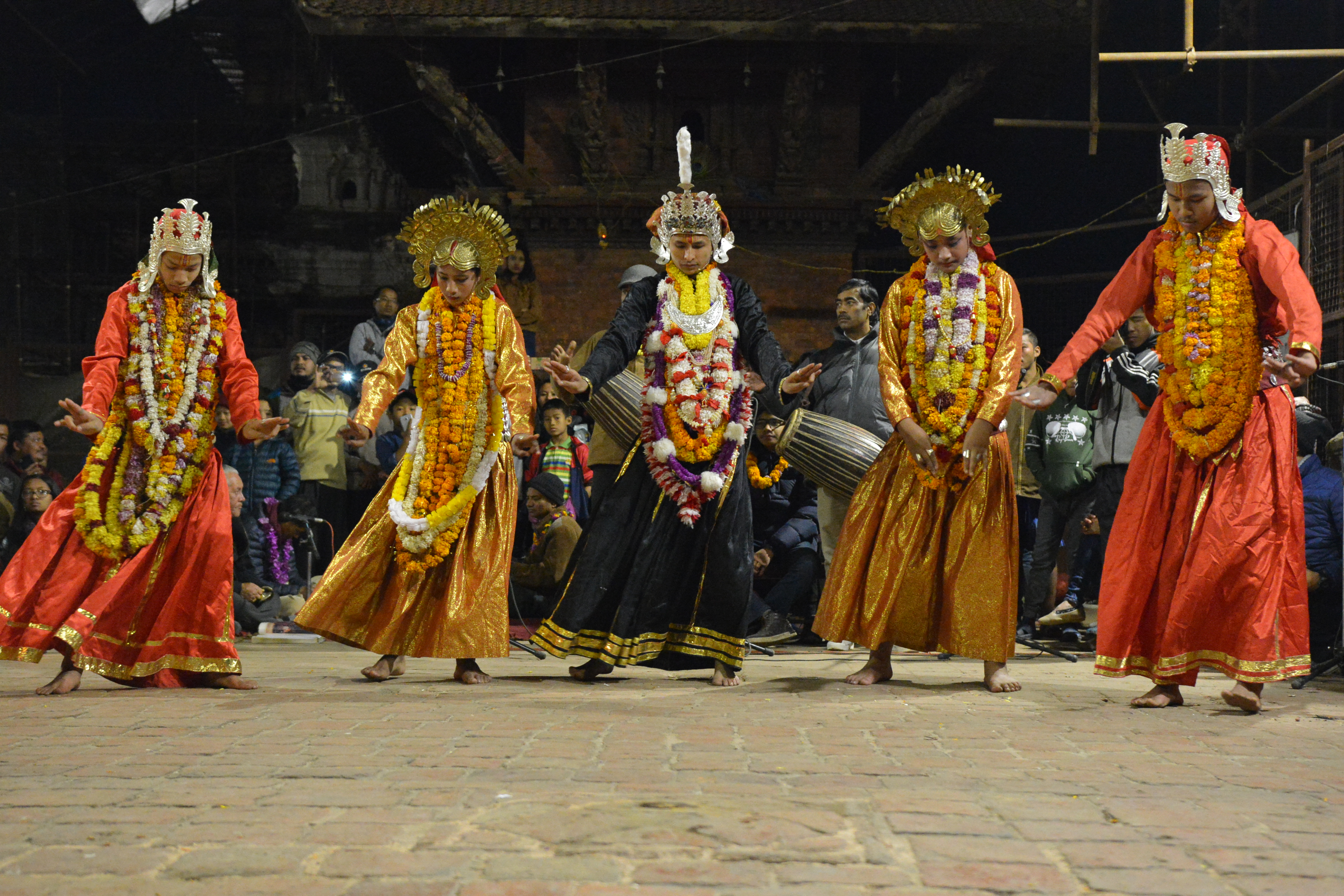
- Actors performing Kartik naach
- Native name: Kārtik Pyākhan
- Genre: Religious
- Year: 1641 CE
- Origin: Kingdom of Lalitpur

Kartik Naach (Newar: कात्तिक प्याखं) is a Newar language musical theatre performed in the month of Kartik (October or November) in Nepal. It was started in 1641 AD by King Siddhi Narsingh Malla. The play is performed in Kartik Dabali, Patan Durbar Square every year.

It is usually presented for two to 27 days with 17 tales of Hindu god Vishnu. Originally it was shown for two days, but Narsingh Malla's son Srinivas Malla added seven days, and Narsingh Malla's grandson Yog Narendra Malla added 15.

== Background ==
One of the dances performed in the play, 2018

The play was preserved by Kartik Naach Prabandhan Samiti, but the Kartik Nach Preservation Committee (KNPC) has been preserving it since 2013. The play usually starts with dancers in colourful clothes portraying Hindu deities including Barahi, Ganesh, Shiva, and Krishna. The dancers also wear festoons around their necks. It is performed by Newar people and in 2015, there were "45 musicians and 10 helpers" performing.

It is also performed near the golden window in Patan and the window is opened only for the play. Legends say that it was built to honour the King Siddhi Narsingh Malla. Most of the dances and music are thought to have been composed by Narsingh Malla, but there have been minor changes to it. Hari Man Shrestha, previously a director of KNPC, has penned a book on the play.

The April 2015 Nepal earthquake critically damaged Patan Durbar Square. Seven months later, Kartik Naach was performed for 10 nights, while it was still damaged. Xinhua News Agency wrote, "Despite the tragedy, thousands of Nepali people, young and old, trooped to the temple to watch the open-air presentation of the historical dance-drama to the accompaniment of folk music". In 2018, Lalitpur had distributed 200,000 Nepalese rupees to the play.

== Gallery ==
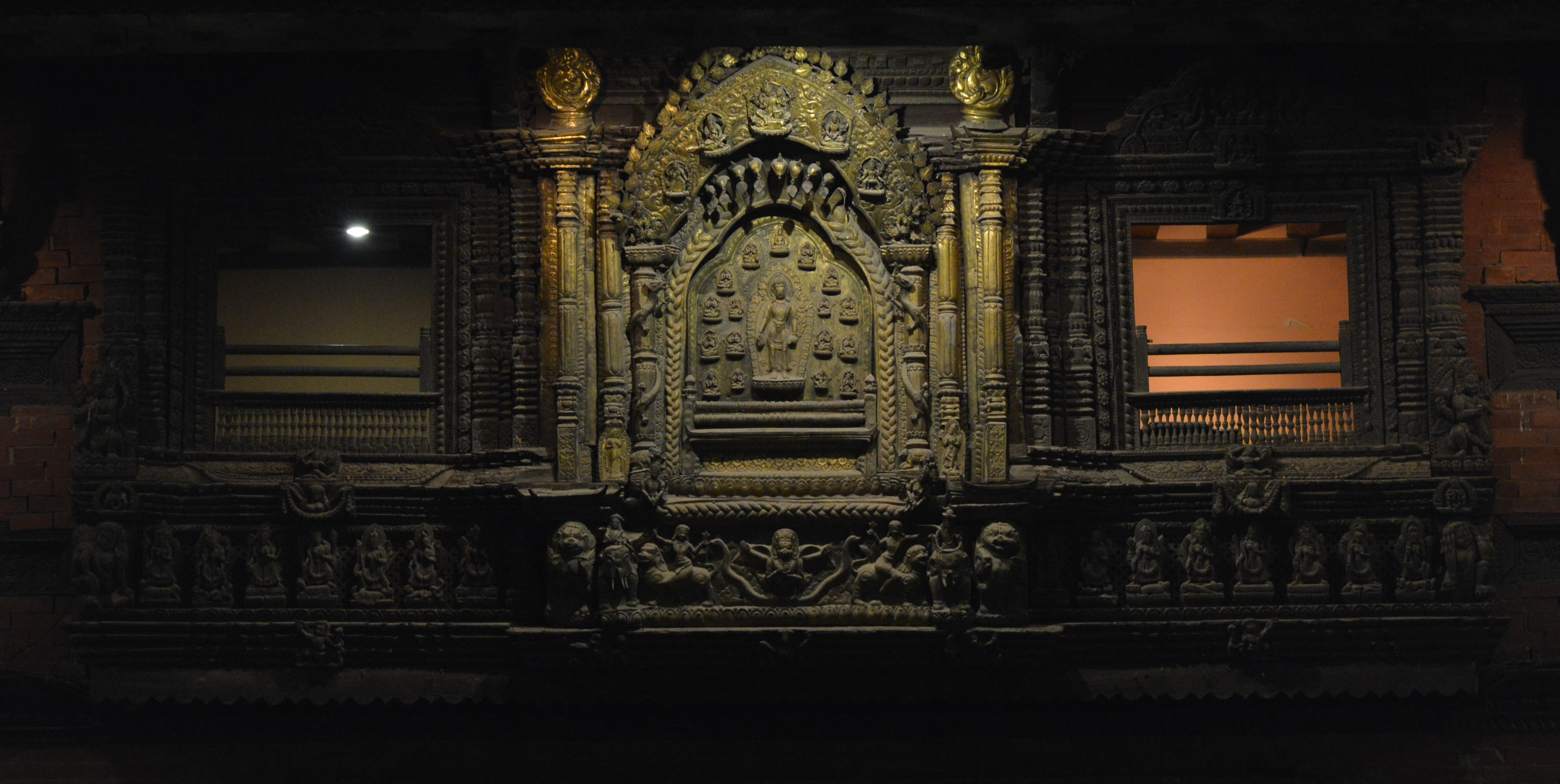
The golden window that is opened once a year.

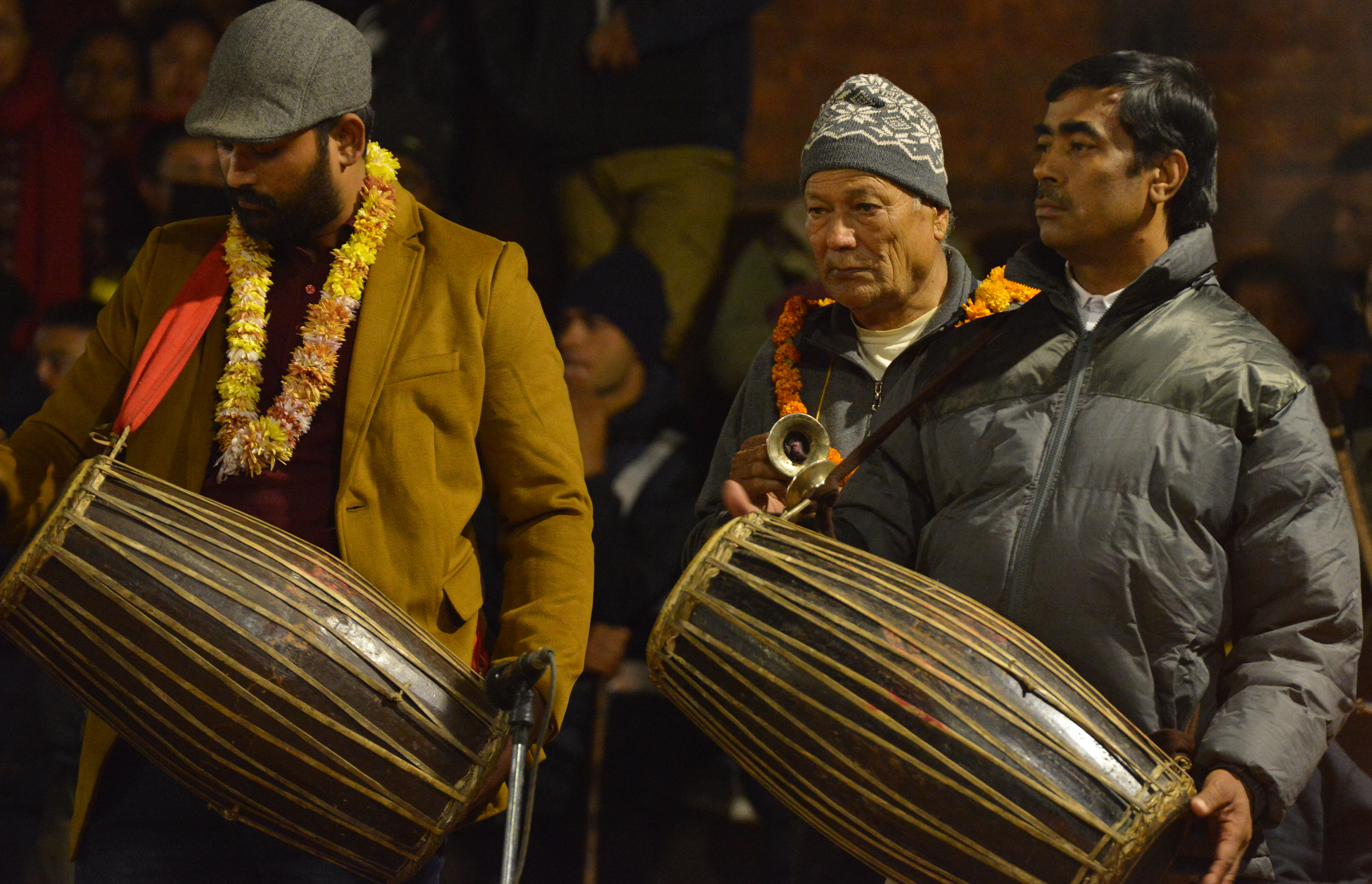
Newar musicians performing
