= Riddhi Narasimha Malla =

18th-century King of Patan

King of Patan
- Reign: 1715–1717
- Predecessor: Vira Mahindra Malla
- Successor: Mahindrasimha Malla
- Born: Nepal
- Died: 1717
- Dynasty: Malla
- Father: Rudrendra Malla

Riddhi Narasimha Malla (Newar: 𑐆𑐡𑑂𑐢𑐶𑐣𑐬𑐳𑐶𑑄𑐴 𑐩𑐮𑑂𑐮), also spelled Hridinarasimha (𑐴𑐺𑐡𑐶𑐣𑐬𑐳𑐶𑑄𑐴), was a Malla dynasty king and the King of Patan. He succeeded Vira Mahindra Malla and reigned from 1715 until his death in 1717.

== Life ==
Riddhi Narasimha was the son of Rudrendra Malla and the grandson of Rudramati, the sister of Yoga Narendra Malla. He was a religious king and donated various items to religious places.

=== Succession ===
After the death of Riddhi Narasimha in 1717, there were no any legitimate heirs. The Kajis of Patan wanted Ranajit Malla, the then heir apparent of Bhadgaon, to take over as the King of Patan. Due to the influence of Yogamati, Bhaskara Malla of Kantipur was proclaimed as the king. Bhaskara Malla reigned as Mahindrasimha Malla in Patan.

Preceded by Vira Mahindra Malla	King of Patan; 1715–1717	Succeeded by Mahindrasimha Malla
