= Kumudini Devi =

Nepalese Queen and Poet

Kumudini
- śrī śrī kumudini devī
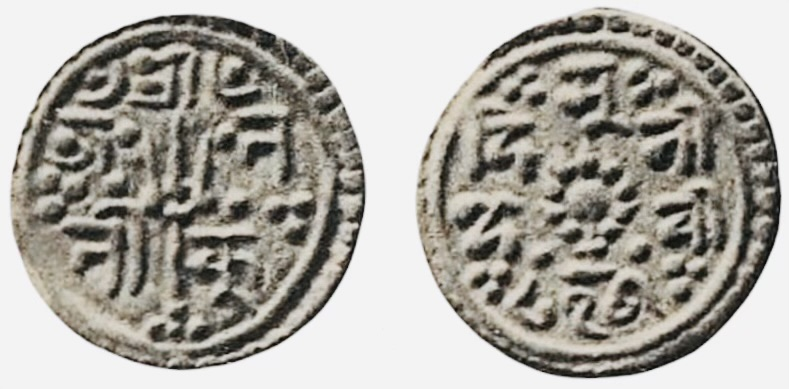
- Coin issued in the name of Kumudini Devi by Jayaprakash Malla, inscribed in the Newar script, 1756 CE.

Queen Consort of Kantipur
- Tenure: 1722–1736
- Successor: Dayā Lakshmi
- Died: c. 1770; Patna, Bengal Presidency, East India Company (Present day Uttar Pradesh, India)
- Spouse: Jagajjaya Malla
- Issue: Jaya Prakash Malla; Rajya Prakash Malla; Narendra Prakash Malla; Chandra Prakash Malla
- Dynasty: Malla (by marriage)

Kumudini Devi (Nepal Bhasa: 𑐎𑐸𑐩𑐸𑐡𑐶𑐣𑐷 𑐡𑐾𑐧𑐷) was the queen consort of the Nepalese Kingdom of Kantipur from 1722 to 1736 as the first wife of Jagajjaya Malla and later served as regent for a short while for her son Jaya Prakash Malla. She was also a poet writing in the Newar language.

Her husband Jagajjaya Malla issued suki coins which were one-fourth of the mohar, with her name in them. Kumudini was also held in high regard by her son, Jaya Prakash Malla as well. Her son also issued coins in her name, giving her the title of sri janani ("venerable mother") in the coinage. Similarly, he has dedicated several poems in his Classical Newar play vira dvajopakhyana nataka to her, where he has written about his devotion to her. When Jaya Prakasa was exiled from Kathmandu in 1746, Kumudni provided him with financial support until his restoration in 30 April 1750.

Kumudini was alive till the conquest of Nepal by the Gorkhali forces in 1769. According to the Capuchin Father Gisueppe, the following was her fate, "A short time afterwards the mother of Gainprejas [sic] also procured the same indulgence, having from old age already lost her eye sight: but before her departure they took from her a necklace of jewels (as she herself told me) when she arrived at Patna with the widow of her grandson: and I could not refrain from tears, when I beheld the misery and disgrace of this blind and unhappy queen".
