= Vishvajit Malla =

18th-century King of Patan

Visvajit Malla

King of Patan
- Reign: 1758–1760
- Predecessor: Rajya Prakash Malla
- Successor: Jaya Prakash Malla
- Born: Nepal
- Died: 1760
- Spouse: Chandralakshmi
- Dynasty: Malla

Vishvajit Malla (Newar: 𑐰𑐶𑐱𑑂𑐰𑐖𑐶𑐟 𑐩𑐮𑑂𑐮) was a Malla dynasty king and the King of Patan. He succeeded Rajya Prakash Malla and reigned from 1758 until his murder in 1760.

== Life ==
According to a chronicle, he was a son of Vishnu Malla's daughter. He was killed by the nobles at the gate of Taleju temple in 1760 on the accuse of adultery. The nobles then installed Jayaprakash Malla of Kantipur to rule Patan.

Preceded by Rajya Prakash Malla	King of Patan; 1758–1760	Succeeded by Jaya Prakash Malla
