= Vira Mahindra Malla =

18th-century King of Patan

King of Patan
- Reign: 1709–1715
- Predecessor: Vira Narasimha Malla
- Successor: Riddhi Narasimha Malla
- Born: Nepal
- Died: 1715
- Dynasty: Malla

Vira Mahindra Malla (Newar: 𑐰𑐷𑐬 𑐩𑐴𑐷𑐣𑑂𑐡𑑂𑐬 𑐩𑐮𑑂𑐮), also known as Mahendra Malla, was a Malla dynasty king and the King of Patan. He succeeded Vira Narasimha Malla and reigned from 1709 to 1715.

== Life ==
Vira Mahindra Malla was an illegitimate son of Yoganarendra Malla. His mother, Rajeswaridevi, was driven out to Tanahun by the faction led by Indra Malla (a nephew of Yoganarendra through his sister Manimati and thus a grandson of Srinivasa Malla) before his birth and thus he was born in Tanahun. He spent his early childhood there and returned with his mother to Patan.

In 1709, after the death of Indra Malla, there was a political struggle for power between Rajeswaridevi and Yogamati, the daughter of Yoganarendra Malla. Vira Narasimha Malla was installed as the ruler by Yogamati at first but he was quickly succeeded by Vira Mahindra in the same year. Gorkha Kingdom, then ruled by Prithvipati Shah, also supported the installation of Vira Mahindra Malla as the king of Patan.

He died of smallpox in 1715 and was succeeded by Riddhi Narasimha Malla, a descendant of Srinivasa Malla.

Preceded by Vira Narasimha Malla	King of Patan; 1709–1715	Succeeded by Riddhi Narasimha Malla
