= Vishnu Malla =

18th-century King of Patan

King of Patan
- Reign: 1729–1745
- Predecessor: Yoga Prakash Malla
- Successor: Rajya Prakash Malla
- Born: Nepal
- Died: 1745
- Spouse: Chandralakshmi
- Dynasty: Malla
- Father: Darasimha
- Mother: Punyamati

Vishnu Malla (Newar: 𑐰𑐶𑐲𑑂𑐞𑐸 𑐩𑐮𑑂𑐮) was a Malla dynasty king and the King of Patan. He succeeded Yoga Prakash Malla and reigned from 1729 until his death in 1745.

== Ancestry ==
Vishnu Malla traced his lineage from Srinivasa Malla. Srinivasa Malla had a daughter named Manimati. Manimati's children were Indra Malla, and Punyamati. Punyamati married Darasimha and they were the parents of Vishnu Malla.

== Reign ==
He strengthened his political powers by marrying Chandralakshmi, daughter of Jagajjaya Malla, the King of Kantipur. Kantipur and Patan once jointly invaded Bhadgaon and occupied areas around Sanga which was later retaken with the help of Tanahun. It was during the time of Vishnu Malla that the Gorkha Kingdom and Tanahun started intervening in the politics of Kathmandu Valley and would end after being annexed by Prithvi Narayan Shah, the Gorkha king.

Vishnu Malla built and renovated several religious monuments. He frequently donated generous grants to temples and guthis.

== Succession ==
Vishnu Malla did not have any children and adopted his brother-in-law, Rajya Prakash Malla, as successor. Rajya Prakash was the third son of Jagajjaya Malla, the King of Kantipur, and had previously been expelled from his family's kingdom by his brother Jaya Prakash Malla, who succeeded their father as the king of Kantipur. Rajya Prakash succeeded Vishnu Malla to the throne of Patan after Vishnu's death in 1745.

== Literary works ==
Vishnu Malla is known to have composed a drama named Uṣā haraṇa in the Newar language. Similarly, he is also known to write many devotional songs and hymn in Newar language which are still sang by dapha singing groups in Patan.

| Preceded by Yoga Prakash Malla | King of Patan; 1729–1745 | Succeeded by Rajya Prakash Malla |
