= Girdhar Pratap Singh =

Maharaj Rana of Gohad
- Reign: 1756-1757
- Predecessor: Bhim Singh
- Successor: Maharaja Chhatar Singh Rana
- House: Bamraulia Dynasty
- Religion: Hindu

Girdhar Pratap Singh Rana was the ruler of Gohad state in Madhya Pradesh, India. He became the ruler of Gohad after the fall of Bhim Singh Rana, who had no son. Girdhar Pratap Singh became his successor in 1755. Girdhar Pratap Singh was the son of Samant Rao Balju, a family friend of Rana Bhim Singh. Girdhar Pratap Singh could not rule Gohad for long as he died in 1757. His successor was Rana Chhatar Singh (1757–1785). He was from Bamraulia caate. He ruled Gohad state until 1757.

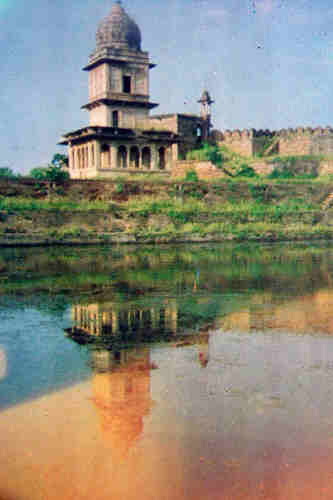
Chhatri near Bhimtal in memory of Rana of Gohad (Gwalior) on the Gwalior Fort.

Girdhar Pratap Singh Bamraulia Dynasty Died: 1757
Regnal titles
Preceded by Bhim Singh	Maharaj Rana of Gohad; 1756-1757	Succeeded by Chhatar Singh
