= Six Pradhans =

The Six Pradhans were a council of six high-ranking officials or courtiers who exercised significant political influence in the governance of Lalitpur (Patan) during the later Malla period in what is now Nepal. In periods of political instability, especially after the death of certain Malla kings, these Pradhans often held substantial de facto power, sometimes overshadowing the monarchs themselves.

== Role in Lalitpur ==
In the 18th century, following the death of King Yognarendra Malla and during periods of internal disorder in Patan, the Six Pradhans were the dominant political force in the city-state. They were instrumental in placing and removing monarchs on the throne and managing state affairs when royal leadership was weak or contested.

The Pradhans sometimes acted as power brokers, using their wealth and influence to stabilize or control the kingdom. Historical accounts suggest that at times the actual power in Lalitpur resided more with the Pradhans than with the ceremonial kings they appointed.

== Interaction with the Gorkha Conquest ==
During the period when Prithvi Narayan Shah and the Gorkha Kingdom were expanding their rule over the Kathmandu Valley, the authority of the Six Pradhans in Patan came under pressure. After prolonged political turmoil and the weakening of central royal authority, Lalitpur eventually fell to the Gorkhalis as part of the Unification of Nepal.

== Legacy ==
The Six Pradhans are remembered in Nepalese history as powerful noble officials who played a central role in the political life of Lalitpur during the decline of Malla power. They illustrate a period in which court nobles could exert strong influence over royal succession and administration.

== Names ==
Historical summaries of the Six Pradhans list their names as:

- Dhanwanta Singh (Pradhan)
- Bhinkhyal Singh (Pradhan)
- Sinkhyal Singh (Pradhan)
- Chaku Bahal Singh (Pradhan)
- Kalidas Singh (Pradhan)
- Dhanjkaji Singh (Pradhan)
