= Yoga Prakash Malla =

18th-century King of Patan

King of Patan
- Reign: 1722–1729
- Predecessor: Mahindrasimha Malla
- Successor: Vishnu Malla
- Born: Nepal
- Died: 1729
- Dynasty: Malla

Yoga Prakash Malla (Newar: 𑐫𑑀𑐐𑐥𑑂𑐬𑐎𑐵𑐱 𑐩𑐮𑑂𑐮), also spelled Yogprakash, was a Malla dynasty king and the King of Patan. He succeeded Mahindrasimha Malla and reigned from 1722 until his death in 1729.

== Life ==
His ancestry is still a topic of debates among scholars. Many agree that he was a prince of Bhadgaon and was exiled because he was born under the wrong astrological sign. It could also be that Yogamati had installed Yoga Prakash as the king as she was still influential at that time. He was also a religious monarch like his predecessors and donated several items to temples and guthis.

He died in 1729 and was succeeded by Vishnu Malla, a descendant of Srinivasa Malla.

| Preceded by Mahindrasimha Malla | King of Patan; 1722–1729 | Succeeded by Vishnu Malla |
