= Vira Narasimha Malla =

18th-century King of Patan

King of Patan
- Reign: 1709
- Predecessor: Indra Malla
- Successor: Vira Mahindra Malla
- Born: Nepal
- Died: 1709
- Dynasty: Malla

Vira Narasimha Malla (Newar: 𑐰𑐷𑐬 𑐣𑐬𑐳𑐶𑑄𑐴 𑐩𑐮𑑂𑐮) was a Malla dynasty king and the King of Patan. He succeeded Indra Malla and reigned in 1709.

== Life ==
The origin of Vira Narasimha Malla is still debated among scholars and some propose that he was a descendant of Siddhi Narasimha Malla, while others debate that Yogamati had remarried Vira Narasimha and made him a Malla king.

After the death of Indra Malla, there was a political struggle for power between Yogamati, the daughter of Yogaprakash Malla, and Rajeswaridevi, a concubine of the same. The faction of Yogamati installed Vira Narasimha as the king in 1709 but that lasted for only a brief months. He was replaced by Vira Mahindra Malla in the same year. His name again appears on the documents from 1715 but without any royal titles.

Preceded by Indra Malla	King of Patan; 1709	Succeeded by Vira Mahindra Malla
