= Rajya Prakash Malla =

18th-century King of Patan

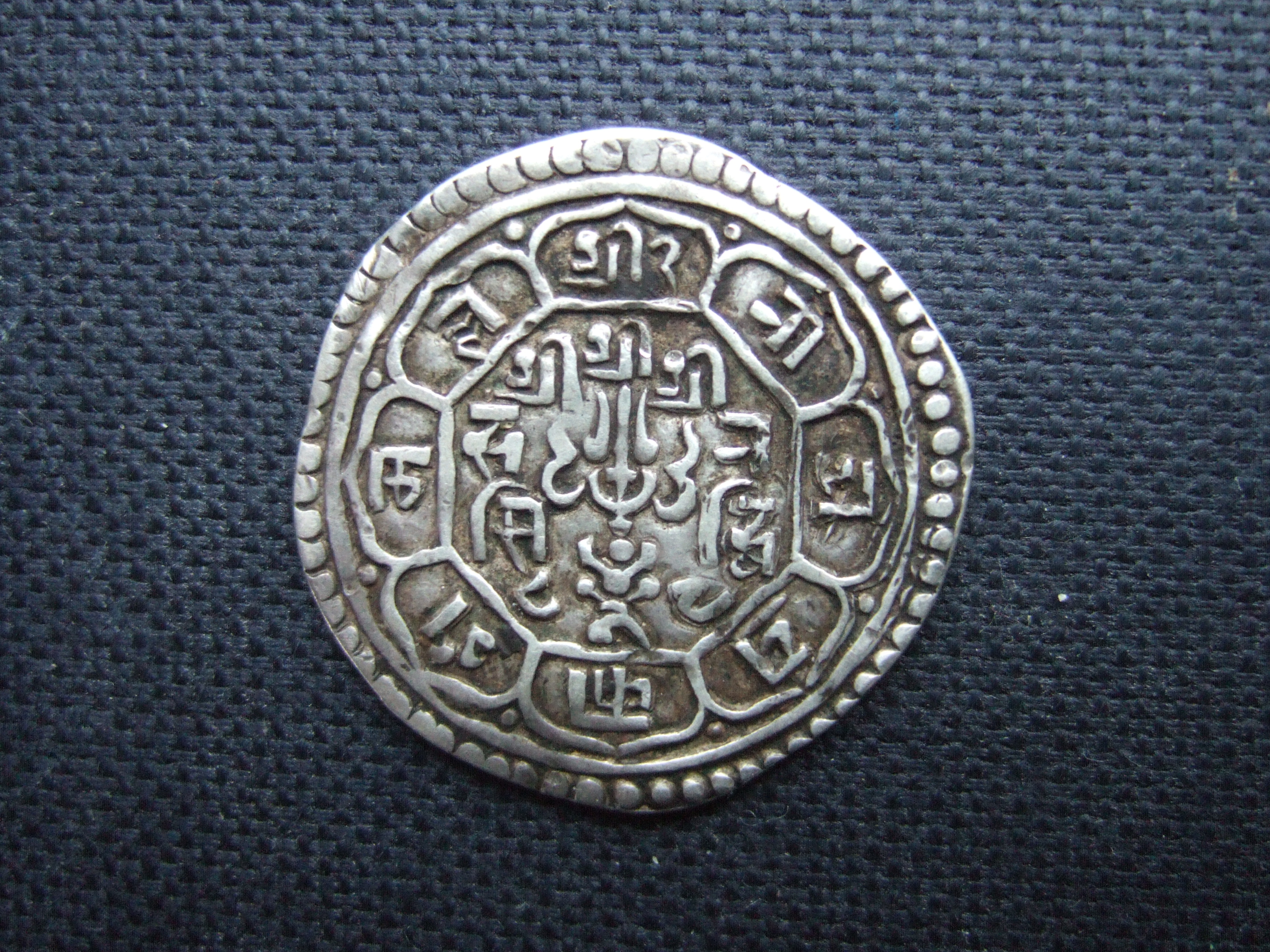
- Silver coin of Rajya Prakash Malla, inscribed in the Newar script.

King of Patan
- Reign: 1745–1758
- Predecessor: Vishnu Malla
- Successor: Vishvajit Malla
- Born: Kantipur
- Died: 1758
- Dynasty: Malla
- Father: Jagajjaya Malla
- Mother: Kumudini Devi

Rajya Prakash Malla (Newar: 𑐬𑐵𑐖𑑂𑐫𑐥𑑂𑐬𑐎𑐵𑐱 𑐩𑐮𑑂𑐮), also spelled Rajyaprakash, was a Malla dynasty king and the King of Patan. He succeeded his brother-in-law Vishnu Malla and reigned from 1745 until his death in 1758.

== Early life ==
Rajyaprakash was the third son of Jagajjaya Malla, king of Kantipur. His eldest brother and the heir apparent of Kantipur Rajendra Malla died while he was young. Some nobles wanted Rajyaprakash to be the successor to Kantipur instead of his brother Jaya Prakash Malla. However, King Jagajjaya rejected this proposal and Jayaprakash succeeded Jagajjaya. Suspecting a coup from Rajyaprakash, Jayaprakash expelled him from Kantipur and he fled to Patan. Later, King Vishnu Malla, also his brother-in-law, nominated him as his successor to the throne of Patan.

== Reign ==
Rajyaprakash succeeded Vishnu Malla in 1745. His reign was full of political turmoil. The court officials of Patan, pramanas, exercised more power than Rajyaprakash. Rajyaprakash went blind in 1752 and died six years later in 1758. A lot of places south of Patan had already been annexed by Prithvi Narayan Shah of Gorkha when Rajyaprakash died.

Like his predecessors, Rajyaprakash, was also a religious monarch. He donated lands and money to temples and guthis. The courtiers of Patan installed Visvajit Malla on the throne after the death of Rajyaprakash in 1758.

== Literary works ==
Rajya Prakash Malla is known to have written a drama in the Newar language named Ekādaśacaritra nāṭaka.

Preceded by Vishnu Malla	King of Patan; 1745–1758	Succeeded by Vishvajit Malla
