= Kingdom of Lalitpur =

Former kingdom in Nepal

Kingdom of Lalitpur 𑐫𑐮 𑐡𑐾𑐱 (Newar)
- 1482–1768
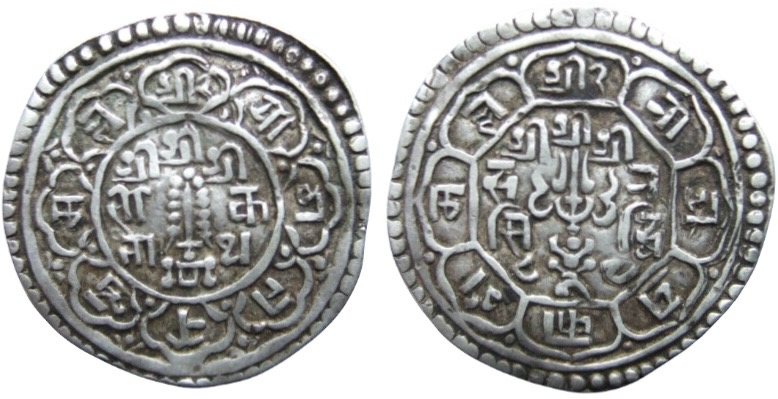
- Coin of King Rajya Prakash Malla with coin legend in the Newar script, 1745 CE.
- Capital: Patan Durbar
- Common languages: Newar (official); Sanskrit (theology)
- Religion: Newar Hinduism and Newar Buddhism
- Government: Monarchy
- History
  - Establishment: 1482
  - Gorkha conquest: 1768
- Currency: Mohar
| Preceded by | Succeeded by |
| Malla dynasty (Nepal) | Kingdom of Nepal |
- Today part of: Nepal

The Kingdom of Lalitpur (Nepali: ललितपुर राज्य, Lalitapura Rājya), also known as Patan, was a kingdom ruled by the Malla dynasty of Nepal established in 1482 after King Yaksha Malla's death. His sons divided the kingdom into four parts: Bhaktapur, Kantipur, Lalitpur, and Banepa.

In 1768, It became part of the Gorkha Kingdom―present day Kingdom of Nepal―after an aggressive unification campaign launched by Prithvi Narayan Shah.

== Prior history ==
Aridev Malla started the Malla dynasty and ruled over the entire Kathmandu Valley from 1202. The lineage of Aridev ended with Jayadeva Malla in 1258, thereafter Patan was ruled alternately from Bhadgaon, and Banepa by the Tripuras, and the Bhontas. The monarchs, however, held almost non-significant control over Patan and the local lords had much of the authority as evidenced by the failed seizure of Bhadgaon by the local lords. After Jayasthiti Malla imprisoned and killed fifty-three prominent leaders of Patan, the local lords surrendered their complete authority to the monarchy in 1372.

Patan had also been a victim of numerous invasions in the valley. The third invasion from the Khasa Kingdom had caused significant damage to the locals, and the Khasas also destroyed a royal castle before returning. The Tirhuts invaded the valley in 1311 and destroyed several temples in Patan, inflicted fines, and burnt houses. In 1334, Punya Malla, another King from the Khasa Kingdom, entered Patan killing forty men on their way and imposing fines upon the citizens.

== Patan under Simhas: 1482–1600 ==
=== Reign ===
After the Kathmandu Valley divided into four parts in 1482, the sons of Yakshya Malla ruled over separate areas of the valley. Ratna Malla ruled over Kantipur, Raya Malla over Bhadgaon, and Rana Malla over Banepa. The brothers ruled over Patan jointly for a brief period until it fell into the authority of Simha dynasty. Even before the division of the valley, the feudal lords held significant control over their territories and Jaya Simha was one of such lords.

The division left the successors of Yakshya Malla in a weak position and they gradually lost control of Patan. Before Vishnu Simha, the great-grandson of Jaya Simha, the Simhas shared their authority with other feudal lords and pledged their allegiance to the monarchy. There were three notable feudal houses before, but as early as 1519, Vishnu Simha had ousted the other two houses, ignored the monarchy, and made Patan an independent kingdom. Although the nature of the sovereignty of Patan is still a topic of discussion among scholars, it is clear from the inscriptions that the Simhas had absolute rule over Patan. Patan, however, had a significantly smaller area than it would later gain under the Mallas.

Vishnu Simha died around 1560 and his three sons ruled jointly over Patan. Two of his three sons died before 1580, and then onward Purandar Simha reigned as the sole ruler. In some time between 1597 and 1603, Shivasimha Malla of Kantipur raided Patan and brought it under his control, thus re-incorporating Patan under the reign of Kantipur. He then installed his first son Harihara Simha Malla as the governor of Patan.

=== Family Tree of the Simhas ===
Following is the family tree of the Simhas.

Jaya Simha
Kirti Simha
Kusum Simha | Jayalakshmi
Padmavati | Vishnu Simha | Kamalalakshmi
Narasimha Simha | Purandar Simha | Uddav Simha

== Patan under Mallas: 1600–1768 ==
Around 1600, Shivasimha Malla of Kantipur brought Patan under his control and installed his son Harihara Simha as the governor. Harihara Simha died shortly after that, and his first son Siddhi Narasimha Malla acted as the governor. Shiva Simha died in 1619, and Siddhi Narasimha declared Patan independent from Kantipur, which was then ruled by his brother Lakshmi Narasimha Malla. The descendants of Siddhi Narasimha then ruled Patan until its annexation by the Gorkha Kingdom.

=== 1600–1705 ===
Siddhi Narasimha Malla reigned from 1619 to 1661 and his was a generally peaceful reign. He was an extremely religious king who built several temples and performed rituals regularly. Siddhi Narasimha had maintained friendly relations with Ram Shah of Gorkha, and the Tirhuts. Kantipur, however, had a strained relationship with Patan during the reign of Pratap Malla. Siddhi Narasimha went on a religious exile in 1657 and his son Srinivasa Malla was crowned as the king in 1661.

Between 1658 and 1662, Patan indulged in multiple conflicts with Kantipur, and Bhadgaon, sometimes as Kantipur's ally and other as Bhadgaon's. It was Srinivasa Malla who ultimately mediated the quarrel in 1662 and peace was restored. During his reign, Patan extended as far as Gorkha and Tanahun in the west.

Srinivasa abdicated in favour of his son in 1687, and accordingly, Yoga Narendra Malla succeeded him as the king. Yoga Narendra's reign also saw numerous conflicts with the neighbouring kingdoms between 1688 and 1690. A prominent minister named Lakshminarayan who had risen as the supreme authority in the valley was assassinated in 1690, and the disputes subsided for a while. Yoga Narendra, like his father and grandfather, was a king of religious deposition. He donated various items to temples and constructed several religious monuments. Yoga Narendra was poisoned in Changu while he was supervising an attack against Bhadgaon.

=== 1705–1722 ===
Yoga Narendra died without any male heirs and was succeeded by his infant grandson Loka Prakash Malla, through his daughter Yogamati, in 1705. Because Loka Prakash was at an early age, Yogamati exercised royal powers. He reigned for eleven months only and died of smallpox. Indra Malla succeeded Loka Prakash and reigned for three years. He was a nephew of Yoga Narendra through his sister Manimati, and thus a grandson of Srinivasa Malla. During his reign, he drove away Rajeshwaridevi, a concubine of Yoga Narendra Malla, to Tanahu, and Mahindra Malla, her son, was born there. Indra Malla died in 1709 and Yogamati installed Vira Narasimha Malla, of unknown ancestry, as the king. However, Vira Narasimha held insignificant authority and a young Mahindra Malla succeeded him in the same year.

The volatile government of Patan, that saw three kings within four years, experienced a brief period of stability when Mahindra ascended the throne. During his reign, his mother Rajeshwaridevi exercised real authority and Yogamati had become powerless. Mahindra Malla died while he was thirteen years of age and was succeeded by Riddhi Narasimha Malla, another nephew of Yoga Narendra through his sister Rudramati. He is said to have been installed as the king by Yogamati to further grow her powers. He died after just two years of reign in 1717.

Riddhi Narasimha's death brought another political crisis in Patan. The local lords wanted Ranajit Malla of Bhadgaon to take over as the king. Ranajit Malla, seeing this opportunity, tried to invade Patan but was soon captured and let go on payment. Due to the influence of Yoagamati, Bhaskara Malla of Kantipur was proclaimed as the king. Even though the two kingdoms were ruled by the same king, Kantipur and Patan existed as two separate political entities. Bhaskara Malla, who reigned as Mahindrasimha Malla in Patan, sent his two wives to act as regent and he himself rarely visited Patan. An epidemic broke out during Mahindrasimha's reign that killed about 20,000 people within the span of three years. Mahindrasima himself was a victim of the plague and died in 1722. Patan separated itself from the rule of the king of Kantipur after his death.

=== 1722–1768 ===
Yoga Prakash Malla, of unknown ancestry, succeeded Mahindrasimha. He died in 1729 and then followed Vishnu Malla, a descendant of Srinivasa Malla. Vishnu Malla had married the daughter of Jagajjaya Malla of Kantipur to strengthen their friendship. Kantipur and Patan, with the help of Gorkha, attacked Bhadgaon several times during the reign of Vishnu Malla, which suggests that the influence of Gorkha had started to become obvious in the valley. Vishnu Malla had appointed Rajya Prakash Malla, his brother-in-law, who was expelled by his brother Jaya Prakash Malla from Kantipur, as his heir. Rajya Prakash succeeded Vishnu Malla in 1745 but the Kajis (ministers) of Patan held more authority than the king. Worse than that, Prithvi Narayan Shah had started his unification campaign, and with Tanahu and Gorkha acting as catalysts, Patan went through a series of clashes against its own neighboring kingdoms. Rajya Prakash died in 1758 and was succeeded by Vishvajit Malla. Vishvajit Malla is said to have been murdered, in 1760, by the Kajis on the account of having an illicit relationship with a daughter of a Kaji. It is also possible that he committed suicide due to the fear of the same.

The Kajis constantly shuffled kings after Vishvajit Malla first installed Jaya Prakash Malla of Kantipur.
