= Phuntsog Namgyal II =

King of Sikkim (from 1733 to 1780)

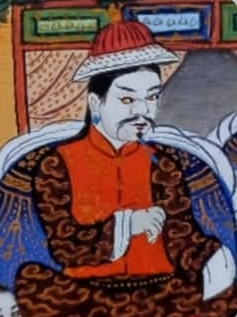

Chogyal of Sikkim
- Reign: 1733–1780
- Predecessor: Gyurmed Namgyal
- Successor: Tenzing Namgyal
- Born: 1733
- Died: 1780 (aged 46–47)
- Issue: Tenzing Namgyal
- House: Namgyal dynasty
- Father: Gyurmed Namgyal
- Mother: a nun from Sanga Choeling Monastery
- Religion: Buddhism

Phuntsog Namgyal II (Sikkimese: ཕུན་ཚོག་རྣམ་རྒྱལ་; Wylie: phun tshog rnam rgyal) was the fifth Chogyal (king) of Sikkim. He succeeded Gyurmed Namgyal in 1733 and was succeeded himself by Tenzing Namgyal in 1780.

Early in his reign, a powerful Bhutia minister named Tamding attempted to overthrow the Chogyal, declaring himself king in opposition in 1738. For three years, a civil war raged between supporters of the Chogyal and supporters of Tamding before the pretender was defeated, but unrest continued in the kingdom. Tibet dispatched Rabden Sharpa as a regent in 1747 to help restore order. He not only restored peace to Sikkim but introduced an annual census and taxation system to Sikkim. Rabden also introduced the Mangsher Convention, Sikkim's first constitution, defining the powers and responsibilities of Sikkimese government bodies.

In 1770, the same year the Chogyal died, there was a brief attempt at an invasion by Bhutan, but it was soon repelled by the Sikkimese.

Phuntsog Namgyal II Namgyal Dynasty Born: 1733 Died: 1780
Regnal titles
Preceded by Gyurmed Namgyal	Chogyal of Sikkim; 1733–1780	Succeeded by Tenzing Namgyal
