= Jaya Prakash Malla =

18th-century King of Kantipur

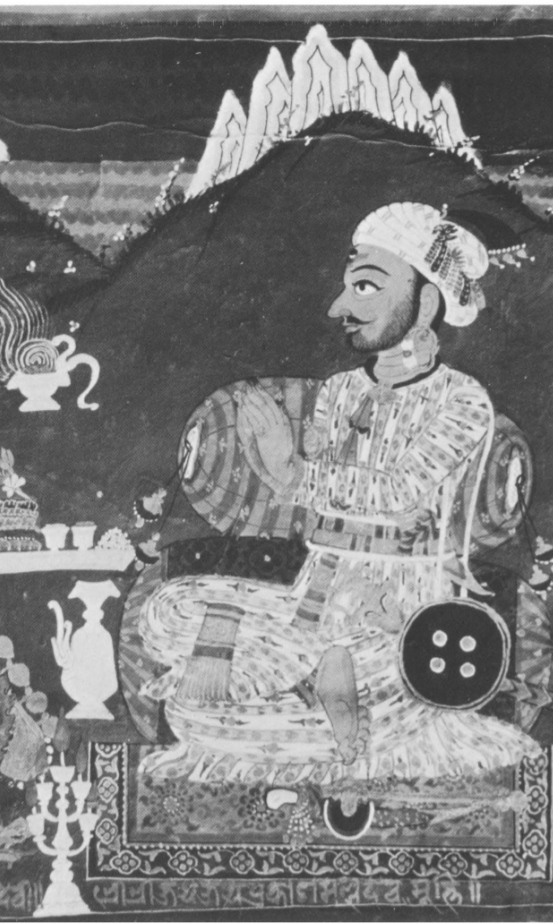
- Portrait of Jaya Prakasa Malla from 1765

King of Kantipur
- Reign: 1736–1746
- Predecessor: Jagajjaya Malla
- Successor: Jyoti Prakash Malla
- Reign: 30 April 1750– 25 September 1768
- Predecessor: Jyoti Prakash Malla
- Successor: position abolished

King of Lalitpur (Patan)
- Reign: 1760—1761
- Predecessor: Vishvajit Malla
- Successor: Ranajit Malla
- Born: Kantipur, Nepal
- Died: 1769; Pashupatinath
- Spouse: Daya Lakshmi
- Issue: Jyoti Prakash Malla
- Dynasty: Malla dynasty
- Father: Jagajjaya Malla
- Mother: Kumudini Devi

Jaya Prakash Malla (Newar: 𑐖𑐫𑐥𑑂𑐬𑐎𑐵𑐱 𑐩𑐮𑑂𑐮) was a king of the Malla dynasty who served as the last Malla king of the Nepalese state of Kantipur. He ruled from 1736 to 1746 after succeeding his father Jagajjaya Malla, and then was under exile from 1746 until his restoration on 30 April 1750 from when he ruled Kantipur until his defeat by the Shahs on 25 September 1768. He has made significant contributions to the literature of Newar language as well as to the culture of Kathmandu as he started many of the city's important festival like the Kumari Jatra as well contributed to the architectural development of Kathmandu.

== Early life ==
Jayaprakash Malla's elder brother and the heir apparent of Kantipur Rajendra Malla died when he was young. Some courtiers and nobles requested the king to declare Jayaprakash's younger brother Rajyaprakash the heir instead of Jayaprakash. Jayaprakash's rivalry with the nobles began after the king decided that Jayaprakash would succeed him after his death.

== Reign ==
=== Conflict with brothers ===
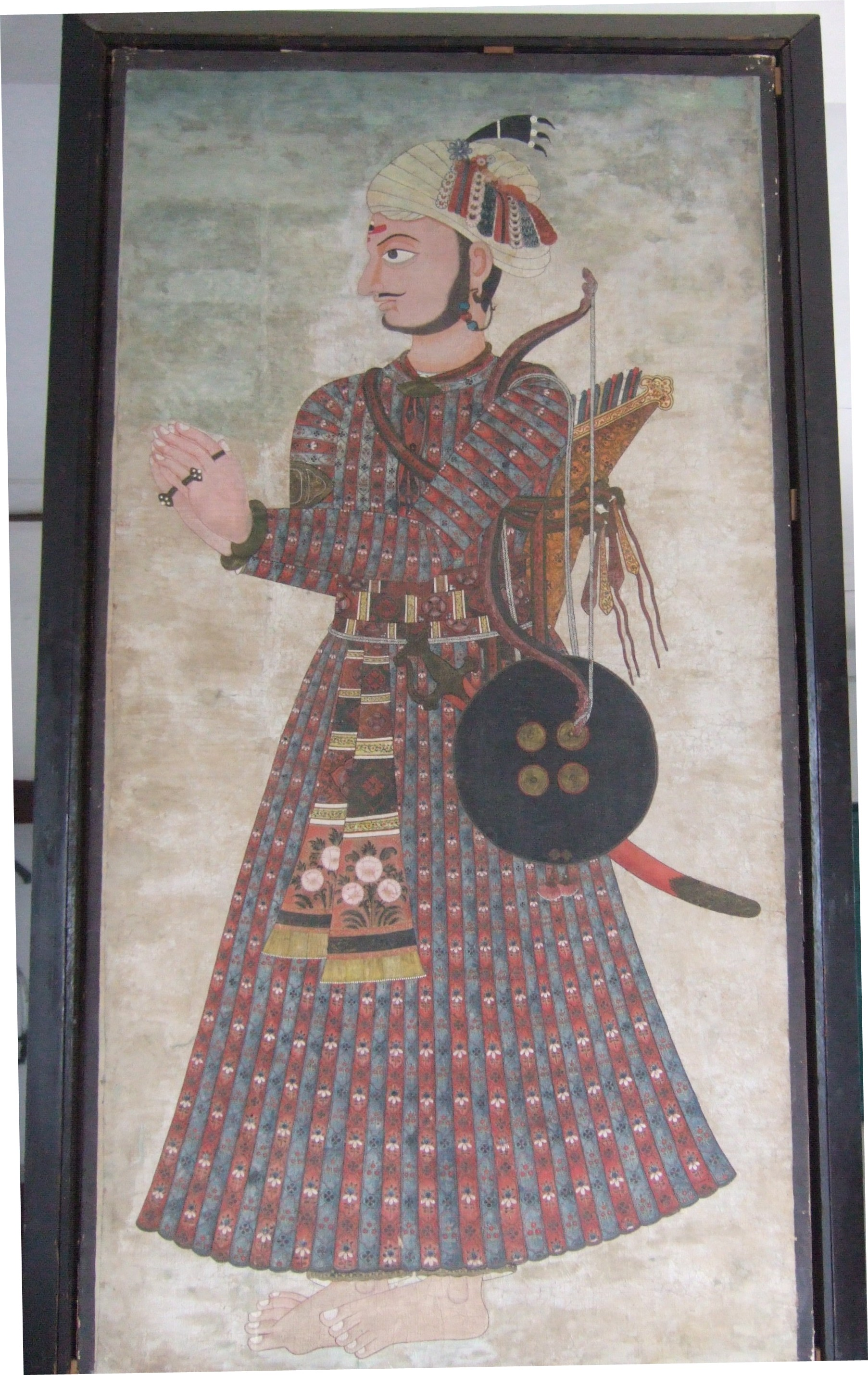
Portrait at the National Museum of Nepal

He ascended the throne after his father died in 1736. Suspecting a coup from his brother and the nobles, he expelled his brother Rajyaprakash during the time of mourning for his father. Rajyaprakash was adopted as the heir by Vishnu Malla, the then King of Patan.

After a short while, some palace officials conspired and proclaimed his younger brother Narendraprakash as the ruler of the north-eastern part of the kingdom. Jayaprakash defeated Narendraprakash after four months and Narendraparakash fled to Bhadgaon where he died.

=== Invasion from Gorkha ===
In 1737, Narabhupal Shah of Gorkha attacked Nuwakot but was quickly defeated by Jayaprakash Malla.

In 1744, Prithvi Narayan Shah attacked Nuwakot again and annexed it from Kantipur.

When Prithvi Narayan Shah attacked Nuwakot, a protectorate of Kantipur, Jayaprakash sent troops under Kashiram Thapa. The battle occurred in 1746 where Kashiram Thapa lost the war and Jayaprakash Malla thought of deceit. Jaya Prakash Malla was angered and killed him. In the day of Indrajatra, when there was festival going on, Prithvi Narayan Shah attacked Yen (Kantipur). Jaya Prakash Malla was helpless and he went to Lalitpur to seek asylum. Tej Narasimha Malla ruled that kingdom. After some time Prithvi Narayan Shah attacked Lalitpur and Jaya Prakash Malla along with Tej Narasimha Malla ran to Bhaktapur to seek asylum. When Prithvi Narayan Shah attacked Bhaktapur, Ranajit Malla surrendered. Later, Ranajit Malla was sent to Kashi to spend rest of his life; Jaya Prakash Malla died and Tej Narasimha Malla was kept in lifetime detention.

== Personal Details ==
=== Relationship with his wife ===
The wife of Jaya Prakasa was the queen consort Dayā Lakshmi (Newar: 𑐡𑐫𑐵𑐮𑐎𑑂𑐲𑑂𑐩𑐷), also known as Dayāvati. He has signed some of his Classial Newar poems as "dayā lakshmi pati", translating to "the lord of Daya Lakshmi".

In 1746, Daya Lakshmi would ally with the nobility of the kingdom to depose and exile him and in his place install their eighteen-month-old son, Jyoti Prakasa as the king, towards whom the nobility swear an oath of allegiance. The people of Kantipur had become wreary of the threat of the Gorkhalis after they stationed their troops in Changu and therefore sought help from his brother Rajya Prakash Malla of Patan. However, Rajya Prakasa allied with the Thari Taudhik, who had partnered with Daya Lakshmi and had Jaya Prakasa arrested during the Mohani of 1746. During this time Jaya Prakasa was forced to flee and live in exile and was reported by the Capuchins as having lived in caves and hide-outs, in huts built of straw and sticks. Ultimately, with the help of his mother, Kumudini Devi, and due to the rising unpopularity of Daya Lakshmi among the nobility, he'd be restored back to the throne on 30 April 1750.

During the exile, Daya Lakshmi had an affair with a person named Garudasimha which greatly reduced her popularity among her subjects and strained her relationship with Taudhik and was one of the reasons for her rising unpopularity among the nobility. In 1753, the Capuchins reported that his wife Daya Lakshmi was accused of committing adultery with the son of the royal preceptor, after which both were imprisoned by Jaya Prakasa Malla. He then is reported by the Capuchins to have "cut the paramour to pieces in the presence of the queen". Father Tranquilis, a haughty Capuchin confronted Jaya Prakasa over this act calling it unjust and cruel to which Jaya Prakasa replied "What am I to do? If my subjects would obey the law of the true God, His Majesty would surely set everything right, but they do not want to obey, adore and serve Him, and so they are chastised and ruled over despotically".

In his play Ratneshwar Pradurbhav dated to around 1745, he has written many poems expressing his love for Daya Lakshmi.

His son from her, Jyoti Prakasa Malla, who was the heir to the throne died on 27 April 1763.

=== Relationship with Briddhi Lakshmi ===
Briddhi Lakshmi was the queen consort to Ranajita Malla of neighbouring Bhaktapur. When she gave birth to her first child on 20 July 1738, the child from Ranajita Malla's concubine Jaya Lakshmi had been the heir apparent and had already reached maturity, and Jaya Lakshmi used her inertia to stop Briddhi Lakshim's son from replacing the position of her own son. The life of Briddhi Laskhmi's son itself became a matter of concern and with the help of some allies she had withdrawn to Thimi in April 1740. Not long after her flight to Thimi, the people of Thimi, Nala and Nagadesh would declare their allegiance to her by accepting her infant son as monarch. Jaya Praksha supported Briddhi Lakshmi in the uprising and his support of her led to a minor war with Ranajita Malla in June 1740. Eventually, Thimi itself would become unsafe for her and on 20 July 1740, Briddhi Lakshmi used a pretext of a ritual bath in the river Bagmati, to escape Thimi with her son, whereby she immediately headed for Hanumandhoka in Kathmandu, where according to the Capuchin Cassiano Beligatti, Jaya Prakasha gave her an apartment with guards. Beligatti further wrote "The action of the queen was much talked about in all the three kingdoms, even though she did that only in order to safeguard the life of the little king".

As to what happened to her after her arrival in Hanumandhoka or when she returned to Bhaktapur is unknown as no clear sources have been found. The next source to mention Briddhi Lakshmi or her son is in February 1747 (NS 868 phalguna sukla 7) when a Buddhist monastery in Bhaktapur invited her son during its inauguration ceremony.

=== Personality ===
The historian Dilli Raman Regmi described Jaya Prakasa Malla as having an overbearing manner, haughty temper and suspicious mind and deemed him largely responsible for the conquest of Nepal by the Gorkhalis.

Perceval Landon, the British traveler, described Jaya Prakasa as a capable and valiant but headstrong, flawed and self-destructive ruler noting his inability to maintain an alliance with the other kings of Nepal and alienation of potential allies. He describes Jaya Prakasa's final stand as "mad but valiant," though he ultimately holds him largely responsible for the fall of Nepal.

The authors Prem Bahadur Kansakar and Janak Lal Vaidya meanwhile have a sympathetic view on him, based primarily on their analysis of his Classical Newar literature, particularly his two plays, Ratneshwar Pradurbhav and Birdhwojopakhyan Natakam. In Birdhwojopakhyan Natakam, they observe that Jaya Prakasa demonstrates awareness of his own flaws and criticizes his shortcomings. Similarliy in Ratneshwar Pradurbhav they note his expression of patriotic spirits and concern for his people. Kansakar and Vaidya also highlight his lack of animosity toward his queen Daya Lakshmi, toward whom he expresses devotion, and his prayers for the protection and victory of his son Jyoti Prakasa. They ultimately conclude that "these are genuine qualities [of Jaya Prakasa] worth remembering".

Henry Amborse Oldfield, the physician to Jung Bahadur Rana was also sympathetic to Jaya Prakasa Malla, calling him, along with the Newar people, as a gallant ruler who resisted the Gorkhali invasion and impilictly attributes the fall of Jaya Prakasha to the overwhelming force of the Gorkhali army rather than his own personal failure.

The Italian Capuchin Marco della Tomba who was a contemporary of Jaya Praksa wrote on him as "name of the king of Nepal, and a friend of the Capuchins".

== Literary works ==
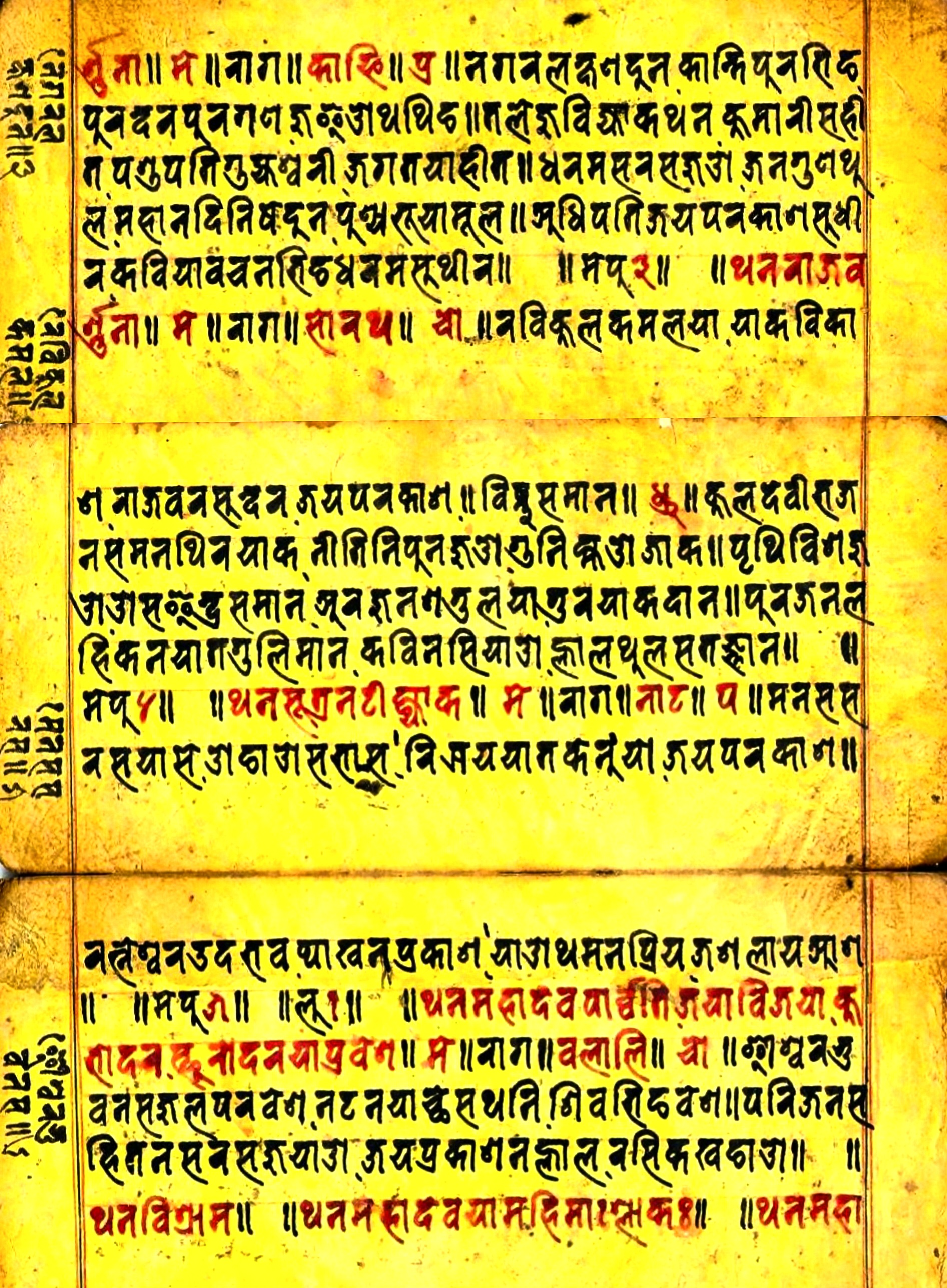
A manuscript of Ratneshvara-pradurbhava Pyakhan, written by Jaya Prakash in the Newar script.

He contributed to the literature of Newar language with works such as "Padma Samuchaya" and other three dramas that were concerned with Hindu legends being Ratneshwar Pradurbhav, Birdhwojopakhyan Natakam and Bhairavpradurbhav.
