= Loka Prakash Malla =

18th-century King of Patan

King of Patan
- Reign: 1705–1706
- Predecessor: Yoga Narendra Malla
- Successor: Indra Malla
- Born: c. 1697; Nepal
- Died: 1706
- Spouse: Bhagyavati
- Dynasty: Malla
- Mother: Yogamati

Loka Prakash Malla (Newar: 𑐮𑑀𑐎𑐥𑑂𑐬𑐎𑐵𑐱 𑐩𑐮𑑂𑐮), also known as Lokaprakash, was a Malla dynasty king and the King of Patan. He succeeded Yoganarendra Malla as the king in 1705 and reigned for a brief period of eleven months.

== Life ==
Lokaprakash was the son of Yogamati, the daughter of Yoganarendra Malla. Yoganarendra had died without any heirs and the feudal lords of Patan installed Lokaprakash as the ruler. Since Lokaprakash was an infant, his mother was influential in the kingdom. Lokaprakash died after eleven months of reign due to smallpox and was succeeded by Indra Malla, the son of a sister of Yoganarendra Malla.

Preceded by Yoga Narendra Malla	King of Patan; 1705–1706	Succeeded by Indra Malla
