= Jagajjaya Malla =

18th-century King of Kantipur

King of Kantipur
- Reign: 1722–1736
- Predecessor: Bhaskara Malla
- Successor: Jayaprakash Malla
- Died: 1736
- Spouse: Kumudini Devi
- Issue: Rajendra Malla; Jayaprakash Malla; Rajya Prakash Malla; Narendraprakash Malla; Chandraprakash Malla
- Dynasty: Malla

Jagajjaya Malla (Newar: 𑐖𑐐𑐖𑑂𑐖𑐫 𑐩𑐮𑑂𑐮) was a Malla ruler and the thirteenth king of Kantipur, comprising the Kathmandu Valley. He succeeded Bhaskara Malla in 1722 as the King of Kantipur. Jagajjaya was the grandson of Mahipatendra Malla (son of Pratap Malla).

== Reign ==
Jagajjaya Malla's reign was generally peaceful and no any significant battles took place during his reign although minor disputes repeated frequently with Bhupatindra Malla of Bhadgaon. Relationship with Patan was better because his daughter was married to the king of Patan, Vishnu Malla. He also received tributes from the kings of Morang, and Makawanpur.

He issued mohar coins that contained his grandfather's (Mahipatendra Malla) as well as his wife's name. Following him, the later kings also inscribed Mahipatendra Malla's name in the coins.

During his reign, Prithvi Narayan Shah had extended his kingdom as far as Nuwakot.

== Life ==
He had a total of 5 sons. His eldest son Rajendra Malla died at a young age which caused a lot of grievances to him. After Rajendra's death, some Khas nobles came to the king and requested that Rajyaprakash, the king's third son, be declared the heir apparent instead of Jayaprakash Malla, the current heir. Noble's resentment against Jayaprakash rose after Jagajjaya Malla decided that Jaya Prakash would succeed him.

He died in 1736 and was succeeded, as he decreed, by Jayaprakash Malla.

== Literary works ==
Jagajjaya Malla is known to have composed nine poems in the Newar language. He also composed a drama named sundar kumara pyakhan in the Newar language.

Preceded by Bhaskara Malla	King of Kantipur; 1722–1736	Succeeded by Jayaprakash Malla
