= Bhaskara Malla =

18th-century King of Kantipur

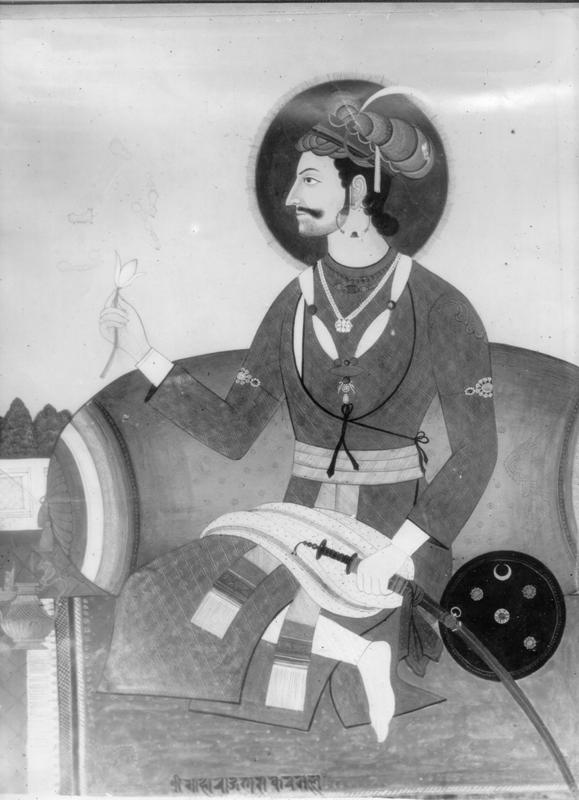
- Portrait at the Jana Bahal Temple

King of Kantipur
- Reign: 1700–1722
- Predecessor: Bhupalendra Malla
- Successor: Jagajjaya Malla
- Regent: Bhuwanalakshmi

King of Patan
- Reign: 1717–1722
- Predecessor: Riddhi Narasimha Malla
- Successor: Yoga Prakash Malla
- Born: 1696
- Died: 1722 (aged 25–26)
- Dynasty: Malla
- Father: Bhupalendra Malla
- Mother: Bhuwanalakshmi

Bhaskara Malla (Newar: 𑐨𑐵𑐲𑑂𑐎𑐬 𑐩𑐮𑑂𑐮), also known as Mahindrasimha Malla (𑐩𑐴𑐶𑐣𑑂𑐡𑑂𑐬𑐳𑐶𑑄𑐴 𑐩𑐮𑑂𑐮) was a Malla ruler and the twelfth king of Kantipur. He succeeded his father Bhupalendra Malla in 1700 as the King of Kantipur and also ruled Patan under the name Mahindrasimha Malla from 1717 until his death in 1722.

== Reign ==
=== Kantipur ===
Bhaskara Malla became the King of Kantipur when he was 4 years old. His mother Bhuwanalakshmi acted as the regent until he came of age and maintained friendly relations with the neighboring kingdoms of Patan, and Bhadgaon. Bhaskara Malla once went on an expedition in Terai and captured several elephants. After that he assumed the title of Gajapati (transl. Lord of the Elephants).

=== Patan ===
After the death of Riddhi Narasimha Malla of Patan in 1717, there were no legitimate heirs. The Kajis of Patan wanted Ranajit Malla, the then heir apparent of Bhadgaon, to take over as the King of Patan. Due to the influence of Yogamati, Bhaskara Malla was proclaimed as the king. He issued coins under the name Gajapati Mahindra Simha.

== Conflicts ==
Bhaskara Malla lived a lavish lifestyle and had allowed luxurious Muslims of Indian origin to settle in Kantipur. This act was not taken well by his ministers and the public who were mostly Newars and Khas. He even appointed a Muslim as his minister which resulted in an uprising in which many Muslims were killed and he sent away all the foreigners.

The Kajis of Patan were also unhappy with his rule and were in constant conflict with him.

== Plague ==
An epidemic broke out during Bhaskara Malla's reign which lasted for 2–3 years and killed approximately 20,000 people. During this time Jhangal Kaji Thakuri kept the king and his two wives at Kindolbahal, near Swayambhunath. After six months of confinement, he inquired about the plague and got assurances that the death rate had fallen significantly. He returned to his palace and died due to the plague in 1722.

== Succession ==
Bhaskara Malla was childless and had nominated Jagajjaya Malla, the grandson of Mahipatendra Malla (Note: Mahipatendra Malla was the son of Pratap Malla and was deprived of his rights as the King.), as his heir of Kantipur. His two queens and two concubines went Sati on his funeral pyre. He was succeeded by Yoga Prakash Malla in Patan.

== Literary works ==
Bhaskara Malla is known to have composed a drama named Dhanyavati Pyakhan in the Newar language.

Preceded by Bhupalendra Malla	King of Kantipur; 1700–1722	Succeeded by Jagajjaya Malla

Preceded by Riddhi Narasimha Malla	King of Patan; 1717–1722	Succeeded by Yoga Prakash Malla
