= Indra Malla =

18th-century King of Patan

King of Patan
- Reign: 1706–1709
- Predecessor: Loka Prakash Malla
- Successor: Vira Narasimha Malla
- Born: Nepal
- Died: 1709
- Dynasty: Malla
- Father: Bauddha Malla
- Mother: Manimati

Indra Malla (Newar: 𑐂𑐣𑑂𑐡𑑂𑐬 𑐩𑐮𑑂𑐮) was a Malla dynasty king and the King of Patan. He succeeded Loka Prakash Malla and reigned from 1706 until his death in 1709.

== Life ==
Indra Malla was the nephew of Yoganarendra Malla through his sister Manimati and thus a grandson of Srinivasa Malla. After the death of Yoganarendra, the local lords of Patan installed Lokaprakash Malla, the grandson of Yoganarendra. But smallpox killed the minor king, Lokaprakash, after only 11 months and Indra Malla succeeded him. He was a religious monarch and donated various items to religious places.

He died in 1709 and was succeeded by Vira Narasimha Malla.

Preceded by Loka Prakash Malla	King of Patan; 1706–1709	Succeeded by Vira Narasimha Malla
