= Srinivasa Malla =

17th-century King of Patan

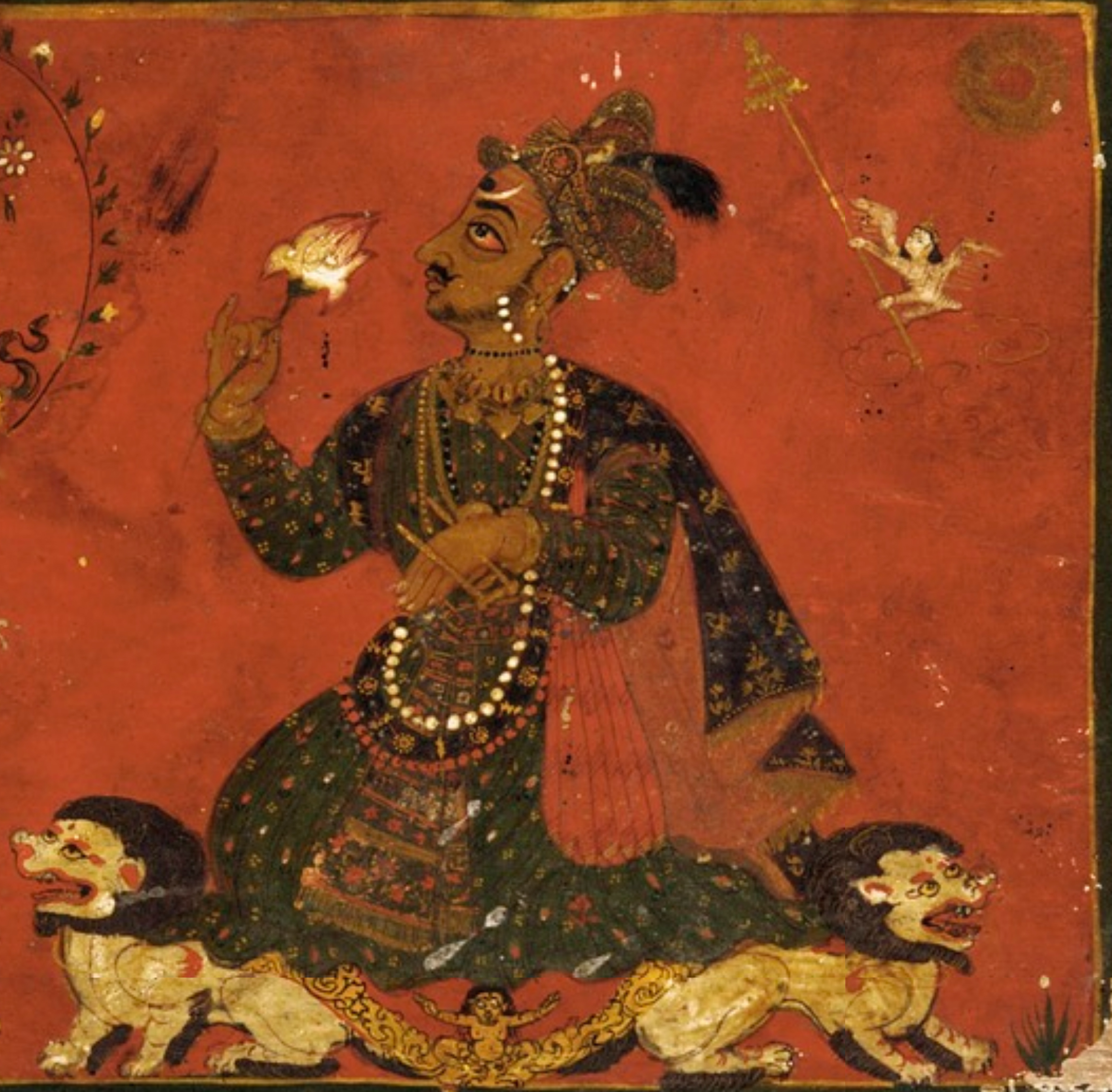
- Miniature of Srinivasa Malla on his throne

King of Patan
- Reign: 1661–1685
- Predecessor: Siddhi Narasimha Malla
- Successor: Yoga Narendra Malla
- Born: 26 October 1627; Lalitpur, Kingdom of Lalitpur, Nepal (Present day Bagmati Province, Nepal)
- Died: 1687 (aged 59–60)
- Spouse: Mrigavati
- Issue: Manimati; Yoga Narendra Malla; Rudramati
- Dynasty: Malla
- Father: Siddhi Narasimha Malla
- Mother: Bhanumati

Srinivasa Malla (Newar: 𑐱𑑂𑐬𑐷𑐣𑐶𑐰𑐵𑐳 𑐩𑐮𑑂𑐮) was a Malla dynasty king and the King of Patan. He was the son of Siddhi Narasimha Malla and reigned on Patan from 1661 until his abdication in 1685.

== Early life ==
Srinivasa Malla was born on NS 747 Āśvina kṛṣṇa dvitīyā translating to 26 October 1627. He was involved in administrative works from an early age by his father Siddhi Narasimha Malla. By 1641. Srinivasa shared the responsibilities with his father and in 1649 he was even recognized as a joint ruler alongside his father.

== Reign ==
Srinivasa's father Siddhinarasimha went to a religious exile in 1657 and Srinivasa was recognized as the King. He was formally crowned as the King of Patan in 1661. During his reign, Patan had a boundary with the Gorkha and Tanahun kingdoms in the west and Gajuripeda in the north-west.

=== Battles with neighboring kingdoms ===
In around 1658, he had a dispute with Pratap Malla of Kantipur and jointly with Jagat Prakash Malla of Bhadgaon, he attacked Kantipur. This benefitted Bhadgaon as its blocked trade routes were re-opened. In the same year, Kantipur and Patan signed an agreement and established friendly relations.

In 1660, Jagat Prakash Malla of Bhadgaon set fire to a small military outpost near Changu which came under the jurisdiction of Kantipur. Jagat Prakash also beheaded eight people and took some people as prisoners. In response to this, Patan and Kantipur jointly launched attacks against Bhadgaon and defeated it. In 1662, Srinivasasa Malla mediated the quarrel between Kantipur and Bhadaon and peace was restored.

=== Succession ===
Srinivasa Malla began to train his son Yoga Narendra Malla from his early age in the kingdom's administrative works. Srinivasa Malla's mother died in 1679, which was followed by the death of one of his wives two years later. In addition to this, a general resentment against his son among the general public was building up due to the involvement of Yoga Narendra in explicit activities. All this caused great distress to him and led to Srinvasa abdicating the throne for his son in 1685.

== Personal life ==
Manuscript of Srinivasa’s Dashavatar Nataka

Srinivasa Malla, like his father, was a king with great religious devotion. He was a Hindu but was liberal to Buddhism as well. He built several temples, renovated many, and gave generous land grants to religious places. He was also interested in literature and wrote dramas in Newar language. He was actively involved in politics until his death in 1687.

== Literary works ==
Srinivas Malla is known to have composed a drama named Dashavatara Nataka in the Newar language. He is also known to have added seven days in Kartik Pyakhan by adding his Bāthaḥ pyākhaṃ. Srinivasa also composed many poems in the Newar language. His poem nārāyaṇa suragana saṃsāra na bhina is considered the longest poem in the Newar language.

Preceded by Siddhi Narasimha Malla	King of Patan; 1661–1685	Succeeded by Yoga Narendra Malla
