= Yoga Narendra Malla =

17th-century King of Patan

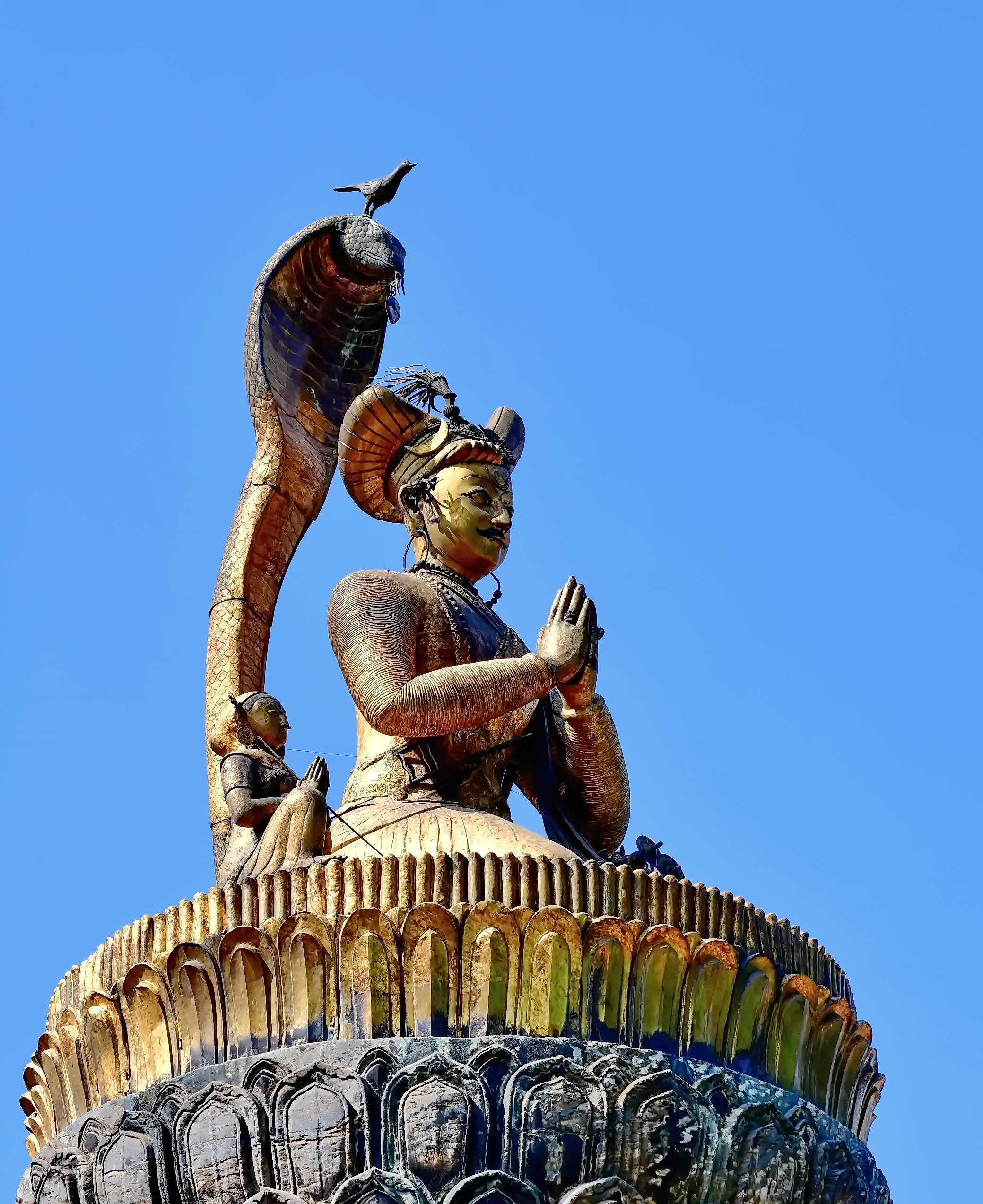
- Gilt copper statue at Patan Durbar Square

King of Patan
- Reign: 1685–1705
- Predecessor: Srinivasa Malla
- Successor: Loka Prakash Malla
- Born: 25 July 1667; Lalitpur, Kingdom of Lalitpur, Nepal (Present day Bagmati Province, Nepal)
- Died: 28 October 1705 (aged 38); Changu, Kingdom of Kantipur, Nepal
- Spouse: Jaya Laksmi
- Issue: Yogamati
- Dynasty: Malla
- Father: Srinivasa Malla
- Mother: Mrigavati

Yoga Narendra Malla (Newar: 𑐫𑑀𑐐𑐣𑐬𑐾𑐣𑑂𑐡𑑂𑐬 𑐩𑐮𑑂𑐮), also known as Yoganarendra, was a Malla dynasty king and the King of Patan. He was the son of Srinivasa Malla and reigned on Patan from 1685 until his death in 1705.

== Early life ==
Yoganarendra was born on NS 787 Śrāvaṇa śukla Caturthī translating to 25 July 1667. He was involved in administering the kingdom from his early age because of his father. However, his relationships with the local feudal lords soon began to deteriorate especially against a person named Bhagirath Bhaiya. Yoganarendra also indulged himself in illicit activities which caused his father to abdicate so that Yoganarendra would be busy ruling the kingdom.

== Reign ==
Srinivasa Malla abdicated in 1685 and Yoganaraendra was crowned as the king in December of the same year. He began to get rid of his enemies and had Bhagirath Bhaiya murdered in 1690. He had a minister named Vamsidhara, who belonged to one of the feudal lords who ruled Patan.

=== Skirmishes with Kantipur and Bhadgaon ===
During the reign of Yoganarendra Malla, numerous skirmishes occurred with the neighboring kingdoms of Kantipur and Bhadgaon. Around 1688, due to the influence of a minister named Lakshminarayan, Patan sided with Kantipur and strengthened the blockade imposed on Bhadgaon. In 1689, Patan switched sides and attacked Kantipur jointly with Bhadgaon and the next year it waged a battle against both Kantipur and Bhadgaon on its own. Lakshminarayan was assassinated in 1690 and the disputes halted for a while. Minor battles also happened between the three kingdoms in 1696 and 1697.

== Succession ==
Yoganarendra had no legitimate heirs when he died and thus a period of political instability began in Patan which lasted for ten years. The feudal lords of Patan first installed Lokaprakash Malla, grandson of Yoganarendra through his daughter, as the King. Lokaprakash died of smallpox only after eleven months of reign and was succeeded by Indra Malla, the son of Yoganarendra's sister Manimati.

== Personal life ==
Like his ancestors, Yoganarendra also was a religious monarch. He reformed many religious activities and also set up an image of Bhima killing Dushasana. He was poisoned to death by an agent of Bhadgaon while he was directing an attack against it on 28 October 1705. At least 21 of Yoganarendra's queens and concubines committed Sati.

His daughter Yogamati was born 22 August 1685.

== Literary works ==
Manuscript of Yoga Narendra’s Vikramaditya Nataka

Yoga Narendra Malla is known to compose two dramas in the Newar language. These are:

- Mādhavānala kāmakuṇḍala
- Vikramāditya Nāṭaka

Preceded by Srinivasa Malla	King of Patan; 1685–1705	Succeeded by Loka Prakash Malla
