= Kingdom of Kantipur =

Kingdom in Medieval Nepal

Coordinates: 27°42′N 85°20′E

Kingdom of Kantipur 𑐫𑐾𑑄 𑐡𑐾𑐱 (Newar)
- 1482–1768
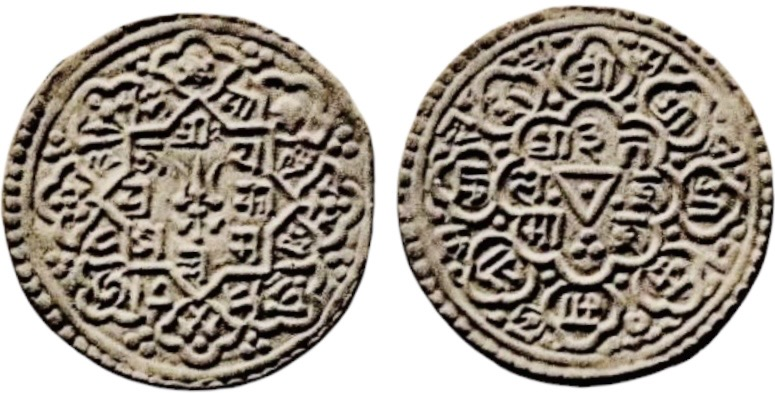
- Coin of King Jaya Prakash Malla with coin legend in the Newar script, 1753 CE.
- Common languages: Newar (official); Sanskrit (religious)
- Religion: Newar Hinduism and Newar Buddhism
- King
  - 1482–1520: Ratna Malla
  - 1560–1574: Mahendra Malla
  - 1735–1768: Jaya Prakash Malla
- History
  - Established: 1482
  - Battle of Kathmandu: 1768
Preceded by	Succeeded by
Malla dynasty (Nepal)	Kingdom of Nepal
- Today part of: Nepal

Kantipur (Nepali: कान्तिपुर राज्य, Kāntipura Rājya) was a medieval kingdom in the Malla confederacy of Nepal, centered in the Kathmandu Valley. It was established in 1482 after King Yaksha Malla died and his sons divided the valley into four kingdoms: Kantipur, Bhaktapur, Patan, and Banepa. The name of the kingdom was derived from a Sanskrit name of its capital city, now known as Kathmandu.

== List of kings ==
- Ratna Malla (1482–1520), son of Yakshya Malla, king of Nepal
- Surya Malla (1520–1530), his son
- Amara Malla (1530–1560), his son
- Mahendra Malla (1560–1574), his son
- Sadashiva Malla (1574–1578), his son
- Siva Simha Malla (1578–1619), his brother
- Lakshmi Narasimha Malla (1619–1641), his grandson
- Pratap Malla (r. 1641–1674), his son
- Nripendra Malla (1674–1680), his son
- Parthibendra Malla (1680–1687), his brother
- Bhupalendra Malla (1687–1700), his son
- Bhaskara Malla (1700–1722), his son, also king of Lalitpur (1717–1722) under the name Mahindrasimha Malla
- Jagajjaya Malla (1722–1736), great-grandson of Pratap Malla
- Jaya Prakash Malla (1736–1746), his son
- Jyoti Prakash Malla (1746–1750)
- Jaya Prakash Malla (1750–1769), restored

== See also ==
- Kathmandu Metropolitan City, District, and Valley
- Kingdom of Lalitpur or Patan
- Kingdom of Bhaktapur or Bhadgaon
