= Ananta Malla =

13th-century King of Kathmandu Valley

King of Nepal
- Reign: 1274 – 14 August 1308
- Predecessor: Jayasimha Malla
- Successor: Jayanandadeva
- Born: 21 April 1246
- Died: 14 August 1308 (aged 62)
- Dynasty: Malla

Ananta Malla (Newar: 𑐀𑐣𑐣𑑂𑐟 𑐩𑐮𑑂𑐮) was the sixth Malla king of Nepal. He succeeded Jayasimha Malla and reigned from 1271 until his death in 1308.

== Reign ==
The reign of Ananta Malla was full of conflicts and political unrest. He himself had sat on the throne after deposing Jayasimha Malla with the help of the House of Bhonta and the duration of his reign was filled with similar attempts against himself. Jayadityadeva, the elder son of Jayabhimadeva and the then-head of the House of Bhonta, was appointed the heir apparent and had the actual control of the administration and Ananta Malla reigned as a puppet ruler.

=== Relationship with Tibet ===
Ananta Malla was close with Tibet, which at that time was a protectorate of Kublai Khan. Nepalese art and culture were highly regarded in Tibet and earlier in 1260, Araniko was sent to Tibet to erect a golden stupa.

=== Invasions from the west ===
From 1287 to 1290, Kathmandu valley faced at least three invasion attempts from the Khasa kingdom which was located west of the valley. Khasa kingdom was also ruled by Mallas from Sinja but they were of different origin from the ones in Kathmandu valley. The first invasion in the December of 1287 was not an invasion per se, but Jayatari Malla (Khasa) entered Kathmandu valley and paid tributes to Swayambhunath. After the villagers fled from their homes, Jayatari Malla withdrew.

On 6 March 1289, Jayatari Malla again entered the valley and burnt several villages. He also visited different temples.

For the third time in 26 February 1290, he ensued even more chaos. He annexed Nuwakot, burnt many villages, and also destroyed a castle of Patan before returning back.

=== Invasions from the south ===
Kathmandu valley also faced invasion attempts from Mithila (then called Tirhut) which was then ruled by the Karnat dynasty. In the December of 1291, the Tirhuts invaded the valley and occupied as far as Bhadgaon. They returned on 22 January 1300 and captured Bhadgaon again and inflicted fines on the House of Tripura. They returned back on March 1292. The chronicles say that this invasion was invited by the Bhontas to weaken the Tripuras.

=== Final years ===
In 1307, frustrated from the constant internal conflicts between Bhontas and Tripuras and from the fact that he held no actual power, he took out all the treasury and offered it to Pashupatinath Temple. He then went to Bhontas and died a year later at Banepa.

== Succession ==
After his death, Nepal went five years without a king and was a victim of several invasions, and conflicts between the two major houses. He was eventually succeeded by Jayanandadeva of House Bhonta, but the actual power lied within the Tripuras.

Preceded by Jayasimha Malla	King of Nepal; 1274–1308	Succeeded by Jayanandadeva
