= Jayadeva Malla =

13th-century King of Kathmandu Valley

King of Nepal
- Reign: 7 June 1255 – 11 January 1258
- Predecessor: Abhaya Malla
- Successor: Jayabhimadeva
- Born: 1 November 1203; Nepal
- Died: 11 January 1258 (aged 54); Nepal
- Dynasty: Malla
- Father: Abhaya Malla

Jayadeva Malla (Newar: 𑐖𑐫𑐡𑐾𑐰 𑐩𑐮𑑂𑐮) was the son of Abhaya Malla and the third Malla king of Nepal. He reigned from his father's death as a result of the 1255 earthquake until his death in 1258.

== Reign ==
The reign of Jayadeva was weak. The dynasty of Aridev Malla was slowly dying out and the local lords were growing powerful.

=== House of Bhonta and Tripura ===
Jayasimha Malla, who was probably a local lord in Bhaktapur, had started gathering political power during the reign of Abhaya Malla. He slowly expanded his control over the entirety of Bhadgaon. Another lord from Banepa, Jayabhimadeva also increased his influence in the surrounding regions of Banepa. The descendants of Jayasimha were called Tripuras and the descendants of Jayabhimadeva were called Bhontas.

The two houses continuously grew their influence over the valley and had, several times, direct battles against Jayadeva.

== Succession ==
After his death in 1258, the two houses made an agreement to alternate the throne and Jayabhimadeva became the king following the agreement. Jayadeva was the last king from the lineage of Aridev Malla.

Preceded by Abhaya Malla	King of Nepal; 1255–1258	Succeeded by Jayabhimadeva
