= Jayasimha Malla =

13th-century King of Kathmandu Valley

King of Nepal
- Reign: January 1258 – April 1271
- Predecessor: Jayabhimadeva
- Successor: Ananta Malla
- Born: 19 April 1229
- Died: 8 November 1287 (aged 58); Nepal
- Issue: Jayatunga Malla
- Dynasty: Malla
- Father: Jagataneka Malla

Jayasimha Malla (Newar: 𑐖𑐫𑐳𑐶𑑄𑐴 𑐩𑐮𑑂𑐮) was the fifth Malla king of Nepal. He succeeded Jayabhimadeva and reigned from 1271 until he was deposed in 1274. His relationship with the dynasty started by Aridev Malla, the first Malla king of Nepal, is unknown.

== Early life ==
Jayasimha was a local lord in Bhadgaon and started gathering political power during the reigns of Abhaya Malla, and Jayadeva Malla. He, along with Jayabhimadeva of Banepa (then called Bhonta), controlled much of the places surrounding them and greatly reduced the powers of the presiding monarch.

== Reign ==
Jayadeva Malla, the last king from the lineage of Aridev Malla, died in 1258. Following his death, Jayasimha and Jayabhimadeva of Bhonta met at Palanchok and came to an agreement to alternate the throne. Jaybhimadeva then started to reign in Nepal and was succeeded by Jayasimha in 1271. Not much is clear about his reign and he was either deposed or abdicated in 1274 after which he was succeeded by Ananta Malla.

Preceded by Jayabhimadeva	King of Nepal; 1271–1274	Succeeded by Ananta Malla
