= The Sparrow's Lost Bean =

The Sparrow's Lost Bean (Nepal Bhasa: चखुंचायागु तंगु कयगू, Chakhunchāyāgu Tangu Kaygu) is a Nepalese folk tale that ranks among the most popular children's stories told among the Newars of Nepal Mandala.

== The story ==
Once upon a time, there was a sparrow who was very neat and clean. Its nest was spotless and it always washed up before eating. One morning, the sparrow found a bean and was overjoyed that it didn't have to search the neighbourhood for food. As was its habit, it went down to the river to wash up after putting the bean away safely on the bridge.

When the sparrow returned expecting to eat a fine breakfast, alas, the bean was nowhere to be found. As it was looking everywhere for its food, it saw a carpenter walking up the bridge. The sparrow went up to the carpenter and said, "I have lost my bean. Please help me find it." "Who's going to listen to you?" said the carpenter and continued on his way.

Just then the sparrow saw a soldier walking up the bridge. It pleaded with him to help find the bean, but the soldier too was uncooperative. "Who's going to help a sparrow?" he said and walked away. Then a captain came up the bridge, but he wouldn't help the sparrow either. And then a minister, but no help from him too. He just laughed and kept walking.

The hungry sparrow became desperate. Then the king came riding on an elephant. The sparrow was certain that it would get justice from the most powerful person in the country. But the king pretended not to hear the sparrow's pleas and said nothing. As the sparrow sat there dejected, an ant came up and asked, "What's the matter? Didn't you see the king pass by?" The sparrow then told the ant how everybody from the carpenter to the king had ignored its appeals to help it find the lost bean.

"Don't worry," said the ant. "We will find the bean somehow." The ant then crawled up to the elephant's ear and said, "Tell the king to find the sparrow's bean or I will go inside your ear and bite you." The terrified elephant turned to the king and said, "You better help the sparrow, oh king, or I will throw you off my back."

The king was startled. He immediately summoned the minister and ordered, "Help the sparrow or you are fired." The minister called the captain right away and said, "Do whatever the sparrow says or you are in trouble." The captain then called the soldier and gave him explicit orders. The soldier, in turn, found the carpenter and told him, "Find the sparrow's bean or I will hang you from this bridge itself." The carpenter searched for half a day and finally found the lost bean, and the sparrow had a satisfying breakfast that day.

== Publications ==
"The Sparrow's Lost Bean" was featured in an anthology of folk tales in Nepal Bhasa published in 1966. A comic book was published by Rajman in 1991.
