= Araniko =

Nepalese artist and architect (c. 1245 – c. 1306)

- Nepali: अरनिको Chinese: 阿尼哥
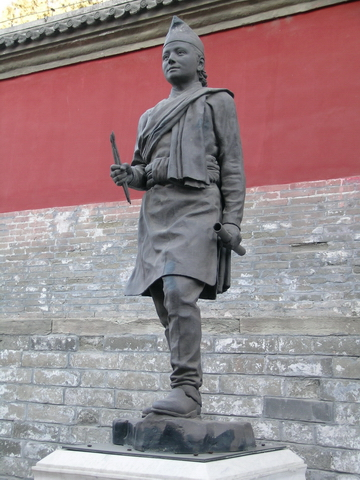
- Statue of Araniko at the Miaoying Temple, Beijing
- Born: 1245; Nepal Mandala (present-day Kathmandu, Nepal)
- Died: 1306 (aged 60–61); Yuan Dynasty
- Known for: Nepalese artist in the court of Kublai Khan
- Notable work: White stupa at Miaoying Temple
- Spouse: 12
- Children: 6
- Memorials: Statue of Araniko at the Miaoying Temple, Beijing

Aniko, Anige or Araniko (Nepali: अरनिको, Chinese: 阿尼哥; 1245–1306) was one of the key figures in the arts of Nepal and the Yuan dynasty of China, and the artistic exchanges in these areas. He was born in Kathmandu Valley during the reign of Abhaya Malla. He is known for building the White Stupa at the Miaoying Temple in Beijing. During the reign of Jayabhimadeva, he was sent on a project to build the Golden Stupa in Tibet, where he also initiated into monkhood. From Tibet, he was sent further to northern China to work in the court of the emperor Kublai Khan, the founder of the Yuan dynasty, where he brought the trans-Himalayan artistic tradition to China. Araniko led a team of 80 artists to Inner China and Tibet to make a number of pagoda-style structures. In his later life, he renounced monkhood and started a family.

To some confusion in translation, his name is variously written as Arniko or Araniko in old texts. A mistake made by Baburam Acharya ascribed his Sanskrit name as Balabahu. However, later he contends that Aniko might possibly be the Chinese pronunciation for the Sanskrit name Aneka. It is also plausible that his name could mean AA Ni Ka, meaning "respectable brother from Nepal".

== Early years ==
Araniko was born in 1245 in Kathmandu Valley, Nepal, when it was ruled by King Abhaya Malla (1216–55). While Nepalese history does not have any record of Arniko and everything that is known of him comes from Chinese accounts, Chinese history and historian Baburam Acharya opines that Araniko could possibly be from Patan, a place famous for sculptures and fine arts. As such, he would have been a Buddhist but his Newar caste is open to speculation. However, it is known that Araniko lived in Kathmandu Valley also during the reign of Jayabhimadeva (1255-71), the successor of Abhaya Malla.

In the Chinese records, the name of his grandfather is given as "Mi-ti-rha" and grandmother as "Kun-di-la-qi-mei", Chinese pronunciation for Sanskrit names Mitra and Kundalaxmi respectively. His father's name was "La-ke-na" (Lakshman) while his mother's name was "Shu-ma-ke-tai".

As is often told in stories about professional artists, Aniko was an artistic prodigy even in his early childhood. An anecdote from his epitaph relates that when he was three years old, his parents took the child to a temple to pay homage to the Buddha. Looking up at a stupa, he asked "who made its wooden stambha, bhumis, anda?" Greatly surprised, the people around realized that he was a born artist. When he was about seven, his temperament was sober like an adult. At school, he mastered his textbooks and became a good calligrapher in such a short time that even the venerable elders acknowledged their inferiority. He could memorize treatises on art as soon as he heard them read. Before he left Nepal for Tibet, he was already an expert in painting, modeling, and casting images.

== Mission to Yuan-China ==
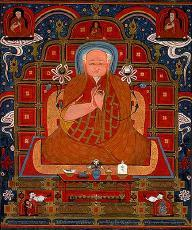
Drogön Chögyal Phagpa, one of the five founders of the Sakya school of Tibetan Buddhism, was appointed as a king of Tibet by the Mongol ruler Kublai Khan (r. 1260–1294).

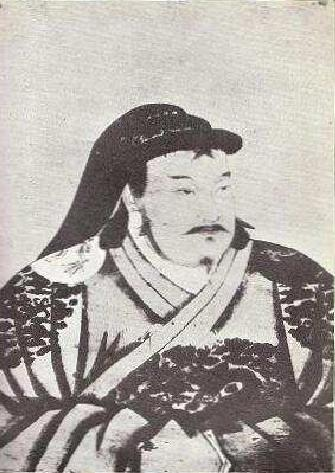
Portrait of young Kublai Khan by Anige (1245–1306), a Nepali artist in Kublai's court

=== Historical background ===
The event that brought Arniko to Tibet, and eventually to the Yuan court in Shangdu (today's Beijing), was Kublai Khan's decree of 1260 CE to Drogön Chögyal Phagpa, the fifth patriarch of Sakya sect of Tibetan Buddhism, to build a golden stupa for Suer chi wa (Tibetan: "Chos rje pa" or "the Lord of Dharma"), that is the Sakya Pandita Kun dga' rgyal mtshan (1182–1251), the fourth patriarch of the sect. Kublai's order was one of the indicators of his acceptance of Sakya teaching.

The timing of the construction, 1260, is worth noticing. In April 1260, Kublai was elected as the Great Khan by his own supporters, to rival the claim of his younger brother Ariq Böke. Thus, a civil war between the brothers for the leadership of the Empire. In the twelfth month of 1260, he appointed Phagpa his Imperial preceptor and granted him a jade seal and the position of leader of Buddhism. By doing so Kublai officially acknowledged Phagpa as his highest religious authority and was obliged to patronize the Sakya teaching. In return, he expected the Sakya sect to provide religious sanction. The building of the stupa was not only a tribute to the Sakya Pandita but intended also as a project to win religious blessings in a critical year. Ariq Böke finally submitted to Kublai at Shangdu on 21 August 1264.

=== Lhasa ===
To build the stupa, Phagpa drafted artisans from Nepal. The iconographies and artistic values of the Tibetans had a close affinity with those of the Nepali tradition. Therefore, it was natural for Phagpa to turn to Nepal for gifted artists. He intended to recruit one hundred artists, but Jayabhimadeva, the king of Nepal at the time, was able to hand over only eighty. With his appointment as Imperial Preceptor in 1260, it must have been his vision and ambition for the future propagation of his sect throughout the still-growing Mongol empire that he tried to scour for more artists.

The artists bound for Tibet were ordered to choose a leader from among themselves. Perhaps due to the uncertainty of their future, nobody was courageous enough to take up the responsibility, except for the confident Arniko. When the king tried to discourage him because of his youth, he replied, "My body is indeed young, but my mind is not." The king eventually made him the team leader of eighty artisans and sent him to Lhasa. He was only seventeen when he departed from Nepal.

In Tibet, Arniko impressed Phagpa at their first meeting in 1261. Phagpa immediately recognized his exceptional artistic skill and administrative ability and entrusted him to supervise the construction. The stupa was built within the Main Hall of the Sakya Monastery. Arniko spent two years on this project. After its completion, Phagpa was unwilling to let him leave when he asked for permission to return to Nepal.

By this time, Kublai Khan had defeated Ariq Böke, and both Kublai and Phagpa must have felt that the construction of the stupa in the Sakya monastery had gained religious merit that contributed to Kublai's military victory and other achievements. As Imperial Preceptor, Phagpa was ready to go to the court and disseminate his sect's teachings. Since no artist in China could make the bewildering array of Himalayan Tantric deities that would be indispensable for his religious activities, he needed to bring with him someone who could. Arniko was a natural choice. Instead of going back to Nepal, Phagpa encouraged him to go to the Mongol court to present himself to Kublai Khan. Phagpa accepted Arniko as his disciple and initiated him into secret Buddhist treaties, thus elevating his social status above an ordinary artisan. Thus having discovered Arniko, Phagpa personally prepared and trained Arniko for his future tasks at the court.

=== Shangdu ===
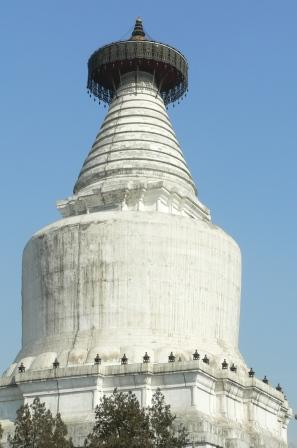
The White Stupa in present-day Beijing

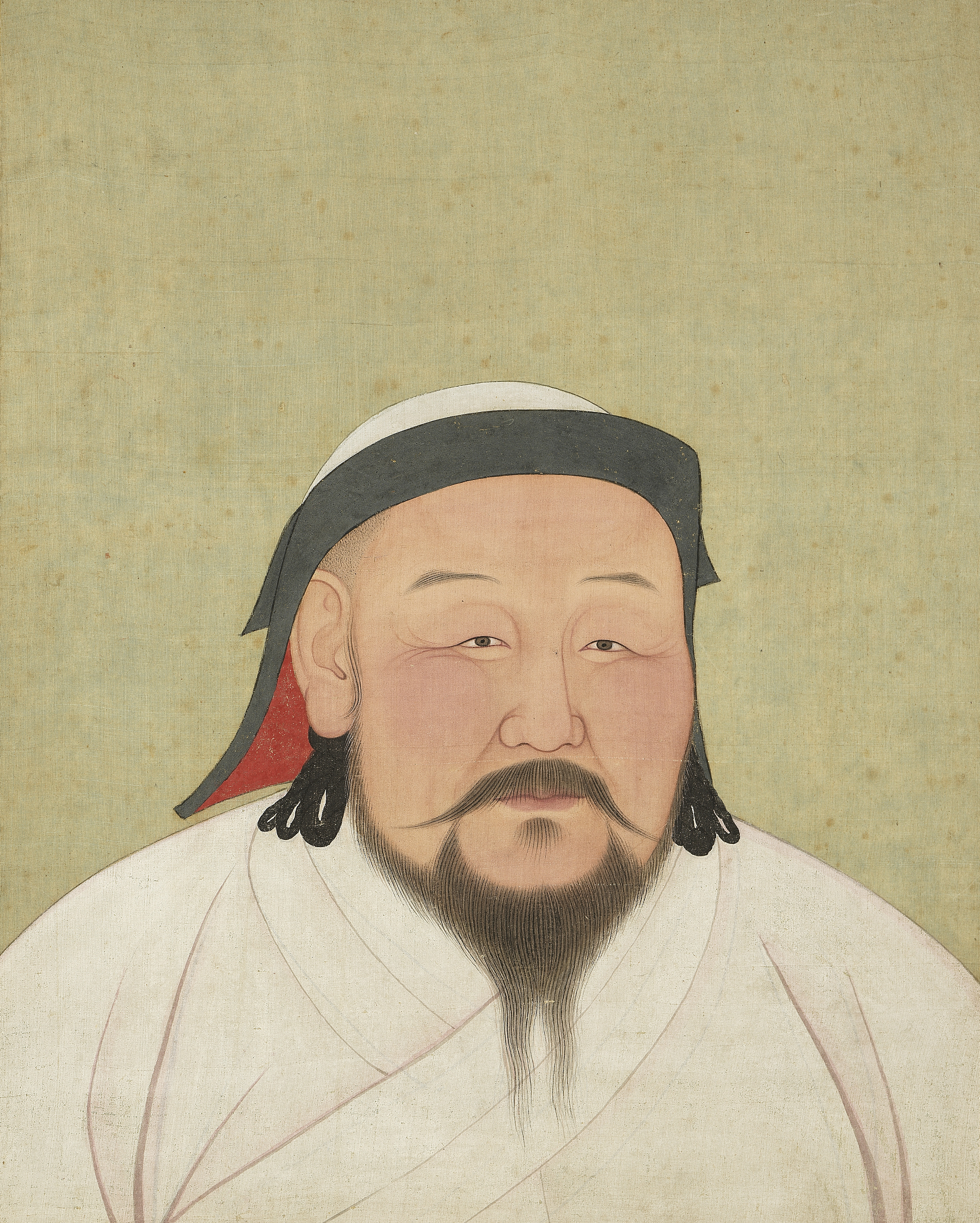
Portrait of Kublai Khan executed shortly after his death in February 1294 by Anige

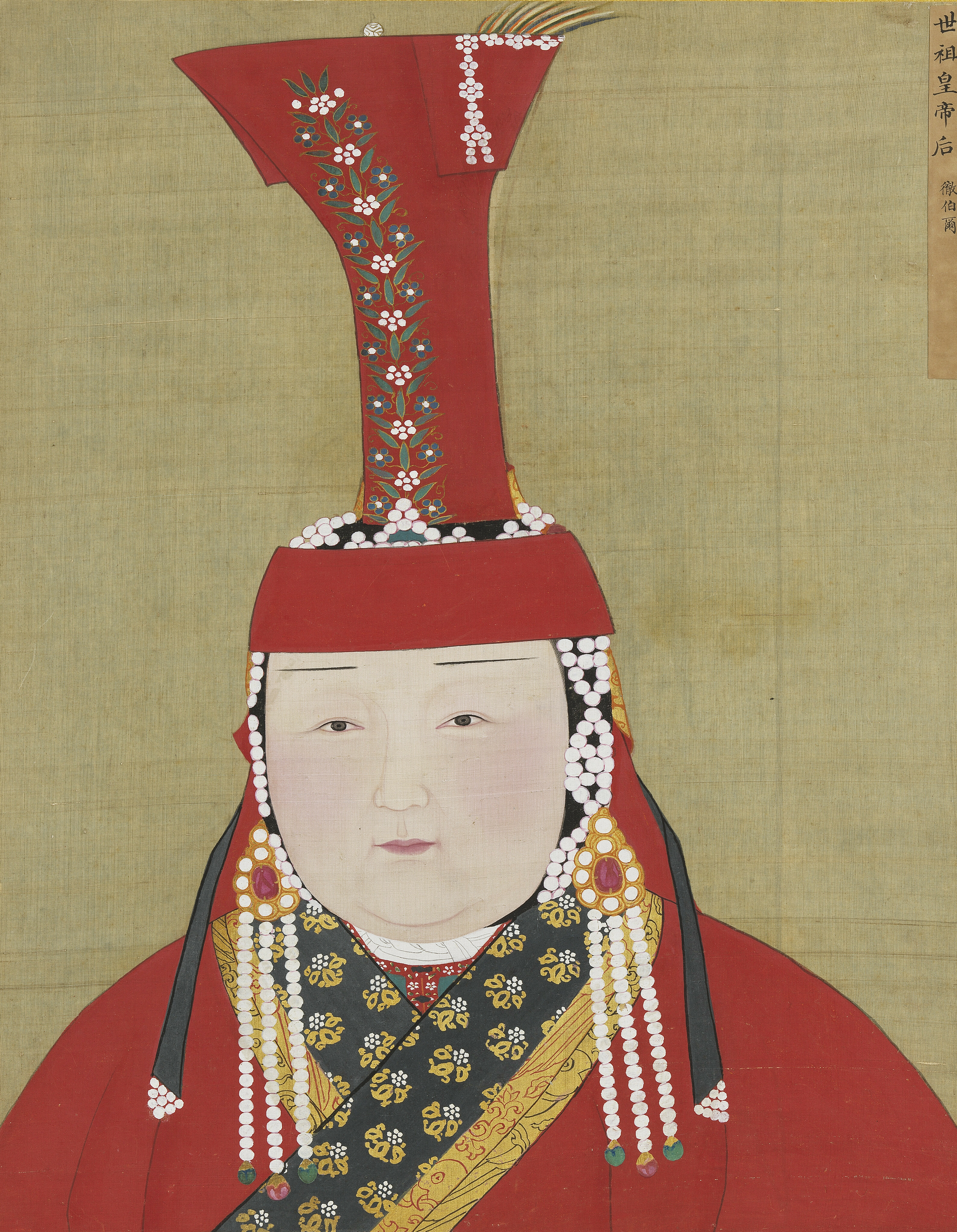
Portrait of Kublai Khan's wife Chabi by Anige

Arniko arrived in Shangdu (Xanadu) by the end of 1262. The following account of the meeting between Arniko and Kublai Khan is recorded by Cheng Jufu :

On hearing his recommendation, the Kublai immediately ordered the envoy to summon him. After he arrived, the Emperor looked at him at length before asking, "Are you afraid to come to the big country?" He answered, "The sage regards people in all directions as his sons. When a son comes to his father, what is there to fear?" "Why do you come?" He replied, "My family has been living in the West for generations. I took the imperial edict to build the stupa in Tibet for two years. I saw constant wars there, and wish Your Majesty could pacify there. I come for sentient beings." "What do you practice?" He said, "I take my mind as my teacher and know roughly painting, casting, and carving."

The Emperor was greatly pleased and asked young Araniko to repair an important bronze idol presented as a gift by a Song emperor. It took him two years to finish the restoration. In the second month of 1265, Arniko finished the restoration and the statue looked so perfect that even the most skilled artists of China greatly admired his work.

In Yuan China, he designed and built many buildings. His most renowned architecture is the White Stupa of Miaoying Temple in Beijing, which was the largest structure at that time. Taking almost ten years (1279–1288 CE) to complete, the Stupa better known as White Dagoba, is still standing today. It rises to a height of 50.9 meters and has a diameter of over 30 meters at its base. Thirteen broad circular bands of molding, called the “Thirteen Heavens,” divide its surface. At the apex of the cone is an umbrella-like bronze disc structure with 36 bronze bells hanging from its rim. At the very top is a small bronze pagoda, in itself a work of art. In 1961, then Chinese Premier Zhou Enlai signed a Proclamation stating that the Temple was to be protected as a National Treasure. This Proclamation kept the White Stupa safe during the Cultural Revolution of the 1960s. In 1976, the temple was seriously damaged by the Tangshan earthquake. The top of the stupa tilted to one side, and the bricks and mortar supporting the stupa crumbled off, and many relics were broken. In 1978, the Beijing Department of Cultural Relics undertook the task of repairing and renovating the temple. As of 2010, the Stupa complex is currently undergoing another renovation.

It is summarized in his epitaph that during his lifetime, Arniko completed three stupas, nine great Buddhist temples, two Confucian shrines, one Daoist temple, and countless images and objects used in and out of the court. Arniko was also a fine painter, and he executed a number of portraits of the imperial family. The portraits of Kublai Khan and his wife Chabi, now located in the National Palace Museum in Taipei, are believed to be his handiwork.

Araniko was accorded with high honors during his lifetime. He was named Director of All Artisan Classes in 1273 and trained many Chinese craftsmen in the Sakya style. By 1274, he was given a silver plate to wear with an image of a tiger on it. The emperor became very fond of him and gave him the title "Duke of Liang" as an honour. Decorated with Ta Sa Thu, an equivalent of a minister, he is among the few foreigners whose biography can be found in Chinese imperial history books. The most important source of Arniko's life and career is his official epitaph written by Cheng Jufu (1249–1314) under Ayurbarwada's (Renzong, r. 1311–20) order of 1316, Liangguo Minhui gong shendao bei (The Spirit-way Stele for Minhui, the Duke of State of Liang), in Cheng Jufu, Cheng Xuelou wenji (The Collective Works of Cheng Jufu). Another important source is Arniko's official biography in Song Lian and Wang Yi, Yuanshi (The Yuan History), compiled under the supervision of the early Ming dynasty. It is largely based on the epitaph but contains some new information as well.

== Death ==
Arniko had six sons, two of whom, Asengge (阿僧哥) and Ashula (阿述腊) followed his career path as artists working for the Yuan dynasty. He lived in China until his death in March 1306 at the age of sixty-two. Of his death Cheng Jufu writes:

On the eighth of March of 1306, he looked at the people around himself and said, "If I am going, you should set up curtains in the hall and a couch, so that I can pass away in peaceful sleep." The next day, he took a bath and went to court. After returning, he appeared ill. Palace envoys and doctors visited, but he passed away in sleep on the eleventh. The emperor grieved over his death after hearing the news and halted the court session. He ordered palace officials to take care of the family and reward the family with twenty-five thousand taels of silver. The Emperor ordered the authorities concerned to make arrangements for the funeral. That night a star fell into the courtyard. The next day saw icicles on the trees. Seven days later, on the seventeenth of March, his remains were cremated according to Nepali custom. On the fifteenth of July, his ashes were buried in the stupa at Gangziyuan, Xiangshan, Wanping County (near the capital).

The inscription on the stele set up in his memory reads:

When the sage (Kublai) arose,
All could behold.
He knew he should come,
As if to parent's home,
Like all the spokes

that merge in the hub,

Like all the brooks

that flow to the ocean.

With sincere minds

and open arms,

Each of them finds

the other man's heart.

Emperor Kublai

has a natural flair.

Nothing he cannot perceive,

nothing he cannot achieve.

The graceful Duke of Liang

is the essence of the West.

Having joined the Sangha,
He traveled to the East.
Enlightening was the teaching,
Like the shining sun.
His words to the Emperor

were modest and excellent.

"Why have you come?"
"For the people of the West."
Extend your virtue,

and expand your kindness.

In the dialogue emerges

a mutual understanding.

The Emperor is virtuous,

and the subject dutiful.

Their words are clement,

their deeds are beneficent.

To his superb skill

all lands pay tribute.

For every thing it is appropriate

to begin and continue,

So that it can last

for thousands of years.

The artists in the past

were by no means stupid.

(But) some had no chance,

Others were not appreciated.

Only the Duke of Liang

twisted gold and cut jade.

The splendid temples he built,
Are towering and majestic.
Who says he was a guest?
He wore royal robes.
Returned to the laity,
He achieved fame and fortune.
His birth was glorious,

his death was grievous.

His began with care,

he ended with grace.

His sons continue his offices,
Good news never ends.
The plain of Wanping
is the place for the Minister.
Luxuriant trees grow
on the undulating hills;
Limpid ripples flow,
In the meandering brooks.
The glory assembled here,
Will last forever.
Why eulogizing in a poem?
The historian completes the order.

== Legacy ==
Arniko's imperial portraits represent the watershed between Song, Yuan and later imperial portraits. The aim of later portraits were no longer to suggest virtuous conduct, but physiognomy. This approach was followed not only in later Yuan imperial portraits but also in the Ming and Qing imperial portraits which became increasingly frontal and rigid, and eventually more and more realistic under the new influence of European portraiture.

The history of Chinese Buddhist art witnessed three major waves of artistic influences from Central and South Asia: Gandhāra art before the Tang (618–907), Gupta art during the Tang, and Pāla-Himalayan art during the Yuan. Arniko is the figure representing the third wave. The artworks from his institutions, stupas, and the two Yuan portraits from his hand demonstrate that by drawing inspiration from the artistic traditions of Pāla, Nepal, and China. After the collapse of Mongol rule in China, Arniko's artistic legacy and innovation continued to influence Buddhist art at the Ming and Qing courts.

The Nepalese government, in recognition of his achievements, had issued postal stamps in his name to honor him. The Araniko Highway in Nepal is also named after him.

== Cultural references ==
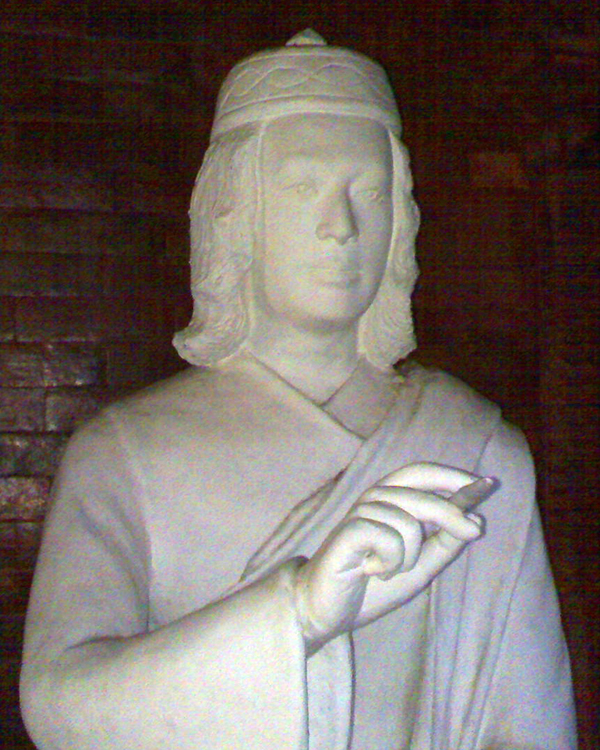
Statue of Araniko at Nepal Bhasa Academy, Kirtipur

- Araniko Highway in Nepal.
- In 1984, Satya Mohan Joshi wrote a book-length poem in Nepal Bhasa entitled "Nepal-ya Rastriye Bibhuti Kalakar Arniko-ya Sweta Chaitya," published by Nepal Bhasa Parishad.
- In 2008, Anu Raj Joshi translated Satya Mohan Joshi's book on Arniko into English with the new title "The Lasting Gift", in the form of free verses.
- In 2010, in the "World Expo Park of Shanghai" at Expo 2010 Shanghai, which opened on 1 May 2010, had a "Nepal Araniko Center" in the Highlight 1 section of Nepal Pavilion. Nepal Pavilion at Expo 2010 Shanghai, which opened on 1 May 2010, has been visited by a record 750,000 visitors. The number of average visitors per day was 25,000 and the number of visitors was more than 40,000 on weekends and holidays. Leading Chinese language online news site placed Nepal Pavilion within the top ten popular expo pavilions.
- A Nepali-born Swiss carpenter sought to design and manufacture handmade skateboards named after Araniko called, Arniko Skateboards. Later on, the project expanded to include skateboarding fashion.
- A terrestrial broadcasting channel based in Kathmandu, Nepal was also named after Araniko. Affectionately dubbed as Araniko Television, the segway intro features a white stupa.
- Araniko Statue in China: A reference to the white stupa that Araniko and the artisans built in Tibet under the guidance of Phags-pa.
