= Jayabhimadeva =

13th-century King of Kathmandu Valley

King of Nepal
- Reign: January 1258 – April 1271
- Predecessor: Jayadeva Malla
- Successor: Jayasimha Malla
- Died: Nepal
- Issue: Jayadityadeva; Jayanandadeva

Jayabhimadeva (Newar: 𑐖𑐫𑐨𑐶𑐩𑐡𑐾𑐰) was the fourth king of Nepal after Arideva Malla, in which period the Malla dynasty was prominent. He succeeded Jayadeva Malla and reigned from 1258 to 1271.

== Early life ==
Jayabhimadeva, while not belonging to the Malla dynasty, was closely related with the same. He was a local lord in Banepa (then called Bhonta) and had gained political power during the reigns of Abhaya Malla, and Jayadeva Malla. He, along with Jayasimha Malla of Bhadgaon, controlled much of the area in the valley and had greatly reduced the powers of the presiding monarch.

=== Conflicts ===
In 1256, Jayabhimadeva recovered a village called Nipikvath. In the same year, he entered the state treasury and looted it with the help of the House of Tripura, and the officials of Patan. During a revolt, he was expelled from the kingdom but he seems to not have followed the royal orders.

== Reign ==
Jayadeva Malla, the last king from the lineage of Aridev Malla, died in 1258. Following his death, Jayabhimadeva and Jayasimha Malla of Tripura House met at Palanchok and came to an agreement to alternate the throne. Jaybhimadeva then started to rule Nepal. The details of his reign are not very well known. He was succeeded by Jayasimha Malla in 1271 following the prior agreement.

Preceded by Jayadeva Malla	King of Nepal; 1258–1271	Succeeded by Jayasimha Malla
