= Kathmandu View Tower =

Tallest building in Nepal

- Location of Kathmandu View Tower Kathmandu View Tower (Nepal)

General information
- Status: 2023 (almost finished, currently under construction)
- Location: Kathmandu, Nepal
- Coordinates: 27.70400787000275°N 85.31742863070257°E
- Inaugurated: 11 November 2015

Height
- Height: 130 Meters (426ft)

Kathmandu View Tower (Nepali: काठमाडौं भ्यू टावर) is a building, currently under construction, in Kathmandu, Nepal. It is planned to be Nepal's tallest building at 130 Meters (426ft) with 29 stories.

It was inaugurated by Nepal's Vice-president Nanda Bahadur Pun on 11 November 2015. Construction on Kathmandu View Tower commenced on 14 August 2016.

In November 2022, it was reported that the building was limited to be 12-storey to satisfy safety regulations. This is due to frequent earthquakes in Nepal.

In 2023, it was reported that only 30 percent of work on the building had been completed as it was topped out.
