= Miaoying Temple =

Tibetan Buddhist temple in Beijing, China

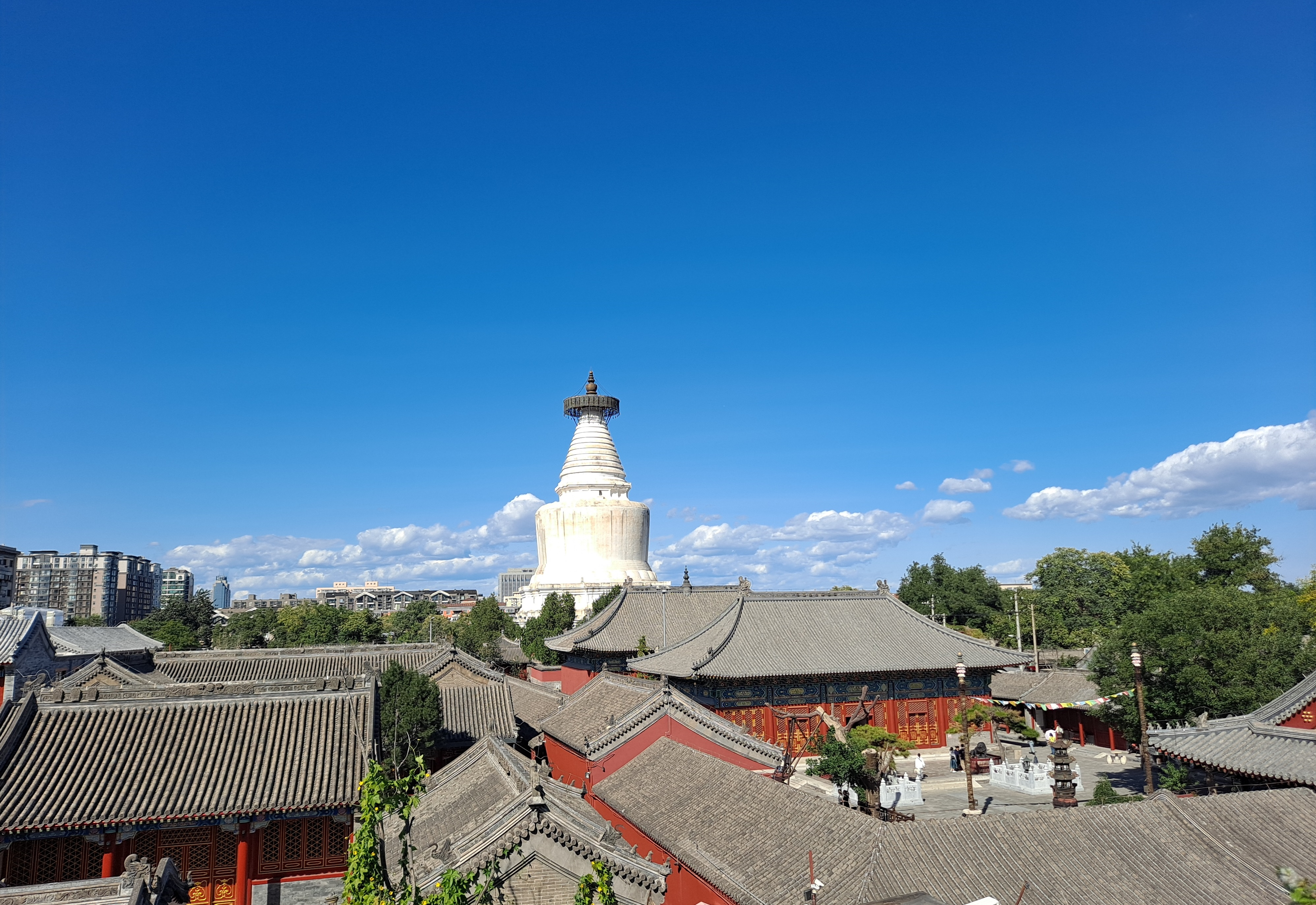

Religion
- Affiliation: Buddhism

Location
- Location: Beijing
- Country: China
- Interactive map of Miaoying Temple
- Coordinates: 39.924°N 116.357°E

Architecture
- Completed: 1279

The Miaoying Temple (simplified Chinese: 妙应寺; traditional Chinese: 妙應寺; pinyin: Miàoyìng Sì), also known as the "White Stupa Temple" (Chinese: 白塔寺; pinyin: Báitǎ Sì), is a Chinese Buddhist temple on the north side of Fuchengmennei Street in the Xicheng District of Beijing. The temple was a monastery of the Sakya school of Tibetan Buddhism and is now open to the public as a museum. The temple's White Pagoda was built 1279 in the Yuan Dynasty and is the oldest and largest Tibetan Buddhist pagoda in China.

== History ==
=== Yuan Dynasty ===
The temple's pagoda was built on the site of a previous pagoda of Yong'an temple in the Liao Dynasty (916–1125).

The temple was built in 1279 under the orders of Emperor Kublai Khan and was originally named "Dashengshou Wan'an Temple". The White Pagoda built in the Yuan Dynasty is the oldest and largest Tibetan Buddhist pagoda in China. In 1961, "Miaoying Temple White Pagoda" was announced by the State Council of the People's Republic of China as one of the first batch of national key cultural relics protection units. Arniko impressed Kublai Khan (Genghis Khan’s grandson) by repairing a bronze statue, and went on to build the White Pagoda.

=== Ming and Qing Dynasties ===
There were temples built on the sites since the Liao and Yuan dynasties. The temple's famous white stupa also dates to the Yuan Dynasty to house a relic of the Buddha. However, the present-building dates to the Ming dynasty as well as its given name, "Miaoying Si", meaning "Temple of Marvellous Response".

=== People's Republic of China ===
In 1961, then Chinese Premier Zhou Enlai signed a Proclamation stating that the Temple was to be protected as a National Treasure. This Proclamation kept the White Stupa safe during the Cultural Revolution of the 1960s.

In 1976, the temple was seriously damaged by the Tangshan earthquake. The top of the stupa tilted to one side, the bricks and mortar supporting the stupa crumbled, and many relics were broken.

In 1978, the Beijing Department of Cultural Relics undertook the task of repairing and renovating the temple. The courtyards, the four corner-pavilions, the Hall of the Buddhas of the Three Ages, the Hall of the Heavenly Kings (Tianwang dian) in front of the stupa, the Hall of the Seven Buddhas and the stupa itself were repaired and renovated.

The complex was again renovated in 2010.

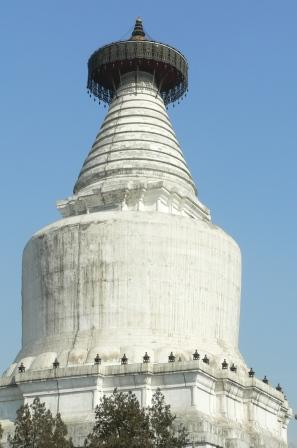
The White Pagoda

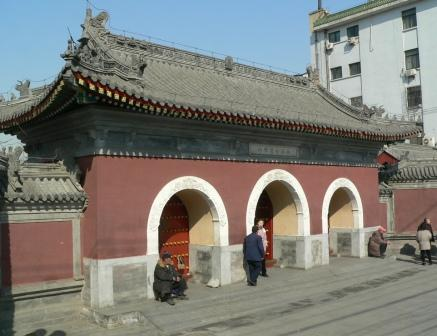
The gate of the temple

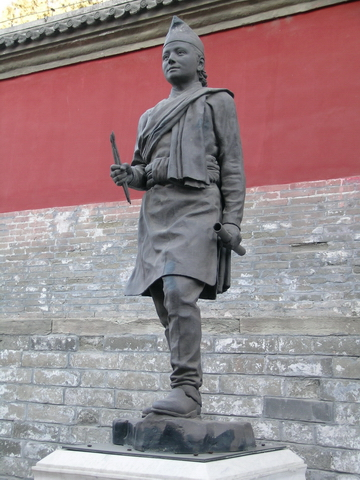
Statue of the Nepali architect, Araniko, who helped construct the temple's Pagoda

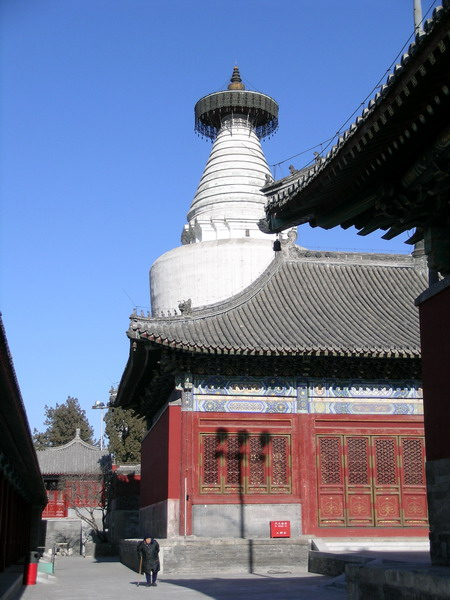
From the sideview

== See also ==
- History of Beijing
- Beihai Park, the location of another famous White Dagoba in Beijing
