= Malla dynasty (Nepal) =

1201–1769 ruling dynasty of the Kathmandu Valley

Malla Confederacy 𑐩𑐮𑑂𑐮 𑐰𑑄𑐱 Malla saṅgha
- c. 1201–25 November 1769
- Approximate location of the Malla confederacy in the 15th century as per A Historical Atlas of South Asia

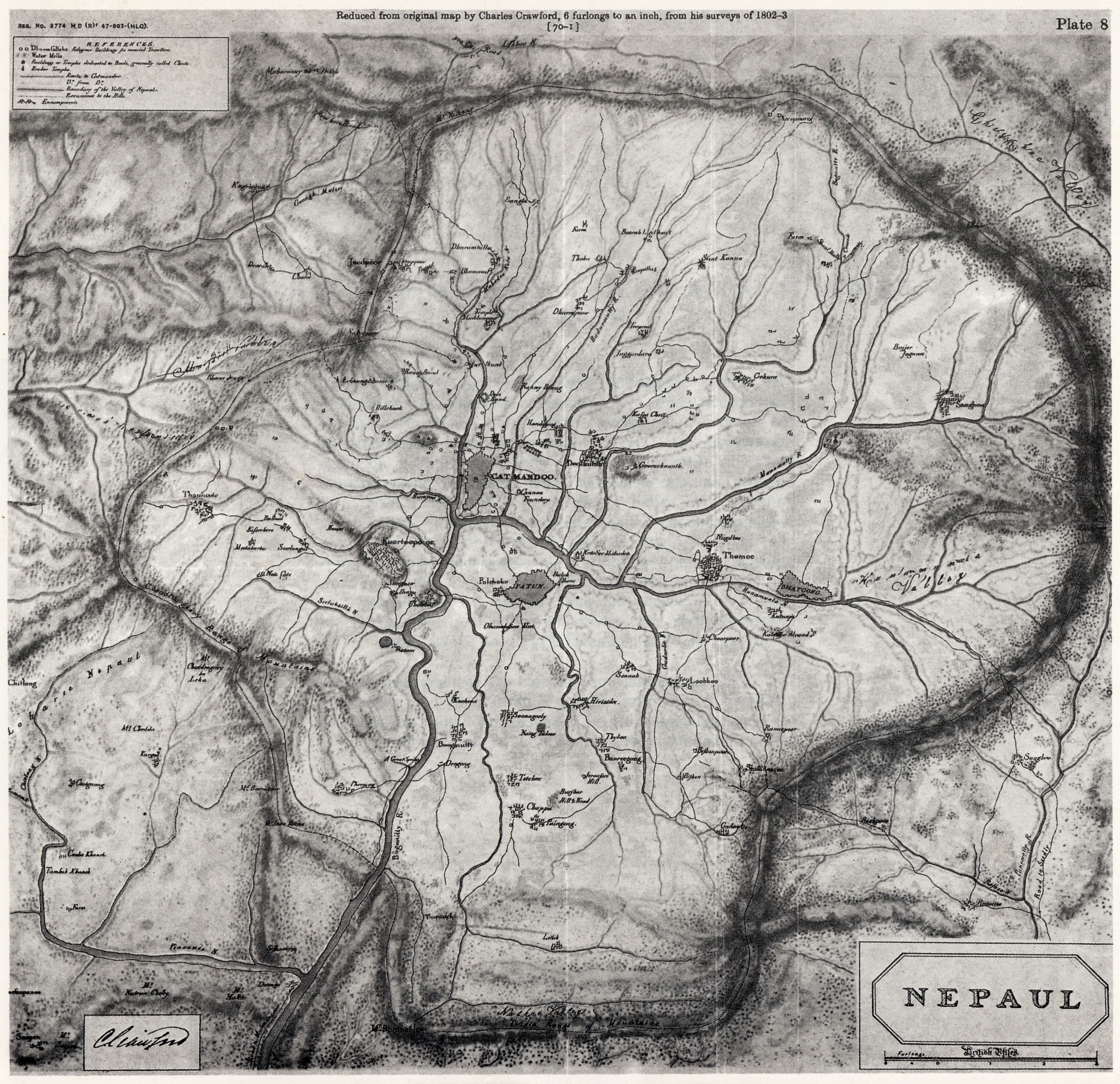
- Scan of map of Nepaul, present-day Kathmandu Valley and surrounding areas in Nepal
- Capital: Basantapur
- Largest city: Kathmandu
- Common languages: Newar (official, lingua franca, literary, and court language); Sanskrit (liturgical language); Maithili and Bengali (literary language)
- Religion: Hinduism; Buddhism
- Government: Unitary absolute monarchy
- Mahārāja
  - 1201–1216: Arideva Malla
  - 1216–1255: Abhaya Malla
  - 1255-1258: Jayadeva Malla
  - 1258–1271: Jayabhimadeva
  - 1258–1271: Jayasimha Malla
  - 1274–1308: Ananta Malla
  - 1313–1320: Jayanandadeva
  - 1320–1344: Jayari Malla
  - 1348–1361: Jayarajadeva
  - 1360–1381: Jayarjunadeva
  - 1382–1395: Jayasthiti Malla
  - 1395–1408: Jayadharma Malla
  - 1408–1428: Jayajyotir Malla
  - 1428–1482: Jayayakshya Malla
- Legislature: None (rule by decree)
- Historical era: Medieval Nepal
  - Established: c. 1201
  - Disestablished: 25 November 1769
- Currency: Mohar
| Preceded by | Succeeded by |
| Thakuri dynasty | Kingdom of Nepal |
- Today part of: Nepal

The Malla dynasty (Newar: 𑐩𑐮𑑂𑐮 𑐰𑑄𑐱; Malla vaṃśa) also known as the Malla Confederacy, was the ruling dynasty of Nepal Mandala which consists of the Kathmandu Valley and its surrounding region in modern-day Nepal from 1201 to 1769. This dynasty was founded by Arideva Malla. Though the latter Mallas were regarded as belonging to the Raghuvamsha dynasty, they were also seen as continuations and descendants of the Licchavi dynasty. Later Malla kings, particularly those of Bhaktapur starting from Jagajjyoti Malla also traced one section of their lineage from Nanyadeva, the founder of the Karnat dynasty of Mithila. The term Malla means wrestler in Sanskrit. The first use of the word Malla in the Kathmandu Valley began in 1201.

The Malla period stretched over 600 years, as they presided over and flourished the Newar civilization of Nepal Mandala which developed as one of the most sophisticated urban civilisations in the Himalayan foothills and a key destination on the India-Tibet trade route. During the Malla Dynasty, Nepal Bhasa was the official language, while Maithili and Bengali also held significant importance as literary languages during this period.

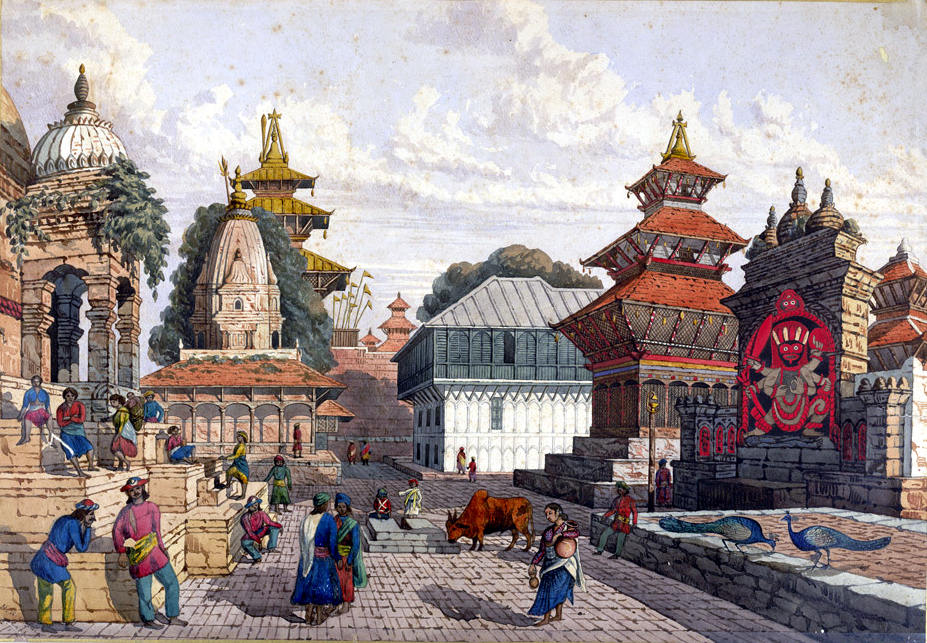
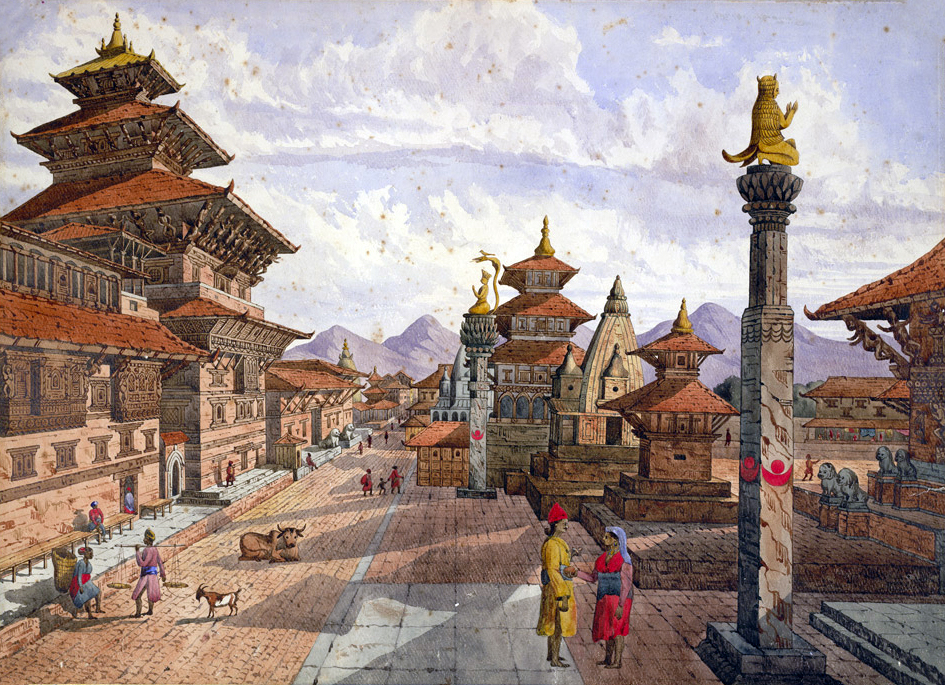
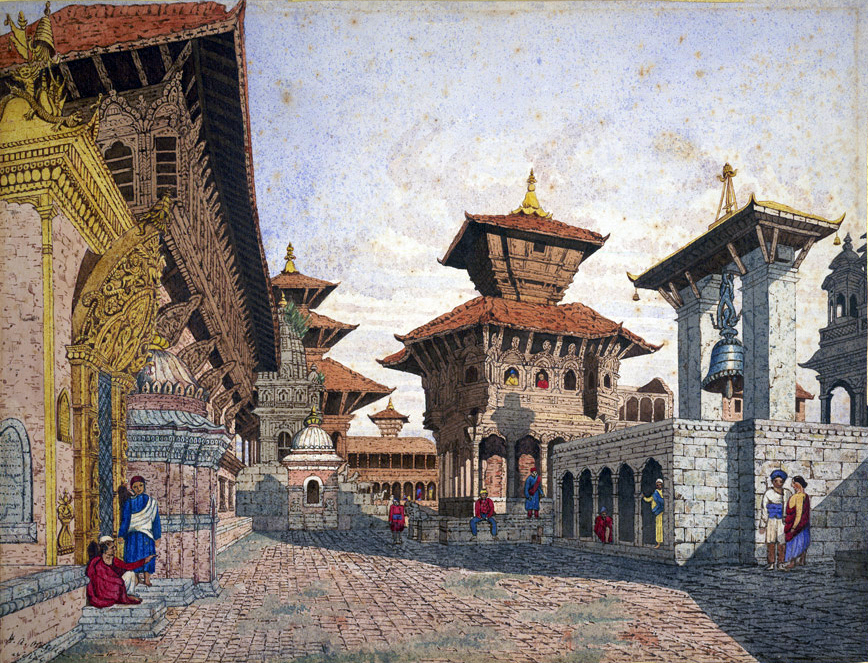
Clockwise from top-left: (a) Kathmandu Durbar Square, the Royal palace of Malla King of Kantipur (b) Patan Durbar Square, the Royal palace of Malla King of Patan(c) Bhaktapur Durbar Square, the Royal palace of Malla King of Bhaktapur, as they all looked during 1850s.

== Origin ==
Beginning in the early twelfth century, leading notables in Nepal began to appear with names ending in the term malla, ("wrestler" in Sanskrit), indicating a person of great strength and power. Arimalla (reigned 1200–16) was the first king to be so-called, and the practice of adopting such a name was followed regularly by rulers in Nepal until the eighteenth century. The names of the Malla kings were also written as, for example, Ari Malla. Another legend says that Arimalla was fond of wrestling and he added malla to his name. However, this is debated as the word malla appears frequently in the historical records before the Malla dynasty. Another possibility is that Aridev adopted the title Malla because it was popular at the time in India. It seems more convincing because Aridev belonged to the dynasty started by Vamadeva, and none of his predecessors used Malla in their names. If such is the case, it makes the Malla dynasty separate from the Malla community which originated in India.

The later Malla kings, especially from Bhaktapur and starting with Jagajjyoti Malla (r. 1614–1637) claimed descent from the Karnata dynasty of Mithila, a connection which is not corroborated in the early contemporary sources like the 14th century Gopal Raj Vamshavali. Scholars such as Brinkhaus have argued that this genealogical claim was a deliberate political construction, accompanied by the simultaneous adoption of Maithili as a courtly literary language in place of Bengali, serving to legitimize Malla rule by associating the dynasty with the prestigious Mithila tradition. Similarly, Maithil Brahmin, Kanyakubja Brahmin and Saraswat Brahmin priests were invited and settled in Kathmandu during the Malla rule. Similarly, dozens of Kshatriya-status noble and ruling clans of Mithila also came along as the nobility or as part of the Malla entourage who fled Muslim invasions. Most notable of these frequent migrations was the migration that occurred after the attack of the Mithila kingdom by Ghiyath al-Din Tughluq during the reign of King Harisimhadeva in 1324 CE, which led to large-scale migration of Mithila to Nepal. The priestly classes that came during this time are the ancestors of present-day Rajopadhyaya and Maithil Brahmins of the Valley, whereas the immigrant warrior and noble classes are the ancestors of today's Chatharīya Srēṣṭha Newars. Other groups too immigrated and eventually assimilated into the Newar society, some of which are the present-day Khadgis (Nāya/Shahi), Dhobi, Kapalis/Jogis, Halwai/(Rajkarnikar) and Tamrakar of Lalitpur, Podya (Chamahar), Kulu (Dusadh), among others. These people eventually became endogamous caste units that started to be identified as Newar from the 16th century onward. The backbone of the Malla army, particularly under Jaya Prakash Malla, was made up of Tirhutia soldiers from Northern Bihar and parts of the Terai. The military leaders and chiefs were often recruited from the Kshatriya families of the time, marked by their clan titles like Pradhan or Pradhananga or Pradhan Patravamshi (chief ministers), Amatya (ministers), Rawal, etc.

== History ==
=== Early Malla period ===
The long Malla period witnessed the continued importance of the Kathmandu Valley as a political, cultural, and economic centre of Nepal. Other areas also began to emerge as significant centres in their own right, increasingly connected to the Kathmandu Valley.

The time of the earlier Malla kings was not one of consolidation but was instead a period of upheaval in and around Nepal. In the twelfth century, Muslim Turks set up a powerful kingdom in India at Delhi, and in the thirteenth century, Turko Afghan khaljis expanded their control over most of northern India. During this process, all of the regional kingdoms in India underwent a major reshuffling and considerable fighting before they eventually fell under Delhi's control. This process resulted in an increasing militarization of Nepal's neighbours and sections of Nepal as well. For example, in western Nepal, around Dullu in the Jumla Valley, an alternative seat of political and military power grew up around a separate dynasty of Mallas (who were not related to the Mallas of the Kathmandu Valley), who reigned until the fourteenth century. These Khas kings expanded into parts of western Tibet and sent raiding expeditions into the Kathmandu Valley between 1275 and 1335. In 1312 the Khas king, Ripumalla, visited Lumbini and had his inscription carved on Ashoka's pillar. He then entered the Kathmandu Valley to worship publicly at Matsyendranath, Pashupatinath, and Swayambhunath. These acts were all public announcements of his overlordship in Nepal and signified the temporary breakdown of royal power within the valley. The first Malla rulers had to cope with several disasters. In 1255, one-third of the population of Kathmandu (30,000 people, including King Abhaya Malla) was killed when the valley suffered an earthquake with the epicentre right below the city. A devastating Muslim invasion by the Sultan of Bengal Shamsuddin Ilyas Shah in 1345–46, during the reign of Jayaraja Deva (r. 1347–1361), left plundered Hindu and Buddhist shrines in its wake. The invasion, however, did not leave a lasting cultural effect. In India, the damage was more widespread and many Hindus were driven into the hills and mountains of Nepal, where they established small Rajbanshi principalities. None of the existing buildings in the valley proper dates from before this raid. He is said to have destroyed the Lichchhavi palaces of Managriha and Kailashkuta. He also damaged all the temples in the Kathmandu valley except the Changu Narayan Temple, which he could not locate as it lies some hills away from Kathmandu. He returned after 3 days of looting and burning.

Apart from this, the earlier Malla years (1220–1482) were largely stable. During the reign of Jayabhimdev Malla in 1260, eighty artisans were sent to Tibet. Among them was Araniko (1245–1306) who later rose to become a high-ranking official in the court of Mongol leader Kublai Khan's Yuan dynasty. Araniko is the only person from this early Malla era whose biography is known due to Chinese historical records.

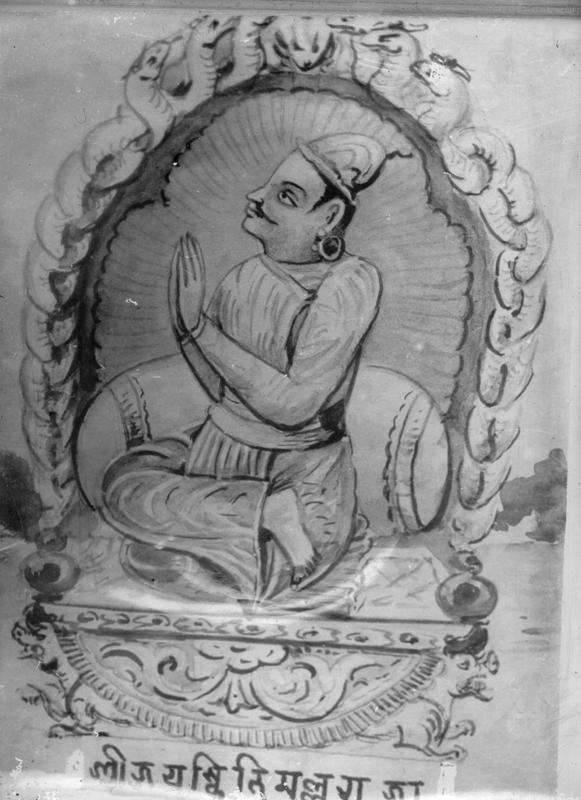
Portrait of Jayasthiti Malla (r. 1382–1395)

This period reached a high point under the third Malla dynasty of Jayasthiti Malla (r. 1382–1395), who united the valley and codified its laws, including the caste system. The early Malla period, a time of continuing trade and the reintroduction of Nepalese coinage saw the steady growth of the small towns that became Kathmandu, Patan, and Bhadgaon. Royal pretenders in Patan and Bhadgaon struggled with their main rivals, the lords of Banepa in the East, relying on the populations of their towns as their power bases. The citizens of Bhadgaon viewed Devaladevi as the legitimate, independent queen. The betrothal in 1354 of her granddaughter to Jayasthiti Malla, a man of obscure but high birth, eventually led to the reunification of the land and a lessening of strife among the towns. By 1370 Jayasthiti Malla controlled Patan, and in 1374 his forces defeated those in Banepa and Pharping. He then took full control of the country from 1382 until 1395, reigning in Bhadgaon as the husband of the queen and in Patan with full regal titles. His authority was not absolute because the lords of Banepa were able to pass themselves off as kings to ambassadors of the Chinese Ming emperor who travelled to Nepal during this time. He united the entire valley and its environs under his sole rule. The first comprehensive codification of law in Nepal, based on the dharma of ancient religious textbooks, is ascribed to Jayasthiti Malla. This legendary compilation of traditions was seen as the source of legal reforms during the nineteenth and twentieth centuries.

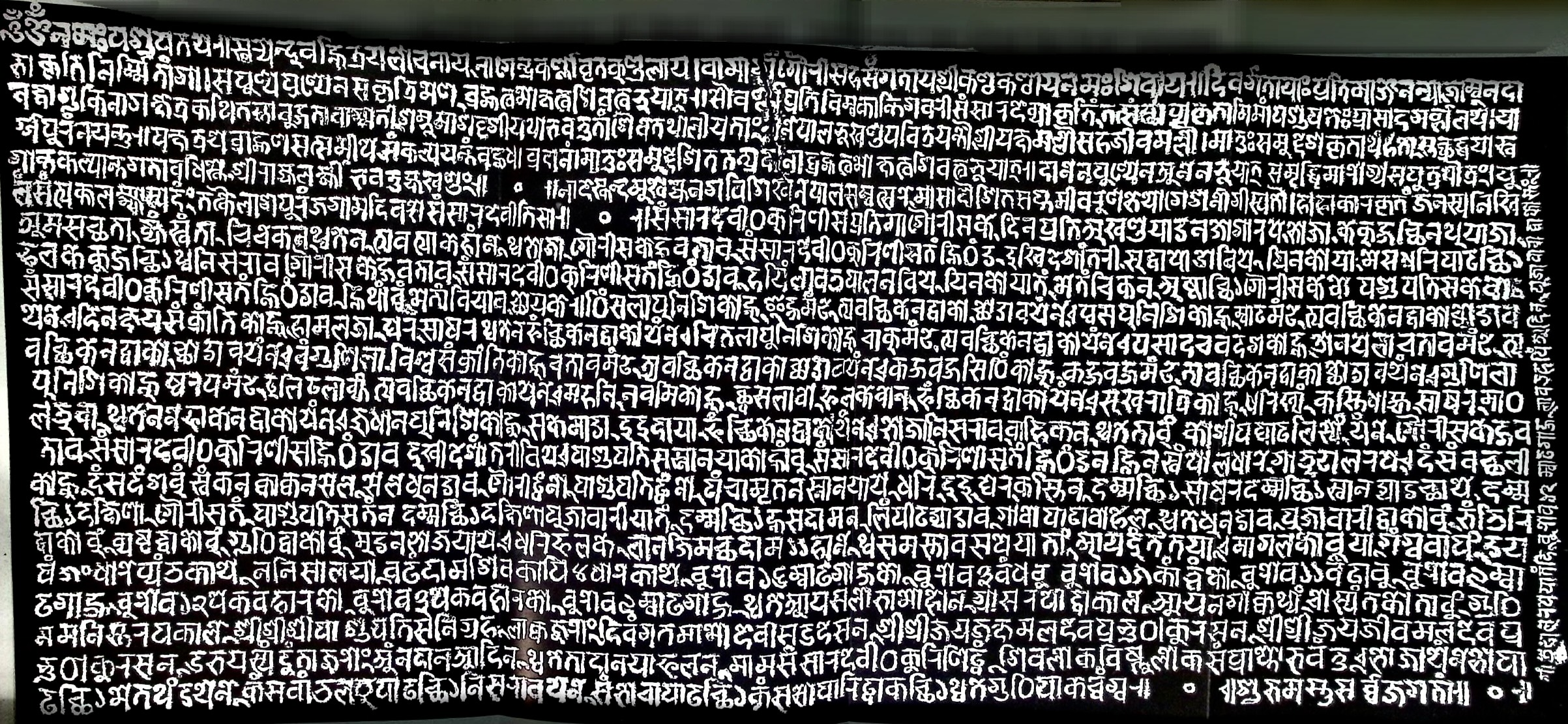
King Yaksha Malla’s copperplate inscription, Newar language, 1446 CE.

After the death of Jayasthiti Malla, his sons divided the kingdom and ruled collegially, until Jayajyotir Malla, the last surviving son, ruled on his own from 1408 to 1428. His son, Yaksha Malla (reigned ca. 1428–82), represented the high point of the Mallas as rulers of a united Nepal. Under his rule, a military raid was launched against the plains to the south, a very rare event in Nepalese history. Yaksha Malla built the Mul Chok in 1455, which remains the oldest palace section in Bhadgaon. The struggles among the landed aristocracy and leading town families (Pradhans), especially acute in Patan, were controlled during his reign. Outlying areas such as Banepa and Pharping were semi-independent but acknowledged the leadership of the king. Newari appeared more often as the language of choice in official documents. The royal family began to accept Manesvari (also known as Taleju Maju), a manifestation of Shiva's consort, as their deity.

After the death of Jayasthiti Malla's grandson Yaksha Malla in 1482, the Kathmandu Valley was divided up among his sons into three kingdoms of Bhaktapur (Khwopa), Kantipur (Yen) and Lalitpur (Yala). The rest of the region consisted of a fragmented patchwork of almost 50 independent states, stretching from Palpa and Jumla in the west to the semi-independent states of Banepa and Pharping, most of them minting their own coins and maintaining standing armies. The most notable Malla kings of this later era were: Pratap Malla of Kantipur, Siddhi Narasimha Malla of Lalitpur, and Bhupatindra Malla of Bhaktapur.

=== Period of three kingdoms ===
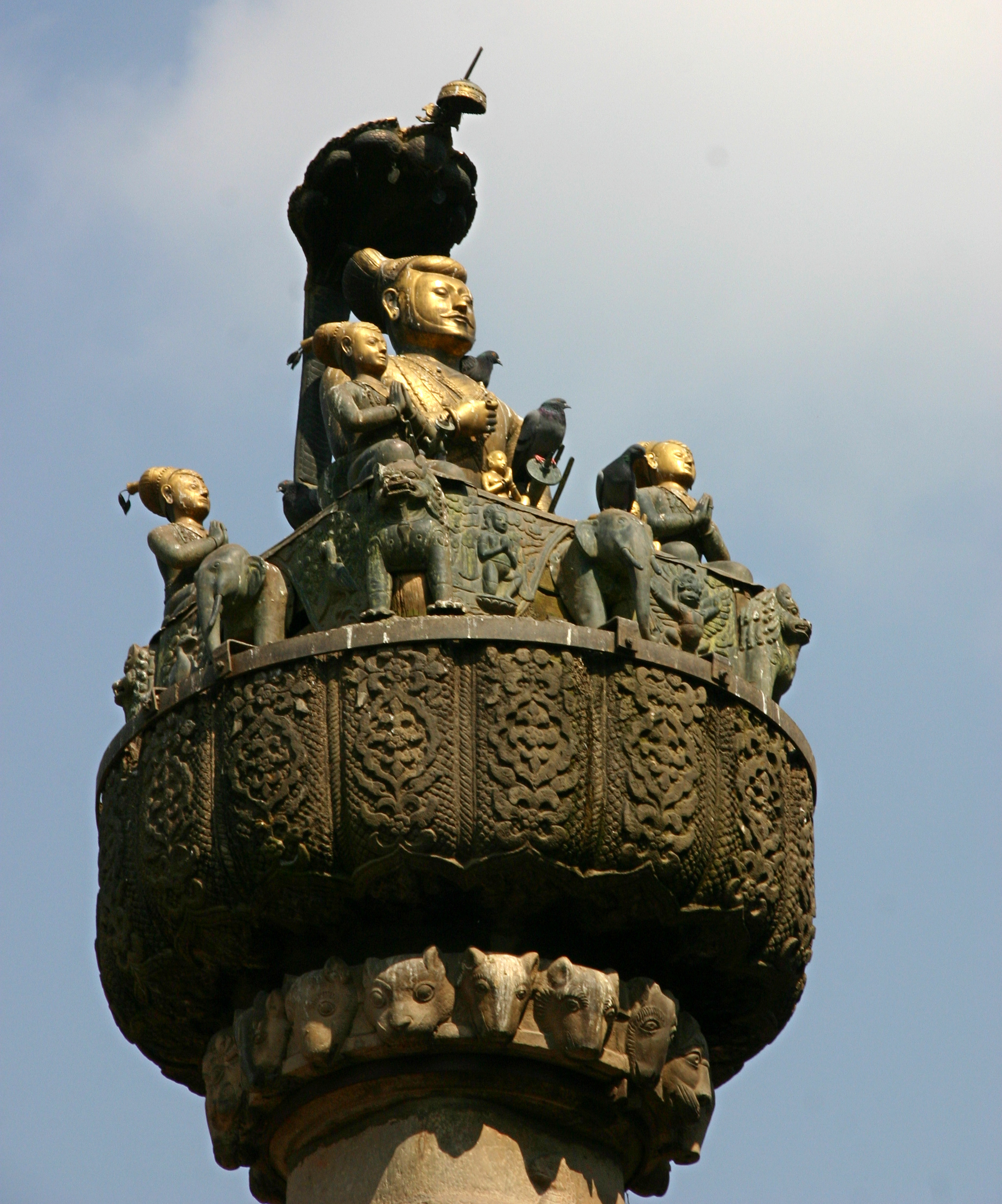
King Pratap Malla of Kantipur

King Yoganarendra Malla of Lalitpur

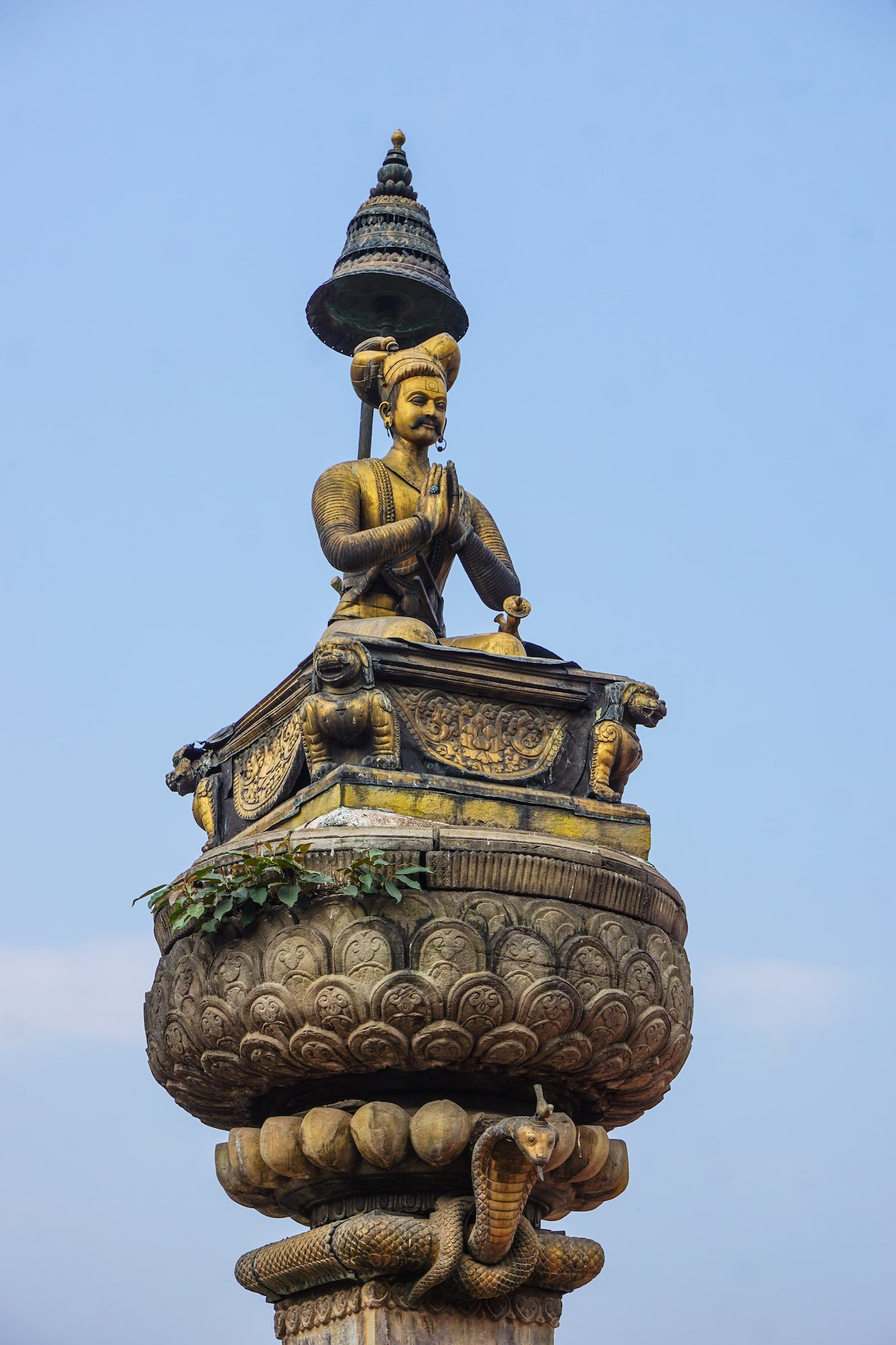
King Bhupatindra Malla of Bhaktapur

After 1482, a crucial date in Nepalese history, the kingdom was divided. At first, the six sons of Yaksha Malla attempted to reign collegially, in their grandfathers' pattern. Ratna Malla was the first to rebel against this system of joint rule, seizing Kathmandu in 1484 and ruling there alone until he died in 1520. Rayamalla, the eldest brother, ruled Bhadgaon with the other brothers until his death when the crown there passed into the hands of his descendants. Banepa broke away under Rama Malla until its reincorporation into the Bhadgaon kingdom in 1649. Patan remained aloof, dominated by factions of its local nobility, until Sivasimha Malla, a descendant of Ratna Malla, conquered it in 1597 and united it with Kathmandu. On his death, however, Kathmandu and Patan were given to different grandsons and again separated. The centre of Nepal thus remained split into three competing kingdoms, roughly based on Bhadgaon, Kathmandu, and Patan. The influence of these petty kingdoms outside the valley varied over time. Bhadgaon extended its feeble power as far as the Dudh Kosi in the east, Kathmandu-controlled areas to the north and as far west as Nuwakot, and Patan included territories to the south as far as Makwanpur. The relationships among the kingdoms within the valley became quite convoluted. Although all three ruling houses were related and periodically intermarried, their squabbles over minuscule territorial gains or ritual slights repeatedly led to warfare. The kings attended coronation rituals or marriages at each other's capitals and then plotted the downfalls of their relatives.

The period of the three kingdoms—the time of the later Mallas—lasted until the mid-eighteenth century. The complete flowering of the unique culture of the Kathmandu Valley occurred during this period, and it was also during this time that the old palace complexes in the three main towns achieved much of their present-day forms. The Kings still based their legitimate rule on their role as protectors of dharma, and often they were devout donors to religious shrines. Kings built many of the older temples in the valley, gems of late medieval art and architecture, during this late Malla period. Buddhism remained a vital force for much of the population, especially in its old seat of Patan. Religious endowments called Guthi arranged for long-term support of traditional forms of worship or ritual by allowing temple or vihara lands to be passed down through generations of the same families; this support resulted in the preservation of conservative art, architecture, and religious literature that had disappeared in other areas of South Asia. Newari was in regular use as a literary and court language by the fourteenth century and was the lingua franca of the Nepal Mandala. Maithili, the language of the Tirhut area to the south, became a court language during the seventeenth century and still was spoken by many people in the Terai in the late twentieth century. In the west, Khas language, or the language of the Khasa, was slowly expanding, only later to evolve into present-day Nepali.

The final centuries of Mallas' rule were a time of great political change outside the Kathmandu Valley. In India, overlordship in Delhi fell to the powerful Mughal dynasty (1526–1858). Although the Mughals never exercised direct lordship over Nepal, their empire had a major indirect impact on its institutional life. During the sixteenth century, when the Mughals were spreading their rule over almost all of South Asia, many dispossessed princes from the plains of northern India found shelter in the hills to the north. Legends indicated that many small principalities in western Nepal originated in migration and conquest by exiled warriors, who added to the slow spread of the Khasa language and culture in the West. Along with these exiles came Mughal military technology, including firearms and artillery, and administrative techniques based on land grants in return for military service. The influence of the Mughals is reflected in the weapons and dress of Malla rulers in contemporary paintings and in the adoption of Persian terminology for administrative offices and procedures throughout Nepal.

Meanwhile, in Tibet, domestic struggles during the 1720s led to decisive intervention by the powerful Qing rulers of China (1644–1911). A Chinese force installed the 6th Dalai Lama (the highest-ranking Tibetan religious leader) in Lhasa in 1728, and thereafter the Chinese stationed military governors (amban) in Lhasa to monitor local events. In 1729 representatives of the three Nepalese kingdoms sent greetings and presents to the Chinese emperor in Beijing, after which the Qing viewed Nepal as an outlying tributary kingdom (a perception not shared within Nepal). The expansion of big empires in both the north and south thus took place during a time when Nepal was experiencing considerable weakness in its traditional center. The three kingdoms lived a charmed life—isolated, independent, and quarrelling in their mountain valley—as the systems around them became larger and more centralized.

By the seventeenth century, the mountain areas to the north of the valley and the Kiranti region to the east were the only areas that maintained traditional tribal communal systems, influenced to various degrees by Hindu ideas and practices. In the west and the south of the three kingdoms, there were many petty states ruled by dynasties of a warrior (Kshatriya) status, many claiming an origin among princely, or Rajput, dynasties to the south. In the near west, around the Narayani River system (the Narayani was one of the seven Gandak rivers), there was a loose confederation of principalities called the Chaubisi (the Twenty-four), including Makwanpur and Palpa. In the far west, around the Karnali River system, there was a separate confederation called the Baisi (the Twenty-two), headed by the Raja of Jumla. The confederations were in constant conflict, and their member states were constantly quarrelling with each other. The kingdoms of Kathmandu, Patan, and Bhadgaon periodically allied themselves with princes among these confederations. All of these small, increasingly militarized states were operating individually at a higher level of centralized organization than ever before in the hills, but they were expending their resources in an almost anarchic struggle for survival. There was an awareness of the distinct culture of the Himalayan area but no real concept of Nepal as a nation.

=== Portuguese ===
The first contact between the people of Nepal and Europeans also occurred during the period of the later Mallas. In 1623 the Portuguese from Goa sent missionaries António de Andrade, João Cabral and Estêvão Cacella to visit Lhasa in 1628, after which Cabral travelled to Nepal. The mission was to find Christian kingdoms allied with the Portuguese to propagate the faith and trade. In the early stages, they thought it was the mythical kingdom of Catai. The offer of gifts also took place in other kingdoms such as the same happened in Bhutan, where military support was offered by the Portuguese against the enemy kingdoms. This gesture aimed at creating an alliance that would allow converting and creating new convents as well as expanding the Portuguese influence in Asia. In 1670 King Pratap Malla invited the Jesuits to settle in the country. The first Capuchin mission was founded in Kathmandu in 1715.

=== British ===
By 1764 the British East India Company, officially a private trading corporation with its army had obtained from a decaying Mughal Empire the right to govern all of Bengal, at that time one of the most prosperous areas in Asia. The company explored possibilities for expanding its trade or authority into Nepal, Bhutan, and Tibet, where the Nepalese had their trading agencies in important settlements. The increasingly powerful company was emerging as a wild card that could, in theory, be played by one or more of the kingdoms in Nepal during local struggles, potentially opening the entire Himalayan region to British penetration.

=== End ===
The Malla dynasty ruled the Kathmandu Valley until Prithvi Narayan Shah of the Gorkha Kingdom invaded it in 1768-69 CE with the Battle of Kirtipur. The last Malla kings were Jaya Prakash Malla of Kantipur, Tej Narsingh Malla of Lalitpur and Ranajit Malla of Bhaktapur. Prithvi Narayan Shah and his Gokhali troops surrounded the Kathmandu Valley. In the day of Indrajatra, when there was festival going on, Prithvi Narayan Shah attacked Yen Kantipur. Jaya Prakash Malla was helpless and he went to Lalitpur to seek asylum. Tej Narasimha Malla ruled that kingdom. After some time Prithvi Narayan Shah attacked Lalitpur and Jaya Prakash Malla along with Tej Narasimha Malla fled to Bhaktapur to seek asylum. When Prithvi Narayan Shah attacked Bhaktapur, Ranajit Malla was defeated. This resulted in the victory of Prithvi Narayan Shah over Kathmandu Valley and marked the end of the Malla period. The later period of the Malla dynasty in Lalitpur involved administration by the Six Pradhans.

Newar language inscription of Jagajjyoti Malla on stone sculpture, 1631 CE

== Legacy of Malla dynasty ==
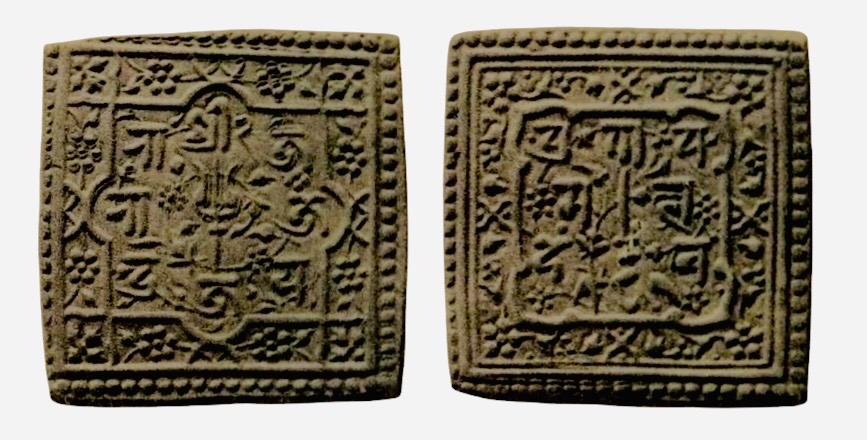
Coin of Pratap Malla with legend in the Newar script, 1661 CE (NS 781).

The rivalry between the three kingdoms of the Kathmandu Valley found its expression not only in warfare but also in the arts and culture, which flourished in the competitive climate, quite similar to that of Renaissance Italy. The outstanding collections of exquisite temples and buildings in each city's Durbar Square are a testament to the huge amounts of money spent by rulers striving to outdo each other. The building boom was financed by trade, in everything from musk and wool to salt, Chinese silk and even yak tails. The Kathmandu Valley stood at the departure point for two separate routes into Tibet, via Banepa to the northeast and via Rasuwa and the Kyirong Valley near Langtang to the northwest. Traders would cross the jungle-infested Terai during winter to avoid virulent malaria and then wait in Kathmandu for the mountain passes to open later that summer. Kathmandu grew rich and its rulers converted their wealth into gilded pagodas and ornately carved royal palaces. In the mid-17th century, Nepal gained the right to mint Tibet's coins using Tibetan silver, further enriching the kingdom's coffers.

In Kathmandu, King Pratap Malla (r. 1641–74) oversaw that city's cultural high point with the construction of the Hanuman Dhoka palace, the Rani Pokhari pond and the first of several subsequent pillars that featured a statue of the king facing the protective temples of Taleju, who the Mallas had by that time adopted as their protective deity. The mid-17th century also saw a high point of building in Patan. The Malla era shaped the religious as well as artistic landscape, introducing the dramatic chariot festivals of Indra Jatra and Matsyendranath. The Malla kings shored up their position by claiming to be reincarnations of the Hindu god Vishnu. They also worshipped Kumari, a living goddess believed to be the reincarnation of goddess Taleju. The cosmopolitan Mallas also absorbed foreign influences. The Indian Mughal court influenced Malla dress and painting, presented the Nepalese with firearms and introduced a system of land grants for military services, a system which would have a profound effect in later years. In the early 18th century, during the reign of Pratap Malla, Capuchin missionaries passed through Nepal to Tibet, and when they returned home gave the West its first description of exotic Kathmandu.

After the defeat of the Malla Kings, their surviving descendants left the valley and settled in different parts of Nepal. Their descendants have been using surnames like Malla, Raghubansi, Rajbanshi, Pradhananga and Pradhan, among others.

Architecture in Kathmandu Valley during Malla dynasty
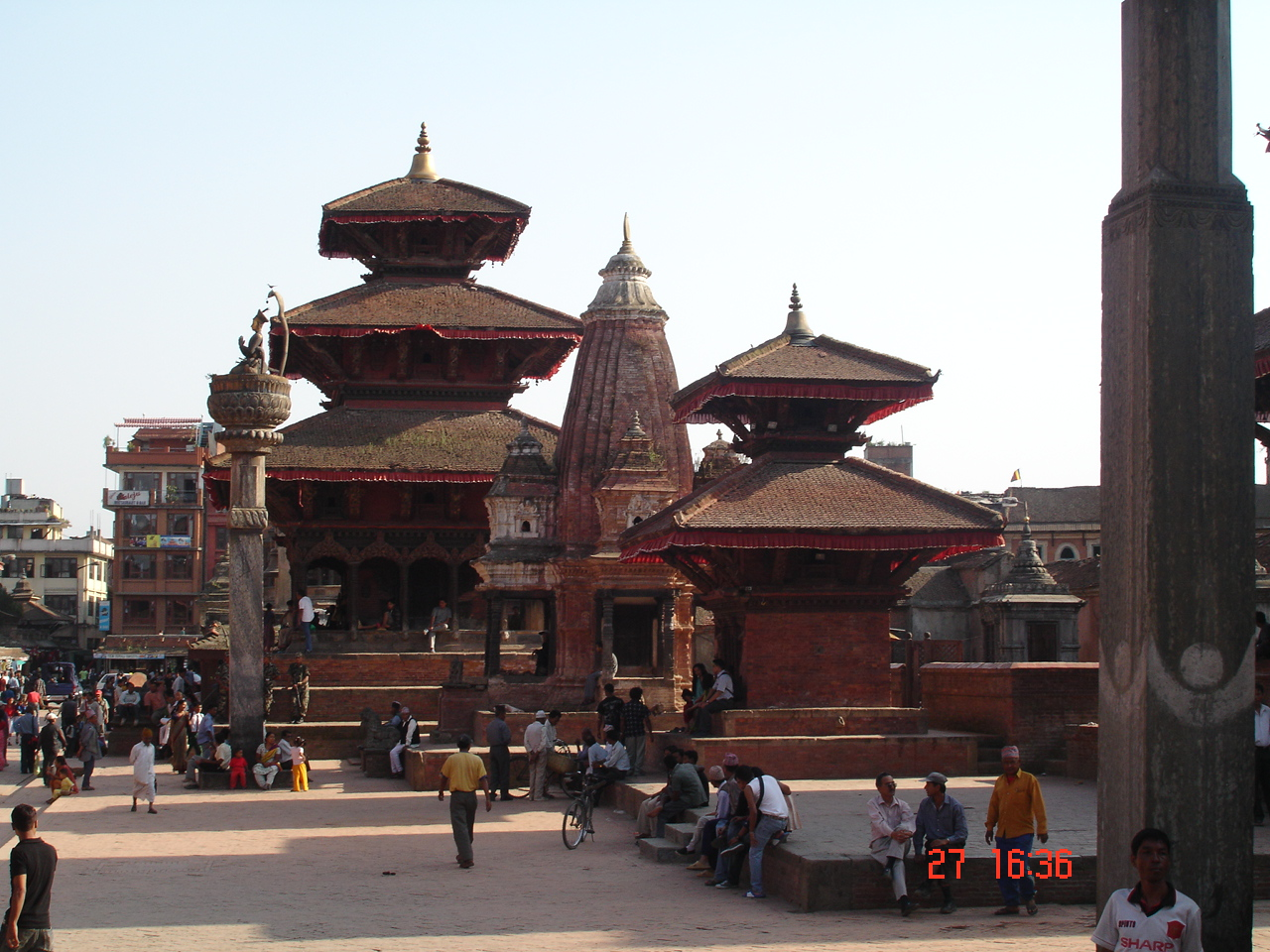
Near the palace of the Malla dynasty rulers in Lalitpur with pillar and statue of king Yoga Narendra Malla (Lalitpur).

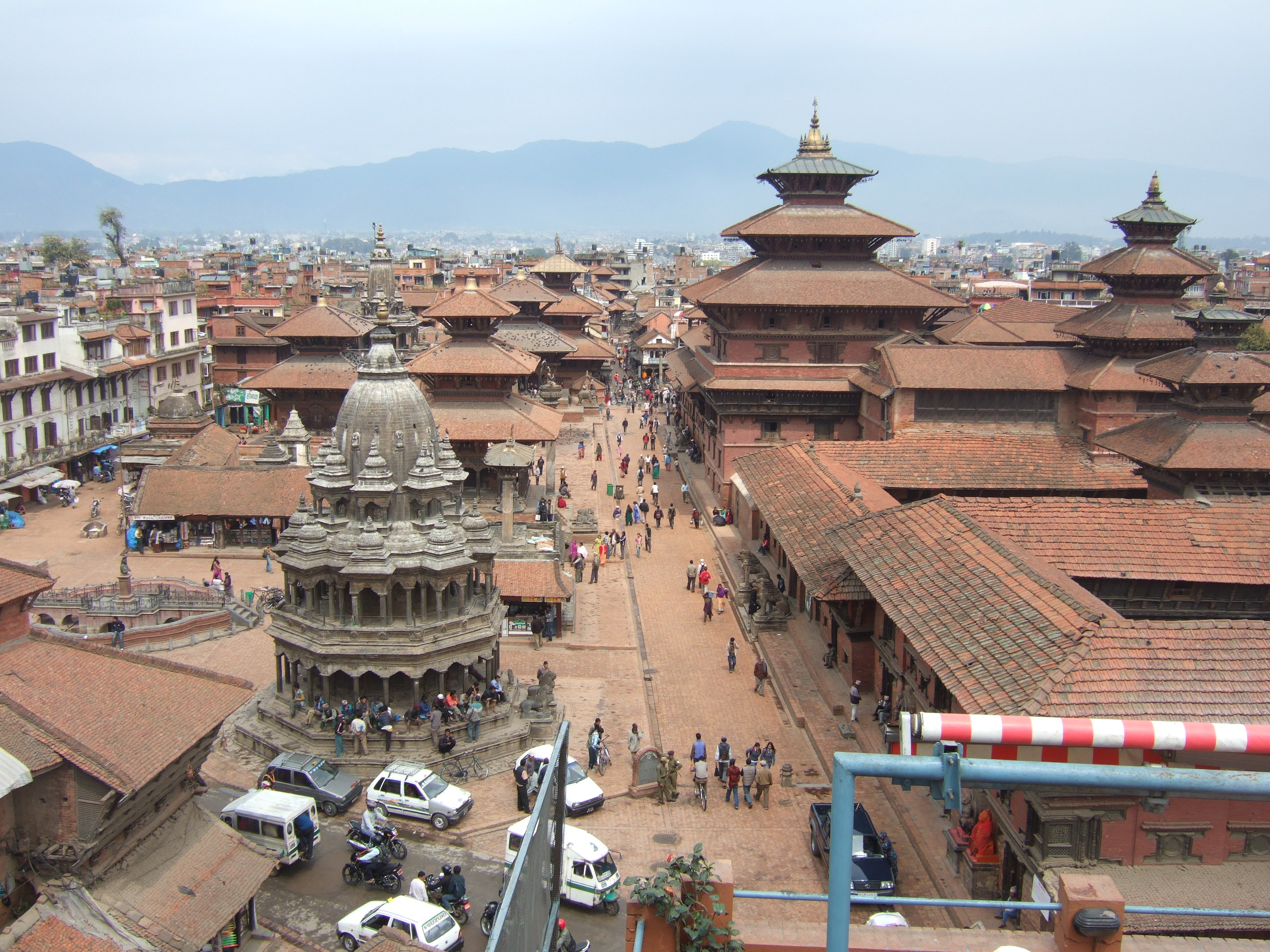
Royal Palace and Hindu temples in Patan (Lalitpur).

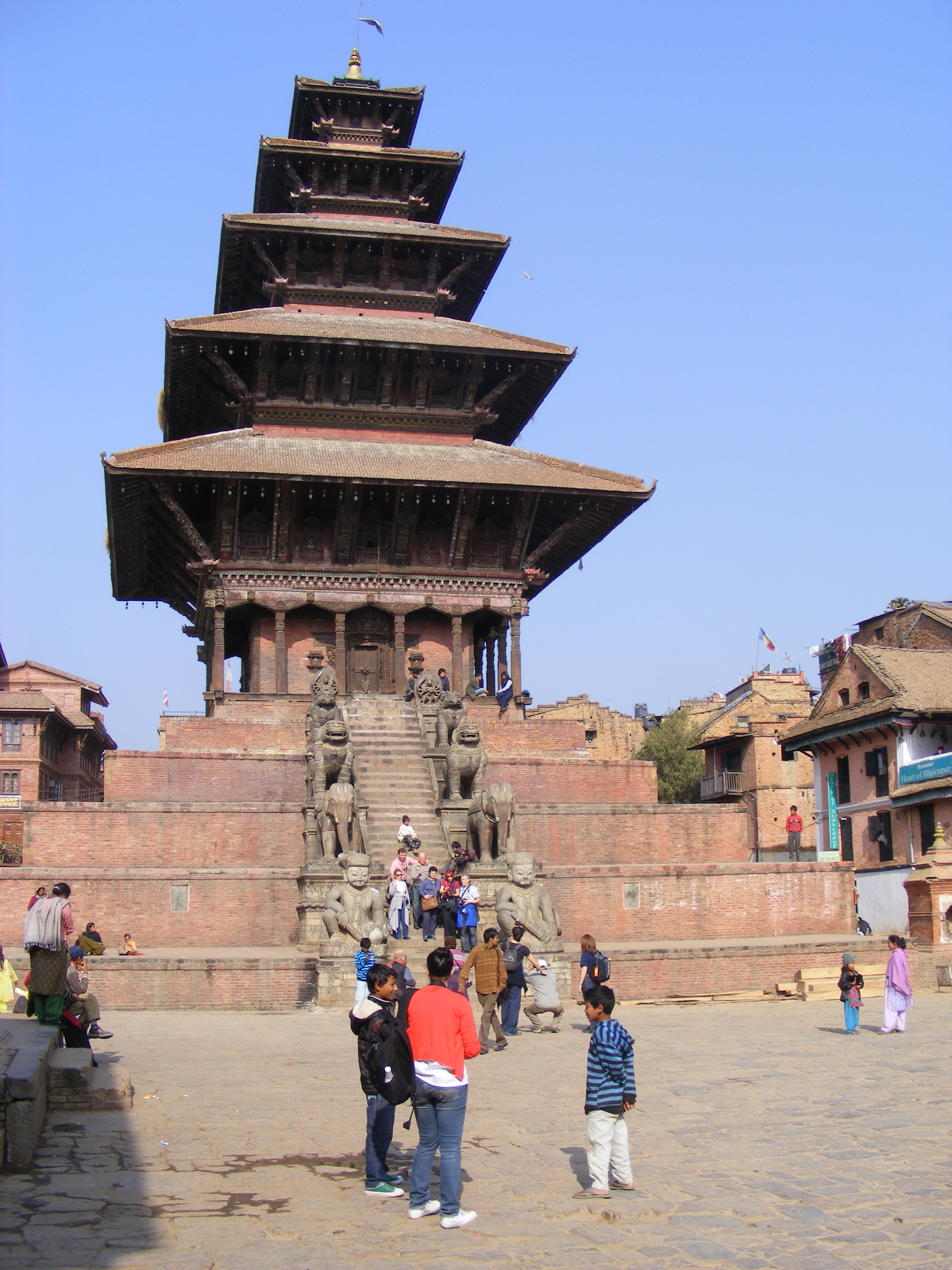
Temple of Nyatapola (Bhaktapur).

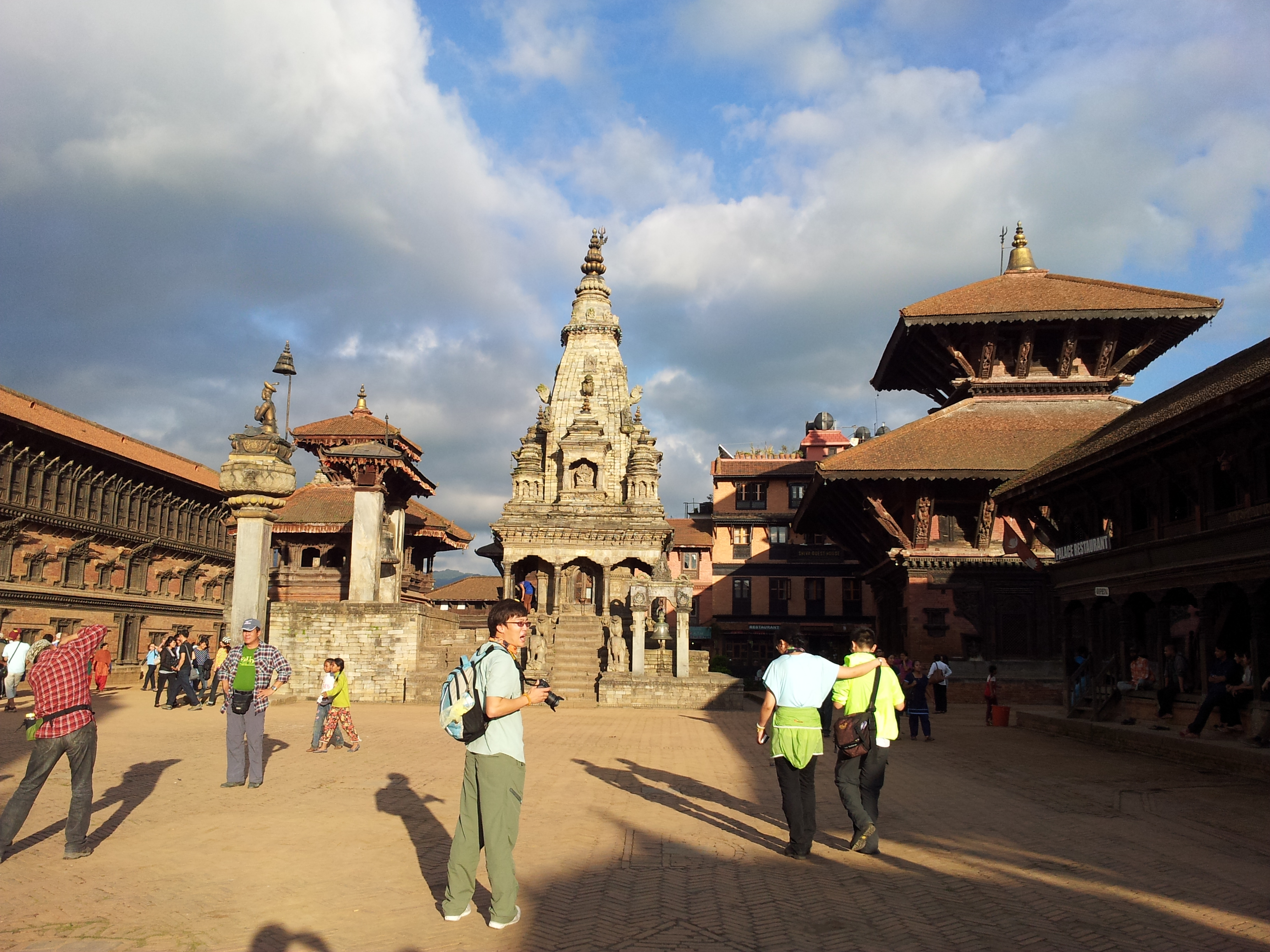
Bhaktapur Durbar Square.

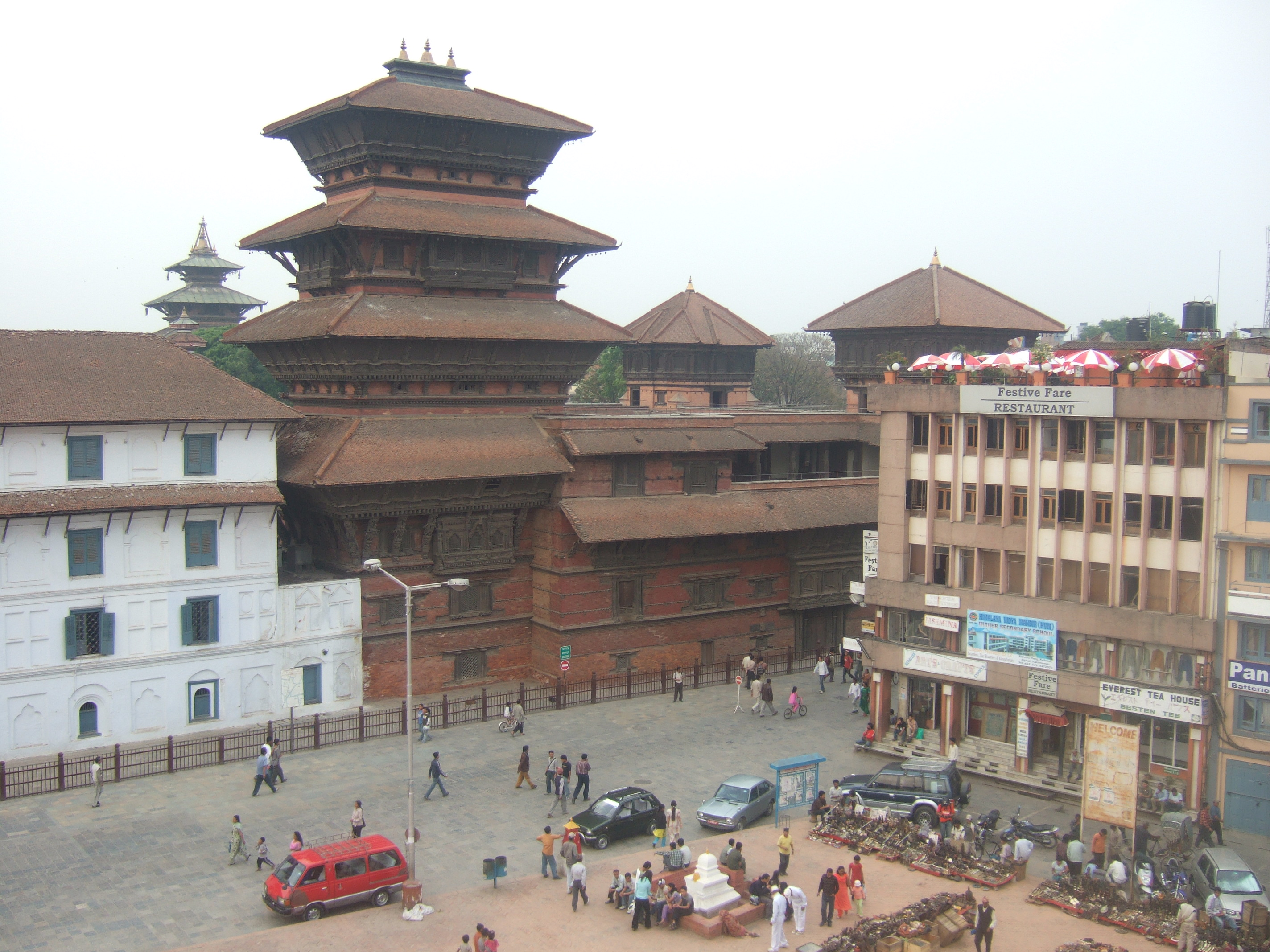
Old Royal Palace in Kathmandu (Kantipur).

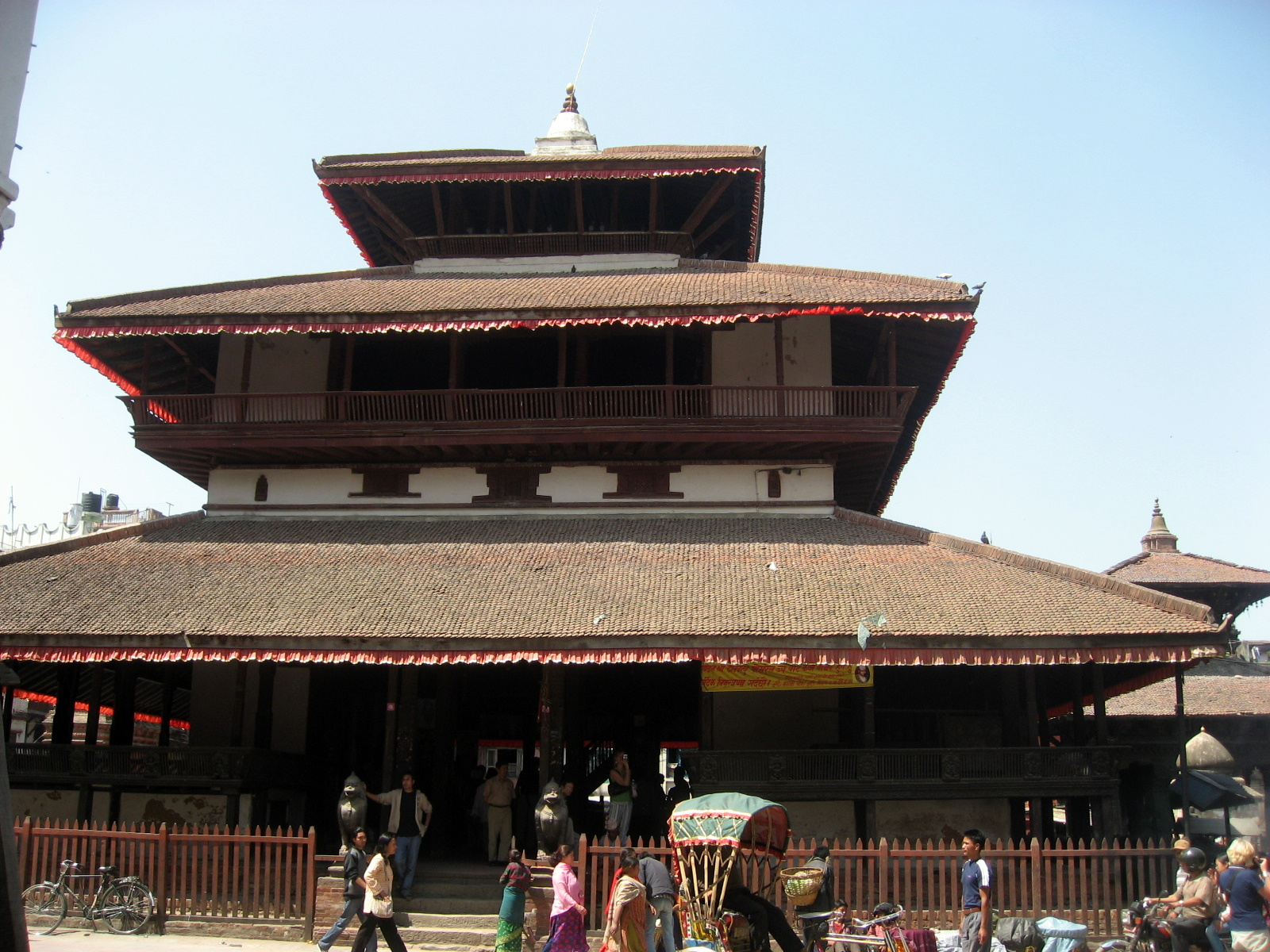
Kasthamandap complex (Kantipur).

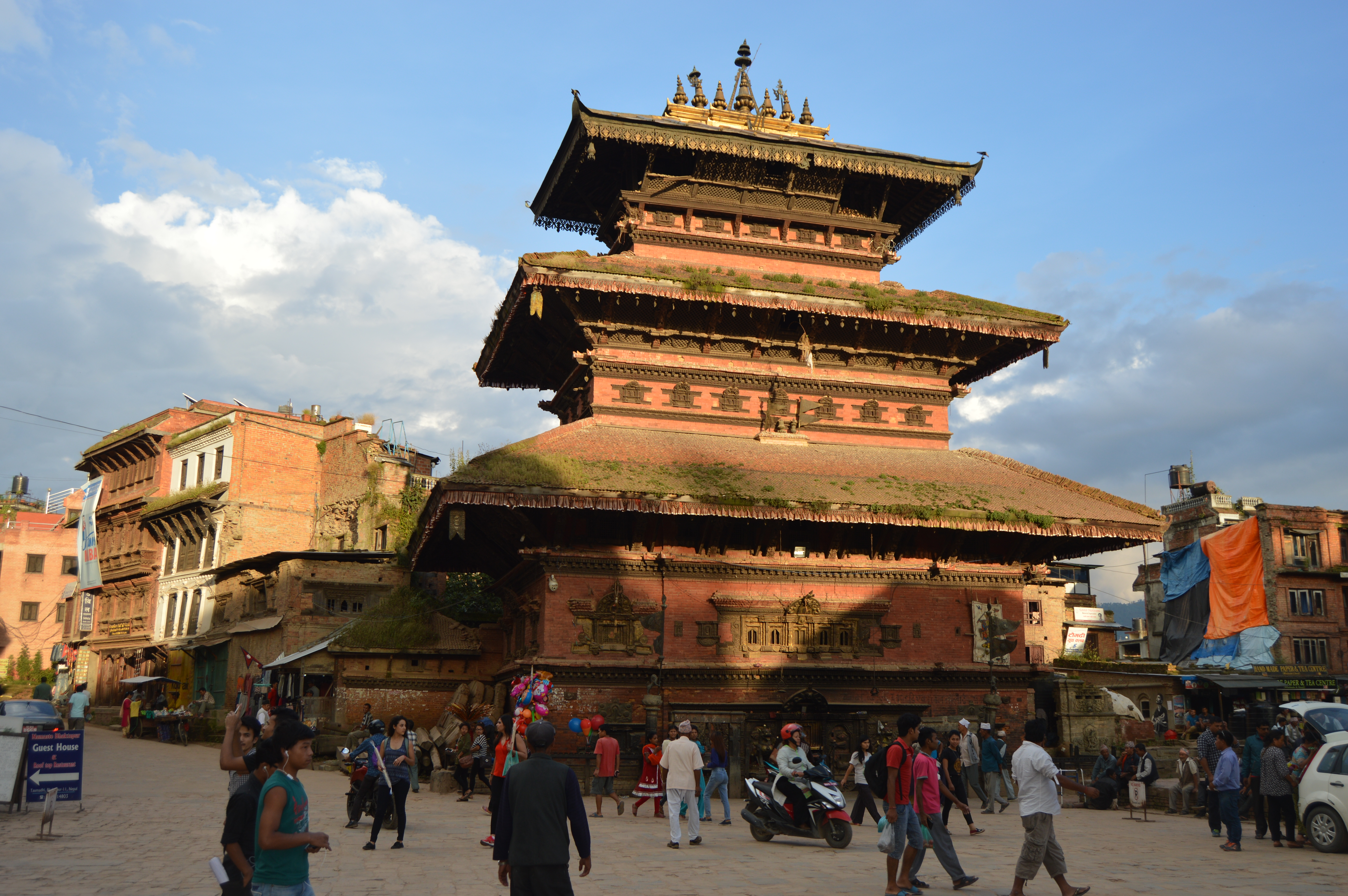
Bhairabnath at Bhaktapur Durbar Square

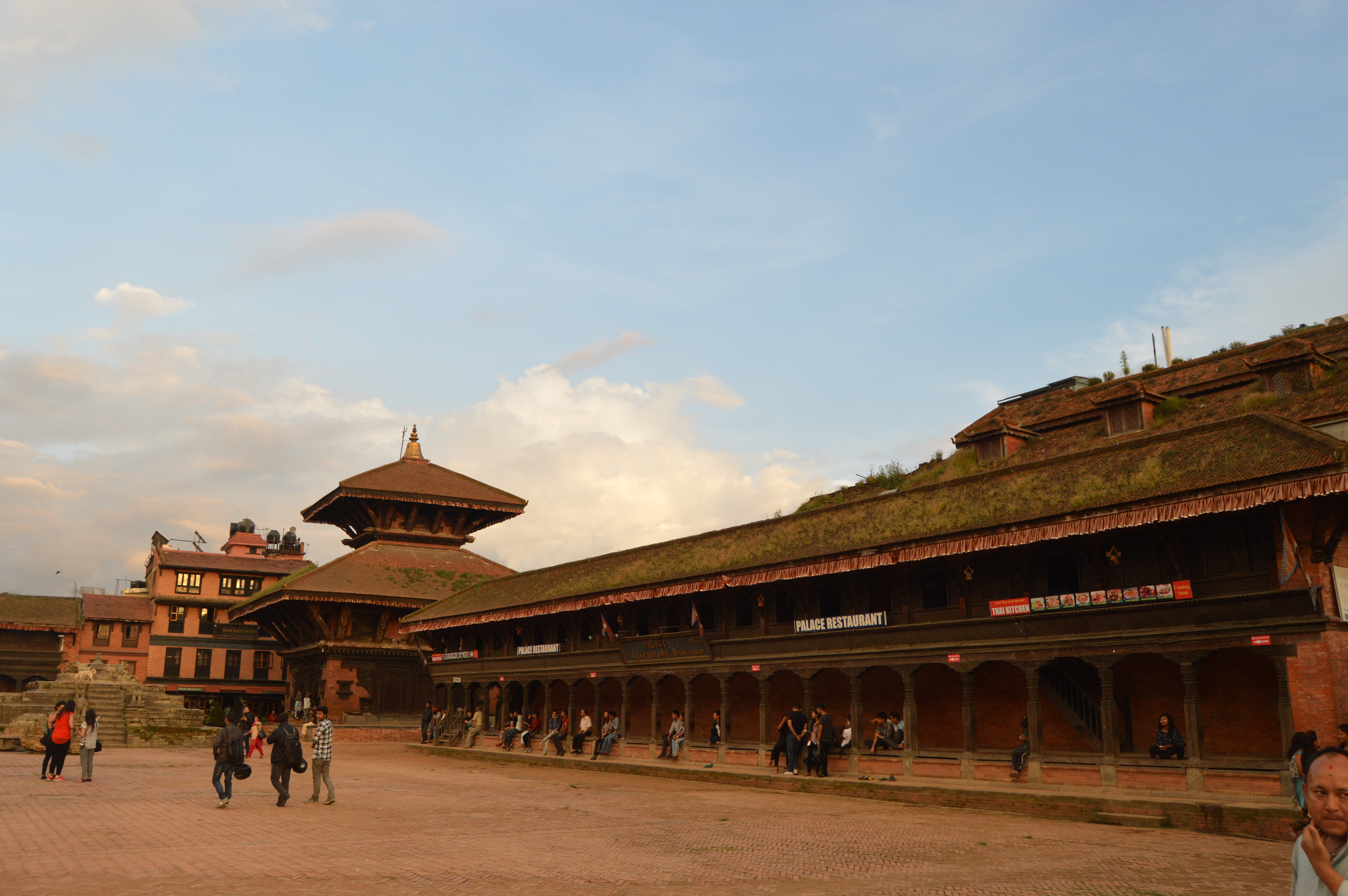
Bhaktapur Durbar square

== See also ==
- Battle of Kathmandu
- Battle of Lalitpur
- Battle of Bhaktapur
