= Abhaya Malla =

13th-century King of Kathmandu Valley

King of Nepal
- Reign: 1216–1255
- Predecessor: Aridev Malla
- Successor: Jayadeva Malla
- Born: ? Nepal
- Died: 1255; Nepal
- Issue: Jayadeva Malla
- Dynasty: Malla
- Father: Aridev Malla

Abhaya Malla (Newar: 𑐀𑐨𑐫 𑐩𑐮𑑂𑐮) was the second Malla king of Nepal and a son of Aridev Malla. He succeeded his father in 1216 and died during the 1255 earthquake which wiped out a third of the population of the Kathmandu Valley.

== Reign ==
=== External invasions ===
His reign was generally turbulent and Abhaya faced many attacks from his neighboring kingdoms. He was attacked by Ranasura, and three times by the Tirhuts from Simrangaudh. On the third attempt in 1245, the Tirhuts, whose army was led by Ramasimhadeva, reached as far as Gokarna but were surrounded and part of the invading army was massacred.

=== Internal conflicts ===
In 1242, Kirtipur and a part of Bhadgaon were attacked by rebels who took some local residents as prisoners.

From around 1249, Jayasimha Malla of Bhadgaon and Jayabhimadeva of Banepa started gathering political powers and imprisoned significant nobles.

== Death ==
A disastrous earthquake on 7 June 1255 killed more than one-third of the population and left Abhaya Malla injured. He died of his injuries six days later and was succeeded by his son Jayadeva Malla.

Preceded by Aridev Malla	King of Nepal; 1216–1255	Succeeded by Jayadeva Malla
