= Arimalla =

13th-century King of Kathmandu Valley

Ari Malla

King of Nepal
- Reign: 1201–1216
- Successor: Abhaya Malla
- Born: 1153; Nepal
- Died: 1216 (aged 62–63)
- Issue: Abhaya Malla
- Dynasty: Malla

Arimalla (Newar: 𑐀𑐬𑐶𑐩𑐮𑑂𑐮), also known as Aridev Malla (𑐀𑐬𑐶𑐡𑐾𑐰 𑐩𑐮𑑂𑐮), was the first king of the Malla dynasty in the Kathmandu valley, also known as Nepal Mandala at that time.

== Etymology of Malla ==
A manuscript bearing the name of Arimalla, Bhujimol script, dated NS 322 or 1201 CE

Beginning in the early twelfth century, leading notables in Kathmandu valley began to appear with names ending in the term Malla, (literally wrestler in Sanskrit), indicating a person of great strength and power. Aridev was a great admirer of wrestling and was a wrestler himself, thus it is possible that he added the word Malla to his name and then the Malla dynasty came into existence. However, this is debated as the word Malla already existed before the Malla dynasty came into existence such as the place Mallapuri conquered by Manadeva. He was the first king to be called so, and the practice of adopting such a name was followed regularly by rulers in Nepal until the eighteenth century.

Another possibility is that Aridev adopted the title Malla because it was popular at the time in India. It seems more convincing because Aridev belonged to the dynasty started by Vamadeva, and that none of his predecessors used Malla in their names. If such is the case, it makes the Malla dynasty separate from the Malla community which originated in India.

== Reign ==
Although the cause of his reign is unclear, it is believed that he reigned from 1201 to 1216 and was succeeded by his son Abhaya Malla.

| Preceded by Kingdom established | King of Nepal; 1201–1216 | Succeeded by Abhaya Malla |
