= Nepal Mandala =

Cultural region in central Nepal

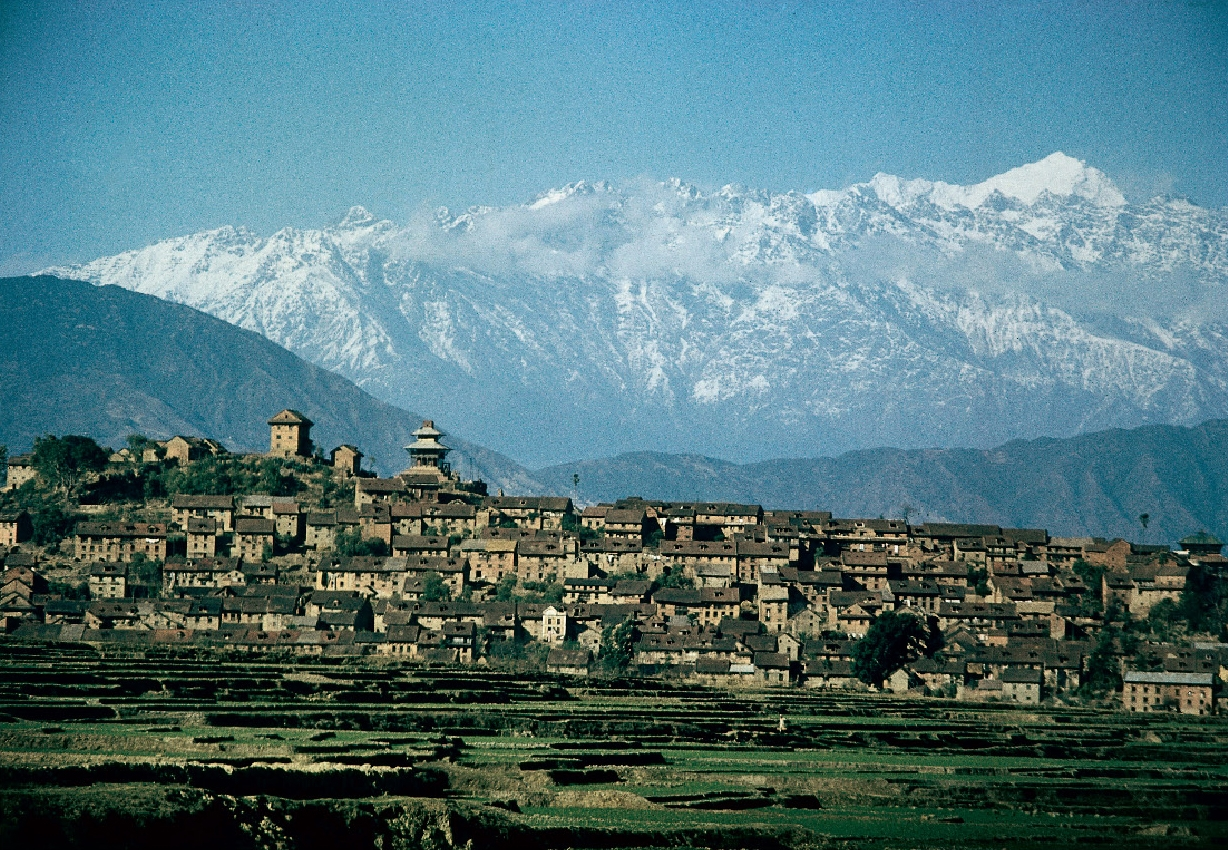
Kirtipur with the Himalaya in the background.

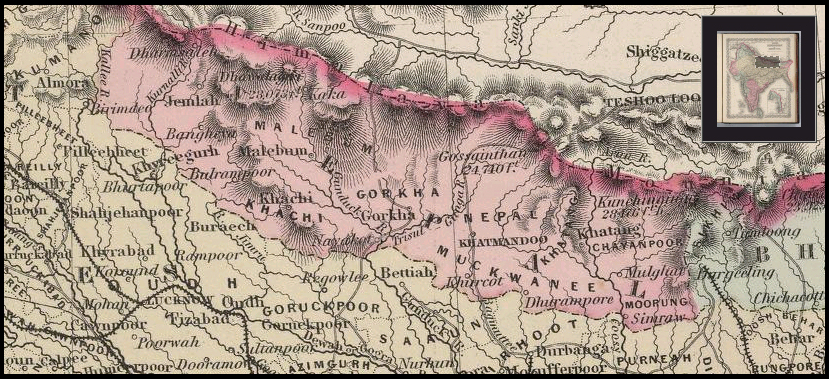
Map from 1886 showing Nepal Mandala between Gorkha in the west, Khatang in the east and Muckwanee in the south.

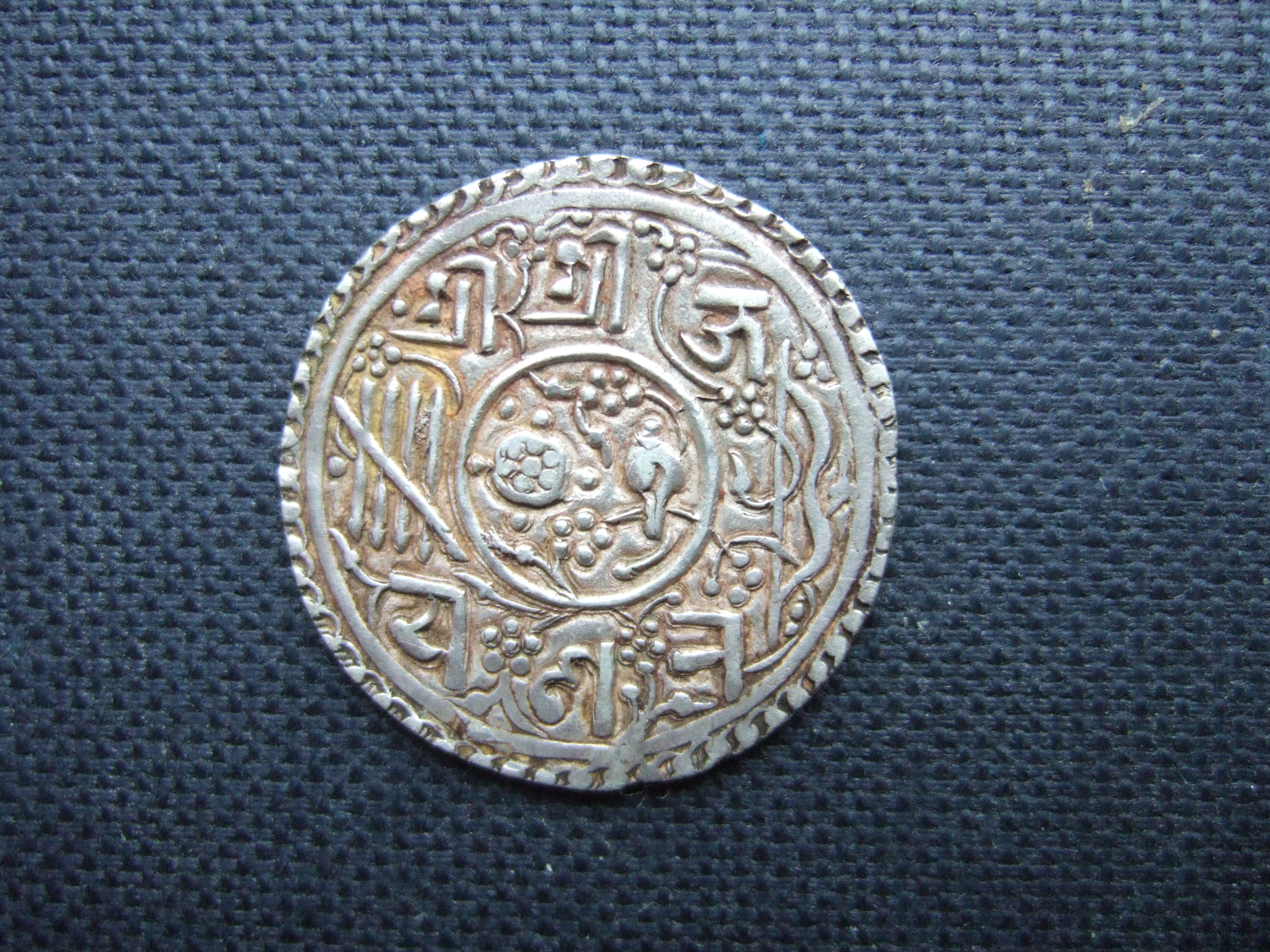
Silver coin issued by the kingdoms of Nepal Mandala, circulated in Tibet till the 18th century.

Nepal Mandala (Newar: 𑐣𑐾𑐥𑐵𑐮 𑐩𑐞𑑂𑐜𑐮; Nepali: नेपाल मण्डल) was a historical region in present-day central Nepal, consisting of the Kathmandu Valley and surrounding areas. According to the Outline History of Nepal, Nepal consisted of three kingdoms during the early medieval period: Khasa in the west, Karnatak in the south and Nepal Mandala in the centre. Bhaktapur was the capital of Nepal Mandala until the 15th century when three capitals, including Kathmandu and Lalitpur, were established. The rule of the indigenous Newars in Nepal Mandala ended with its conquest by the Gorkha Kingdom and the rise of the Shah dynasty in 1768.

== Cultural area ==
The extent of Nepal Mandala has traditionally been defined by the locations of 64 Hindu and 24 Buddhist pilgrimage sites. The Hindu shrines consist of 64 Shiva lingas scattered from Brahmeswar in Nuwakot district in the west to Bhimeswar in Dolakha District in the east.

The 24 Buddhist pilgrimage sites are spread from the Trishuli River in the west to Dolalghat in the east. When seen as an ordered pattern, they form the mandala of Chakrasamvara, the principal deity of Vajrayana Buddhism. The Nepal Mandala was conceived on the basis of the Chakrasamvara Mandala.

Francis Buchanan-Hamilton has written in An Account of the Kingdom Of Nepal published in 1819 that four pilgrimage spots marked the boundaries of Nepal Proper: Nilkantha (an eight-day journey north from Kathmandu), Nateswar (three days to the south), Kaleswar (two days to the west), and Bhimeswar (four days to the east).

== Political area ==
The term mandala also means country, and it has been used to represent traditional political formations such as federations of kingdoms. The area comprising Kathmandu, Lalitpur, Bhaktapur and Dolakha during the Malla period is generally known as Nepal Mandala.

According to the Outline History of Nepal, Nepal Mandala was situated between the Khas and Simraungarh kingdoms. The Khasa Kingdom extended from Garhwal in the west to the Trishuli River in the east, and from Lake Manasarovar in the north to the Terai in the south. Karnata, also called Simraungarh, was situated in the Terai.

Western travelers in the late 18th century have written that Nepal's borders extended to Tibet in the north, the nation of the Kirata in the east, the kingdom of Makwanpur in the south and the Trishuli River in the west which separated it from the kingdom of Gorkha.

In 1661, Jesuit fathers Johann Grueber and Albert d'Orville travelled from Tibet to India through Nepal. They mentioned in their report that they passed through "Cuthi", the first town in the kingdom of "Necbal" (Nepal), and arrived in "Cadmendu" (Kathmandu), the capital of "Necbal". From "Cadmendu", a journey of five days brings one to "Hedouda" (Hetauda), a market town in the kingdom of "Maranga".

== The inhabitants ==
The oldest inhabitants of Nepal Mandala were the Newars. Newar civilisation is a blend of different cultures that came together in Nepal Mandala. According to sociologists, the people of Nepal gradually became known as Newar during the fifteenth century under the reign of Pratap Malla of Kathmandu.

== History ==
The Buddhist text Manjushrimula Kalpa mentions Manadeva (reigned 464-506 AD) as being the king of Nepal Mandala. The term Nepal Mandala also appears in the popular Buddhist text Swayambhu Purana. It occurs in a stone inscription at Gyaneswar, Kathmandu dating from the eighth century during the reign of Licchavi king Jayadeva II. Legends also speak about the fact that old Kirati kings offered the throne of the Mandala to the Shakya clan, which is attributed to the origins of Buddhism.

The term Nepal Mandala has been used through the centuries in stone and copper inscriptions and the colophons of manuscripts when mentioning the dedicator's address. It is also referred to during important Buddhist ceremonies.

== See also ==
- Mandala (political model)
- Malla dynasty (Nepal)
