= Timeline of Nepalese history =

This is a timeline of Nepalese history, comprising important legal and territorial changes and political events in Nepal and its predecessor states. To read about the background to these events, see History of Nepal. See also the list of prime ministers of Nepal, list of monarchs of Nepal and list of years in Nepal.

== Before the common era ==
Year	Event
563 BCE	Gautama Buddha is born in Kapilvastu in 563 BCE (died in 483 BCE) in Lumbini (present-day Nepal).
250 BCE	Emperor Ashoka visits Nepal.

== 3rd century ==
Year	Event
205	Establishment of the Soma dynasty.

== 4th century ==
Year	Event
305	Bhaskar Varma, the last ruler of the Soma dynasty, having no sons or daughters adopts Bhoomi Varma to succeed him starting the rule of Licchavi dynasty.

== 5th century ==
Year	Event
464	Manadeva reigns until 491 A.D. His reign is characterized by great architectural and sculptural achievements.

== 6th century ==
Year	Event
588	Shivadeva I becomes the king.
598	Amshuverma, who started as a feudal lord and now the prime minister, starts minting coins in his name and assumes the title of Maharajadhiraj reducing the king to a mere figurehead. Eventually, he marries the king's daughter and succeeds Shiva Deva I as the ruler after the king's death. Amshuverma's reign is also characterized by architectural achievements.

== 7th century ==
Date	Event
621	Following the death of Amshuverma, Uday Deva becomes the king reviving the Licchavi dynasty's rule.
624	Uday Deva is ousted by his brother Dhruva Deva, and Jishnu Gupta. He goes to Tibet for help. Dhruva Deva and Jishnu Gupta rule together.
~627	Jishnu Gupta's absolute rule commences. He also mints coin in his name.
631	Bishnu Gupta, son of Jishnu Gupta, and Bhimarjuna Deva rule together.
643	Narendradeva reclaims his ancestral throne with the Tibetan Empire's help.
649	Narendradeva sends a cavalry of 7,000 troops to aid Tibet in the Battle of Chabuheluo against Arunasva who attacked the emissary Wang Xuance from China.
685	Shivadeva II, the son of Narendradeva, starts his reign. He marries Batsa Devi, daughter of the prince Bhogvarma of Magadha.

== 8th century ==
Year	Event
705	Jayadeva II starts his reign until up to 733. After him, Nepal enters into a dark era which lasts until 1200 C.E.

== 11th century ==
Year	Date	Event
1097		Nanyadeva establishes the Karnat dynasty in Simraungadh.

== 12th century ==
Year	Date	Event
1147		King Nanyadeva of the Karnat dynasty dies. He is succeeded by his son Gangadeva.

== 13th century ==
Year	Event
1201	Arimalla, the first king of the Malla dynasty rules the Kathmandu valley.
1216	King Arimalla is succeeded by his son Abhaya Malla.
1255	King Abhaya Malla dies in a massive earthquake that killed one-third of the whole population. He is succeeded by his son Jayadeva Malla.
1244	Doya from Mithila (Karnat dynasty) invades Nepal three times within two years.
1258	A period of political struggle begins between the House of Bhonta (the region of Banepa) headed by Jayabhimadeva and the House of Tripura (Bhadgaon) headed by Jayasimha Malla.
1258	King Jayadeva Malla dies. The two contending houses reach an agreement to share the throne alternately. Jayabhimadeva becomes the King following the agreement.
1271	Jayasimha Malla becomes the King following the agreement between the two Houses.
1274	King Jayasimha Malla is deposed with the help of House of Bhonta; Ananta Malla becomes the king.
1287	Jitari Malla of the Khasa area in the Karnali region attacks Nepal three times until 1290.

== 14th century ==
Year	Event
1300	Doya from Mithila invades Nepal again penetrating as far as Bhadgaon, and inflicting fines on the House of Tripura.
1308	King Ananta Malla dies, leaving the throne vacant.
1311	After Jayasaktideva of House of Bhonta is defeated by Jayatunga Malla of House of Tripura, Jayasaktideva calls the Doya for help. This backfires as the Doya imprisoned Brahmins, looted people and set houses on fire.
1312	Following an agreement between the House of Tripura and the Tirhuts, along with other wealth, Devalakshmidevi, the daughter of Jayatunga Malla, is given in marriage to King Harisimhadeva.
1312	Ripu Malla from the Khasa kingdom visits the Kathmandu valley.
1312	Jayarudra Malla, the son of Jayatunga Malla, controls much of the valley.
1313	After five years without a King, Jayarudra Malla installs Jayanandadeva, his rival from the House of Bhonta, as the ruler.
1320	Jayarudra Malla withdraws support for Jayanandadeva and installs Jayari Malla, his relative and the son of Ananta Malla, as the King.
1324	The Karnat Kingdom of Mithila is annexed by the King of Delhi. The invader then sets up a vassal state appointing from the Oiniwar dynasty a ruler of the region.
1324	King Harisimhadeva of Mithila, along with his wife Devalakshmidevi and so Jagatsimha flees to Kathmandu Valley. Harisimha dies on the way and Devalakshmidevi, and Jagatsimha were welcomed by her brother, Jayarudra Malla.
1328	Aditya Malla from the Khasa Kingdom invades the Kathmandu valley.
1330	Jayarudra Malla dies at the age of 30, leaving Nayakadevi, his daughter, to assume the throne of House of Tripura.
1335	Harischandra, the husband of Nayakadevi, was poisoned by the nobles.
~1338	Nayakadevi marries Jagatsimha, the son of Harisimhadeva and Devalakshmidevi. This event connects all the later Mallas of Kathmandu valley to the Karnat dynasty.
1344	King Jayari Malla dies.
1347	Rajalladevi is born to Nayakadevi and Jagatsimha. Nayakadevi dies ten days later and Jagatsimha was thrown to prison leaving Rajalladevi to the care of Devalakshmidevi.
1347	Devalakshmidevi comes to an agreement with the House of Bhonta on the condition that a king would be from the House of Bhonta while Devalakshmidevi would act as the de facto ruler. Following this agreement, Jayarajadeva, the illegitimate son of the late King Jayanandadeva, becomes the King. Devalakshmidevi, however, is given royal titles higher than the King himself.
1349	Sultan Shams ud-din Ilyas of Bengal conquers Tirhut and leads raid in Kathmandu Valley destroying temples and damaging the images of gods and goddesses. This event is often cited as the one that destroyed much of the Lichchhavi era and early Malla era monuments and artifacts.
1354	Rajalladevi marries Jayasthiti Malla. It is generally accepted that Jayasthiti Malla was brought from Mithila by Devalakshmidevi to marry Rajalladevi.
1361	King Jayarajadeva dies. He is succeeded by his son Jayarjunadeva.
1366	Devalakshmidevi dies. Jayasthiti Malla starts on gathering political power.
1382	Jayasthiti Malla rules as king of the united Malla kingdom in Kathmandu Valley.
1395	King Jayasthiti Malla dies. His three sons Dharma Malla, Jyoti Malla, and Kiti Malla rule together.

== 15th century ==
Year	Event
1408	Jyoti Malla rules as the sole king of Kathmandu Valley after the death of both his brothers.
1428	King Jyoti Malla dies. His son Yakshya Malla succeeds him.
1482	King Yakshya Malla dies. His kingdom is divided in three between his sons with Ratna Malla controlling Kantipur, and Raya Malla controlling Bhaktapur.

== 16th century ==
Year	Event
1520	King Ratna Malla dies. His son Surya Malla succeeds him as the king.
1526	Mukunda Sen of Palpa attacks the entire Kathmandu valley and surrounds both Kantipur, and Patan. He is defeated by the combined forces of the valley.
1530	King Surya Malla dies. He is succeeded by his son Amara Malla. Amara Malla annexed several villages north-west of Kantipur.
1560	King Amara Malla dies. His son Mahendra Malla succeeds him. Mahendra Malla issued the first silver coins.
1574	King Mahendra Malla is succeeded by his first son Sadashiva Malla.
1581	Shivasimha Malla, the second son of Mahendra Malla, deposes his brother Sadashiva Malla and rules Kantipur. Sadashiva takes refuge in Bhadgaon where he dies.

== 17th century ==
Year	Event
1600	King Shivasimha Malla annexes Patan and installs his son Harisimhadeva as the governor. Harisimhadeva dies shortly afterwards, and his son Siddhi Narasimha Malla succeeds him as the governor.
1606	Ram Shah of Gorkha reigns; Gorkha kingdom experiences its first expansion (to 1633).
1619	King Shivasimha Malla dies. His son Lakshmi Narasimha Malla succeeds him as the King of Kantipur, and his grandson Siddhi Narasimha Malla declares Patan independent from Kantipur.
1641	King Lakshmi Narasimha Malla goes insane after executing his loyal minister. Pratap Malla imprisons him and rules Kantipur.
1674	Nripendra Malla starts his reign after his Pratap Malla's death defying the wishes of his father to install Mahipatendra Malla as the king.
1680	Parthibendra Malla, another son of Pratap Malla, starts his reign after the death of King Nripendra Malla.
1687	King Parthibendra Malla is poisoned by the nobles and on his death, as many as twenty-four women went Sati. He is succeeded by his 14 years old son Bhupalendra Malla with his wife Riddhilakshmi acting as the regent.
1688	Lakshminarayan, a minister, rises to the power of supreme authority and inscribes his name on the coin issued by the monarch. He also assassinates prominent nobles.
1690	Lakshminarayan is assassinated following a rumor of illicit relationship with the regent and the king's mother, Riddhilakshmi.

== 18th century ==
Year	Date	Event
1700		King Bhupalendra Malla dies. He is succeeded by his son Bhaskara Malla.
1717		King Bhaskara Malla proclaims the title of King of Patan and issues coins under the name Gajapati Mahindra Simha.
1720		An epidemic breaks out in Kantipur killing approximately 20,000 people.
1722		After about six months in confinement to be safe from the plague, King Bhaskara Malla returns to the palace after the death rate dropped. He dies some days later due to the plague. He is succeeded by Jagajjaya Malla, the grandson of Mahipatendra Malla.
1730		King Jagajjaya Malla's first son Rajendra Malla dies.
1736		Jayaprakash Malla succeeds King Jagajjaya Malla after the latter's death.
1743		Prithvi Narayan Shah ascends to throne of Gorkha.
1764		British East India Company gains control of Bengal.
1768		Gorkha ruler Prithvi Narayan Shah conquers Kathmandu and lays foundations for unified kingdom.
1769		Conquest of Chaudandi and Majh Kirant states.
1792		Nepalese expansion is halted by the defeat at hands of Chinese in Tibet.

== 19th century ==
Year	Date	Event
1806		Bhimsen Thapa becomes the first Mukhtiyar (prime minister).
1809		Nepalese troops lay siege to Kangra, farthest extent of Gurkha empire.
1814		Anglo-Nepalese War (1814–1816) ends resulting in Sugauli Treaty which establishes Nepal's current boundaries and sows the seeds for political instability.
1837		Bhimsen Thapa falls, beginning unstable period in court politics.
1846		Kot massacre results in the killing of more than 40 members of the palace and starts the autocratic Rana dynasty in Nepal with Jung Bahadur Rana as its first prime minister.
1855		War starts with China (until 1858).
1856		Royal decree gives absolute power to prime minister and his family.
1857		Sepoy Rebellion is waged against British in north India; Nepal aids British (until 1858).
1858		Jang Bahadur receives the title of Rana.
1877		Prime minister Jung Bahadur Rana dies; Ranodip Singh Kunwar becomes the prime minister.
1885		Prime minister Ranodip Singh Kunwar is assassinated by his nephews; Bir Shumsher becomes the prime minister.

== 20th century ==
Year	Date	Event
1901	5 Mar	Prime minister Bir Shumsher dies; Dev Shumsher becomes the prime minister.
1901	27 Mar	Prime minister Dev Shumsher is deposed by his relatives; Chandra Shumsher becomes the prime minister.
1914		Thousands of Nepalese citizens (including the Gurkhas) fight as soldiers for British in World War I (to 1918)
1923	21 Dec	Treaty with Britain affirms Nepal's sovereignty.
1935	2 June	Nepal's first political party, Nepal Praja Parishad is founded (led by Tanka Prasad Acharya).
1939		Tens of thousands of Nepalese citizens (including Gurkhas) fight as soldiers for the British in World War II (to 1945).
1946	25 Jan	Nepali National Congress is formed (led by BP Koirala, Matrika Prasad Koirala, Ganesh Man Singh, etc.).
1948		Prime Minister Padma Shamsher Rana announces first constitution of Nepal, then resigns; his replacement, Mohan Shamsher Rana, represses opposition
1951	7 Jan	Tribhuvan returns from exile and reclaims the title of King putting an end to the autocratic Rana dynasty
1951	18 Feb	Rana system is abolished. Democratic experiment inaugurated with the appointment of an interim government under Prime Minister Mohan Shamsher.
1951	16 Nov	Matrika Prasad Koirala becomes the first commoner to be elected a prime minister
1953	29 May	New Zealander Edmund Hillary and Nepal's Sherpa Tenzing Norgay become the first climbers to reach the summit of Mount Everest.
1955	15 Mar	King Tribhuwan dies, King Mahendra ascends throne.
1955	14 Dec	Nepal joins the United Nations.
1959	27 May	Multi-party constitution is adopted and the first general elections in Nepal brings Nepali Congress to power with B.P. Koirala as the first democratically elected prime minister.
1960	15 Dec	King Mahendra leads a coup d'état dismissing the cabinet of B.P. Koirala and introduces the Panchayat, a partyless political system.
1962		New constitution provides for non-party system of councils known as Panchayat under which king exercises sole power. First elections to Rastrya Panchayat held in 1963.
1972	31 Jan	King Mahendra dies, succeeded by Birendra.
1980	2 May	In the 1980 Nepalese governmental system referendum, the people vote in favor of the Panchayat system against a multi-party system. The Panchayat system receives a total of 2.4 million votes, while the multi-party system receives 2 million votes.
1985		Communist Party of Nepal (Unified Marxist–Leninist) begins civil disobedience campaign for restoration of multi-party system.
1989		Trade and transit dispute with India leads to border blockade by Delhi resulting in worsening economic situation.
1990	18 Feb	1990 Nepalese revolution commences led by Nepali Congress and the communist parties.
1991	12 May	First multi-party election is held. NC wins a majority of 110 seats. The communist parties gather a total of 82 seats. Girija Prasad Koirala becomes the prime minister.
1994	11 July	Division within the NC results in Girija Prasad Koirala losing the support of 36 congress members in a parliamentary vote. He resigns and King Birendra dismisses the cabinet announcing a new election.
1994	15 Nov	Second multi-party election is held. CPN (UML) led by Man Mohan Adhikari wins the election with 88 votes. NC led by Girija Prasad Koirala wins 83 votes. RPP led by Surya Bahadur Thapa wins 20 votes. Man Mohan Adhikari heads a minority government.
1995		Radical leftist group, the CPN (MC), begins insurrection in rural areas aimed at abolishing monarch and establishing a people's republic, sparking a conflict that would drag on for over a decade.
1995	10 Sep	Prime minister Man Mohan Adhikari resigns after losing in a Congress-led no-confidence motion. Sher Bahadur Deuba becomes the new prime minister.
1997	6 Mar	Prime Minister Sher Bahadur Deuba loses a no-confidence vote, ushering in a period of increased political instability, with frequent changes of the prime minister.
2000	16 Mar	Girija Prasad Koirala returns as the prime minister, heading the ninth government in 10 years.

== 21st century ==
Year	Date	Event
2001	1 June	Nepalese royal massacre occurs; King Birendra and his family dies, and Dipendra is crownd king while in hospital.
2001	4 June	King Dipendra is pronounced dead; His uncle Gyanendra becomes the king.
2001	26 July	Maoist rebels step up campaign of violence. Prime Minister Girija Prasad Koirala quits over the violence; succeeded by Sher Bahadur Deuba.
2001	13 Nov	Maoists end four-month-old truce with government, declare peace talks with government failed. Launch coordinated attacks on army and police posts.
2001	26 Nov	The government declares a state of emergency throughout the country and full mobilization of the army against rebels listing the CPN (Maoist Centre) as a "terrorist organization".
2002	22 May	King Gyanendra dissolves the parliament and called for early elections. Sher Bahadur Deuba heads the interim government, and renews the state of emergency.
2002	4 Oct	Prime minister Deuba formally asks the king to defer the election dates until November 2003. King Gyanendra responds by dismissing the government headed by Deuba, removing Deuba as the prime minister, postponing the elections indefinitely, and assuming full executive power.
2002	11 Oct	Lokendra Bahadur Chand is appointed as the prime minister.
2003	Jan	Rebels, government declare ceasefire.
2003	5 June	Lokendra Bahadur Chand resigns as PM; king appoints his own nominee Surya Bahadur Thapa as new premier (to June).
2003	Aug	Rebels pull out of peace talks with government and end seven-month truce. The following months see resurgence of violence and frequent clashes between students/activists and police.
2004	Apr	Nepal joins the World Trade Organisation (WTO).
2004	May	Royalist Prime Minister Surya Bahadur Thapa resigns following weeks of street protests by opposition groups.
2004	5 June	King Gyanendra reappoints Sher Bahadur Deuba as prime minister with the task of holding elections.
2005	1 Feb	2005 Nepal coup d'état by King Gyanendra after which he assumes absolute direct power, sacks the government, and declares a state of emergency restoring absolute monarchy. Many prominent leaders including the prime minister were placed under house arrest.
2005	30 Apr	King lifts the state of emergency amid international pressure.
2005	22 Nov	Several political parties and the CPN (Maoist Centre) sign an agreement to work together against the rule of King Gyanendra.
2006	24 Apr	King Gyanendra reinstates the dissolved parliament calling the Seven Party Alliance to lead the government.
2006	May	Parliament votes unanimously to curtail the king's political powers. The government and Maoist rebels begin peace talks, the first in nearly three years.
2006	16 June	Rebel leader Chairman Prachanda and PM Koirala hold talks – the first such meeting between the two sides – and agree that the Maoists should be brought into an interim government.
2006	Nov	Comprehensive Peace Accord is signed between the Government of Nepal and Maoist Leader Prachanda which allows the Maoist to join mainstream politics.
2007	Jan	Maoist leaders enter parliament under the terms of a temporary constitution. Violent ethnic protests erupt in the south-east; demonstrators demand autonomy for the region.
2007	Apr	Former Maoist rebels join interim government, a move that takes them into the political mainstream.
2007	May	Elections for a constituent assembly pushed back to November.
2007	May	A US offer to resettle thousands of Bhutanese refugees in Nepal has raised hopes but has also sparked tension in the camps, says Human Rights Watch.
2007	Sep	Three bombs hit Kathmandu in the first attack in the capital since the end of the Maoist insurgency.
2007	Sep	Maoists quit interim government to press demand for monarchy to be scrapped. This forces the postponement of November's constituent assembly elections.
2007	Oct	UN Secretary-General Ban Ki-moon urges Nepal's parties to sink their differences to save the peace process.
2007	Dec	Parliament approves abolition of monarchy as part of peace deal with Maoists, who agree to re-join government.
2008	Jan	A series of bomb blasts kill and injure dozens in the southern Terai plains. Groups there have been demanding regional autonomy.
2008	May	Nepali Congress leader Bal Chandra Poudel attacked by maoists in Dandagaun, Rasuwa during election
2008	10 Apr	The First Nepalese Constituent Assembly election is held where the CPN (MC) emerged victorious winning 220 out of the 575 seats. It forms the government with seven other communist parties including the CPN (UML).
2008	28 May	Constituent Assembly abolishes monarchy in Nepal, and declares Nepal a federal republic.
2008	Jun	Maoist ministers resign from the cabinet in a row over who should be the next head of state.
2008	23 July	Dr. Ram Baran Yadav becomes the first president of Nepal.
2008	15 Aug	Prachanda is elected as the prime minister by the constituent assembly.
2009	4 May	Prime minister Prachanda sacks General Rookmangud Katawal. CPN (UML) withdraws its support from the government in protest. President Ram Baran Yadav overrides the decision resulting in the resignation of Prachanda the next day.
2009	25 May	Madhav Kumar Nepal of CPN (UML) becomes the prime minister with support from 22 of the 25 parties.
2010	20 Mar	Former prime minister and NCP leader Girija Prasad Koirala dies.
2010	30 June	Prime minister Madhav Kumar Nepal announces his resignation blaming the CPN (MC) for their continuous obstruction in the government.
2011	3 Feb	CPN (MC) withdraws its candidate and backs Jhala Nath Khanal of CPN (UML). Khanal becomes the prime minister after more than seven months of political gridlock and more than sixteen rounds of voting in the parliament.
2011	28 Aug	Dr. Baburam Bhattarai is elected as the prime minister after he gets support from some smaller parties after the resignation of Jhala Nath Khanal.
2012	28 May	Prime minister Baburam Bhattarai dissolves the constituent assembly after it failed to promulgate a new constitution four years after its election and calls for a fresh election for 22 November.
2013	14 Mar	Prime minister Baburam Bhattarai resigns. Chief Justice Khil Raj Regmi becomes the interim prime minister until the elections after four main political parties agreed to form a CJ-led electoral cabinet.
2013	19 Nov	The Second Nepalese Constituent Assembly election is held where the NC led by Sushil Koirala emerges as the largest party winning 196 out of the 576 seats. The CPN (UML) wins 175 seats while the CPN (MC) wins 80 seats.
2014	25 Feb	Sushil Koirala of Nepali Congress is elected as the prime minister with CPN (UML) backing.
2015	25 Apr	The 7.8 M_{w} Nepal earthquake affected the country with a maximum Mercalli intensity of IX (Violent), the worst natural disaster to strike Nepal since the 1934 Nepal–Bihar earthquake, killing more than 8,000 people and injuring more than 20,000 people.
2015	20 Sep	President Dr. Ram Baran Yadav promulgates the Constitution of Nepal (2015) replacing the Interim Constitution of 2007.
2015	11 Oct	CPN (UML) leader KP Sharma Oli is elected as the prime minister by the parliament with the backing from CPN (MC).
2015	29 Oct	Bidya Devi Bhandari becomes the second president of Nepal.
2016		
2017		Nepal holds its first general election since the end of the civil war, with the Communist party's alliance winning.
2018		
2019		
2020		The COVID-19 pandemic significantly impacts Nepal.
2021		Prime Minister Khadga Prasad Sharma Oli was replaced by Sher Bahadur Deuba following a constitutional crisis within the government.
2022		
2023		The population of Nepal reached 30.2 million people.
2024		
2025		After weeks of deadly youth-led protests against corruption and a social media ban, Nepal's Prime Minister KP Sharma Oli resigned. In the resulting turmoil, protesters set fire to government buildings, and security forces clashed with demonstrators, killing dozens. Former Chief Justice Sushila Karki was sworn in as interim Prime Minister, with elections set for March 2026. Karki pledged to address the youth's demands and serve for a maximum of six months.
2026	26 Aug	2026 Nepal–Tibet floods

== See also ==
- Timeline of Kathmandu
- Timeline of Nepalese politics
