= Kumbheshwar temple complex =

Shrine in Lalitpur, Nepal

Khumbheshwar Temple Complex
- कुम्भेश्वर मन्दिर परिसर (Nepali)
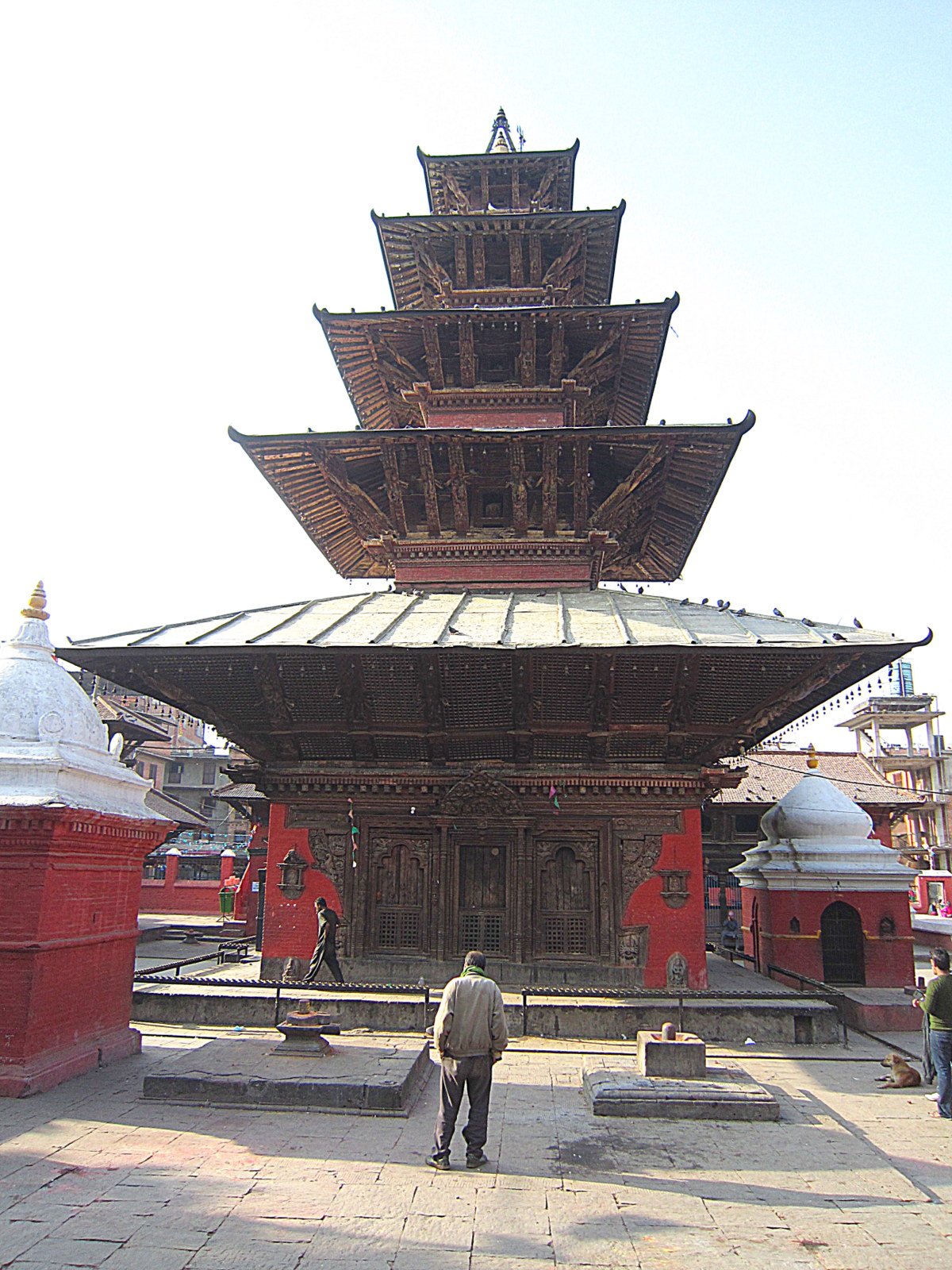
- Kumbheshwar Temple
- Interactive map of Khumbheshwar Temple Complex
- 27°40′35.56″N 85°19′33.93″E
- Location: Lalitpur, Nepal

The Kumbheshwar temple complex is one of the oldest and busiest religious place of the old Patan town lying on its northern part. The major deities whose temple or shrine lies within the complex includes Kumbheshwor Mahadev, Bagalamukhi, Unmanta Bhairava, Gaurikunda, Harati, Manakamana, Kedarnath, Badrinath. The complex houses a natural spring which fills the adjoining ponds, the source of which is said to be Gosaikunda Lake in Rasuwa District. It is therefore believed that taking a dip in the pond during the festival of Janai Purnima (जनै पुर्णिमा) is equivalent to doing the same in Gosainkunda.

== How Patan (Lalitpur) got its name from Kumbheshwar ==
The story goes that a farmer with leprosy from Kathmandu came here because the grass was better for his cow. One day he struck his wooden pole into the ground and discovered a water source. That evening on his way back he saw the king passing by. He stepped off the road as was the custom for someone with leprosy. The king, however, saw no trace of the disease. Instead the king found the man so handsome that he gave him a new name "Lalit" (ललित) or handsome. The king knew a miracle had occurred and asked Lalit what happened. Lalit showed the king where he found the water source and the king pronounced that a hiti (हिटी) (meaning tap) should be placed there. Thus, the place was called Lalitpur (ललितपुर) (meaning the land of fine arts and fine people). Another story tells of a man who lost his water vessel on a pilgrimage who found it again at the Kumbheshwar. The word Kumbha in Kumbheshwar means "water vessel". Whether any of the above is anything more than legend is up for debate. The fact that there is a water source from the Himalayan mountains (Gosainkunda) at Kumbheshwar may yet be another contributing factor. Perhaps Patan got its name from all of the above combined.

== Temples within the complex ==
=== Kumbheshwar Temple ===
The main Kumbheshwar Temple is one of the only two free-standing five-storied temples (other being the Nyatapola Temple in Bhaktapur in Kathmandu valley. It was originally constructed as two storied shrine by King Jayasthiti Malla in around 14th century. The additional 3 stories were given by King Srinivas Malla during 17th century.

=== Bagalamukhi temple ===
Bagalamukhi is one of the most famous Shakti Peeths of the Kathmandu valley and is visited by a large number of devotees especially on Thursdays. The goddess is known as the one who fulfills the devotees’ wishes. The inner shrine is carved with silver.

=== Other structures ===
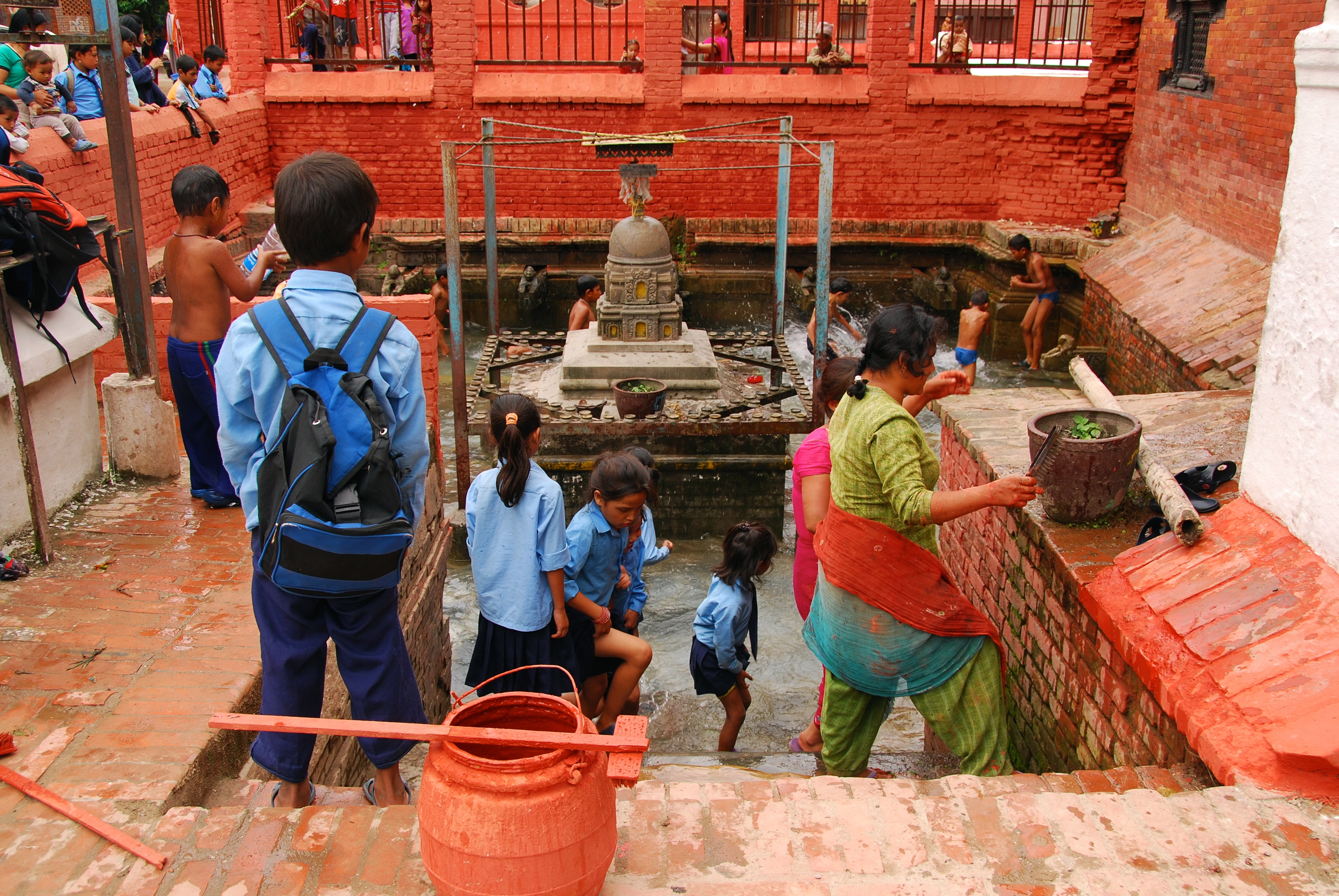
Misha Hiti

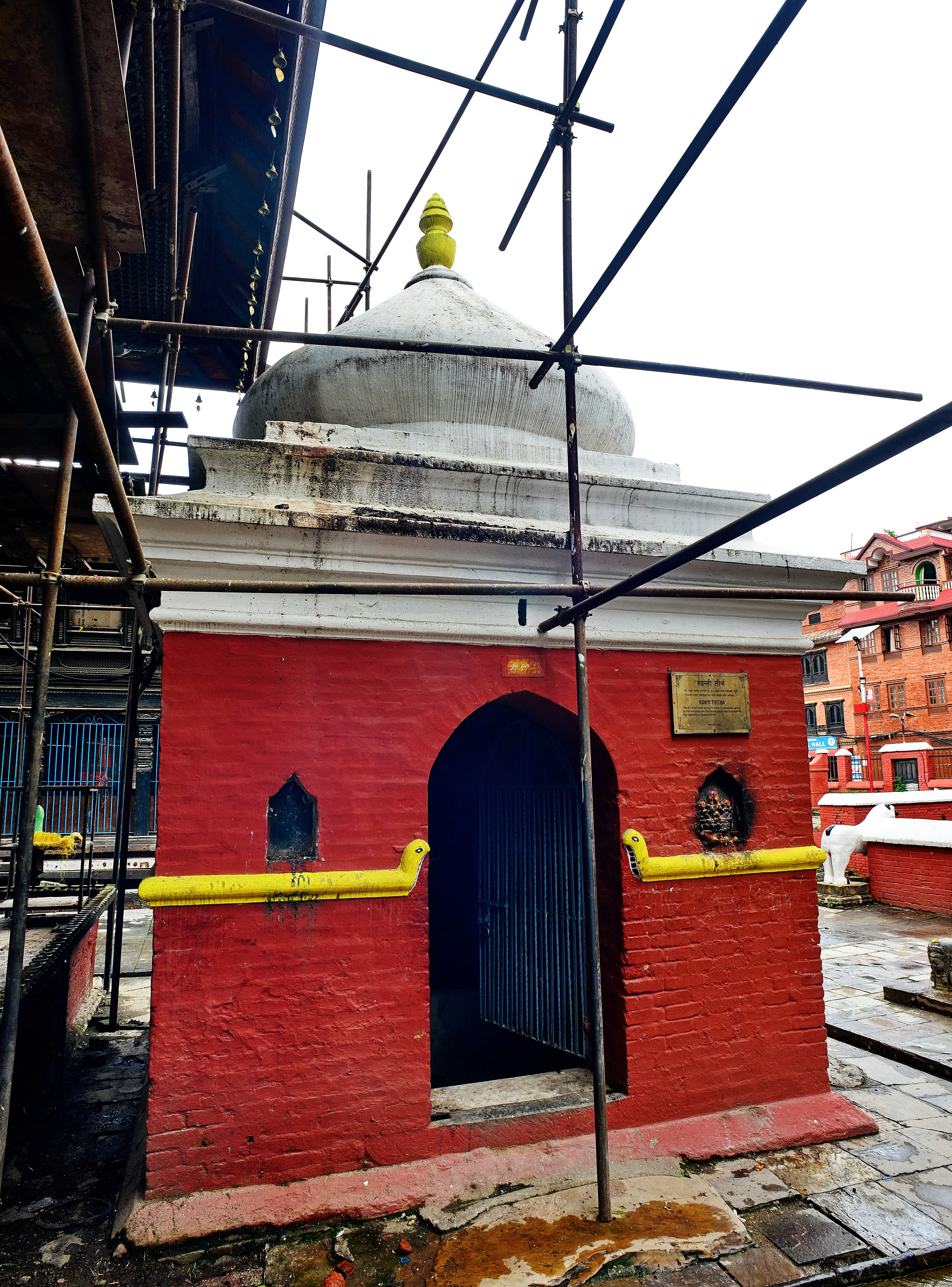
Gaurikund Temple

Other structures within the complex include:

- Badrinath Temple
- Char-Narayan Temple
- Gaurikund Temple houses the water spring whose source is believed to be Gosaikunda Lake
- Harati temple
- Kedarnath Temple
- Kumbeshwar Pokhari, a pond within the complex
- Misha Hiti, a dhunge dhara within the complex

== Major festivals ==
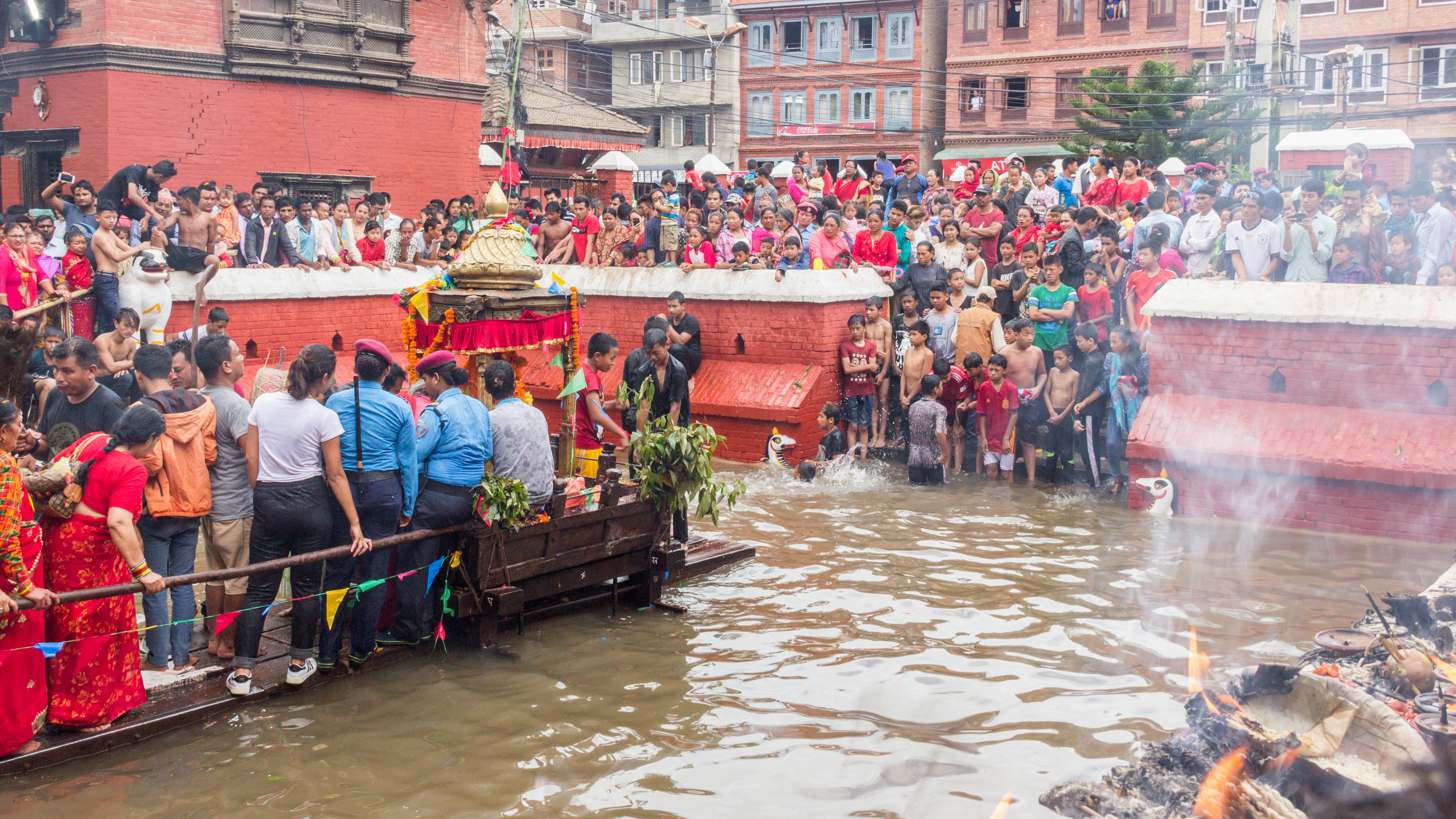
Kumbeshwar Pokhari during Janai Purnima

Kumbeshwar Mela or Janai Purnima Mela (usually August full moon) is one of the major festival where around 2 Lakhs devotees come to worship the embossed silver sheath worn by the temples sacred linga (phallic symbol), which is placed in a special pavilion in the middle of the pond in the hub temple. Kumbeshwar Pokhari (pond) is filled with water for the Mela.

Similarly, various other rituals like “Lakh batti”, ”Bhoj”, ”Bhajan”, “Baratabanda”, “Marriage Ceremony”, “Gupha rakhni ceremony”, etc. are periodically organized by local people at the temple complex. The temple complex also has an open space garden to cater rituals for private purposes, which became one of the major financial sources of temple.
