= 1360 =

1360 in various calendars
- Gregorian calendar: 1360; MCCCLX
- Ab urbe condita: 2113
- Armenian calendar: 809; ԹՎ ՊԹ
- Assyrian calendar: 6110
- Balinese saka calendar: 1281–1282
- Bengali calendar: 766–767
- Berber calendar: 2310
- English Regnal year: 33 Edw. 3 – 34 Edw. 3
- Buddhist calendar: 1904
- Burmese calendar: 722
- Byzantine calendar: 6868–6869
- Chinese calendar: 己亥年 (Earth Pig); 4057 or 3850 — to — 庚子年 (Metal Rat); 4058 or 3851
- Coptic calendar: 1076–1077
- Discordian calendar: 2526
- Ethiopian calendar: 1352–1353
- Hebrew calendar: 5120–5121
- Hindu calendars
- Vikram Samvat: 1416–1417
- Shaka Samvat: 1281–1282
- Kali Yuga: 4460–4461
- Holocene calendar: 11360
- Igbo calendar: 360–361
- Iranian calendar: 738–739
- Islamic calendar: 761–762
- Japanese calendar: Enbun 5 (延文５年)
- Javanese calendar: 1272–1274
- Julian calendar: 1360; MCCCLX
- Korean calendar: 3693
- Minguo calendar: 552 before ROC 民前552年
- Nanakshahi calendar: −108
- Thai solar calendar: 1902–1903
- Tibetan calendar: ས་མོ་ཕག་ལོ་ (female Earth-Boar); 1486 or 1105 or 333 — to — ལྕགས་ཕོ་བྱི་བ་ལོ་ (male Iron-Rat); 1487 or 1106 or 334

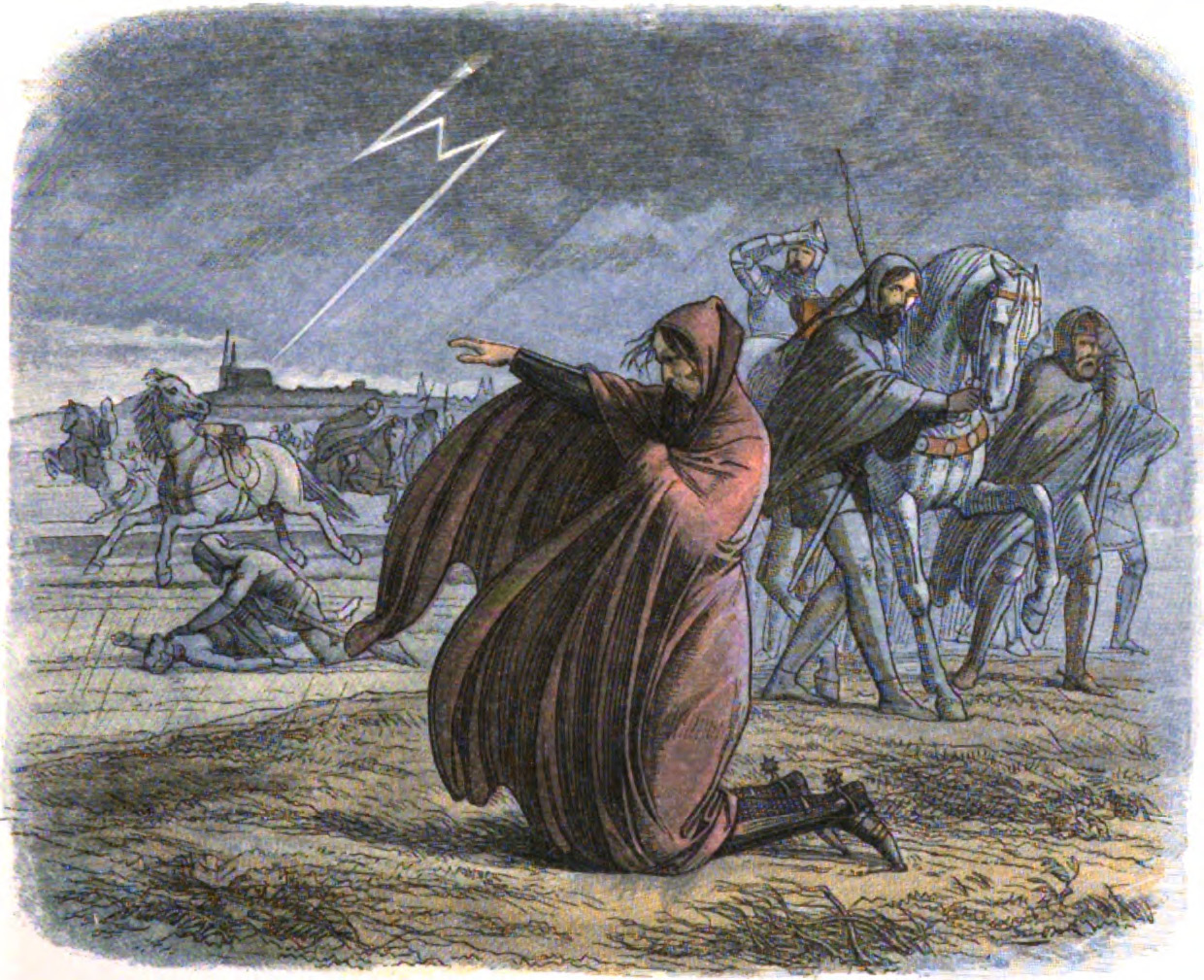
April 14, 1360: King Edward III of England halts his attempt to conquer France the day and asks God's forgiveness after a freak hail storm kills more than 1,000 of his troops and injures thousands of others.

Year 1360 (MCCCLX) was a leap year starting on Wednesday of the Julian calendar.

== Events ==
=== January–March ===
- January 11 – Reims campaign: The Army of France, led by the regent Charles, breaks the Kingdom of England's siege of Reims, then leads the worn-out soldiers into the Duchy of Burgundy to recuperate at Tonnerre.
- January 18 – In Italy, Guido Gonzaga becomes the new Capitano del popolo (Captain of the People) and leader of the city-state of Mantua upon the death of his father, Ludovico I Gonzaga.
- January – The Goryeo Army of Korea launches a counterattack against the invasion by China's Red Turbans, and recaptures Seogyeong only 20 days after it had been lost.
- February 19 – The French Army relocates to Guillen on the borders of Burgundy and remains for a month.
- February 28 – Qulpa of Borjigin, Khan of the Golden Horde, is assassinated after a reign of only six months that followed the murder of his brother, Berdi Beg.
- March 10 – Reims campaign: Philip of Rouvres, Duke of Burgundy, reaches an agreement with King Edward III of England and Edward the Black Prince to avoid an invasion of the Duchy in return for the payment of 200,000 gold moutons.

=== April–June ===
- April 3 – King Edward III summons the English Parliament to assemble at Westminster on May 15.
- April 5 – King Peter I of Cyprus is crowned as King of Jerusalem at a ceremony at Saint Nicholas Cathedral at Famagusta in Cyprus. Although King Peter will never visit Jerusalem, and Palestine has been under Muslim control since 1291, the Kings of Cyprus have continued to claim the title for 70 years.
- April 6 – Reims campaign: King Edward III and the English troops withdraw from Saint-Germain-lès-Arpajon and march toward the English-ruled territory of Brittany, intending to refresh and to make another attempt to attack Paris later in the year. They stop at the gates of Chartres, hoping to provoke the Dauphin of France, Charles, into leading his outnumbered party into battle.
- April 13 – Reims campaign: On what is later called "Black Monday", a freak hail storm strikes at Chartres, where the English are leading a siege. The unsheltered English troops are caught in a severe thunderstorm, accompanied by a drop in the temperature and huge hailstones began falling from the sky, killing more than 1,000 of the 10,000 English troops and 6,000 horses in half an hour. King Edward concludes that the strom is a sign from God to halt the Reims campaign and to drop all claims to the French throne.
- April 14 – The day after the Black Monday hailstorm, French emissary Androin de la Roche, the Abbot of Clurry, arrives at the English camp and proposes a peace agreement to end the war between England and France. King Edward begins the withdrawal of his army from the gates of Chartres.
- April 18 – Jayarjunadeva is proclaimed as the ceremonial King of Nepal, though his actual assumption of office waits until the death of his father, Jayarajadeva, in 1361.
- May 8 – The Treaty of Brétigny is drafted by the Dauphin Charles of France and six English knights at the Hôtel de Sens, the Dauphin's residence, in Paris to set terms for the end of the ongoing war between the kingdoms of England and France.
- May 15 – The English Parliament opens at Westminster, but history does not record when it adjourned and what, if any legislation it enacted.
- June 7 – (8th waning of Nayon, 722 ME) In what is now Myanmar, the coronation of King Narathu the Pinya kingdom in the Mandalay Region of Myanmar. Narathu has reigned since March 19, 1359 after the death of his father, Kyawswa II.
- June 14 – King Jean II of France, who has been held as a prisoner of war in England since 1356, signs the Treaty of Brétigny at a banquet attended by England's King Edward III, Edward, Prince of Wales, and other French prisoners of war. Under the treaty, King Edward obtains 19 territories on the French mainland in return for renouncing any claims to the French throne, while King Jean obligates France to pay a ransom of 3,000,000 gold écu coins for the release of himself and the other French prisoners, with the condition that he will be allowed to return to France after the first one million écus is paid and send two of his sons to England as hostages, along with more than 40 French citizens.
- June 22 – Russian prince Dmitry Konstantinovich is installed by the Khan of the Golden Horde as the new Grand Prince of Vladimir.
- June 30 – King Jean II of France is released from the Tower of London after having been taken as a prisoner of war since 1356, and is feted with a farewell dinner at Eltham Palace, hosted by Queen consort Philippa, then begins his journey back to France.
- June –
  - Khiḍr Khan is enthroned as the Khan of the Golden Horde
  - Valdemar IV Atterdag attacks Skåne and conquers Lindholmen Castle.

=== July–September ===
- July 8 – King Jean II of France returns to the continent after four years as a prisoner of war in England, landing at Calais, in order to raise the 3,000,000 gold crown ransom owed to England under the terms of the Treaty of Brétigny. To take his place, Jean's son Louis I of Anjou boards the English ship to be held as a hostage in England.
- July 13 – (27 Shaban 761 AH) Sultan Ismail II of Granada is assassinated, less than a year after he ascended the throne on August 23, 1359. He is succeeded by Muhammad VI of the Nasrid dynasty.
- August 10 – Peace is concluded between Sweden and Denmark with the arbitration in Helsingborg. Magnus IV Eriksson cedes the Scanian lands except northern Halland to Denmark. In return, Valdemar IV Atterdag must help Magnus against his domestic enemies.
- September 26 – Philip of Rouvres, Duke of Burgundy, becomes the Count of Auvergne upon the death of his mother, the Queen consort Joan I of Auvergne.

=== October–December ===
- October 24 – The Treaty of Brétigny is ratified at Calais, marking the end of the first phase of the Hundred Years' War. Under its terms, Edward III of England gives up his claim to the French throne, and releases King John II of France in return for French land, including Calais and Gascony.
- November 20 – King Edward III summons the English Parliament, directing the members of the Lords and Commons to assemble at Westminster on January 24.
- December 5 – The French franc, worth one livre tournois and consisting of 3.73 grams of gold, is minted for the first time as the franc à cheval after King Jean of France returns from captivity, and is designed initially to paid the ransom of three million gold crowns owed by France to England. The franc will as France's monetary unit for the next 638 years until it is phased out in favor of the euro by the European Community on December 31, 1998.

=== Date unknown ===
- Red Turban Rebellions: Chen Youliang murders Xu Shouhui and proclaims himself the emperor of Han in Wuchang before unsuccessfully attempting to capture Nanjing from Zhu Yuanzhang.
- Shah Shuja regains rule of the Muzaffarid tribe in Persia after the death of his brother, Shah Mahmud.
- Earliest known Kırkpınar oil wrestling tournament in the Ottoman Empire, which will still be staged into the 21st century.

== Births ==
- January 8 – Ulrich von Jungingen, German Grand Master of the Teutonic Knights (d. 1410)
- March 31 – Philippa of Lancaster, queen consort of Portugal (d. 1415)
- May 2 – Yongle Emperor of China (d. 1424)
- June 24 – Nuno Álvares Pereira, Portuguese general (d. 1431)
- August 10 – Francesco Zabarella, Italian jurist (d. 1417)
- date unknown
  - Amadeus VII, Count of Savoy (d. 1391)
  - Bayezid I, sultan of the Ottoman Empire (d. 1403)
  - Giovanni di Bicci de' Medici, Italian banker, founder of the Medici dynasty of Florence (d. 1429)
  - Yi Chongmu, Korean general (d. 1425)
  - Andrei Rublev, Russian painter (d. 1430)
  - Stanislaw of Skarbimierz, Polish religious writer (d. 1431)

== Deaths ==
- February 26 – Roger Mortimer, 2nd Earl of March, English military leader (b. 1328)
- September 16 – William de Bohun, 1st Earl of Northampton (b. 1319)
- September 29 – Joanna I of Auvergne, queen consort of France (b. 1326)
- November 4 – Elizabeth de Clare, English noblewoman (b. 1295)
- December 26 – Thomas Holland, 1st Earl of Kent
- date unknown
  - David IX of Georgia, King of Georgia
  - Geoffrey the Baker, English chronicler
  - Isabella, Countess of Brienne, Countess of Lecce
  - Nicephorus Gregoras, Byzantine historian (b. 1295)
  - Xu Shouhui, Chinese rebel leader, emperor of Tianwan (b. 1320)
