= Kumbheshwar Temple =

Hindu temple in Nepal

- कुम्भेश्वर मन्दिर
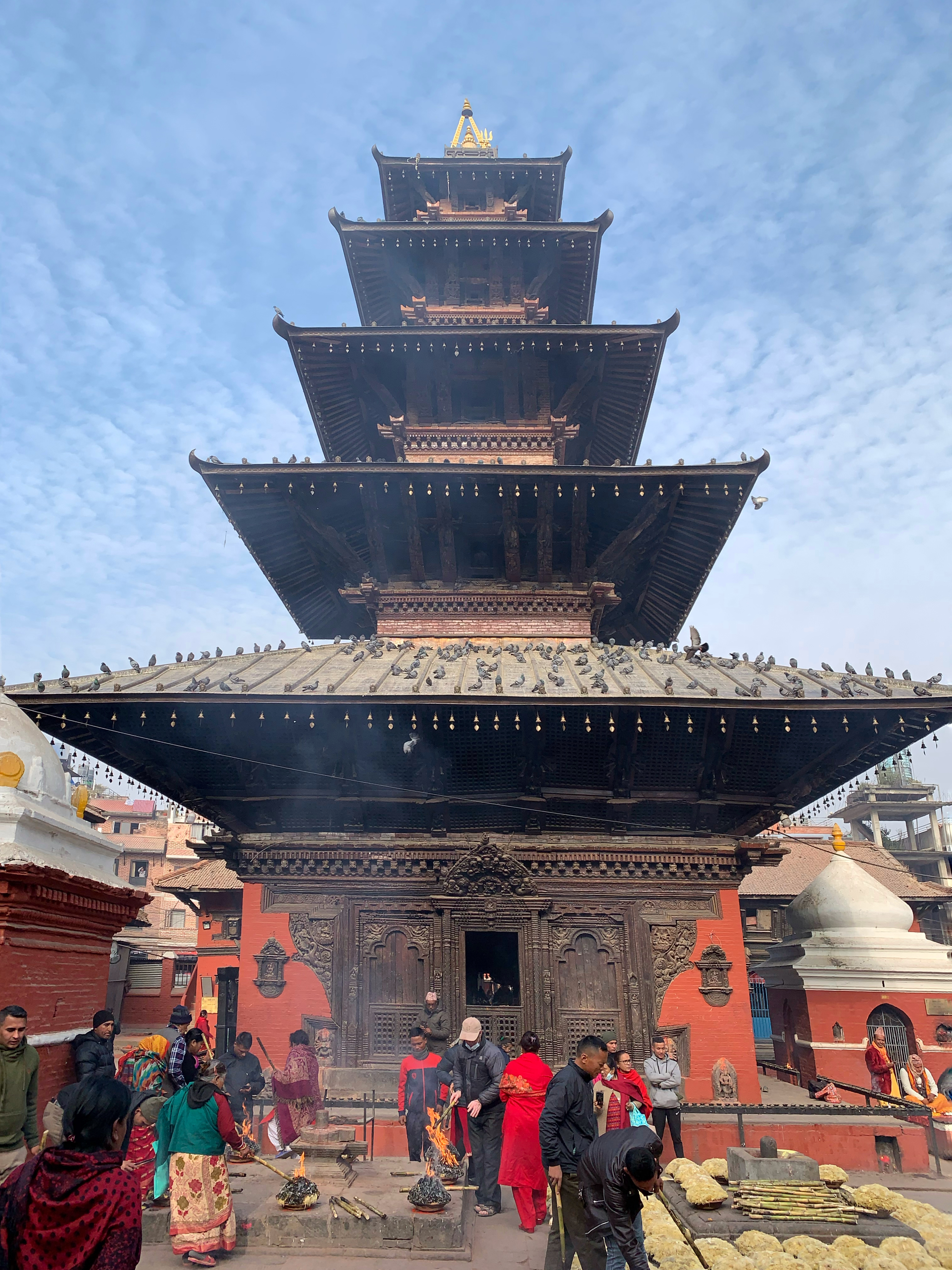

- Location in Kathmandu

Religion
- Affiliation: Hinduism
- District: Lalitpur
- Deity: Shiva
- Festivals: Janai Purnima, Shivaratri, Teej, Bala Chaturdashi etc.

Location
- Location: Kathmandu
- State: Bagmati
- Country: Nepal
- Interactive map of Kumbheshwar Temple
- Coordinates: 27°40′36″N 85°19′33″E

Architecture
- Type: Pagoda
- Creator: King Jayasthiti Malla
- Completed: 1392

Specifications
- Temple: 3
- Monument: 5

Kumbheshwar Temple (Nepali: कुम्भेश्वर मन्दिर) is one of the oldest Hindu temples, situated 200m from the northern part of Patan Durbar Square. It was built in the 14th century (around 1392) by King Jayasthiti Malla which makes it the oldest temple in Patan. It is one of the two free-standing, five-story temples, the other being the famous Nyatapola temple of Bhaktapur. The temple is noted for its graceful proportions and fine woodcarvings and is dedicated to Shiva, as indicated by the large Nandi, or bull, facing the temple.

== Temple complex ==
The Kumbheshwar Temple lies in a complex that includes many other structures, including Bagalamukhi (बगलामुखी मन्दिर), Ulmanta Bhairava (उल्मान्त भैरव) and two hiti ponds, among the most notable ones. It is a popular belief that the water spring that fills the ponds originates all the way from Gosainkunda, which is located 43 kilometers north of Kathmandu. So taking a dip in the pond during the festival of Janai Purnima (जनै पुर्णिमा) is equivalent to doing the same in Gosainkunda. Shiva’s mount, the bull Nandi is kneeling in front of the main Kumbheshwor Temple. High above the wooden roof tiers, it looks as if they might topple over on this five-story building.

== Gallery ==
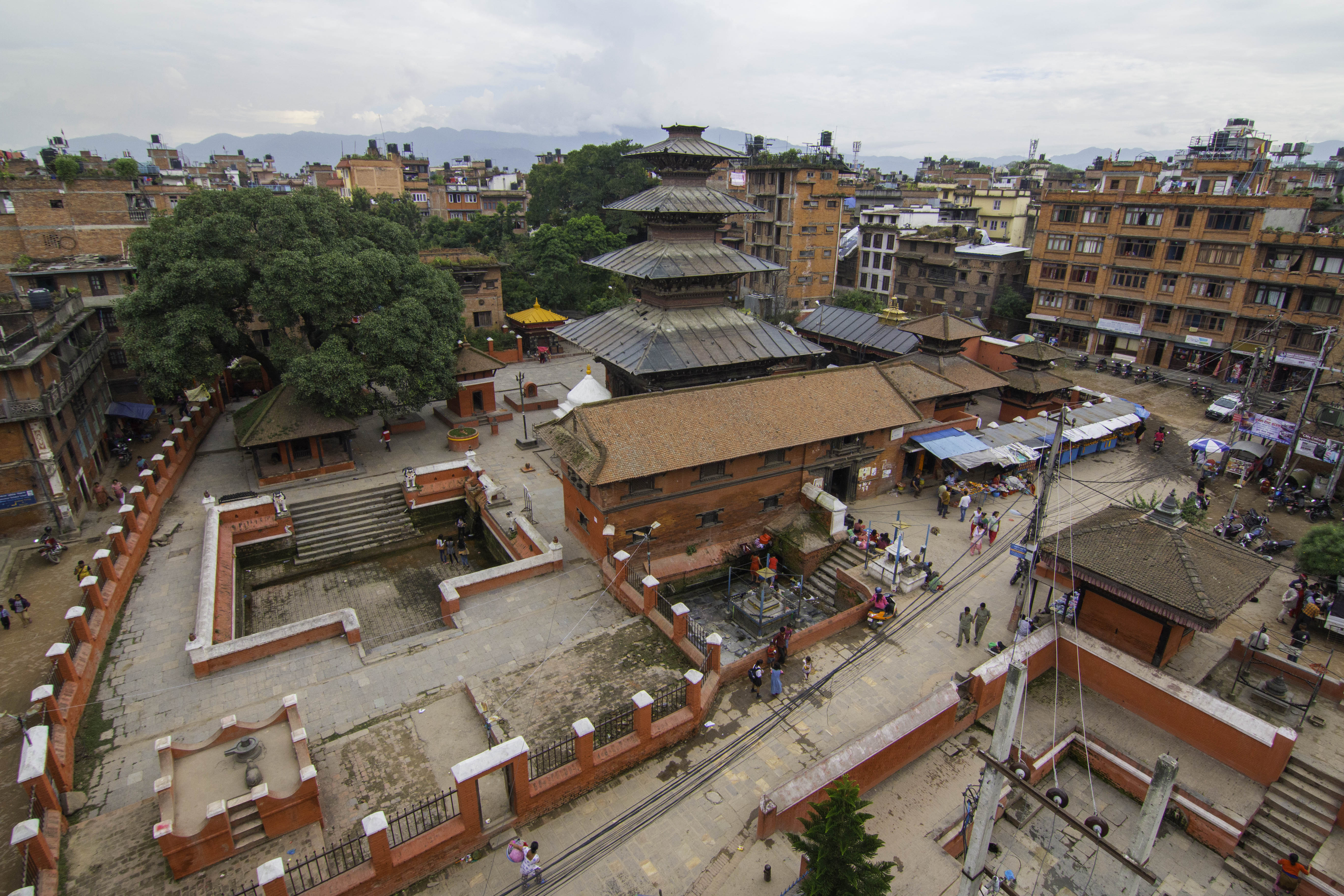
Temple with sattal, Misha Hiti, Konti Hiti and Kumbheshwar Pokhari

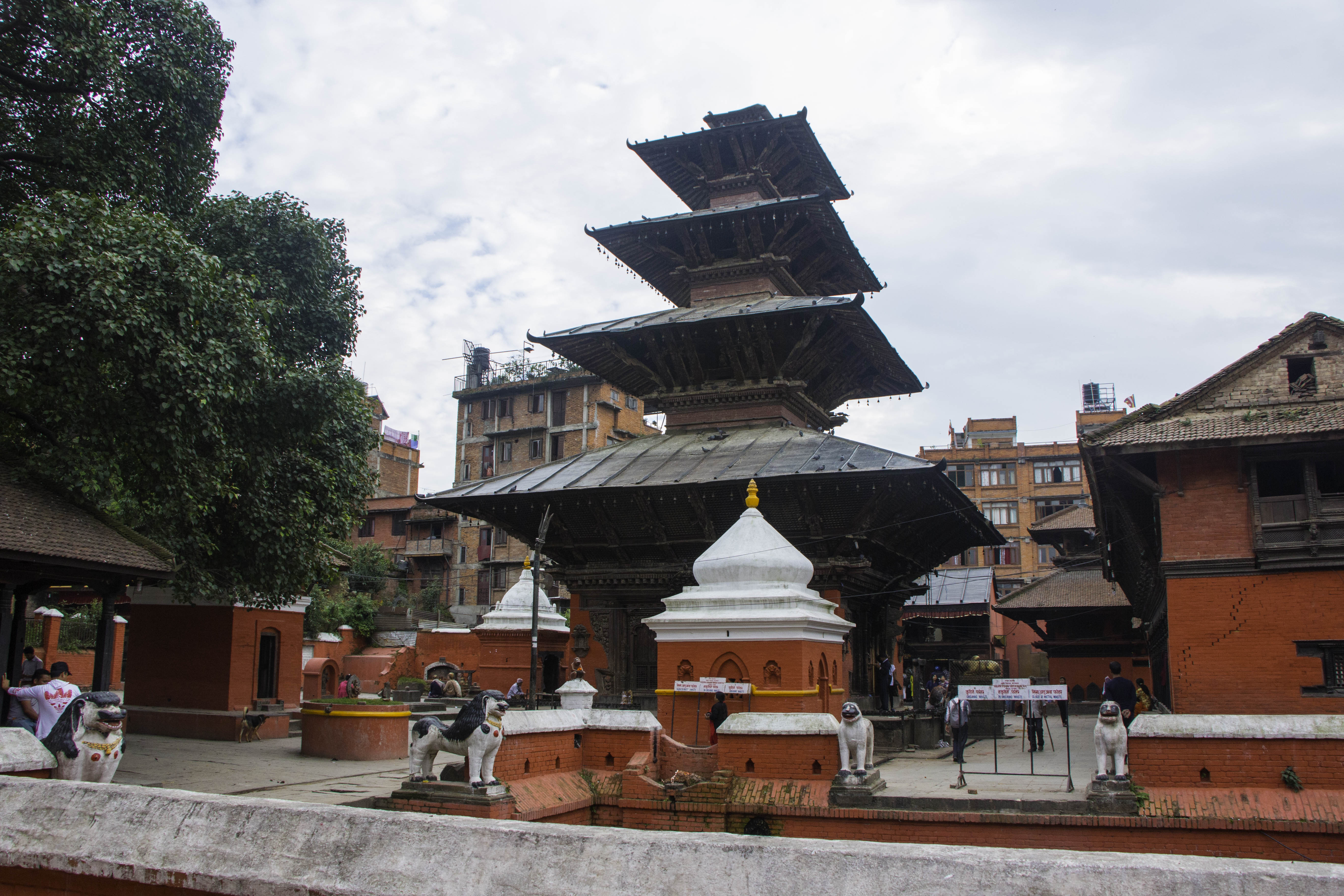
Five storey pagoda style Kumbheshwor Temple

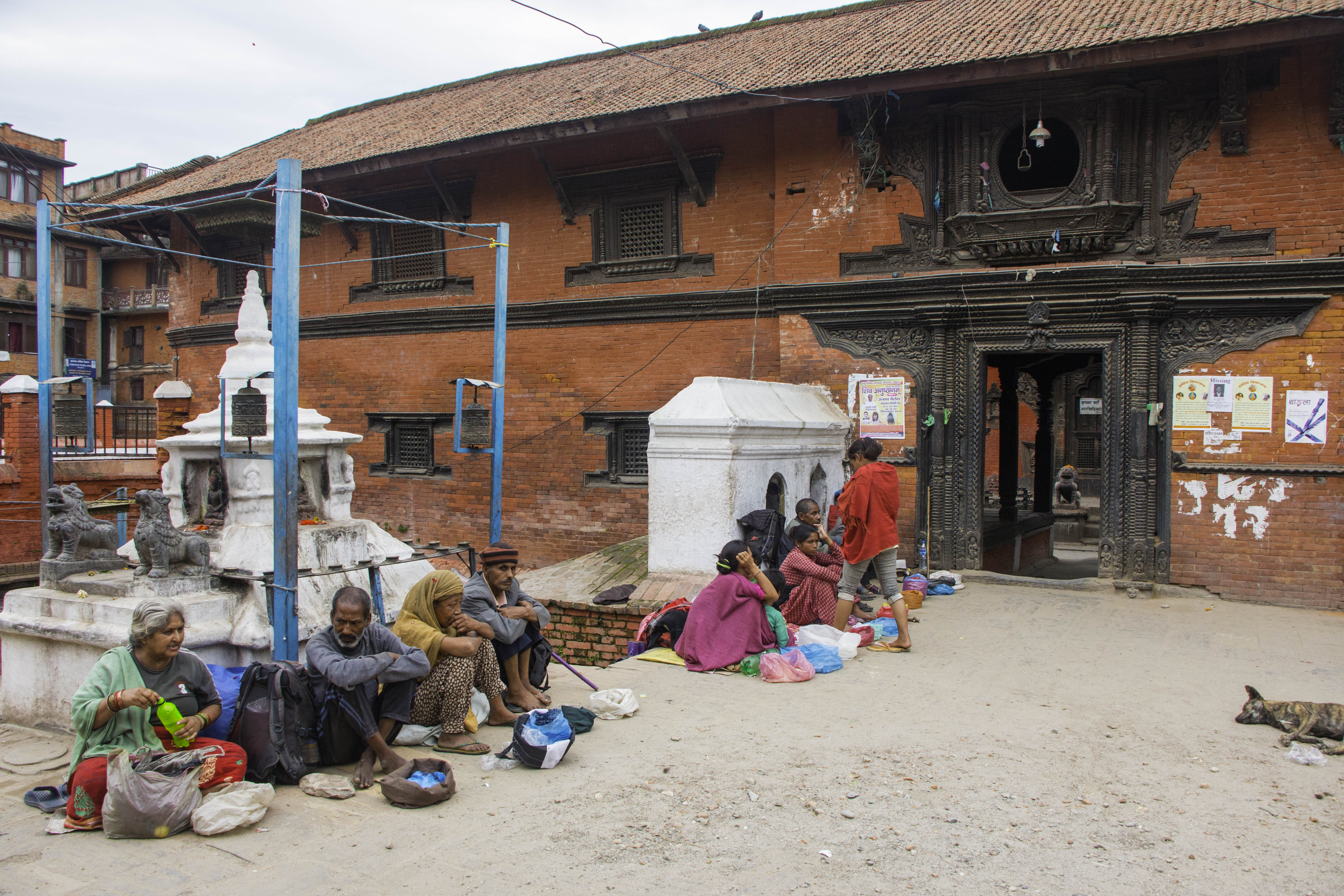
Sattal that serves as main entrance

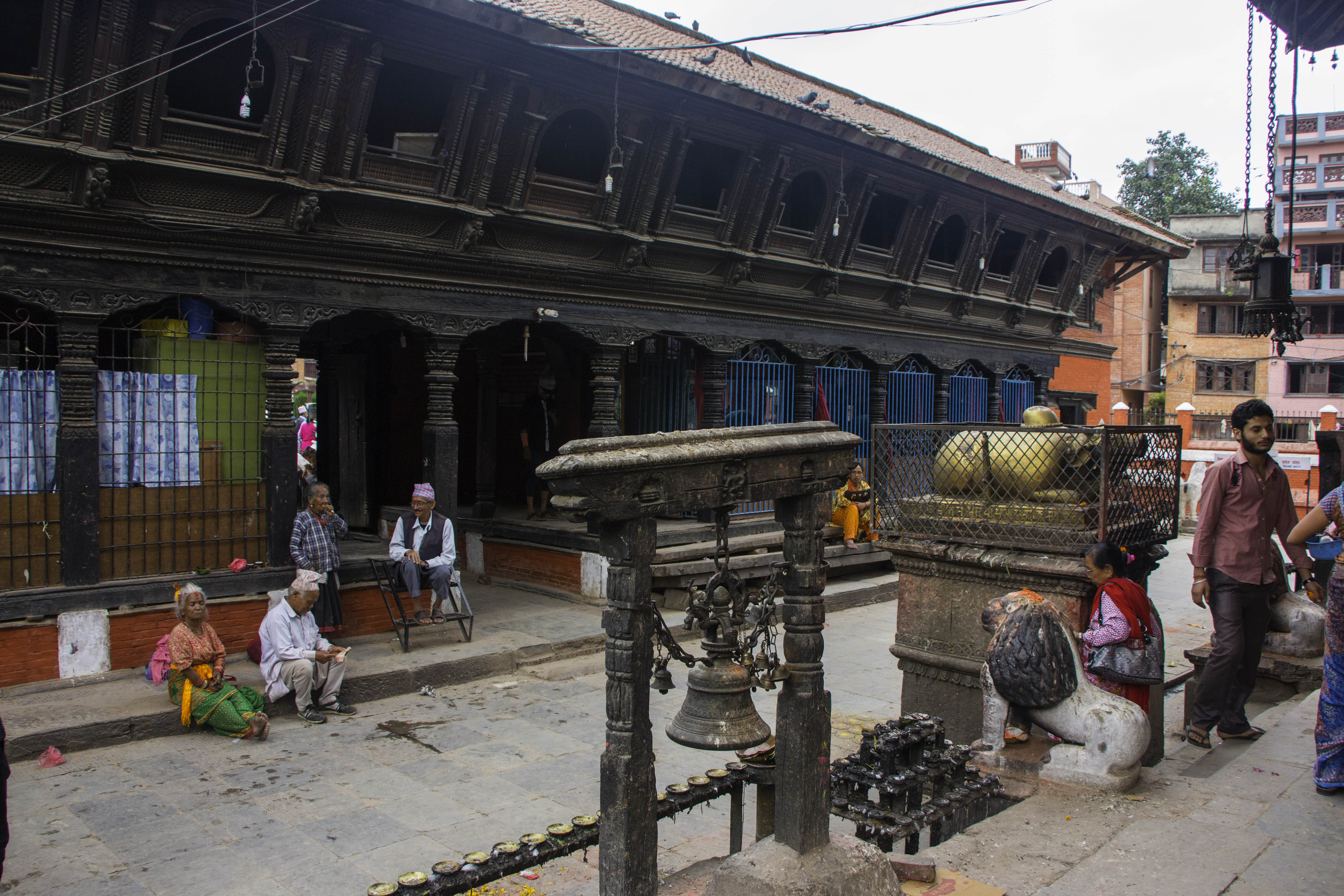
Sattal seen from the inside

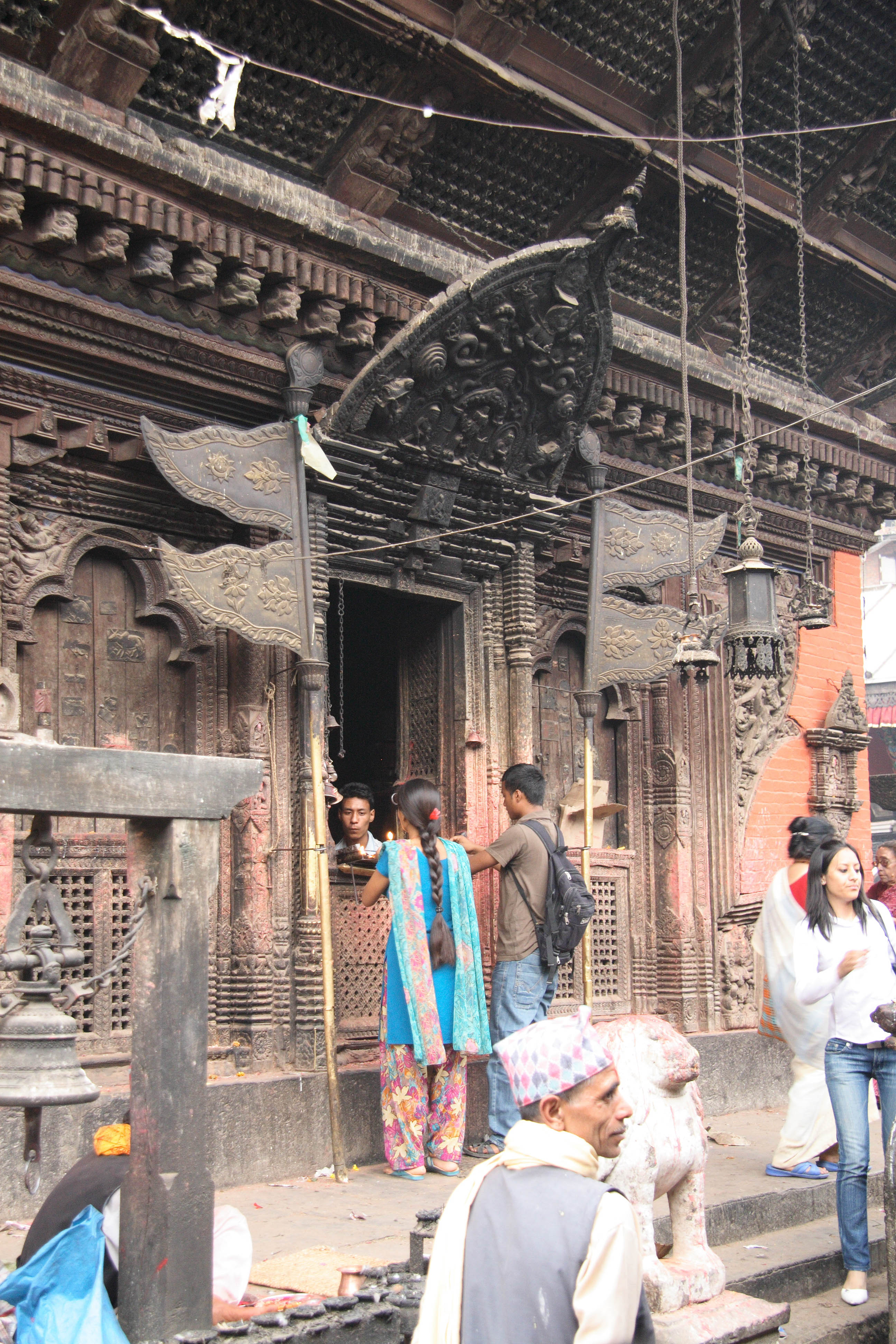
Temple door

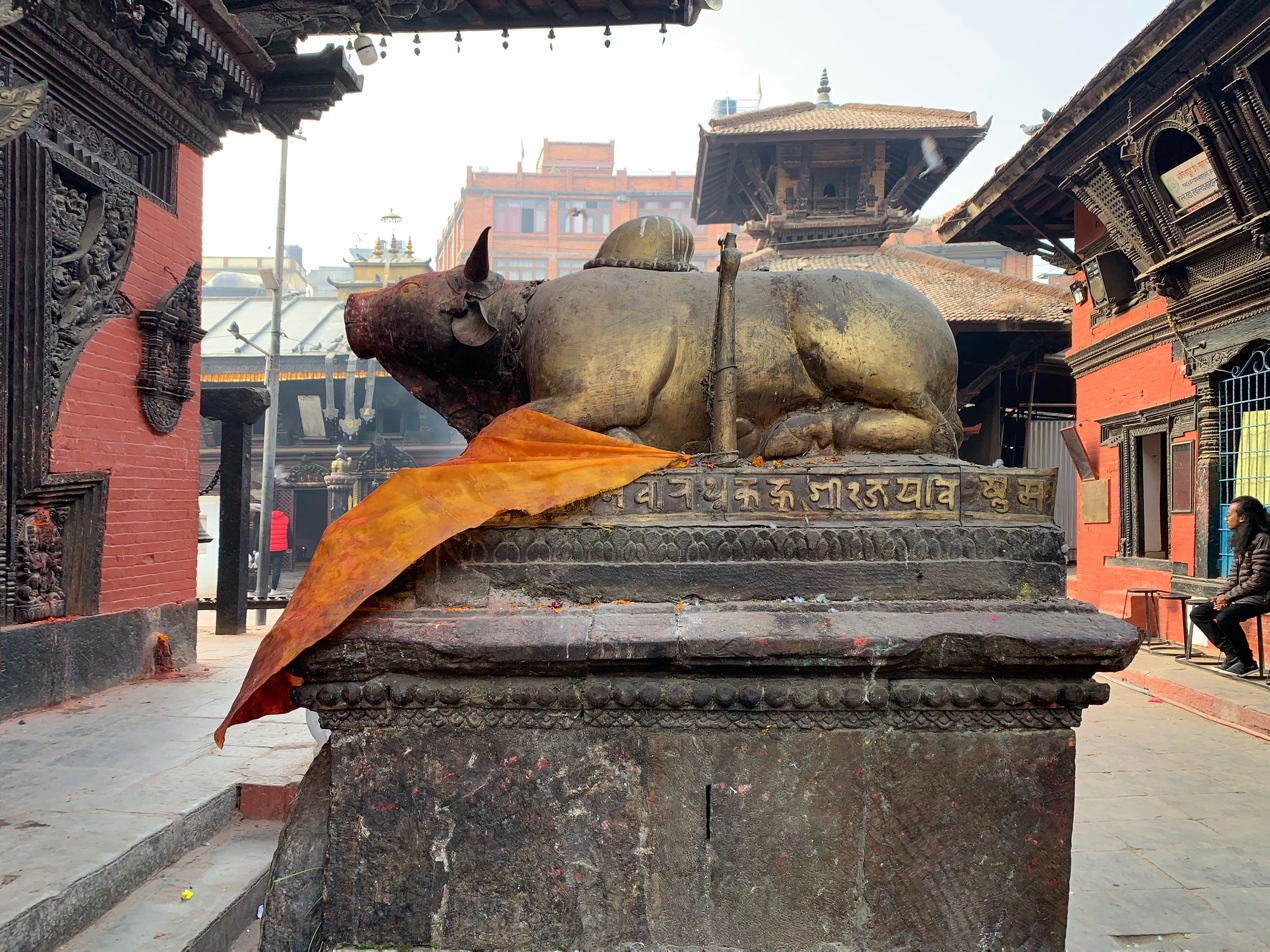
Nandi
