= Jayarjunadeva =

14th-century King of Kathmandu Valley

Jayarjunadev

King of Nepal
- Reign: 18 April 1360–23 November 1381
- Predecessor: Jayarajadeva
- Successor: Jayasthiti Malla
- Born: 2 February 1338; Nepal
- Died: 3 February 1382 (aged 44); Nepal
- Spouse: Sankaradevi
- Issue: Jayarjunadeva
- Dynasty: Malla
- Father: Jayarajadeva
- Mother: Rudramadevi

Jayarjunadeva (Newar: 𑐖𑐫𑐀𑐬𑑂𑐖𑐸𑐣𑐡𑐾𑐰), also known as Jayarjuna, was the son of Jayarajadeva and the tenth king of Nepal. Jayarjuna succeeded his father in 1360 and reigned until his deposition in 1381.

== Reign ==
Jayarjuna was proclaimed as the King in 1360, but his reign officially began after his father died in 1361. His control over his dominion as a king was even weaker than his predecessor's and it was respected only in Banepa. Although his sovereignty was recognized in Patan, the mahapatras were the ones with authority in Patan. The ceremonial suzerainty he had over Bhadgaon was fully rejected soon after he became king.

=== Rise of Jayasthiti Malla ===
The de facto head of the House of Tripura, and also of the valley, Devalakshmidevi, died in 1366 and the Tripuras fully came under the control of Rajalladevi—granddaughter of Devalakshmidevi, and the wife of Jayasthiti Malla. Jayasthiti started to gather political power by persuading courtiers while Jayarjuna and Jayasthiti maintained an intricate balance of power. Jayarjuna reigned as the monarch, with Jayasimha Rama as the prime minister, but Jayasthiti held significant control over the valley. The citizens of Bhadgaon treated Rajalladevi as their legitimate queen and did not recognize the authority of Jayarjuna.

In 1370, Jayasthiti Malla brought Patan to his side. Jayasimha Rama plotted a rebellion against Jayasthiti in order to curb the latter's growing influence. Jayasimha was imprisoned by Jayasthiti in 3 May 1372 and the aristocracy of Patan switched sides and marched towards Bhadgaon in an attempt to seize it. Jayasthiti Malla defeated the rebels and fifty-three prominent leaders of Patan were killed. The rebels then surrendered, and Jayasimha was also freed on 30 July.

Jayasimha Rama, under the command of Jayarjuna, again attempted to seize Bhadgaon and on 12 September 1374, another battle was fought. He was aided by Patan and the leaders of Pharping. Many nobles were taken prisoner by Jayasthiti Malla in that battle and subsequently his authority increased in the valley.

== Exile and succession ==
On 23 November 1381, Jayasthiti Malla, with the consent of Patan, exiled Jayarjuna to Banepa which excluded the latter from being involved in any sort of political activities in Kathmandu valley. Jayasthiti Malla then exercised his authority over the entire valley. Jayarjuna attempted to regain his control by returning to Gokarna and attacking Bhadgaon but Jayasthiti defeated and arrested him.

Jayarjuna died two years later on 3 February 1382, and without any male heirs, the House of Bhonta came to an end. Although already acting as a king, Jayasthiti Malla was officially crowned on 15 September 1382.

Preceded by Jayarajadeva	King of Nepal; 18 April 1360–23 November 1381	Succeeded by Jayasthiti Malla
