= Jayarajadeva =

14th-century King of Kathmandu Valley

King of Nepal
- Reign: 6 September 1348 – 1361
- Predecessor: Jayari Malla
- Successor: Jayarjunadeva
- Born: 9 March 1317
- Died: 1361 (aged 43–44); Nepal
- Issue: Jayarjunadeva
- Dynasty: Malla
- Father: Jayanandadeva

Jayarajadeva (Newar: 𑐖𑐫𑐬𑐵𑐖𑐡𑐾𑐰), also known as Jayaraja, was the ninth king of Nepal and an illegitimate son of Jayanandadeva. Jayaraja succeeded Jayari Malla and reigned as a powerless monarch from 1348 until his death in 1361.

== Reign ==
=== Background ===
Jayari Malla died in 1344 and left the throne vacant. A power struggle between the Bhonta House and Tripura House ensued. At that time, Devaladevi, the sister of Rudra Malla, was the de facto head of Tripura House. Devaladevi, with her newly gained support of the courtiers, made an agreement with the Bhonta House that a king would be installed from the Bhontas, while she would control the entire valley as a de facto ruler. Following this agreement, Jayarajadeva was crowned as king in 1348. However, Devaladevi was given titles higher than his.

=== Expansion of dominion ===
Jayaraja had a prime minister named Aneka Rama whose son, Jayasimha Rama, served as the attendant for the heir apparent Jayarjunadeva. Immediately after his ascension to the throne, Jayaraja, along with Aneka Rama, and Devaladevi brought Patan under the control of Nepal. They also annexed several villages including Kirtipur. The rulers then started to grow the national reserve treasury of Pashupatinath.

=== Bengal Invasion of 1349 ===
Shamsuddin Ilyas Shah of Bengal Sultanate invaded Nepal around November 1349 and wreaked havoc in the valley. He came to Nepal with around 20,000 men and destroyed the image of Pashupati in Pashupatinath temple. He then raided Patan for a week, damaged several statutes of gods, and also destroyed a stupa at Swayambhunath. The invaders did not stay for long and the valley gradually rebuilt itself up. The Ashoka Chaitya was repaired in 1357, the image on Pashupatinath temple was reinstalled by Jayasimha Rama in 1360 and the shrine of Swayambhunath was repaired in 1372.

=== Entry of Jayasthiti Malla ===
On 26 September 1354, Devalakshmidevi brought Jayasthiti Malla, a man of obscure but noble birth, from Tirhut and married him to her granddaughter and the head of House Tripura, Rajalladevi. Jayasthiti Malla would later reunite the whole of Kathmandu valley and bring it under his rule.

== Death ==
Jayaraja died in the beginning of 1361 having been burnt while asleep. He was succeeded by his son Jayarjunadeva following the prior agreement of 1348.

Preceded by Jayari Malla	King of Nepal; 6 September 1348–1361	Succeeded by Jayarjunadeva
