= Bhuwana Malla =

16th-century King of Bhaktapur

King of Bhaktapur
- Reign: 1505–1519
- Predecessor: Raya Malla
- Successor: Prana Malla
- Born: Bhaktapur
- Died: 1519
- Issue: Prana Malla; Jita Malla; Bira Malla; Devakidevi
- Dynasty: Malla
- Father: Jayayakshya Malla

Bhuwana Malla (Newar: 𑐨𑐸𑐰𑐣 𑐩𑐮𑑂𑐮), also known as Subarna Malla (𑐳𑐸𑐰𑐬𑑂𑐞 𑐩𑐮𑑂𑐮), was a Malla Dynasty king and the second King of Bhaktapur after the division of Kathmandu Valley. He reigned from 1505 until his death in 1519.

== Life ==
Bhuwana Malla was the son of Raya Malla, and the grandson of Yakshya Malla. After the division of Kathmandu Valley upon the death of Yakshya Malla, Banepa came to be ruled separately by Rana Malla, the third son of Yakshya Malla. Raya Malla died in 1505 when Bhuwana Malla was still in his early age. Rana Malla came to Bhadgaon to assist his nephew in ruling the kingdom. Rana Malla died while his son was a child and Bhuwana Malla annexed Banepa into Bhadgaon.

During Bhuwana Malla's reign in 1513, a severe famine overtook Bhadgaun, forcing many of its inhabitants to migrate to other regions.

== Succession ==
Bhuwana Malla died around 1519 and was succeeded by the joint rule of his sons until around 1534. Prana Malla then ruled Bhadgaon on his own.

Preceded by Raya Malla	King of Bhadgaon; 1505–1519	Succeeded by Prana Malla
