= Prana Malla =

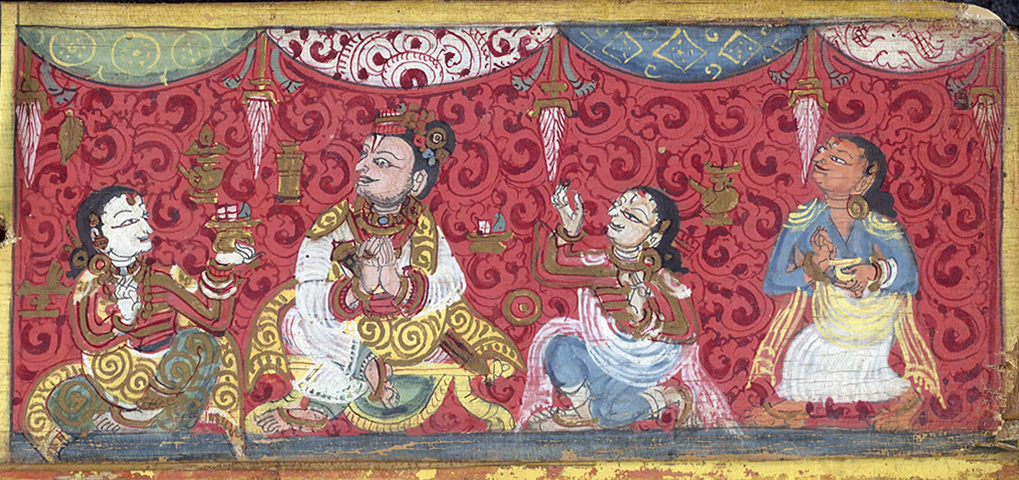
- Prana Malla with his wives and concubines, dated 1549.

King of Bhaktapur
- Reign: 1519-1547
- Predecessor: Bhuwana Malla
- Successor: Vishva Malla
- Born: 1519; Bhaktapur, Nepal
- Died: 26 November 1548 (aged 28–29); Bhaktapur, Nepal
- Spouse: Raju Laksmi; Ketaki Laksmi; Sakti Laksmi
Names
- Jayaprana Malla
- Dynasty: Malla
- Father: Subarna Malla
- Mother: Rukmini Devi

Prana Malla (Newar: 𑐥𑑂𑐬𑐵𑐞 𑐩𑐮𑑂𑐮) was a Malla Dynasty King of Bhaktapur, Nepal from 1519 to 1547. Unlike many of the other Malla rulers, there is little evidence that this king was particularly active in construction developments in the Durbar Square in Bhaktapur.

His wives were named Raju Laksmi, Ketaki Laksmi, Sakti Laksmi and Udaya Laksmi. His death occurred on NS 669 Kartika vadi 1, translating to 26 November 1548.
