= Surya Malla =

16th-century King of Kantipur

King of Kantipur
- Reign: 1520-1530
- Predecessor: Ratna Malla
- Successor: Amara Malla
- Born: Nepal
- Died: 1530; Nepal
- Dynasty: Malla
- Father: Ratna Malla

Surya Malla (Newar: 𑐳𑐸𑐬𑑂𑐫 𑐩𑐮𑑂𑐮) was a king of the Malla dynasty and the second king of Kantipur. He succeeded his father Ratna Malla and ruled from 1520 to 1530.

== Reign ==
According to the Bhāsāvamsävali and Padmagiri's Vamsävali, he captured Sankhu and made it his capital. In 1526, Mukunda Sen of Palpa attacked the entire Kathmandu valley and at one time had surrounded both Kantipur, and Patan.

Surya Malla died in 1530 and was succeeded by his son Amara Malla.

| Preceded by Ratna Malla | King of Kantipur; 1520–1530 | Succeeded by Amara Malla |
