= Jayari Malla =

King of Kathmandu Valley (1276–1344)

King of Nepal
- Reign: 5 April 1320 – 14 September 1344
- Predecessor: Jayanandadeva
- Successor: Jayarajadeva
- Born: 29 January 1276
- Died: 14 September 1344 (aged 68); Nepal
- Dynasty: Malla
- Father: Ananta Malla

Jayari Malla (Newar: 𑐖𑐫𑐵𑐬𑐷 𑐩𑐮𑑂𑐮), also known as Ari Malla II, was a son of Ananta Malla and the eighth king of Nepal. Jayari succeeded Jayanandadeva and reigned as a powerless monarch from 1320 to 1344.

== Reign ==
=== Background ===
After the death of Ananta Malla in 1308, Rudra Malla, the de facto ruler of the valley, had installed Jayanandadeva of Bhonta House as king. In 1320, Rudra Malla withdrew support for Jayananda and deposed him. He installed Jayari Malla as the King in the same year. Jayari Malla exercised no real power and Rudra Malla was the ruling figure in the valley. The chronicles state that Jayari Malla ruled over the religious domain of the kingdom while Rudra Malla exercised complete sovereignty over the kingdom.

=== Refugees from Tirhut ===
Around 1324, the Karnat kingdom was invaded by Ghiyath al-Din Tughluq, the king of Delhi Sultanate. Harisimhadeva, along with his wife Devalakshmidevi and son Jagatsimha fled towards Kathmandu valley as refugees. Harisimha died in 1326 before reaching the valley, and his relatives were kept as prisoners for some time by the local lords. Devalakshmi and her son, Jagatsimha, were eventually welcomed into Bhadgaon by her brother, Rudra Malla. Rudra Malla died on 16 June 1326 without any male heir and his daughter Nayakadevi became the head of Bhonta House.

=== Khasa invasions ===
On 18 February 1328, Aditya Malla of the Khasa kingdom invaded the Kathmandu valley. He annexed Nuwakot and tried to seize Patan for almost a month. He burnt down castles and imposed fines upon the resident of Patan.

On 6 September 1334, Punya Malla, another Khasa king, entered Patan and killed forty men. He completely burnt the town of Sankhu, imposed fines upon the citizens and left the valley on March of the following year.

=== Rise of Devaladevi ===
The Tripura House de facto ruled the kingdom and its head Nayakadevi had married Harischandra, a refugee from Kashi. Soon after in 1335, Harishchandra was poisoned by the nobles. Nayakadevi married Jagatsimha, who was her cousin and the son of Devaladevi and Harisimhadeva. Devaladevi then gathered the support of nobles and killed the ones opposing her. She later acted as the de facto ruler of the valley.

== Succession ==
Jayari Malla died in 1344 leaving the throne vacant. After three years of his death in 1347, Devaladevi made an agreement with the Bhonta House such that a king would be from the Bhonta House, while the de facto control of the valley would remain with the House of Tripura. Jayarajadeva was crowned as the king following the agreement on 27 July 1347.

Preceded by Jayanandadeva	King of Nepal; 5 April 1320–14 September 1344	Succeeded by Jayarajadeva
