= Amara Malla =

16th-century King of Kantipur

King of Kantipur
- Reign: 1530-1560
- Predecessor: Surya Malla
- Successor: Mahendra Malla
- Died: 1560; Nepal
- Issue: Mahendra Malla
- Dynasty: Malla
- Father: Surya Malla

Amara Malla (Newar: 𑐀𑐩𑐬 𑐩𑐮𑑂𑐮), also known as Narendra Malla (𑐣𑐬𑐾𑐣𑑂𑐡𑑂𑐬 𑐩𑐮𑑂𑐮), was a king of the Malla dynasty and the third king of Kantipur. He succeeded his father Surya Malla and ruled from 1530 to 1560. During his reign, as well as many Jatra festivals, including Hari Siddhi Jatra, he instituted a dance for the goddess Mahalaksmi and the Rudrayani Temple at Khokana. He was succeeded by his son Mahendra Malla.

== Life ==
Also known as Narendra Malla, Amara Malla was the son of Surya Malla, the second ruler of the Kingdom of Kantipur. He was a member of the Malla dynasty, descended from the first Malla ruler in Nepal, Arideva Malla, the name 'Malla' being derived from a word that means 'wrestler'. His grandfather, Ratna Malla, was the founder of the Kingdom of Kantipur.

Amara ascended to the throne on the death of his father in 1530. A religious monarch, as well as patronising the dance of the goddess Harisiddhi, he instituted a dance for the goddess Mahalaksmi in Khokana. He also started numerous festivals known as Jatras across the kingdom, including Halchowk Devi Jatra, Hari Siddhi Jatra, Kankeshwari Jatra, Khokhana Jatra and Trisuli Jatra. The Rudrayani Temple in Khokana was constructed during his reign. He annexed to his kingdom the villages of Gokarna, Harisiddhi, Halchowk, Phaping, Khokana, Kirtipur, Thankot and Tokha.

He died in 1560 and was succeeded by his son Mahendra Malla.

== Sources ==
- Hasrat, Bikrama Jit; Williams, Donovan (1971). History of Nepal: As Told by Its Own and Contemporary Chroniclers. Hoshiarpur, Punjab: V.V. Research Institute Book Agency. OCLC 250738913.
- Shaha, Rishikesh (1992). Ancient and Medieval Nepal (PDF). New Delhi: Manohar Publications. ISBN 978-8-18542-569-6.
- Vergati, Anne (2000). Gods And Masks Of The Kathmandu Valley. New Delhi: D.K. Printworld. ISBN 978-8-12460-121-1.
- Shrestha, D. B.; Singh, C. B. (1972). The History of Ancient and Medieval Nepal (PDF). Katmandu: HMG Press. OCLC 499415812.

Preceded by Surya Malla	King of Kantipur; 1530–1560	Succeeded by Mahendra Malla
