= Lakh Batti =

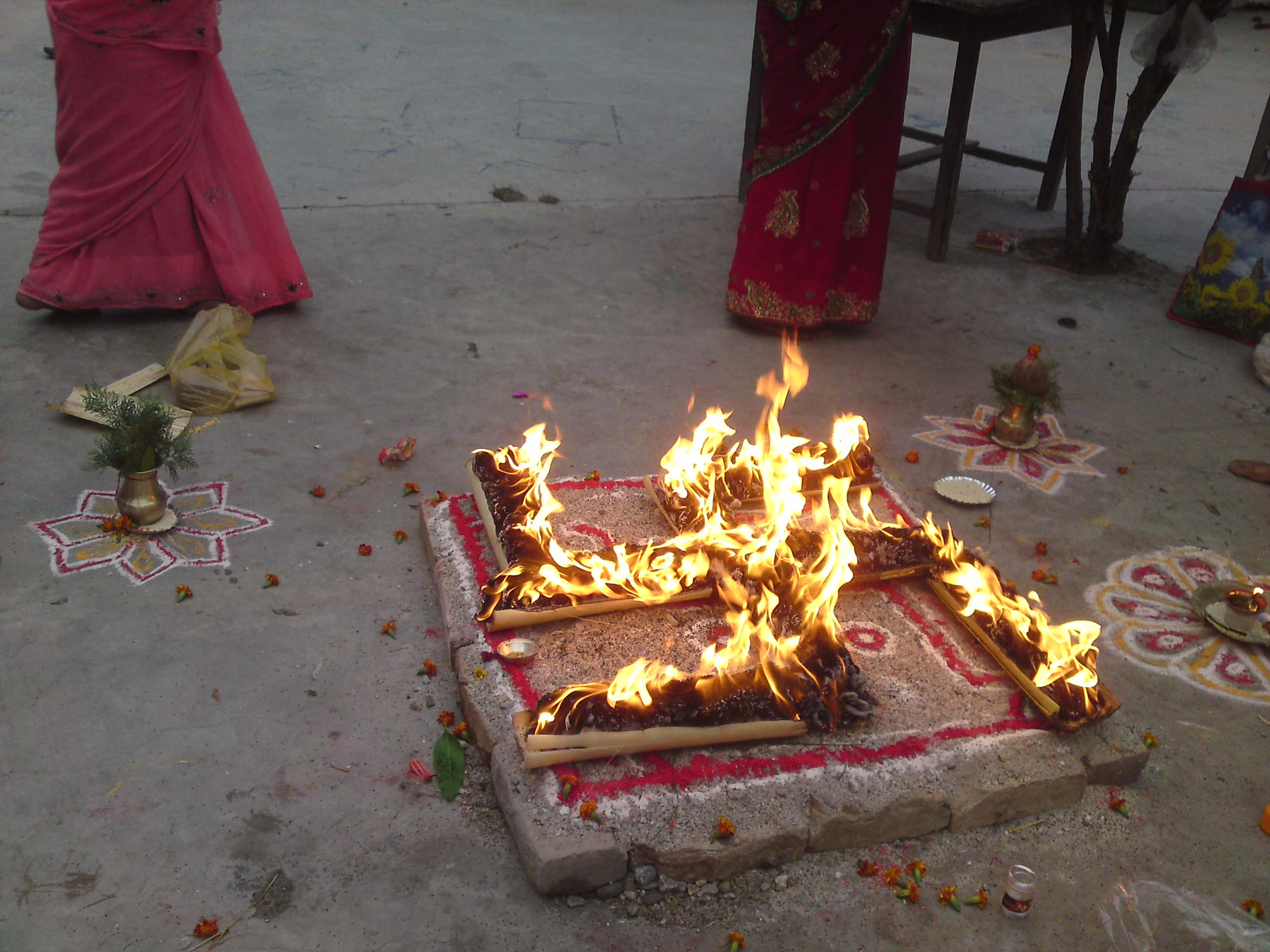
Burning of Lakh Batti in temple

Lighting a Lakh Batti(Devnagari:लाख बत्ती) is a Hindu tradition performed by the devotees wishing to get their wishes fulfilled by any deity of their choice. The devotee can pledge to light Lakh Batti literally meaning 100,000 lamps. Lakh batti is also lit on the end day of reciting Purana or other religious ceremony. In Nepal, it is also performed by Buddhists.

During the ritual, 100,000 wicks are soaked in oil a day prior to the ceremony. Generally ghee or sesame/mustard oil is used for soaking. On the day of ceremony, a qualified priest performs the Karmakanda (or rituals) before lighting the wicks. As the wicks burn, the host's family, relatives and public crowd in the temple moves around the burning pot to light it properly. They also show their palm in the light and place the palms back to their eyes. Brahmans, including one vijnya (expert) are fed at the end of the ritual.

It is believed that the best months to perform the ceremony is Kartik, Magh and Baisakh.

== Mythology ==
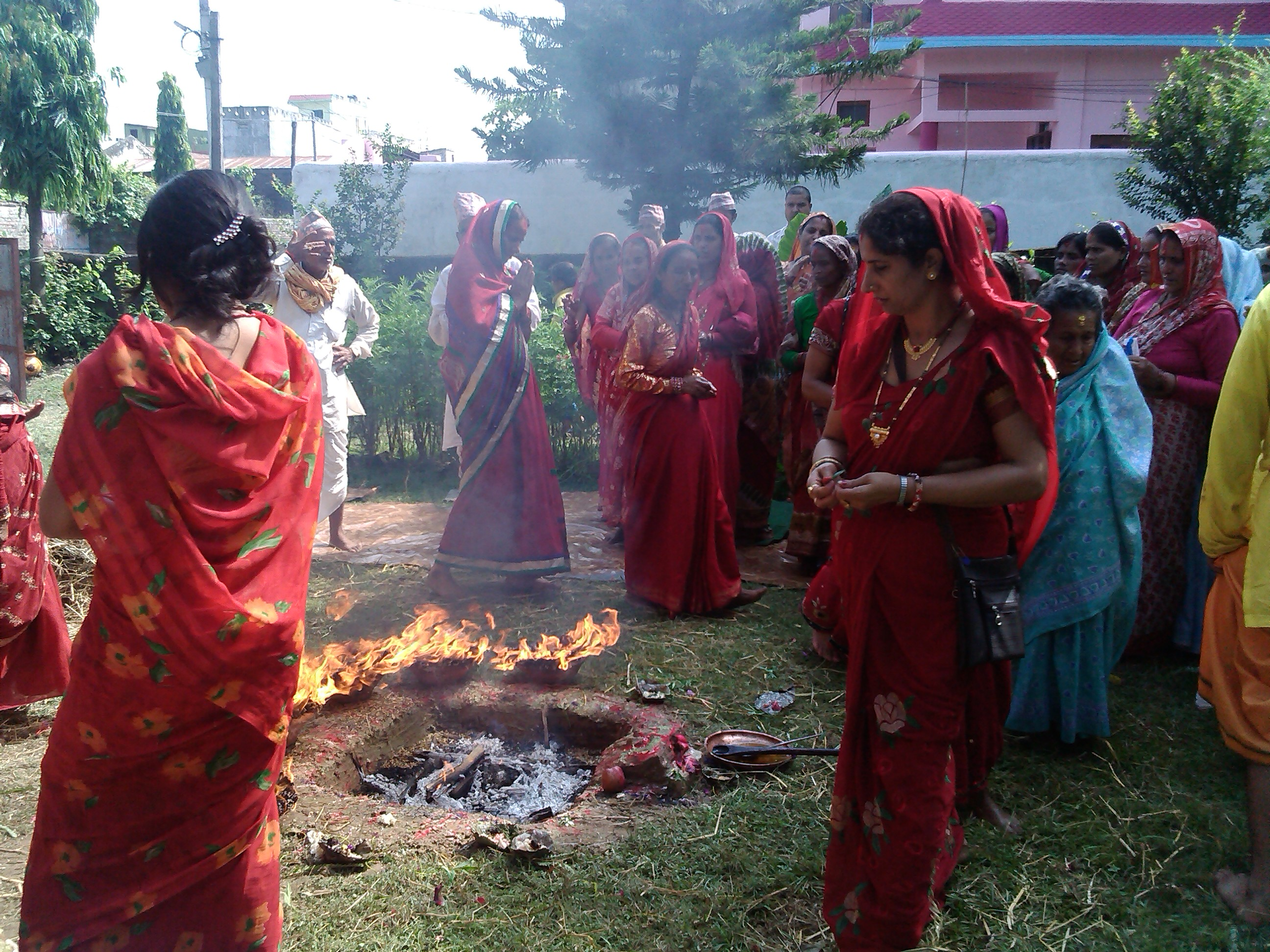
Devotees moving around the Lakh Batti

According to one legend, an upper caste female named Laxmana, marries a lower caste male called Bhujanga soon after her husband dies to get support for survival. Laxmana, however, later feels guilt for not keeping her widow's chastity. On one occasion, she meets a hermit called Yajaka and asks him the way to atone her transgression. The hermit tells her to perform a Lakh Batti rituals to cleanses her karmic blemishes.
