= Kingdom of Bhaktapur =

Kingdom in Medieval Nepal

Kingdom of Bhaktapur 𑐏𑑂𑐰𑐥 𑐡𑐾𑐱 (Newar)
- 1428–1769
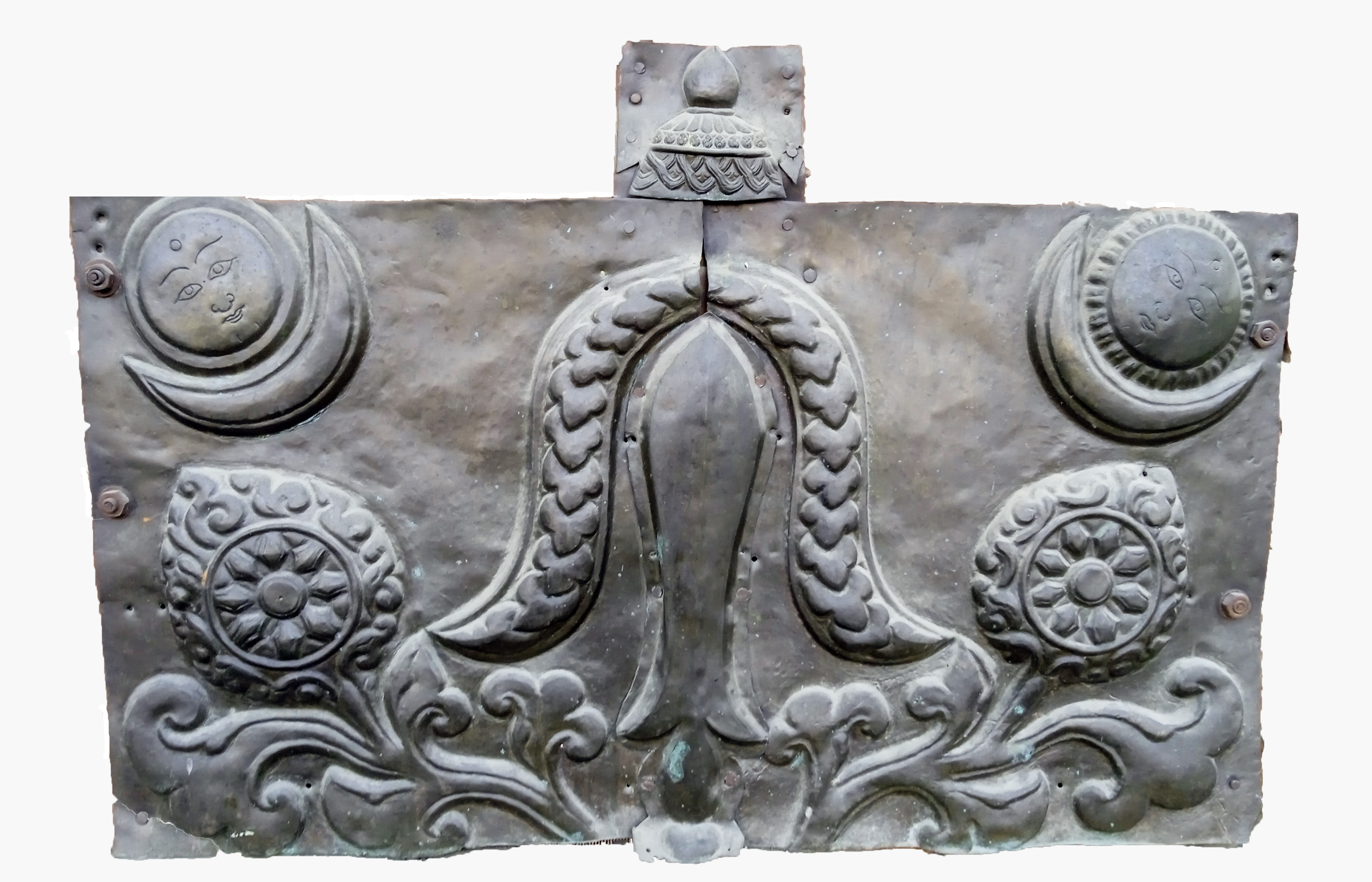
- Insignia of the Kingdom of Bhaktapur
- Capital: Bhaktapur Durbar Square, Bhaktapur
- Common languages: Newar (official); Sanskrit (religious)
- Religion: Newar Hinduism and Newar Buddhism
- Government: Monarchy
- History
  - Established: 1428
  - Gorkha conquest: 1769
- Currency: Mohar
Preceded by	Succeeded by
Malla dynasty (Nepal)	Kingdom of Nepal
- Today part of: Nepal

The Kingdom of Bhaktapur (Nepali: भक्तपुर राज्य, Bhaktapura Rājya), also known as Bhadgaon, was a kingdom ruled by the Malla dynasty of Nepal from 15th century until its annexation in the 18th century. It was established in 1482 after King Yaksha Malla died and his sons divided the valley into four kingdoms: Bhaktapur, Kantipur, Patan, and Banepa. Banepa, however, was soon annexed by or submitted itself to Bhaktapur.

In 1769, It became part of the Gorkha Kingdom―present day Kingdom of Nepal―after an aggressive unification campaign launched by Prithvi Narayan Shah.

== History ==
Since the reign of the first Malla king, Arimalla, over Kathmandu Valley, Bhadgaon had always been at the center of political events. After the lineage of Arimalla ended with Jayadeva Malla in 1258, it was the residence of House of Tripura. The Tripura House, along with its main rival from Banepa, the House of Bhonta played a prominent part in shaping the valley as it stood at that time. Eventually, the Bhonta House declined and Tripuras enjoyed full authority in the valley.

In 1353, Jayasthiti Malla, was brought from the south by Devaladevi, the de facto head of Tripura House, and she married him to Rajalladevi, her granddaughter. Yakshya Malla was the grandson of Jayasthiti, and all the later rulers of the valley descended from him.

== Monarchs ==
The following table provides a list of monarchs of Bhadgaon with their regnal dates.

Name	Reign
Raya Malla	1482–1509
Bhuwana Malla	1505–1519
Prana Malla	1519–1547
Vishva Malla	1547–1560
Trailokya Malla	1560–1613
Tribhuvana Malla	co-ruler of Trailokya
Ganga Rani	co-ruler of Trailokya
Jagajjyoti Malla	1613–1637
Naresha Malla	1637–1644
Jagat Prakasha Malla	1644–1673
Jitamitra Malla	1673–1696
Bhupatindra Malla	1696–1722
Ranajit Malla	1722–1769
