= Jayajyotir Malla =

15th-century King of Kathmandu Valley

King of Nepal
- Reign: 1408–1428
- Predecessor: Jayadharma Malla
- Successor: Yakshya Malla
- Born: 1373; Nepal
- Died: 1428 (aged 54–55); Nepal
- Issue: Yakshya Malla
- Dynasty: Malla
- Father: Jayasthiti Malla

Jayajyotir Malla (Newar: 𑐖𑐫𑐖𑑂𑐫𑑀𑐟𑐶𑐬 𑐩𑐮𑑂𑐮), often named Jyoti Malla (𑐖𑑂𑐫𑑀𑐟𑐶 𑐩𑐮𑑂𑐮) for short, was the son of Jayasthiti Malla and the thirteenth Malla king of Nepal. He succeeded his brother Jayadharma Malla in 1408 and reigned until his death in 1428.

== Reign ==
It is believed that Jayajyotir's reign co-existed with his two brothers' after the death of his father in 1395. His elder brother, Jayadharma was given the full royal titles in Kathmandu, and Patan, while all three brothers were the joint rulers in Bhadgaon. Among the three brothers, Jyoti Malla lived the longest, and eventually assumed the title of King of the whole Kathmandu valley in 1408. He was succeeded by his son Yakshya Malla in 1428.

Preceded by Jayadharma Malla	King of Nepal; 1408–1428	Succeeded by Yakshya Malla
