= Jayadharma Malla =

15th-century King of Kathmandu Valley

King of Nepal
- Reign: 1395–1408
- Predecessor: Jayasthiti Malla
- Successor: Jayajyotir Malla
- Born: 1367; Nepal
- Died: 1408 (aged 40–41); Nepal
- Dynasty: Malla
- Father: Jayasthiti Malla

Jayadharma Malla (Newar: 𑐖𑐫𑐢𑐬𑑂𑐩 𑐩𑐮𑑂𑐮) was the son of Jayasthiti Malla and the twelfth Malla king of Nepal.

== Reign ==
His reign co-existed with that of his brothers Jayajyotir Malla, and Jayakiti Malla in Bhadgaon, while Jayadharma Malla was the sole king of Patan and Kathmandu. He was succeeded by his brother Jayajyotir Malla as the sole ruler of Kathmandu valley after his death in 1408.

Preceded by Jayasthiti Malla	King of Nepal; 1395–1408	Succeeded by Jayajyotir Malla
