= Ratna Malla =

15th-century King of Kantipur

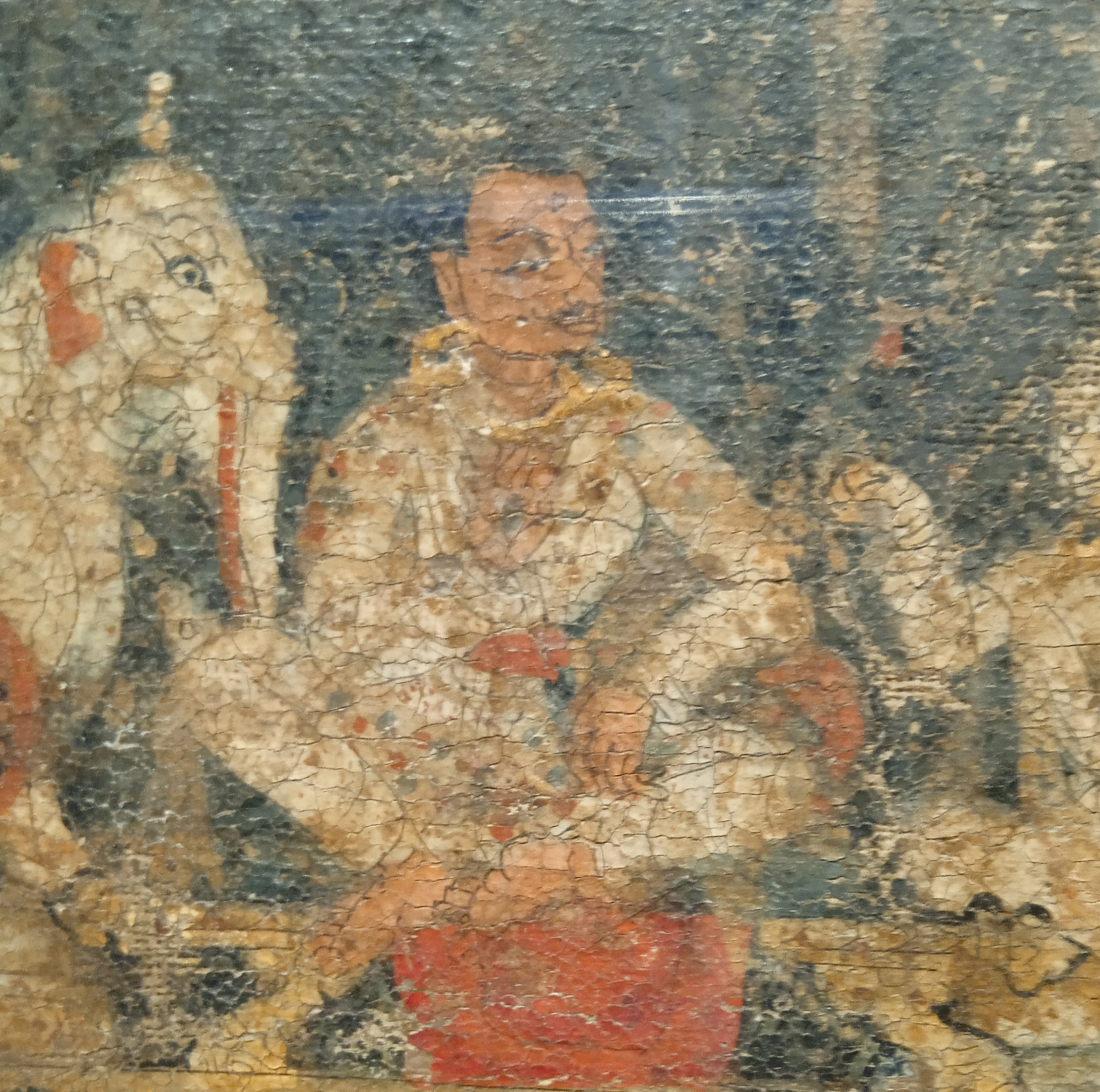
- Miniature of Ratna Malla from a Paubha located at the Bhaktapur Museum

King of Kantipur
- Reign: 1482–1520
- Predecessor: Yakshya Malla (as the King of Nepal)
- Successor: Surya Malla
- Born: Nepal
- Died: 1520; Nepal
- Issue: Surya Malla
- Dynasty: Malla
- Father: Yakshya Malla

Ratna Malla (Newar: 𑐬𑐟𑑂𑐣 𑐩𑐮𑑂𑐮) was a Malla king and the first independent king of Kantipur. He was one of the six sons of Yakshya Malla.

== Reign ==
On the death of his father in 1482, he and his brothers attempted to rule collegially. However, Ratna Malla decided to become an independent ruler and created the Kingdom of Kantipur, with its capital in Kathmandu, in 1484. He was the first Nepalese king to invite Kashmiri Muslim traders to Kathmandu. His elder brother, Raya Malla, was the King of Bhaktapur.

Ratna Malla also ruled over Patan for some time and suppressed the rebellion of Thakuri feudatories, and Bhotia with the help of Kingdom of Palpa. It was during Ratna Malla's rule that the priests from Mithila, and South India started to become prominent in court affairs which was usually the place of Hindu and Buddhist priests. He circulated copper coins using the local copper mines in present-day Chitlang.

He ruled for 38 years and was succeeded by his son Surya Malla in 1520 after his death.

Preceded by Yakshya Malla	King of Kantipur; 1484–1520	Succeeded by Surya Malla
