= Raya Malla =

15th/16th-century King of Bhaktapur

King of Bhaktapur
- Reign: 1482–1505
- Predecessor: Yakshya Malla (as the King of Kathmandu Valley)
- Successor: Bhuwana Malla
- Born: Nepal
- Died: 1505
- Dynasty: Malla
- Father: Jayayakshya Malla

Raya Malla (Newar: 𑐬𑐵𑐫 𑐩𑐮𑑂𑐮) was a Malla Dynasty king and the first King of Bhaktapur after the division of Kathmandu Valley into Kantipur, Patan, and Bhadgaon following the death of his father Jayayakshya Malla. He reigned from 1482 until his death in 1505. His younger brother, Ratna Malla, ruled over Kantipur.

== Reign ==
During his reign, the Bhadgaon bordered Dudh Koshi. Raya Malla established the Catur Varna Mahavihara in Bhaktapur. He died in 1505 and was succeeded by his son Bhuwana Malla.

Preceded by Yakshya Malla	King of Bhadgaon; 1482–1505	Succeeded by Bhuwana Malla
