= Jayanandadeva =

14th-century King of Kathmandu Valley

King of Nepal
- Reign: 1313–1320
- Predecessor: Ananta Malla
- Successor: Jayari Malla
- Died: Nepal
- Dynasty: Malla
- Father: Jayabhimadeva

Jayanandadeva (Newar: 𑐖𑐫𑐁𑐣𑐣𑑂𑐡𑐡𑐾𑐰), also known as Jayananda Deva, was the seventh king of Nepal after Arideva Malla, in which period the Malla dynasty was prominent. He succeeded Ananta Malla and reigned from 1313 to 1320.

== Early life ==
Jayananda belonged to the House of Bhonta and was the son of Jayabhimadeva, the fourth king of Nepal. After the death of Jayabhimadeva, his first son and Jayananda's elder half-brother Jayadityadeva was the head of the Bhonta House. Jayadityadeva installed Ananta Malla on the throne and declared himself the heir apparent. Jayadityadeva then imprisoned Jayananda near Palanchok. After the former died in 1292, Jayananda was freed from prison only to be re-imprisoned by his nephew, Jayasaktideva.

== Kingdom without a ruler: 1308–1313 ==
After his predecessor Ananta Malla's death in 1308, Nepal did not have a proper monarch for almost five years. Constant skirmishes between the Bhontas and the Tripuras, and invasions from the Tirhuts of the south brought a serious political crisis in the kingdom. Immediately after Ananta's death, the Tripuras started an aggressive conquest campaign and at one instance, Banepa, where the Bhontas resided, was brought under the control of Bhadgaon, the Tripuras' stronghold. In response to this in 1311, the Bhontas invited the Tirhuts once again to protect them from the Tripuras. The Tirhuts came and ransacked Bhadgaon. They also occupied Patan, destroyed several temples, inflicted fines, and burned villages before returning in March 1312.

During this period, there was complete absence of central power. The monarchy had no king and the local lords wielded extreme control over their area. The then head of the house of Tripura, Jayatunga Malla, died in 1312 and was succeeded by Rudra Malla, who rose as a de facto ruler of the valley after raiding Patan in 1313. Jayasaktideva also died in 1315 and the authority of Bhontas slowly began to decline.

== Reign ==
In 1313, Jayananda was crowned as King. He had no actual power and the kingdom's administration was controlled by Rudra Malla. It was Rudra Malla who, instead of inciting another violence between the two royal houses, installed Jayananda as the ruler. Jayananda was in his early 50s when he became the king. During his reign, Rudra Malla, the effective head of state, annexed several villages such as Gokarna and suppressed rebellions in Nuwakot. In 1320, Rudra Malla withdrew support for Jayananda and the latter was succeeded by Jayari Malla, the son of Ananta Malla. The date of Jayananda's death is not known, though it is certain that he lived at least until 1328.

Preceded by Ananta Malla	King of Nepal; 1313–1320	Succeeded by Jayari Malla
