= Mukunda Sen =

King of Nepal

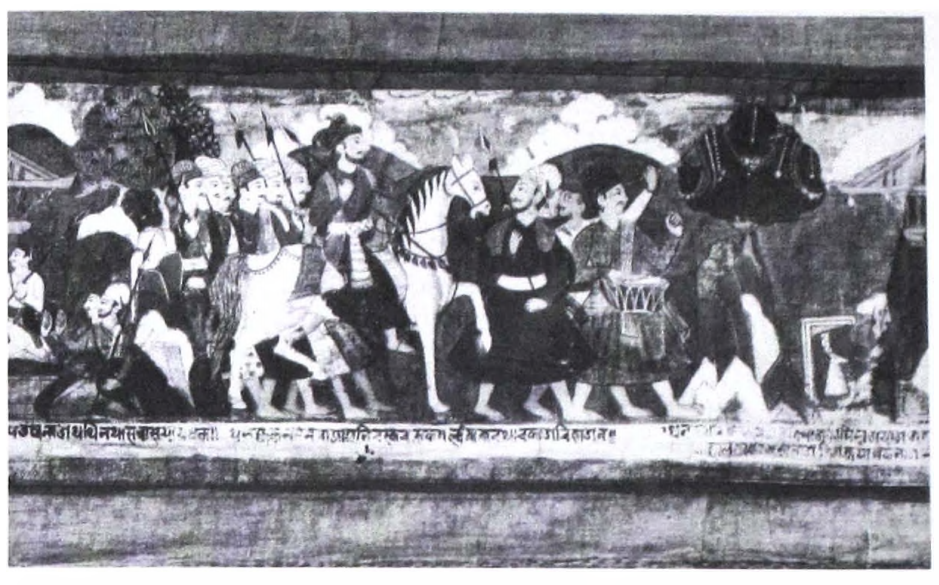
- Mukunda Sen during an invasion

King of Palpa
- Reign: 1518 – 1553
- Predecessor: Rudra Sen
- Successor: Position abolished (Palpa was divided into various kingdoms)
- Born: Kingdom of Palpa (today part of Nepal)
- Died: 1553; Palpa
- Dynasty: Sen dynasty
- Religion: Hinduism

Mukunda Sen (Sometimes known as Mani Mukunda Sen Even Makanda ) was the King of Palpa from 1518 A.D. to 1553 A.D. ( B.S. 1575 to B.S. 1610).

In 1524, he invaded Kathmandu Valley. After his death in 1553, his kingdom was divided into various kingdoms.
