= Jayayakshya Malla =

15th century King of Nepal

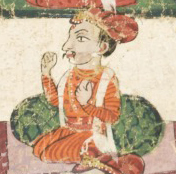
- Miniature of Yaksha Malla from a Paubha dated 1782.

King of Nepal (Note: In the early days, the name “Nepal” used to refer mostly to the valley of Kathmandu or Nepal Mandala, meaning that the King of Nepal was the King of what is present-day Kathmandu and surrounding areas.)
- Reign: 1428–1 March 1482
- Predecessor: Jyoti Malla
- Successor: Ratna Malla (Kantipur); Raya Malla (Bhaktapur)
- Born: 1408; Nepal
- Died: 1 March 1482 (aged 73–74); Nepal
- Dynasty: Malla
- Father: Jyoti Malla
- Mother: Samsar Devi

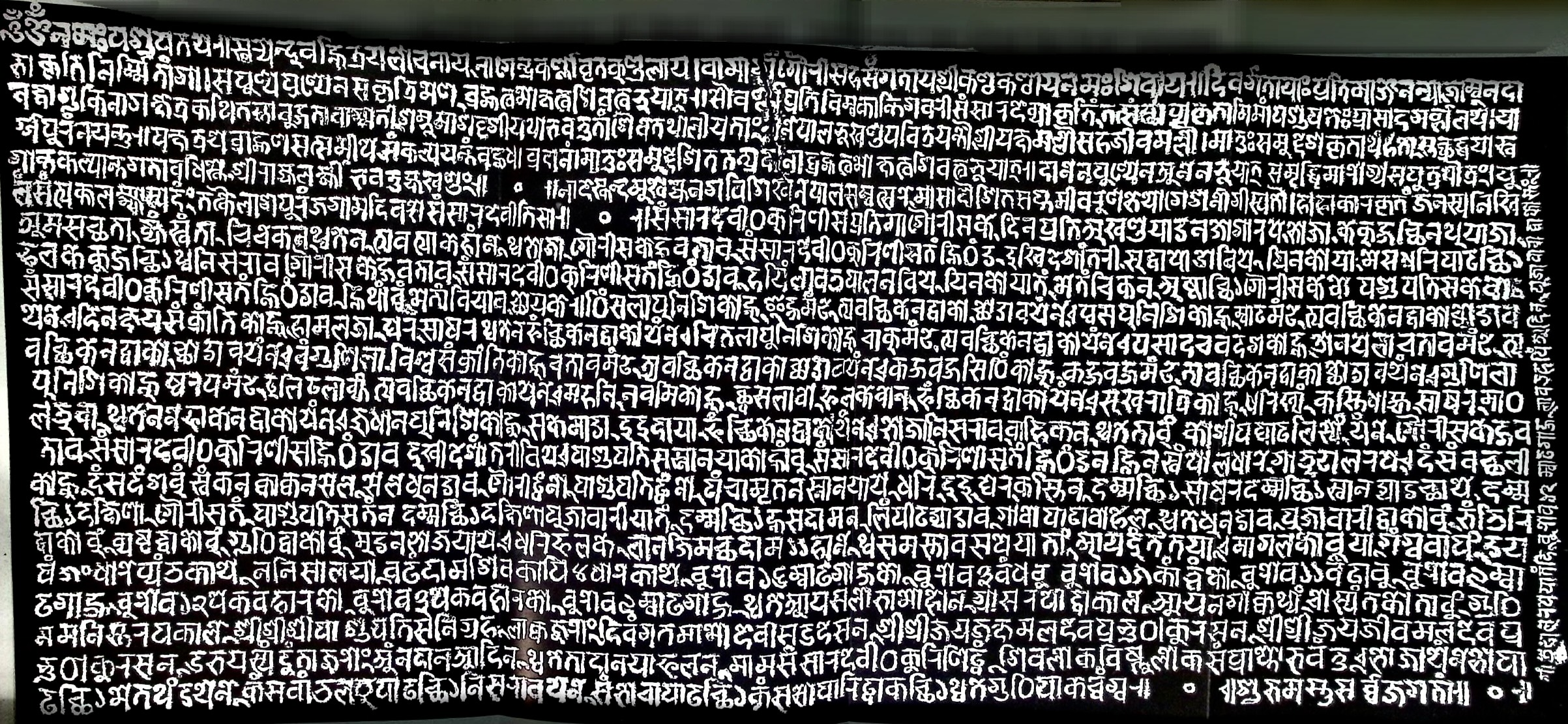
King Yaksha Malla’s copperplate inscription in the Newar language, 1446 CE.

Jayayakshya Malla (Newar: 𑐖𑐫𑐫𑐎𑑂𑐲 𑐩𑐮𑑂𑐮), often named Yaksha Malla (𑐫𑐎𑑂𑐲 𑐩𑐮𑑂𑐮) for short, was the son of Jayajyotir Malla and the last Malla king of the united Kathmandu Valley from around 1428 until his death in 1482. The valley was divided among his sons after his death.

== Biography ==
Early in his reign, Yaksha Malla raided south into Mithila, into the State of Bihar and as far as Bengal. He consolidated control over the trade route to Tibet and captured the Tibetan stronghold of Shelkar Dzong. As a result of his conquests, the boundary of Nepal extended as far as Sikkim in the east, Kerung in the North, Gorkha in the west, and Bihar in the south.

Yaksha Malla encircled Khowpa Bhaktapur city with moats and defense walls pierced with defense gates and ordered the construction of The Palace of Fifty-five Windows (Bhaktapur's Royal Palace). The palace would later be remodelled by Bhupatindra Malla in the seventeenth century.

He constructed the Pashupatinath Temple, a replica of the temple by the Bagmati River in Yein Kathmandu and the Siddha Pokhari, a large rectangular water tank located near the main city gate of Khowpa Bhaktapur. He is also credited as the founder of Yaksheswar Temple now standing in the palace complex.

After his death in 1482, the area that he ruled was divided into four kingdoms, Bhaktapur, Kantipur, Patan, and Banepa, each ruled by one of his sons. Bhaktapur was ruled by Raya Malla and Kantipur by Ratna Malla. Banepa, however, was soon annexed by or submitted itself to Bhaktapur.

== Notes ==
Preceded by Jayajyotir Malla	King of Nepal; 5 April 1320–14 September 1344	Succeeded by Ratna Malla (Kantipur); Raya Malla (Bhadgaon)
