= Jayasthiti Malla =

14th-century King of Kathmandu Valley

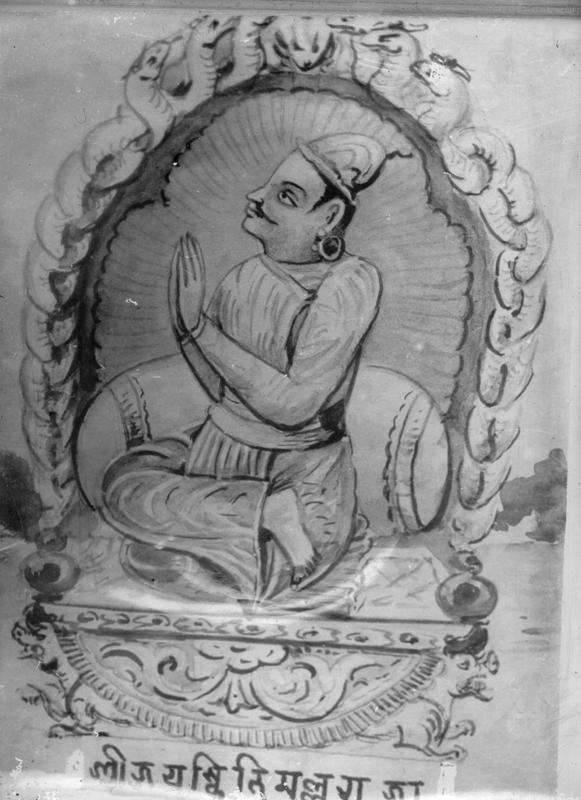
- Portrait of Jayasthiti Malla

King of Nepal
- Reign: 15 September 1382–5 September 1395
- Predecessor: Jayarjunadeva
- Successor: Joint rule of three sons until 1408; Jayajyotir Malla until 1428
- Died: 5 September 1395; Nepal
- Spouse: Rajalladevi
- Issue: Jayadharma Malla; Jayajyotir Malla; Jayakiti Malla
- Dynasty: Malla

A 1386 CE folio of a Nepal Bhasa commentary on the Amarakosha, written during the reign of Jayasthiti Malla.

Jayasthiti Malla (Nepal Bhasa: 𑐖𑐫𑐳𑑂𑐠𑐶𑐟𑐶 𑐩𑐮𑑂𑐮), also spelled Jayasthitimalla, was the eleventh Malla king of Nepal. His absolute rule over the valley began after deposing Jayarjunadeva in 1382 until his death in 1395.

== Origin and early life ==
The ancestry of Jayasthiti Malla is still a topic of debate among scholars. One narrative is that he was a person of noble birth in the Mithila region, and was brought to Kathmandu valley by Devaladevi in 1354 to marry Rajaladevi, her granddaughter and the heir apparent of Bhadgaon. Some scholars state that he was a son of an obscure figure Ashoka Malla. Jayasthiti Malla started to play a prominent role in politics after the death of Devalakshmidevi in 1366.

== Rise to power ==
=== Background ===
The valley was then controlled by two nobles houses: House of Bhonta, residence in Banepa, and the House of Tripura, residence in Bhadgaon. Jayasthiti's wife, Rajalladevi, was the head of House Tripura but Devaladevi acted as the de facto head. In 1347, after the death of Jayari Malla, Devaladevi, and the House Bhonta came to an agreement such that a king would be provided by the Bhontas but Devaldevi acted as the de facto ruler of the valley. Following the agreement, in 1348, Jayaraja of Bhonta House became the King. However, the king had comparatively less authority than Devaladevi and was fully respected only in Banepa.

=== Prevailing politics ===
Jayaraja was succeeded by his son Jayarjuna in 1361 who held even less authority than his father. Devalakshmidevi died in 1366 and Jayasthiti Malla started to play prominent part in politics. His authority came not only from being married to Rajalladevi but also from his ability to persuade the courtiers and nobles in his favor. King Jayarjuna and Jayasthiti had an intricate balance of power. Jayarjuna reigned as the monarch, with Jayasimha Rama as the prime minister, but Jayasthiti held a significant control over the valley. The citizens of Bhadgaon treated Rajalladevi as their legitimate queen and did not recognize the authority of Jayarjuna.

=== Battles against rivals ===
In 1370, Jayasthiti Malla went to Patan and gave valuable gifts to the local leaders and chiefs and brought Patan to his side. The then prime minister of the valley, Jayasimha Rama, plotted a rebellion against Jayasthiti in order to curb his growing influence. Jayasthiti imprisoned Jayasimha in 3 May 1372 but the aristocracy of Patan sided with Jayasimha and marched towards Bhadgaon in an attempt to seize it. Jayasthiti Malla promptly defeated the rebels and fifty-three prominent leaders of Patan were killed. The rebels then surrendered, and Jayasimha Rama was also freed on 30 July.

Jayasimha Rama again attempted to seize Bhadgaon and on 12 September 1374, another battle was fought. Jayasthiti's opponent, the Bhontas, were aided by Patan and the leaders of Pharping. Many nobles were taken as prisoner by Jayasthiti in that battle and subsequently his authority increased in the valley.

=== Deposition of the monarch ===
On 23 November 1381, Jayasthiti Malla, with the consent of Patan, exiled the reigning monarch Jayarjuna to Banepa which excluded the latter from being involved in any sort of political activities in Kathmandu valley. Jayasthiti Malla then exercised his authority over the entire valley. Jayarjuna attempted to regain his control by returning to Gokarna and attacking Bhadgaon but Jayasthiti defeated and arrested him. Jayasthiti Malla then became the de facto king of the valley.

== Reign ==
Jayasthiti Malla was formally proclaimed as the king on 15 September 1382 in the presence of all noblemen. He was given royal titles in Patan but in Bhadgaon, he was the heir apparent of his wife, Rajalladevi. Rajalladevi died in 1385 and he became the official head of Bhadgaon as well. Even after the death of Rajalladevi, Jayasthiti was not usually addressed with the royal titles and only as a prince. However, he was well respected by the Bhontas and the feudal lords of Patan.

During the later years of his reign, he lost significant control over the valley. Bhontas declared independence, with Jayasimha Rama as the leader, and the local lords of Patan also attempted to be autonomous.

=== Reforms ===
==== Social reforms ====
Jayasthiti Malla is generally considered the first ruler to define jobs based on caste system. The Brahmins were to conduct priestly functions and given high posts in the administration. Brahmins were appointed as Pradhan, Maskey, etc. Literate Buddhist Bhikshus were to act as priests and preceptors and the rest were to work as carpenters, masons, and other artisans. The law was made strict and punishment was given to those who did not adhere to it. This division of labor is considered to have reduced unemployment problems and also made people skillful in their respective jobs.

He also changed the system of punishment for criminals. From then onward, criminals were to be punished by imposing fines and not with beating and abusive behaviors.

==== Economic reforms ====
Jayasthiti Malla introduced a uniform system of measurement throughout his kingdom. Measurement of lands were done using Tunga which allowed for people to buy and sell lands easily.

==== Art, literature and music ====
Jayasthiti Malla built multiple temples, and renovated many. He also made regulations about the funeral process. He was a devotee of Lord Rama and encouraged the plays of Ramayana, and Bhairavananda.

== Personal life and succession ==
He was married to Rajalla Devi, the heir apparent of Bhaktapur and they had three sons:

- Jayadharma Malla
- Jyoti Malla
- Jayakirti Malla

Jayasthiti Malla died on 5 September 1395 and was succeeded by the joint rule of all three of his sons. Jayakriti Malla, and Jayadharma Malla died in 1403 and 1408 respectively, and Jyoti Malla ruled as the sole ruler until 1428.

Preceded by Jayarjunadeva	King of Nepal; 15 September 1382–5 September 1395	Succeeded by Jayadharma Malla
