= Devalakshmidevi =

14th-century politician of Kathmandu Valley

De-facto ruler of Kathmandu Valley
- In office 1347–1366
- Monarchs: Jayarajadeva; Jayarjunadeva

Personal details
- Born: 1300
- Died: 18 April 1366 (aged 65–66)
- Spouse: King Harisimhadeva
- Children: Jagatsimha
- Parent(s): Jayatunga Malla (father); Padmulladevi (mother)

Devalakshmidevi (often known as Devaladevi) was the daughter of Jayatunga Malla of Bhaktapur, and the wife of King Harisimhadeva of Tirhut. She was a key figure in the Malla-era politics in the 14th century until her death on 18 April 1366.

== Marriage with Harisimhadeva ==
Devaladevi was the daughter of Jayatunga Malla of the House of Tripura, which was a ruling house in Bhadgaon at that time in Kathmandu Valley. In 1310 C.E., King Harisimhadeva of Mithila invaded the Kathmandu Valley and after negotiations, in addition with other gifts, Devaladevi was given in marriage to Harisimhadeva.

== Return to Bhadgaon ==
In 1324 C.E Ghiyath al-Din Tughluq invaded and conquered Tirhut. Harisimhadeva, along with Devaladevi and their son Jagatsimha, fled to Kathmandu valley. Harisimhadeva died while en route due to his injuries but Devaladevi and Jagatsimha were welcomed by her brother Jayarudra Malla in Bhadgaon, who was then head of the House of Tripura and the de facto ruler (Note: The then monarch was Jayari Malla who was installed as a puppet ruler by Jayarudra Malla.) of the Kathmandu valley.

== Involvement in Politics ==
Jayarudra Malla died in 1326 C.E and without any male heirs, his daughter Nayakadevi was the heir to the House of Tripura. Nayakadevi was initially married to Harischandra, a refugee from Kashi, but in 1335 he was poisoned by the nobles. Then onwards, Devaladevi worked on gaining political supports from courtiers and nobles and later on her son, Jagatsimha, married Nayakadevi.

Following the death of the then presiding monarch Jayari Malla in 1344, Devaladevi made an agreement with the House of Bhonta that a monarch would be installed from Bhonta on the condition that she remained the de facto ruler of the valley. In 1347, Jayarajadeva was crowned as the King following the agreement and Devaladevi remained the controlling figure. She was given higher titles than the King himself.

In 1347, a daughter, Rajaladevi, was born to Nayakadevi and Jagatsimha. Nayakadevi died ten days later and after a violent outbreak in the palace, Jagatsimha was thrown into prison where he died. This event left Rajaladevi, the heir to the House of Tripura, under the care of Devaladevi.

She was in constant political conflicts with the rebels and in 1348 she imprisoned Pashupati Malla, a powerful rebel.

== Later life ==
In 1354, Devaladevi brought Jayasthiti Malla, a man of obscure but noble birth, from the Mithila region to marry Rajaladevi, her granddaughter and the heir to the House of Tripura. Jayasthiti Malla later united the broken kingdoms of Kantipur, Patan, and Bhadgaon.

Devaladevi played a very active role in politics until her death in 1366.
