= Bhupatindra Malla =

King of Bhaktapur from 1696 to 1722

- King of Bhaktapur
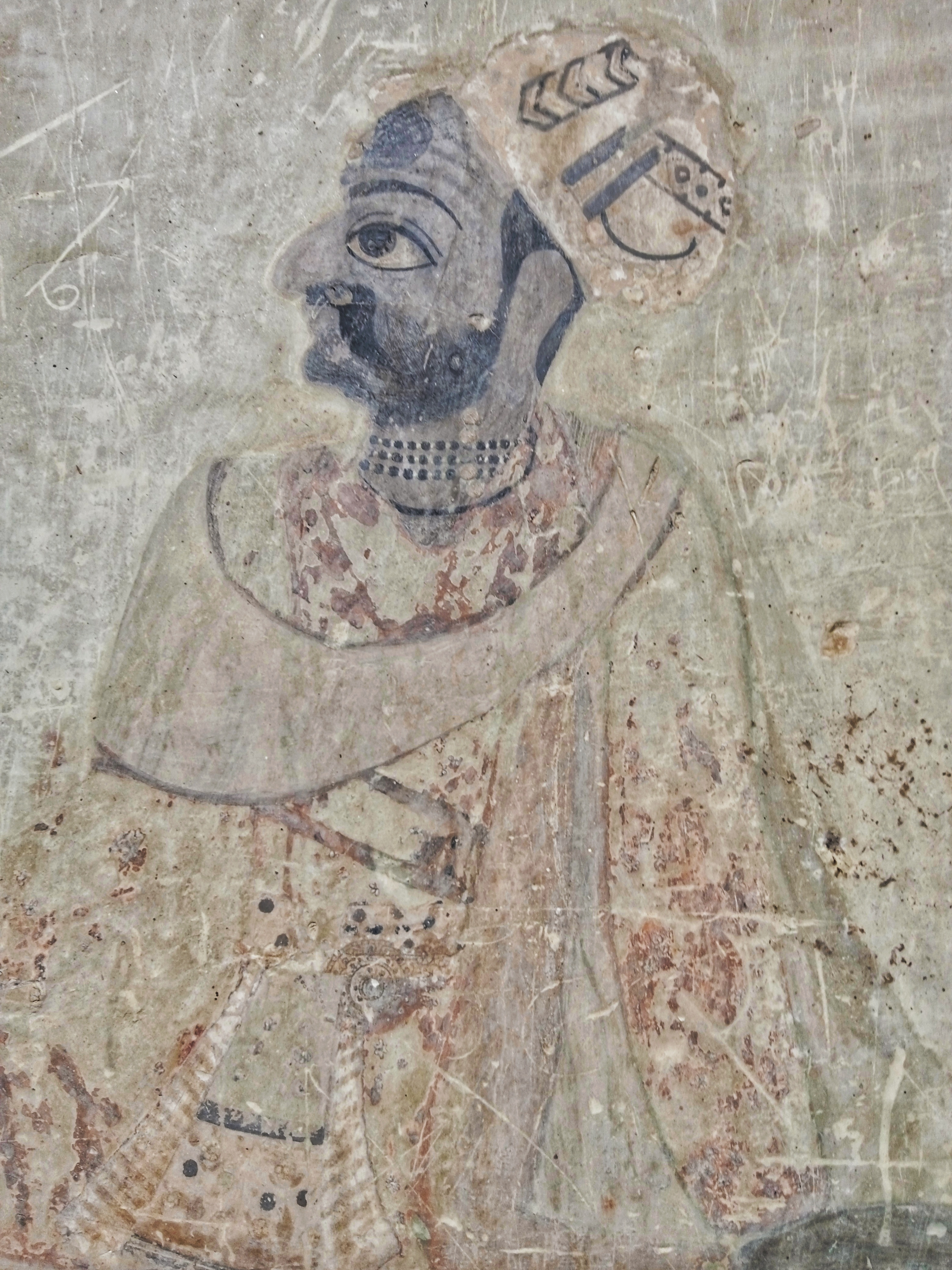
- Mural at a courtyard of the royal palace.

King of Bhaktapur
- Reign: 1696 –1722
- Coronation: 11 September 1696
- Predecessor: Jitamitra Malla
- Successor: Ranajit Malla
- Chief Minister: Hāku Bhāju
- Born: 3 November 1674; Bhaktapur Durbar Square, Kingdom of Bhaktapur
- Died: 15 April 1722 (aged 47); Bhaktapur, Kingdom of Bhaktapur
- Spouse: Vishva Lakshmi (m. 1687)
- Issue: Ranajit Malla; Kirti Lakshmi
Names
- Bhupatindra Malla
Regnal name
- Sri Sri Jaya Bhupatindra Malla Deva
- Dynasty: Malla dynasty
- Father: Jitamitra Malla
- Mother: Lālamati Devi

Bhupatindra Malla (Nepal Bhasa: 𑐨𑐹𑐥𑐟𑐷𑐣𑑂𑐡𑑂𑐬 𑐩𑐮𑑂𑐮; 3 November 1674 – 15 April 1722) was a Malla Dynasty King of the Kingdom of Bhaktapur (present day Bhaktapur, Nepal) who reigned from 1696 until his death in 1722. He is the most widely known king of Bhaktapur and is among the most popular of the Malla dynasty. He is popularly known in Bhaktapur as nepaḥ juju, meaning the king of the Newars. His reign was characterized by the construction of numerous palaces and temples with the Nyatapola temple being his most revered contribution. An integral part of the local folklore, Bhupatindra Malla is regarded as a great builder and a lover of arts whose reign is considered the cultural high point of Bhaktapur. In particular, he was a scholar of the Maithili language and composed 26 plays in Maithili throughout his lifetime.

His parents, Jitamitra and Lālamati, wanted him to be a skilled ruler and since childhood he was given a chance to rule alongside his father. He was also keen on building, having built a hiti and a public shelter (called a phalcā in Nepal Bhasa) at Thimi as a prince. His most famous contributions are the Nyatapola Temple, a Nepalese-style five-storey temple completed in a six-month period between 1702 and 1703 and the palace of fifty-five windows, both of which are often considered an apogee of Nepalese architecture. He was also an avid lyricist and playwright with some of his songs still being sung in Bhaktapur. Bhupatindra Malla was also a politically strong figure in the Nepal Valley and established the reputation of Bhaktapur as a strong military principality similar to that of Kantipur. He has been described by Ippolito Desideri as "the first ruler of Bhaktapur to not pay tribute to the king of Kantipur". Bhupatindra Malla is among the most popular and influential of the Malla kings and also has great cultural importance in Bhaktapur. The silhouette of his gold-plated bronze statue at the royal palace complex is often used by various organizations and corporations as a symbol to represent Bhaktapur.

== Early years ==
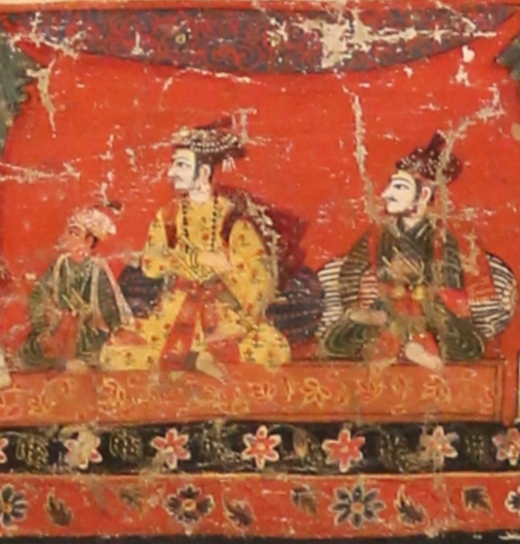
Miniature of a twelve-year-old Bhupatindra Malla (right) from a Paubha dated 1686. Sitting behind him are his father and his uncle Ugra Malla (right).

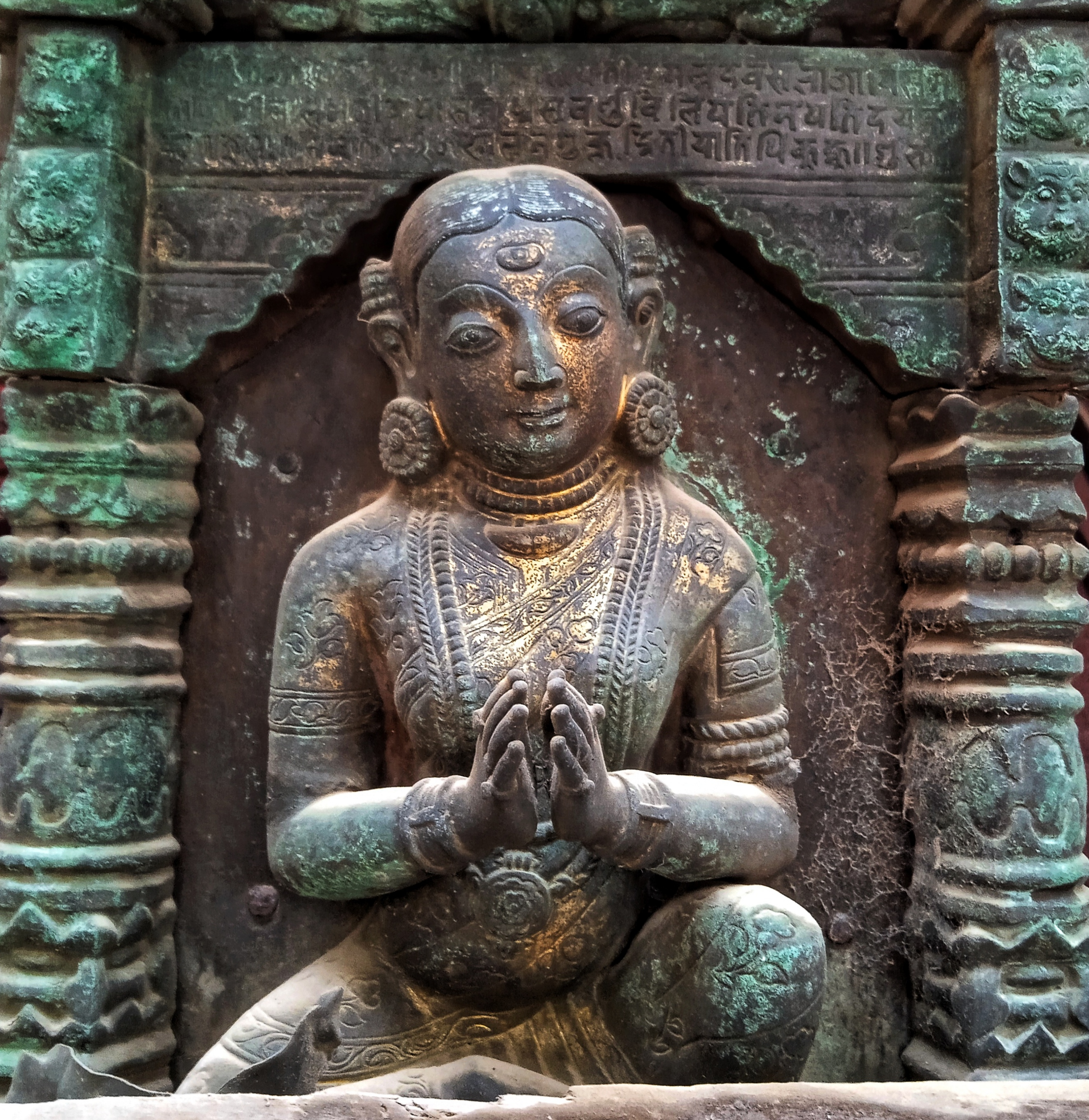
Gilt copper statuette depicting Bhupatindra Malla's mother, Lālamati; she often assisted her son during his reign.

Bhupatindra Malla was born to Jitamitra Malla by his queen consort Lālamati on kārtika śukla khaṣṭhī (the sixth day of the bright half of the month of kārtika) in Nepal Sambat 795, equivalent to 3 November 1674 on the Gregorian calendar.

There was another son born to Lalamati and Jitamitra Malla before the birth of Bhupatindra Malla. The contemporary expenditure book has a record of the Annaprashana (Newar: macā janko) ceremony of a prince in April 1674 (NS 795), before the birth of Bhupatindra Malla. This prince has simply been referred as "Jitamitra Malla's Prince" in the expenditure book and finds no mention in any other sources.

Bhupatindra Malla was raised by his mother Lālamati who played a very important role to shape the psychology of the young prince.

=== Premarital ceremonies ===
Many of Bhupatindra Malla's pre-marital rite of passage have been recorded in the contemporary expenditure books, like the Chudakarana, Upanayana and the Diksha. For instance, the Chudakarana ceremony of Bhupatindra Malla was done on 1 March 1685 in Dumāju chuka, a courtyard of the royal palace. The rituals done during this ceremony and the expenditures incurred in it are recorded in the expenditure book. Similarly, his Upanayana (Classical Newar: Būdān) was held on 3 February 1686. Likewise, the expenditure incurred, and the rituals performed for the ceremony has been recorded in detail in the expenditure book.

=== Marriage ===
Bhupatindra Malla was married to Vishva Lakshmi on 4 November 1687, when he was 13 years old. According to contemporary ledgers, the bakery work for the wedding started on 25 June 1687. By September, Jitamitra Malla had sent letters to officials in Thimi, Banepa and other cities within the kingdom. The letters contained the amount of tax money required from the cities and the ingredients required for the feast. In the feast following the wedding, all the citizens of Bhaktapur were invited. Likewise, 16,244 citizens from other cities within the kingdom were also invited. Jitamitra Malla himself wrote a Newari play titled "Madālasā Harana" which was performed during the wedding. Dancers from the royal court of Kantipur as well as other citizens from Kantipur were invited to perform in the ceremony. The dancers from Kantipur performed a dance named "Bhimānanda pyākhan" for which they were paid 20 rupees. Similarly, dancers from Thimi and Sāngā, which lied within the Kingdom of Bhaktapur, were only paid 8 rupees for their performance during the weeding.

=== Financials of the wedding ceremony ===
The preparations for the wedding ceremony to be held in November began from June. During a marriage of the Newar prince, there was a ceremony called "vātā chóyā" and "kū chóyā" was held which involved sending different varieties of bread to the bride's residence. For that ceremony, the bakery work started on 25 June 1687. On 26 June 1687, the Bhāju (a Newari term for the chief minister) of Jitamitra Malla's court gave 600 rupees to the customs officer in order to gather all the necessary ingredients for the feast. Since a lot of guests were to be invited in the wedding, the income of the royal family couldn't handle the expenses alone. So, the Malla kings and especially Jitamitra Malla (Note: Jitamitra Malla was known to impose the sevākū tax in most of the royal ceremonies in contrast to other Malla kings who only used sevākū in a royal wedding.) collected culinary ingredients from the cities within the Kingdom of Bhaktapur. This form of taxing was called "sevākū". The first of these "sevākū" was collected from Nala. Jitamitra Malla wrote "...As per the orders of Sri Sri Sumāti Jitamitra Malla (Note: Jitamitra Malla's regnal name), Nala is to provide the following to Purvarāma who will bring them to the royal court..." on his letter. The list of ingredients asked from Nala included, a buffalo costing six mohars, two ducks, two goats, forty eggs, 2.18 liters oil, 160 kg flattened rice, 2 kg salt, fish, dhau, 3.2 liters milk, banana, pork, venison and different varieties of sesame.

=== Diksha ===
Diksha ceremonies were generally held in an eclipse, solar eclipses being more favoured. There was an annular solar eclipse on 5 November 1687, just a day after the wedding day in which Bhupatindra Malla conducted his Diksha ceremony. In Bhaktapur however, the eclipse was partial which started at 8:06 in the morning, reached its peak at 9:10 and ended at 10 in the morning. A priest named Jayamuni directed the ceremony for which he received 500 rupees as Dakṣiṇā. The preparation for this ceremony had begun from 22 September 1687. Contemporary ledgers contain the details of the dishes served during the feast following this ceremony.

=== Folklore ===
Bhupatindra Malla's childhood has been highly dramatised in the folklore of Bhaktapur. The story, although historically inaccurate quite popular in Bhaktapur. The story goes that Jitamitra Malla's junior queen despised Bhupatindra Malla and wanted to make her own issue the future king of Bhaktapur. So, she asks for help from the chief minister, Bhāju Kasa, who also wanting to usurp the throne himself decides to help her and the couple manages to persuade Bhupatindra Malla to visit a nearby forest with some hired assassins. The assassins however finding him innocent and touched by his pleadings leave him in the forest and run their knives on a goat. Bhupatindra Malla is later found by a family of Tibetan craftsmen and it was under their raising that Bhupatindra developed his love for arts. Meanwhile, Bhāju Kasa and the junior queen successfully becomes the defacto albeit unpopular rulers of Bhaktapur. After some years Bhupatindra Malla, being taught his real identity returns to Bhaktapur as a young man who immediately becomes popular among the locals. Bhupatindra Malla manages to gather a small army with the help of which, Bhupatindra Malla attack Bhāju Kasa and his stepmother. This time, Bhupatindra Malla successfully takes back the throne and executes Bhāju Kasa and puts his usurping stepmother in a house arrest. This event likely didn't happen and was not a true historical event but can be regarded as folklore. The main point to disprove this story is that Jitamitra Malla didn't have multiple queens. There are no mention of Jitamitra having any queen other than Lālamati. Moreover, there are chronicles documenting the various rituals of a young Bhupatindra Malla and even a painting of a young Bhupatindra Malla. So, the story seems very unlikely.

== Reign ==
=== Rise to power ===
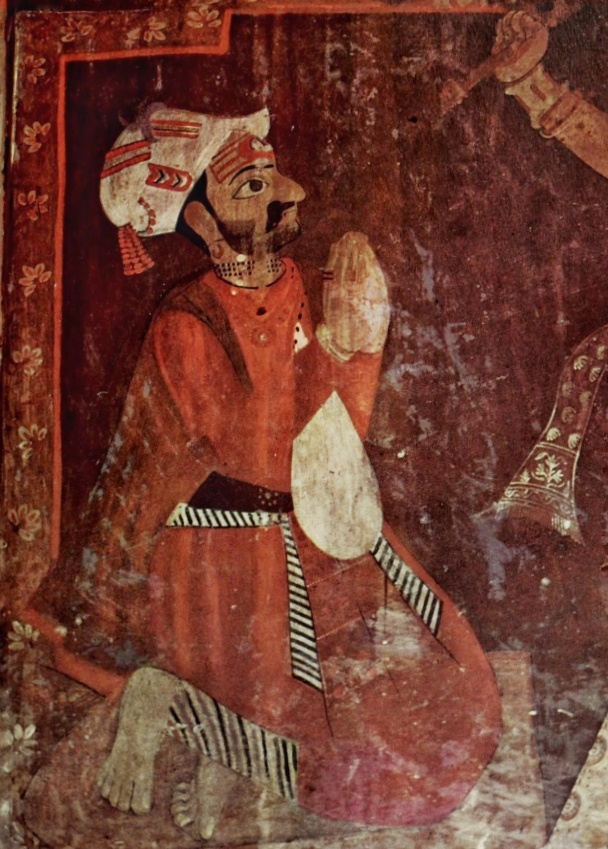
A fresco of Bhupatindra Malla in prayer at the Bhaila Chuka courtyard, Bhaktapur Durbar Square, c. 18th century.

Initially, when history in Nepal was still in its infancy, it was believed that Bhupatindra Malla was crowned on 21 September 1696, after his father's death. However, a treaty signed between Yognarendra Malla of Patan and Bhaktapur five months after the supposed "death" of Jitamitra Malla titles Jitamitra Malla as the current king of Bhaktapur. The doubt regarding the death of Jitamitra Malla was further supported by a line from the document containing the religious rites performed by him, which dated to around June of 1699 mentions a homa ritual performed by Jitamitra Malla. Because of these evidence, historians pushed forward the idea that Jitamitra Malla voluntarily gave up the throne for Bhupatindra Malla and spent the rest of his life performing pious deeds. The idea was that Jitamitra Malla wanted to avoid a conflict with his heir as was the case with Pratapa Malla and his father Lakshminarasingha Malla in Kantipur and Yognarendra Malla and his father Srinivasa Malla in Lalitpur. This idea was further brought into main stream by Nepalese playwright Bhim Nidhi Tiwari in his historical drama, Mahārāja Bhūpatīndra. Recently however, historians like Om Prasad Dhaubhadel put forward the idea that Bhupatindra Malla succeeded his father via a revolt just like in the case of Pratap Malla, after putting him in house arrest.

Under the direction of his father, Bhupatindra Malla had renovated a stone spout (hiti) and a resting place (phalcā) in Thimi. When Bhupatindra Malla became sufficiently skilled to rule on his own, Jitamitra Malla abdicated the throne. He lived in the Thanthu Lyākū palace which was built by himself and spent the rest of his life in pilgrimage and other religious activities.

Just a few months after his coronation, Bhupatindra Malla inaugurated a play named "Kolāsuravadhopākhyāna" in early March 1697. For this occasion, he offered a ritual oil lamp called tvādevā to Nāsadyah, (Note: A local deity of music of dance, often compared to Nataraja.) the deity of music and dance.

=== Clashes with Yoga Naréndra Malla ===
Yog Narendra Malla became the king of the Kingdom of Lalitpur (present day Lalitpur, Nepal) after he started a revolt against his father Srinivasa Malla. Yog Narēndra Malla was an ambitious king who upon his coronation in 1684 made an alliance with Jitamitra Malla in order to isolate and take over Kantipur. At that time, Kantipur's monarch was an infant Bhupālēndra Malla (Note: This monarch is often confused with Bhupatindra Malla.) and the power was mostly on the hands of the chief minister Lakshmi Narayana Joshi. In 1689, Yog Narēndra Malla with the help of Jitamitra Malla successful isolated Kantipur and the combined forces attacked several forts that belonged to Kantipur while the infant king was being paraded around the town.

Bhupatindra Malla with the help of Gorkha, Makwanpur and Tanahun forced Yog Narendra Malla to sign a treaty in 1701 according to which the Kingdom of Lalitpur had to pay a hefty amount to Bhaktapur and Gorkha, Makwanpur and Tanahun if an alliance was made with Kantipur without their consent. This treaty greatly angered Yog Narendra Malla and in 1705 he attacked a fort called "Obhu" that belonged to Bhaktapur. However, due to the fort's strength Yog Narendra Malla's force were not able to capture it. His forces continued to attack the fort while Yog Narendra himself was operating from Changu. As the threat of attack on Bhaktapur grew, Bhupatindra Malla with his son Ranajit, retreated to Banepa and declared it the kingdom's temporary capital. On 28 October 1705, Yog Narēndra Malla was poisoned in Changu, probably by the spies of Bhupatindra Malla. As a result of the poisoning, Yog Narendra Malla died on Wednesday, 28 October 1705. After, Yog Narēndra's death, the attacks on Bhaktapur stopped as a crisis of succession was created in Lalitpur.

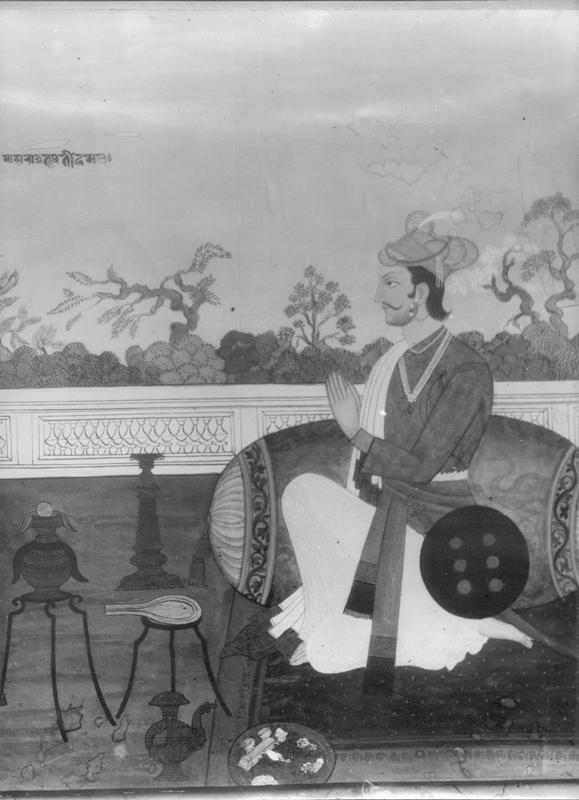
Portrait of King Bhupatindra Malla on the walls of the Jana bahal temple complex, Kathmandu.

After the death of Yog Narēndra Malla, the throne of Lalitpur became empty. Bhupatindra Malla helped in the crowning of Lokaprakāsha Malla, the son of Yogamati who herself was the daughter of Yoga Naréndra Malla. Since, Lokaprakāsha was just seven years old, Kantipur saw this as the chance to make Lalitpur a part of their own kingdom. Similar to Lalitpur, the monarch Bhaskar Malla was just eight years old and the power was on the hands of his mother, Bhuvana Lakshmi. The queen mother of Kantipur, went to Lalitpur to bring Lokaprakāsha to her kingdom. The twenty-year-old mother of Lokaprakāsha, Yogamati asked Bhupatindra Malla for help against Kantipur's plan. With Bhupatindra's help, Lalitpur captured Bhuvana Lakshmi and imprisoned her for four days. The citizens of Kantipur then kidnapped Lokaprakāsha but Bhupatindra Malla rescued him and declared Lalitpur a protectorate of Bhaktapur. Lokaprakāsha died from smallpox just a year after his coronation and the throne of Patan became empty again. This time, the nephew of Yog Narēndra Malla, Indra Malla, was crowned but the power remained in the hands of Yogamati. Moreover, Lalitpur secretly made an alliance with Kantipur and in 1708 the combined forces of Kantipur and Lalitpur attacked the "Obhu" fort of Bhaktapur four more times but were unable to breach the fort.

=== Gaurivivāha play ===
Gaurivivāha (lit. 'marriage of Gauri') was a Nepal Bhasa play detailing the marriage of Parvati to Shiva. The play written by Bhupatindra Malla himself which was shown in the Kingdom of Patan in early January 1707. The money collected from the play was used by Bhupatindra Malla to offer a bell to the lord of dance, Nrityasvara.

=== Death of Jitamitra Malla and Ugra Malla ===
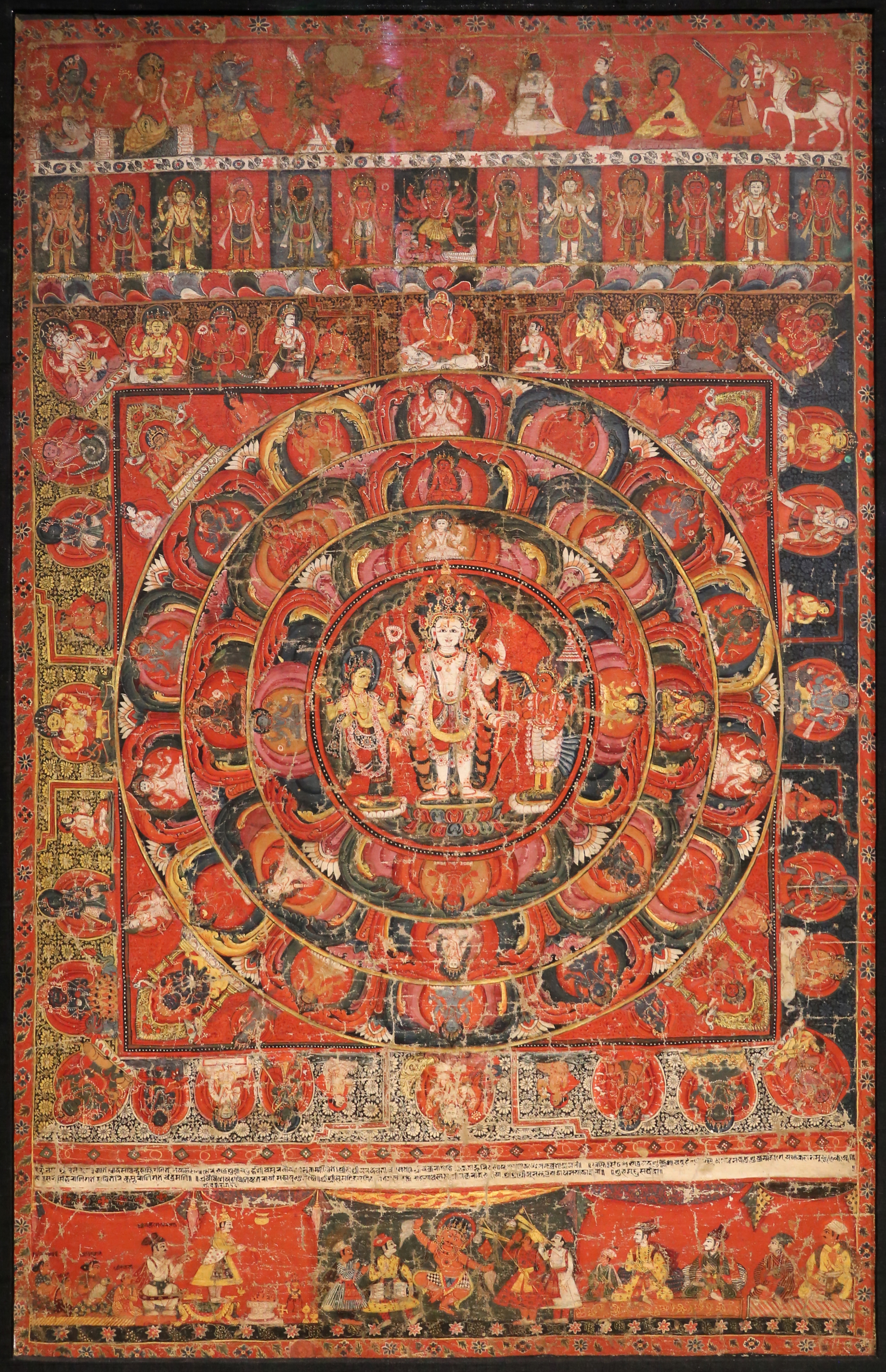
A Paubha dedicated to Vishnu painted in September 1687. On the bottom right, beside the trumpet players sit (from left to right) Bhupatindra Malla, Jitamitra Malla and Ugra Malla.

Many historians and authors have wrongly written that Jitamitra Malla died around the same time Bhupatindra Malla was crowned. But there are some chronicles (Thyāsāfu in Newari) that say that Jitamitra Malla after leaving the throne once his son became capable of reigning, lived in Thanthu Lyākū, a palace constructed by Jitamitra himself and spent the rest of his life in religious activities. However, Jitamitra Malla's last days are still a mystery. Records of Jitamitra Malla disappear suddenly after Bhupatindra's coronation. During his own reign, Jitamitra Malla was known to document events in the form of dhara pau (translating to ledger books) which contained financials of royal ceremonies and the details of every single religious rites that he performed. Sudden disappearance of his records have led to some theories that Bhupatindra Malla may have usurped the throne from his father who was put into house arrest in the Thanthu Lyākū palace. A ritual book dated from the late years of the 17th century states, "This is the kingdom (referring to Bhaktapur) won by Bhupatindra Malla", perhaps indicating a usurpation. Furthermore, a contemporary Paubha painting of Shiva which contains the miniature of the royal family of Bhaktapur does not have a miniature of Jitamitra Malla. The royal family depicted composed of Bhupatindra Malla on his throne, his uncle Ugra Malla, his mother Lālamati, his sister Bhānumati and his queen Vishva Lakshmi seated together and in prayer to Shiva. Jitamitra Malla's name appears for one last time in a ledger book which states that:

On the 10th day of the dark half of the month of Jyeshtha of Nepal Sambat 819 (= 12 June 1699), Sri Sri Sumāti Jitamitra Malla performed a siddhi homa.

Scholar Bhim Nidhi Tiwari theorised that Jitamitra Malla may have died around January 1705. A contemporary chronicle (Thyāsāfu in Nepal Bhasa) from 1708 report the death of Jitamitra's younger brother Ugra Malla. The same chronicle also mention the sight of a comet around the same time which was considered a bad omen.

Historian, Om Dhaubhadel has theorised that Bhupatindra Malla may have put his father in house arrest in the Thanthu Lyākū palace and crowned himself in a similar manner to what Pratap Malla did. It is really hard to prove or disprove this as the Thanthu Lyākū palace no longer exists and most of its inscription may have been lost with it. Thus, this theory is based upon the folklore of Bhāgirāma Kāyastha (alias Bhāju Kasa), the chief minister in Jitamitra Malla's court. Although Jitamitra Malla himself speaks highly of Bhāju Kasa, even declaring him as the second greatest in the kingdom after him in one of his inscriptions, the folklore of Bhaktapur sees him as an antagonist figure who tried to usurp the throne and assassinate a young Bhupatindra Malla with the help of Jitamitra Malla's youngest queen. The story also assumes that Bhājyā Pūkhū, a large rectangular tank on the eastern border of Bhaktapur with a Shiva temple in its center which was commissioned by and named after Bhāju Kasa, was in fact built by Bhāju Kasa in order to win the support of the junior queen. In reality however, the pond existed since the 12th century and Bhāju Kasa only commissioned its renovation as the tank and the temple in its middle likely suffered heavy damage from the earthquake in 1681. The story further says that after gaining support of the junior queen Bhāju Kasa uses the new gained power to trick a young Bhupatindra Malla to go to a secluded forest with some hired assassins while Bhāju Kasa and Jitamitra Malla's junior queen rule Bhaktapur. The story now shifts to a young Bhupatindra Malla who is spared by the assassins who run their knife on a goat instead and is picked up by a family of Tibetan artisans who raises him and eventually Bhupatindra Malla gathers his own army and takes back the throne. It is said that then Bhupatindra Malla executes Bhāju Kasa and puts his usurping stepmother on house arrest in the Thanthu Lyākū palace. In actuality however, Bhāju Kasa was an extremely popular figure in contemporary Bhaktapur whose popularity caused to be the subject of harassment from his counterpart in Kantipur. Similarly, there is no any historical evidence of Jitamitra Malla's junior queen as he likely only had Lālamati as the only queen. Historian Dhaubhadel suspects that Bhupatindra Malla may have put both his father and his stepmother in house arrest in Thanthu Lyākū palace and then erased any evidences of his stepmother. But this theory ultimately fails to explain the big influence that Lālamati, who even consecrated several gilt bronze statues of herself and Jitamitra Malla, and Ugra Malla had during Bhupatindra Malla's reign. Similarly, Bhupatindra Malla's rock inscription at a quarry in the eastern part of Bhaktapur states that "Bhupatindra Malla, in order to build a stone temple in his father's name had these rocks collected". So, Jitamitra Malla's death just like his birth (Note: The exact birthdate of kings of Bhaktapur prior to Bhupatindra Malla is not properly known unlike their counterparts of Kantipur and Lalitpur, mostly because of a lack of proper historical research.) is still a mystery.

=== Wild elephant hunt in the Terai forest ===
Catching and taming of wild elephants was considered a sign of masculinity in medieval Nepal. There are three instances of Bhupatindra Malla hunting for wild elephants in the Terai forest. The first hunt was held on 24 March 1708. There are no further details about this hunt as the chronicle simply mention that Bhupatindra Malla chased elephants on Fālguna sudi 13 of Nepal Sambat 829. The second hunt was on 21 December 1711 in the forests of Terai. This time, Bhupatindra Malla was accompanied in his hunt by Mānikasena, the king of Makwanpur. A fresco inside the royal palace of Bhaktapur depict this scene.

The final hunt was in 1714 in the forests of Makwanpur Terai as well. This time however, he tamed a female elephant and brought it back to Bhaktapur. The elephant was named "Vasanti" and was offered to Goddess Taleju (Note: Taleju is the tutelary goddess of the Malla kings.) on 1 July 1714 by Bhupatindra Malla. A gold inscription at the Taleju temple mentions this event as "Bhupatindra Malla brought back a female elephant, Vasanti from Makwanpur. A lot of effort was put to bring her back and Sri Sri Bhupatindra Malla offered Vasanti to Goddess Taleju".

=== Treaty with Kantipur and Lalitpur ===
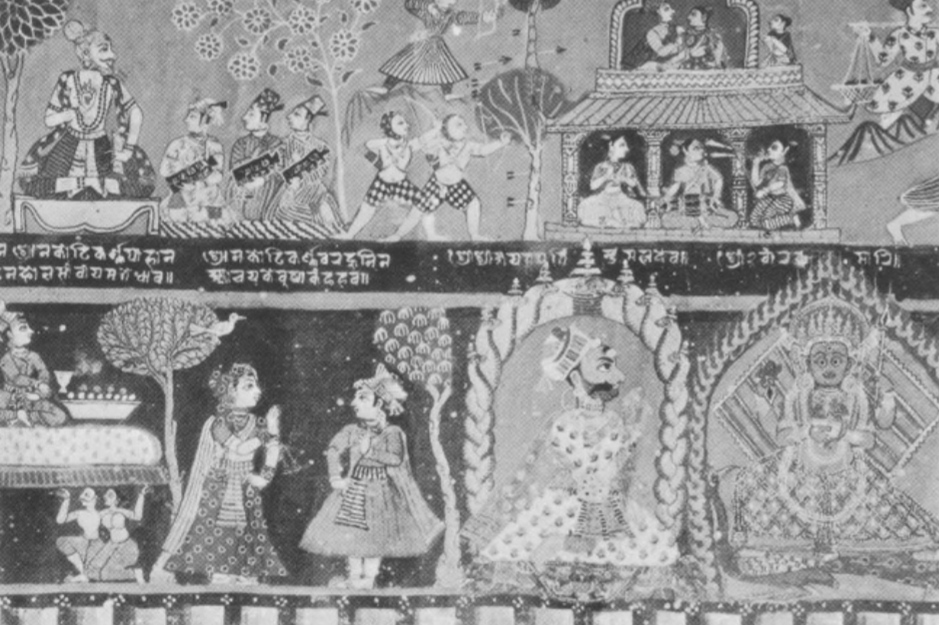
Miniature of Bhupatindra Malla on his serpent throne from a Buddhist manuscript.

In 1914, Bhupatindra Malla had to sue for peace with Bhaksar Malla of Kantipur and the king of Lalitpur. For this, he gave two elephants and one camel to the king of Lalitpur while Bhaksar Malla of Kantipur received a camel and an elephant each from him. Based on the stone sculpture of a camel pair at a temple in the palace square of Bhaktapur, it becomes clear that these camels were Dromedary. In the entirety of Nepal, there are only two depictions of camels, the first being a stone sculpture at a temple of Bhaktapur and the other in a latticed window in Bhaktapur as well. It becomes clear that the Kingdom of Bhaktapur had some camels, a non-native and a rare animal for Nepal. The presence of camels became the subject of pride for Bhaktapur. The temple containing the sculpture of the camel pair was built during the reign of Bhupatindra's father. So, Bhaktapur might have had camels even before the reign of Bhupatindra. Apart from the camel trade by Bhaktapur with its neighbours and the few depictions of it in Bhaktapur as well, other mentions of camels has not been found in Nepalese history yet.

=== Visit by Father Ippolito Desideri ===
Ippolito Desideri was an Italian Christian missionary who arrived in Nepal on 27 December 1721 on his return trip from Tibet. He stayed in Kathmandu and Patan for a while and only entered Bhaktapur on 14 January 1722. He stayed in Bhaktapur until 25 January as a guest of Capuchin Catholic friars living in Bhaktapur. He described Bhaktapur as:

Badgao (Bhaktapur) stands on a hill some six or seven miles from Kathmandu. The air is much better, and with its fine houses and well laid out streets it is a much gayer and more beautiful city than the other two; it has several hundred thousand inhabitants who are engaged in trade

— Ippolito Desideri,

Similarly, he described Bhupatindra Malla as:

The old Kinglet of Badgao was also rich, and a very capable man. He had always refused to pay tribute to the ruler of Kattmandu, but was at last forced, not only to pay, but to give more, after spending large sums in war. During the short time I was at Badgao this ruler twice sent for me, showed me much honour, and when I left, gave me a letter to the King of Bitia (Bettiah), whose kingdom I was to traverse; he also gave me an escort to protect me until I had crossed the uninhabited mountains.

== Death (1722) and the Plague epidemic (1716–1722) ==
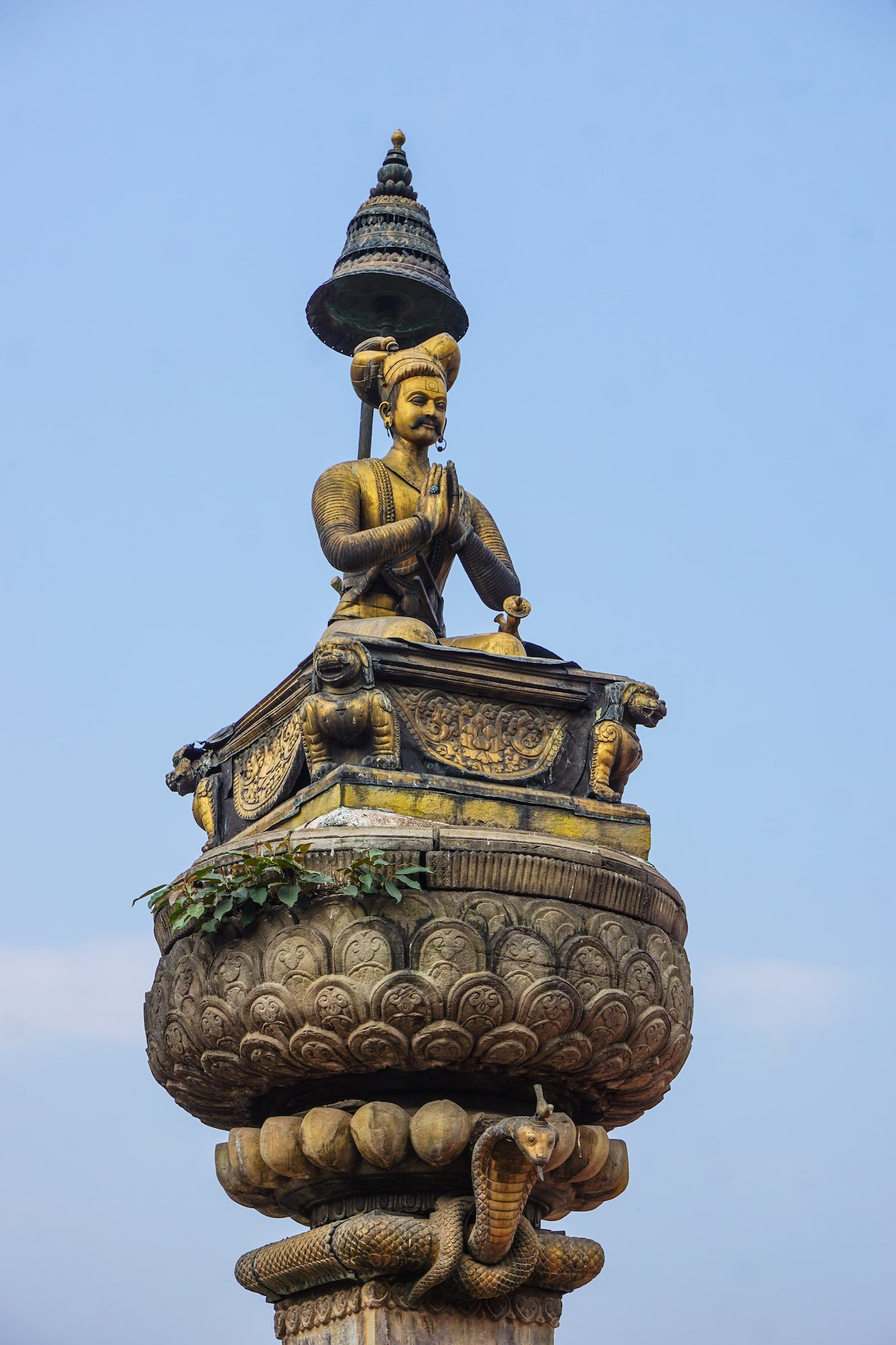
A likely posthumous gold plated statue of Bhupatindra Malla, likely commissioned by his son Ranajit Malla.

Inside the stone Siddhi Vatsalā temple in the palace square of Bhaktapur is a small metallic bell which contains a short Newari inscription. The inscription reads "...may all be fortunate, after performing a siddhāgni kotyāhuti yagya, Sri Sri Bhupatindra Malla offered this bell inside the stone temple on the first day of Bhadra of Nepal Sambat 835....". It is clear that Bhupatindra Malla organized a siddhāgni kotyāhuti yagya in order to offer an extremely small metallic bell, the same type of yagya done to commemorate the construction of the Nyatapola temple. As per historian Purushottam Shrestha, the reason for performing such complex ritual for the act of offering a small bell can be attributed to the plague epidemic that ravaged Nepal for seven years from 1716 to 1723. The bell however was offered on 3 September 1715, a few months before the plague epidemic which began around May 1716. However, months before the epidemic began affecting people, it had started to affect livestock and wild creatures. Contemporary chronicles mention the mysterious death of hundreds of cattle, poultry, pigs, wild hogs, deer, mice before the plague began. These deaths must have scared people of the kingdom who feared the same fate. With the hopes of preventing the epidemic, Bhupatindra Malla and his court performed a siddhāgni kotyāhuti yagya in order to offer a bell to Siddhi Vatsalā (Note: Vatsalā literally means loving mother in Sanksrit.) who is regarded as a powerful mother goddess.

The 18th century Plague epidemic was the most deadly epidemic in history of Nepal.

== Administrative details ==
=== Queen mother Lālamati ===
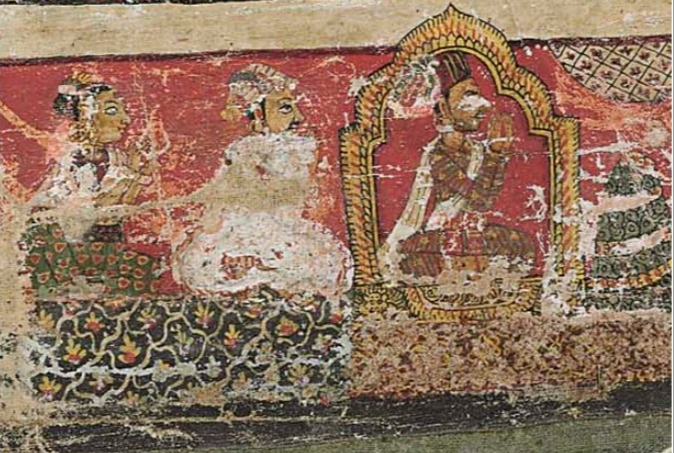
(from left to right) Miniature of Lālamati, Ugra Malla and Bhupatindra Malla from an 18th-century Paubha.

It appears that Lālamati Dévi (Nepal Bhasa: 𑐮𑐵𑐮𑐩𑐟𑐷 𑐡𑐾𑐰𑐷), Bhupatindra's mother, was his main helper during his reign. She appears as a witness in all treaties and legal documents involving the royal court. Lālamati is referred as Rājamātā (meaning queen mother), in inscriptions and legal documents. An example of this comes from a section of a legal document from 26 December 1714 about Bhupatindra Malla selling land to a person named Kalyana Simha:

... In the presence of Rājamātā Sri Sri Lālamati Dēvi and Sri Sri Ranajit Malla, the royal astrologer Jayanarayana wrote (this document) to Kalyana Simha.

During the reign of his father Jitamitra, the chief minister Bhagiram Pradhananga (colloquially Bhāju Kasa) became popular and even claimed himself to be the most skilled in the kingdom after the king. His rapid popularity spawned rumors that he was planning to assassinate the young prince Bhupatindra and claim the throne for himself. After the coronation of Bhupatindra however, Bhāju Kasa disappears from records. Moreover, Bhupatindra's chief minister Hāku Vāro (colloquially Hāku Bhāju) also didn't serve him throughout his reign, unlike the case of his father. It appears that Bhupatindra became more biased towards his mother Lālamati, particularly because he wanted to avoid his minister gaining as much power and popularity as Bhāju Kasa did during the reign of his father. Lālamati appears as a witness in all royal cases since the reign of Bhupatindra. Lālamati helped her son greatly during his reign, especially in political issues. Lālamati outlived both her husband and her son and died in the second year of her grandson's reign. Even after their death, Lālamati consecrated gold-plated statues of Jitamitra Malla and she set up a Guthi land to light oil lamps for Taleju in the name of her deceased son.

=== Hāku Bhāro ===
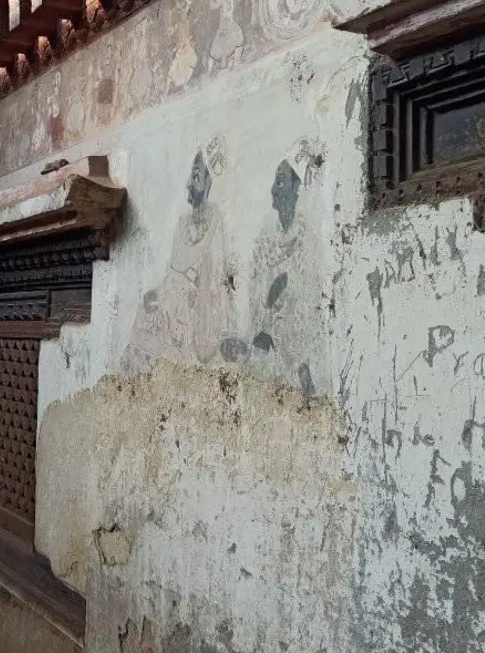
c. 18th century fresco of Hāku Bhāju sitting behind Bhupatindra Malla, highly damaged presently.

Hāku Bhāro, colloquially Hāku Bhāju (Note: Bhāju is a polite or respectful way of addressing a man in Newari.) was the chief minister in Bhupatindra Malla's court. Hāku Bhāro replaced Bhāgirāma Kāyastha (colloquially known as Bhāju Kasa) (Note: The name Bhāgirāma Kāyastha is rarely used among the people of Bhaktapur who mostly refer to him as Bhāju Kasa, where Bhāju is a Newar term used to show respect to a man while Kasa is a corrupt form of Kāyastha.), who was the minister in Jitamitra Malla's court. Soon after he took tenure in 1676, Bhāju Kasa's fame started to grow among was the people of Bhaktapur. An inscription form Khaumā district in Bhaktapur mentions:

Hail the learned and patient king Jitamitra Malla who is the greatest in the kingdom. After him, the intelligent minister Bhāgirāma is the greatest.

— Jitamitra Malla's inscription at a temple in Khaumā district, Bhaktapur,

Meanwhile, Lakshmi Narayana Joshi, the minister of Kantipur became jealous of Bhāju Kasa's influence and fame in Bhaktapur. So, the kingdom of Kantipur warned Jitamitra Malla of an attack if Bhāju Kasa was not removed from office. Jitamitra Malla couldn't remove Bhāju Kasa due his immense popularity among the locals. As a result, the forces of Kantipur surrounded the western gate of Bhaktapur for about a month after which they ransacked Bhāju Kasa's property. Bhāju Kasa then fled away to Lalitpur. There Yog Narēndra Malla, the king of Lalitpur found Bhāju Kasa innocent and convinced Lakshmi Narayana Joshi to reinstall him the court of Jitamitra Malla.

After returning to office, Bhāju Kasa's popularity grew even more, perhaps surpassing that of Jitamitra Malla. This immense popularity was the probable source of a folklore in Bhaktapur. It accounts that Bhāju Kasa assisted the youngest queen of Jitamitra Malla attempted to usurp the throne. Firstly, in order to gain the trust of the queen, Bhāju Kasa made a large rectangular pond overnight in western Bhaktapur. The pond is named Bhājyā Pūkhū after Bhāju Kasa himself and had a Shiva temple in the middle. Then after gaining her trust, the two of them plotted to murder a young Bhupatindra Malla. They convinced two assassins to kill the young prince in a nearby forest. The assassins however couldn't kill the pleading young prince and left him in the forest. Bhupatindra Malla would later be picked by a family of Tibetan artisans who raised him until adolescence and taught him his true identity. Bhupatindra Malla returns to Bhaktapur where due his popularity gathers his own army and storms the palace. His usurping stepmother is imprisoned within the palace while Bhāju Kasa is taken to a forest near the western gates of Bhaktapur where he is executed.

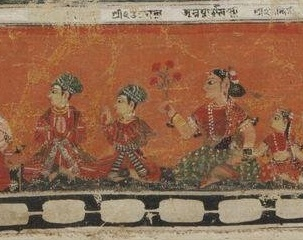
Miniature of Annapurna Lakshmi and her daughter Nandini (right side). Seated ahead of her are a young Jitamitra and a young Ugra Malla. Detail of a Paubha dated 1670, presently at the Victoria and Albert Museum. Annapurna Lakshmi was Bhupatindra Malla's great-grandaunt who had a big influence in government affairs from 1667 to 1676.

Despite being a popular folklore, it has no historical basis. Not only are there no records of Jitamitra Malla's queen apart from Lālamati, a young Bhupatindra Malla is depicted in a few contemporary paintings and there are ledgers books of various ceremonies of a young Bhupatindra Malla. Although it is unclear how a popular figure such as Bhāju Kasa was antagonized in folklore. Before, Bhāju Kasa took office, legal documents contained Annapurna Lakshmi, Bhupatindra Malla's great-grandaunt, as the witness. Her name first appeared in a legal document from 30 December 1667 during the reign of Jagat Prakasha Malla, Bhupatindra Malla's grandfather. She was the first female to appear as a witness in a legal document in Bhaktapur's history. From 1667 to 1676, Annapurna Lakshmi's name appeared as a witness in legal documents.

=== Queen Vishva Lakshmi ===
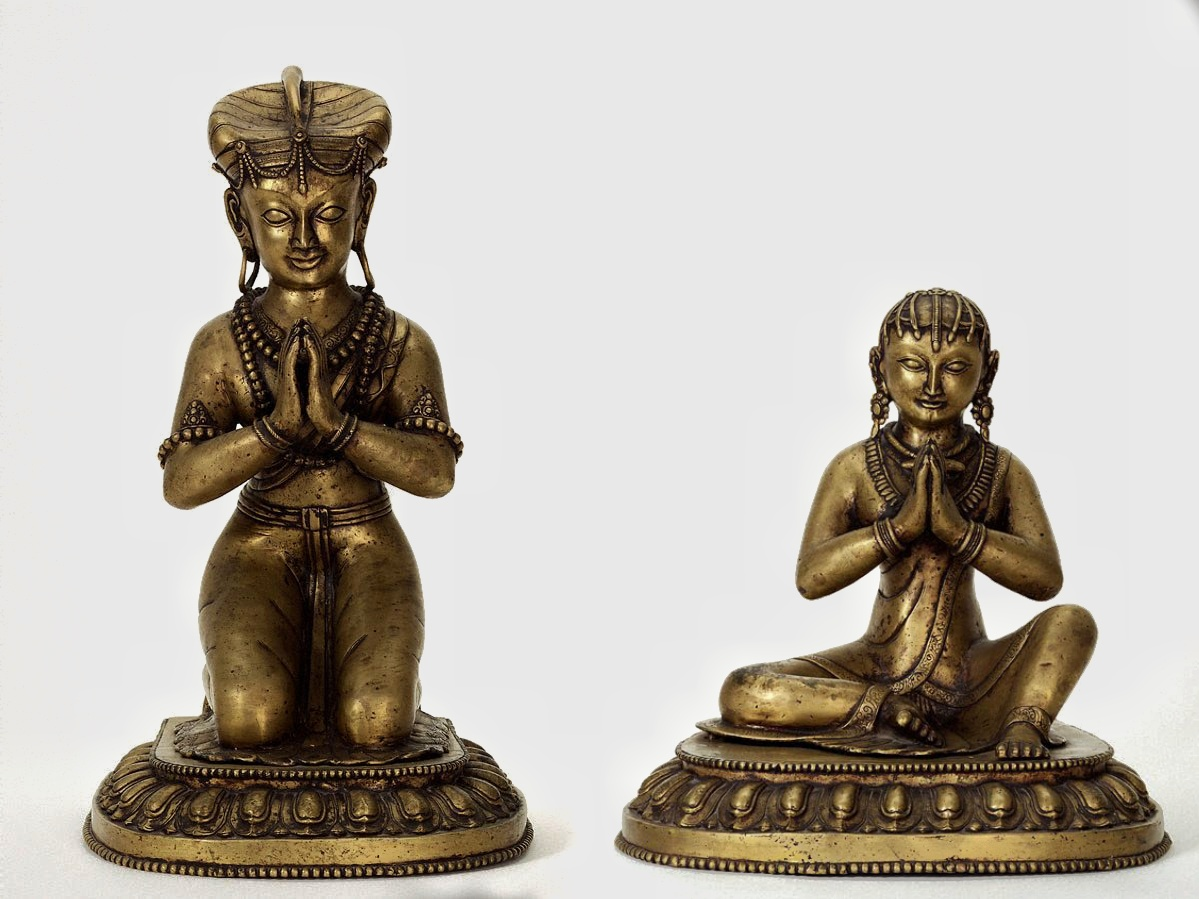
Bronze portrait of Bhupatindra Malla and his queen, Art Gallery of New South Wales, 18th century.

Vishva Lakshmi doesn't appear much in legal documents, treaties and there are no mentions of her in anything related to the politics of the valley. (Note: It could also be because many Malla era hand-written books and chronicles in Bhaktapur were stored in a part of the palace called Sāfukuthi. Literally meaning library, the building was burnt in the Battle of Bhaktapur. According to local belief, the fire lasted for seven days and destroyed all the books and documents of that building.) Vishva Lakshmi however is known to have supported her husband in the numerous construction works, particularly the palace of fifty-five windows and the Nyatapola temple. Queen Vishva Lakshmi supported her husband in many of his ambitious construction works. According to some folklore, the tall Nyatapola Temple was commissioned by the Queen herself. The story says that once the Queen noticed her husband King Bhupatindra Malla gazing at a woman every morning. Since the woman lived near the palace, she and the king would talk with each other from their rooftops. When the queen noticed them, she started to worry that the gazers might fall in love with each other. So, she requested her husband to construct a tall temple dedicated to Goddess Siddhi Lakshmi, that will calm the angry Bhairava (Note: Next to the Nyatapola Temple's current location, there is a three-storey temple dedicated to Bhairava which originally only had two storeys. According to a folklore, when Bhupatindra Malla added another storey in the temple, Bhairava was angered for being disturbed and started to wreak havoc on the society. So, it is said that the king built an even taller temple dedicated to Siddhi Lakshmi to calm the angry god.) while secretly hoping that it would block the view of the woman's house from the palace.

=== Ugra Malla ===
Ugra Malla (official name Sri Sri Jaya Ugra Malla Deva) was Bhupatindra's uncle who assisted him during the early years of his reign especially in political matters. Ugra Malla was equally active and ruled alongside his brother and Bhupatindra's father, Jitamitra Malla. Ugra Malla was featured with his brother in most paintings of Jitamitra. Ugra Malla died c. 1708. He was colloquially referred as mēlamhā jūjū.

== Construction of the Nyatapola temple ==
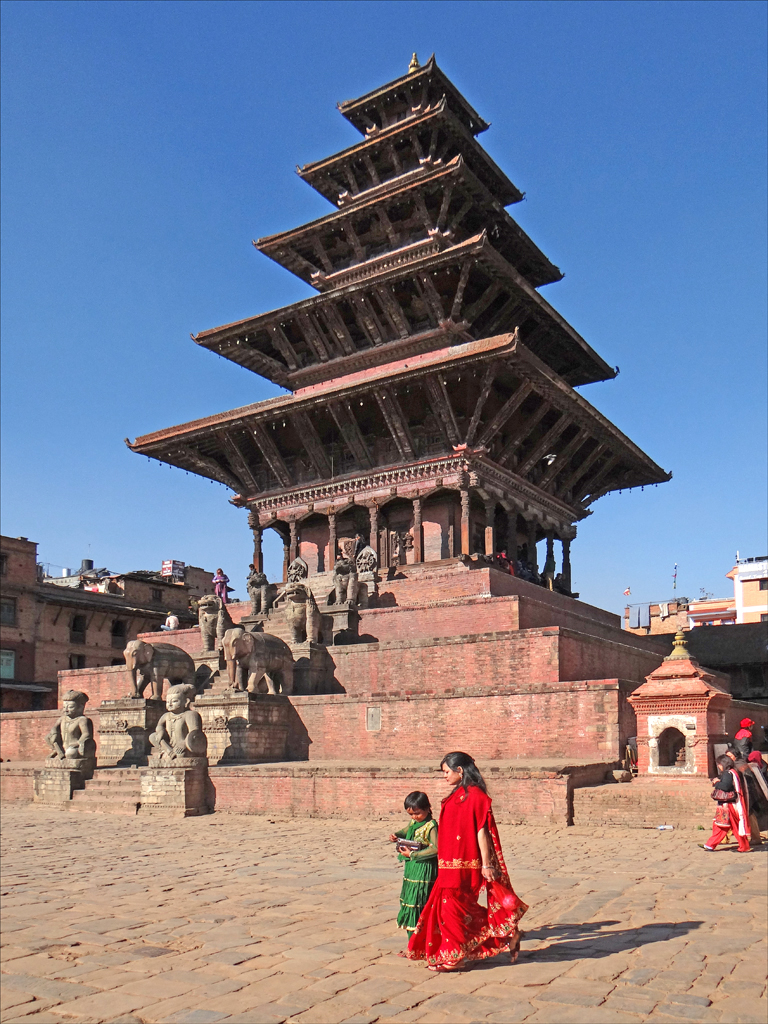
The Nyatapola temple, commissioned by Bhupatindra Malla was constructed within a time period of six months and is considered his greatest contribution.

The Nyatapola temple is the tallest building in Bhaktapur and holds a great cultural significance to the locals despite being off limits. The square that houses this temple is the most important area of the town. Likewise, the Nyatapola is the tallest in Nepal as well and is considered the greatest contribution by Bhupatindra Malla. The construction of the temple was completed in six months.

Before the construction of the Nyatapola temple, the tallest building in Bhaktapur was a Shiva temple in the palace complex. The Shiva temple also features a five-level platform similar to the Nyatapola. So, it is possible that Bhupatindra Malla may have used the Shiva temple as a base when drawing the architectural drawing for the temple. It was said that Bhupatindra Malla was skilled in woodcarving and Vastu shastra and the maps for the temple were made by him with the help of other experts. Similarly, before the Nyatapola was constructed there existed a temple referred as "Ngātapūlū" in the "Siddhāgni koṭyāhuti devala pratishṭhā" manuscript. Even before the construction began formally, the woodcarving and sculpting work had started. In the "Siddhāgni koṭyāhuti devala pratishṭhā" manuscript, it is written that a stone mason, Tūla Simha, worked for 499 days. Similarly, another worker, Chatra Simha, worked for 285 days. However, the time it took from the laying of the foundation to completion of the construction took only six months. So, the stone work and woodcarving began two years before the foundation was laid.

As per the sources, on 23 October 1701, Bhupatindra Malla invited his ministers, chief courtiers and the rest of the administrative division of Bhaktapur in his palace where he proposed his plans build the Nyatapola Temple.

As soon as the decision to build the temple was made by the meeting, preparations for construction started. Trees were cut in the forests surrounding Bhaktapur and the very next day on 24 October, Bhaktapur received wood from Banepa and woodwork for the temple began. Similarly, on Sunday 27 October 1702, Bhupatindra Malla, in order to prepare the various types of bricks, gave his ministers about 244 mots 1 suki money as advance and the purchasing of bricks also began. Bhaktapur continuously received wood from the surrounding areas and by mid-November 1702, the work for 529 fyé gān (small bells hung in the roof that ring with the wind) began as well.

It seems that there was already a temple called "Ngātāpulu" in the manuscripts, which once occupied the same space as the Nyatapola. By late December, the Ngātāpulu temple was destroyed and some of the surrounding houses were demolished in order to make space for the big temple. The house owners were given land in the eastern part of the town and the locale is today named Pālikhéla (lit. 'ground given in exchange '). However, one of these owners was saddened by the loss of his ancestral home and to show his sadness authored the Ramayana titled Dukhi Vāro and the play was shown around the town. The digging work for the foundation of the temple was completed by late December 1701. Bhupatindra Malla himself laid three bricks on the foundation thereby commencing the construction work. The construction work gained further momentum as almost all the citizens of Bhaktapur came to volunteer. Likewise, citizens of Thimi, Banepa, Dhulikhel and other smaller settlements under the Kingdom of Bhaktapur, the citizens from the Kingdom of Patan also volunteered in the construction. By early February 1703, the construction of the plinth was completed. The construction was halted temporarily in April for the Bisket Jatra festival. The construction work accelerated after the end of the festival and by the end of April, the lowermost storey was finished.

In early May, Bhupatindra Malla started a Yagya called Siddhāgni koṭyāhuti Māhāyagya. The fire for the Yagya was continuously lit for 48 days while the ashes from the fire were kept on the spot until January 1704. Even today, the spot where the Yagya was performed is believed to have retained the warmth till date. The construction of the temple was completed after a few months in the year 822 of the Nepalese era during the first day of the waxing moon in the month of Ashadha (late June–early July 1702).

All in all, it took six months to build the temple. When construction finished, a grand feast was organized by a grateful Bhupatindra Malla and almost 20,000 people attended.

Bhupatindra may have also authored the "Siddhāgni Kotyāhuti Dévala Pratisthā", manuscript detailing the construction work of the Nyatapola temple with the details of the cost of the construction, the timeline of the construction, names of the workers who worked on it including their work time and wages.

=== Bhupatindra Malla and Vétāla ===
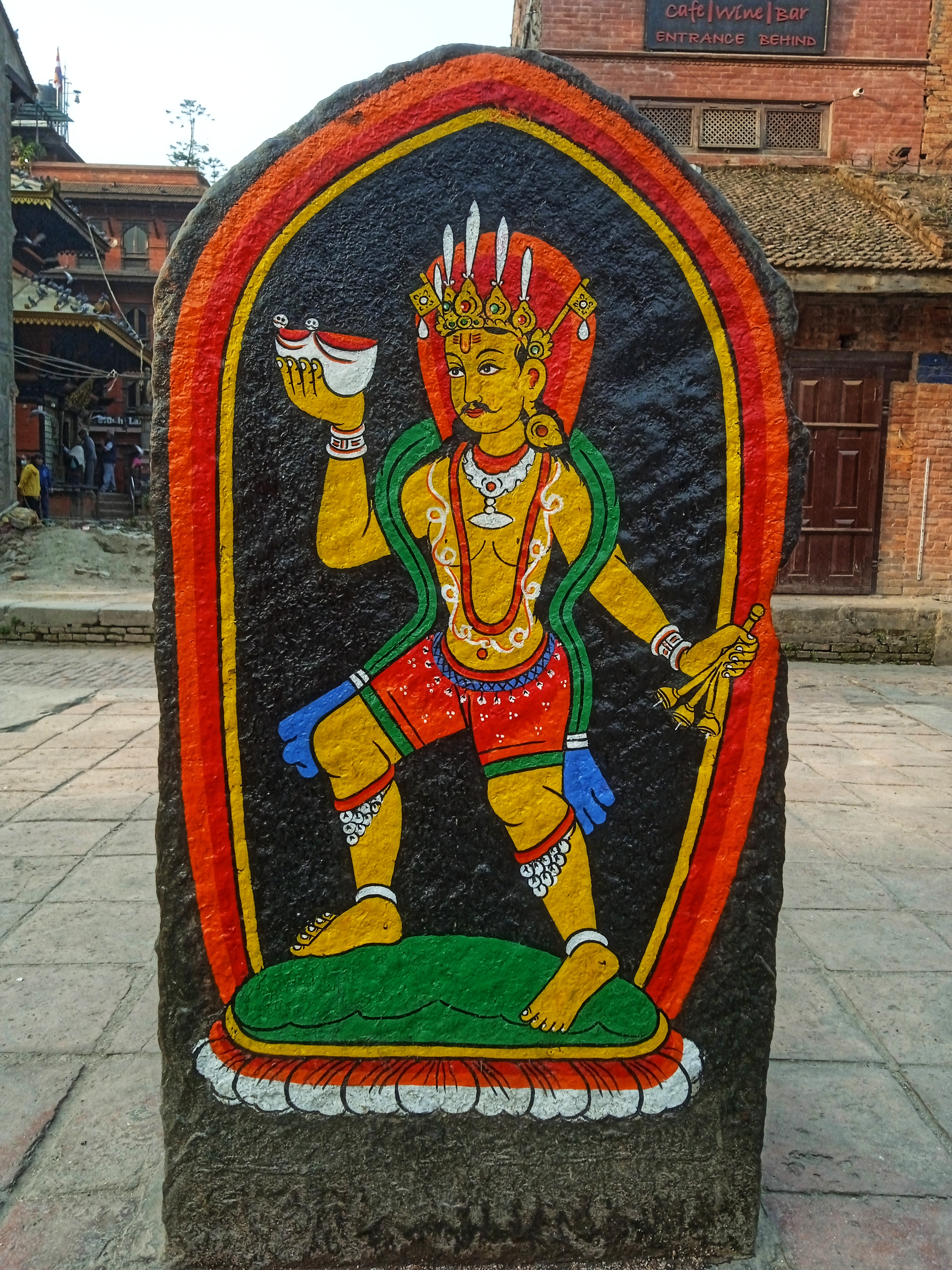
Paubha of Vétāla on a stone platform in front of the Nyatapola temple.

Vira Vétāla (Nepal Bhasa: 𑐰𑐷𑐬 𑐰𑐾𑐟𑐵𑐮), also commonly called Vétadyah (Nepal Bhasa: 𑐰𑐾𑐟 𑐡𑑂𑐫𑑅) is considered the vahana of Bhairava in Bhaktapur and is a popular deity in Bhaktapur. Although he is depicted with a moustache, Vétāla is believed to be a mischievous child. Vétāla is worshipped as the protector of Bhaktapur and of Bhairava. A statue of Vétāla is installed in front of the chariot of Biska Jatra. He is also believed to appear frequently in locales around the Nyatapola temple as a child during the time of the Biska Jatra festival. A folklore prevalent in Bhaktapur tell the tale of a worker who attended the construction of the Nyatapola temple daily, did no work but ate the most lunch. When the other workers noticed him, they quickly reported to Bhupatindra Malla but the king consoled the workers by saying that "he will be of some use, some day". Eventually, when the time came to install the heavy golden pinnacle on the top of the temple, the same worker who did no work before, quickly grabbed the heavy pinnacle and installed it on the top with ease. The man is then said to have disappeared and was never seen again. So, he was believed to be Vétāla himself.

Similarly, a child is said to have warned Bhupatindra Malla of an approaching attack on Bhaktapur, which eventually turned out to be true. Therefore, the forces of Bhaktapur easily repelled it. The child was then revealed to be Vétāla himself and for saving his kingdom from foreign attack, Bhupatindra Malla is said to have gifted Vira Vétāla a golden jewellery. Vétāla then happy with his gift, is said to have given the kingdom a golden statue of Bhairava which was kept in the Bhairava temple located near the Nyatapola. Unfortunately, the statue was stolen from the temple in 1947.

== Legacy ==
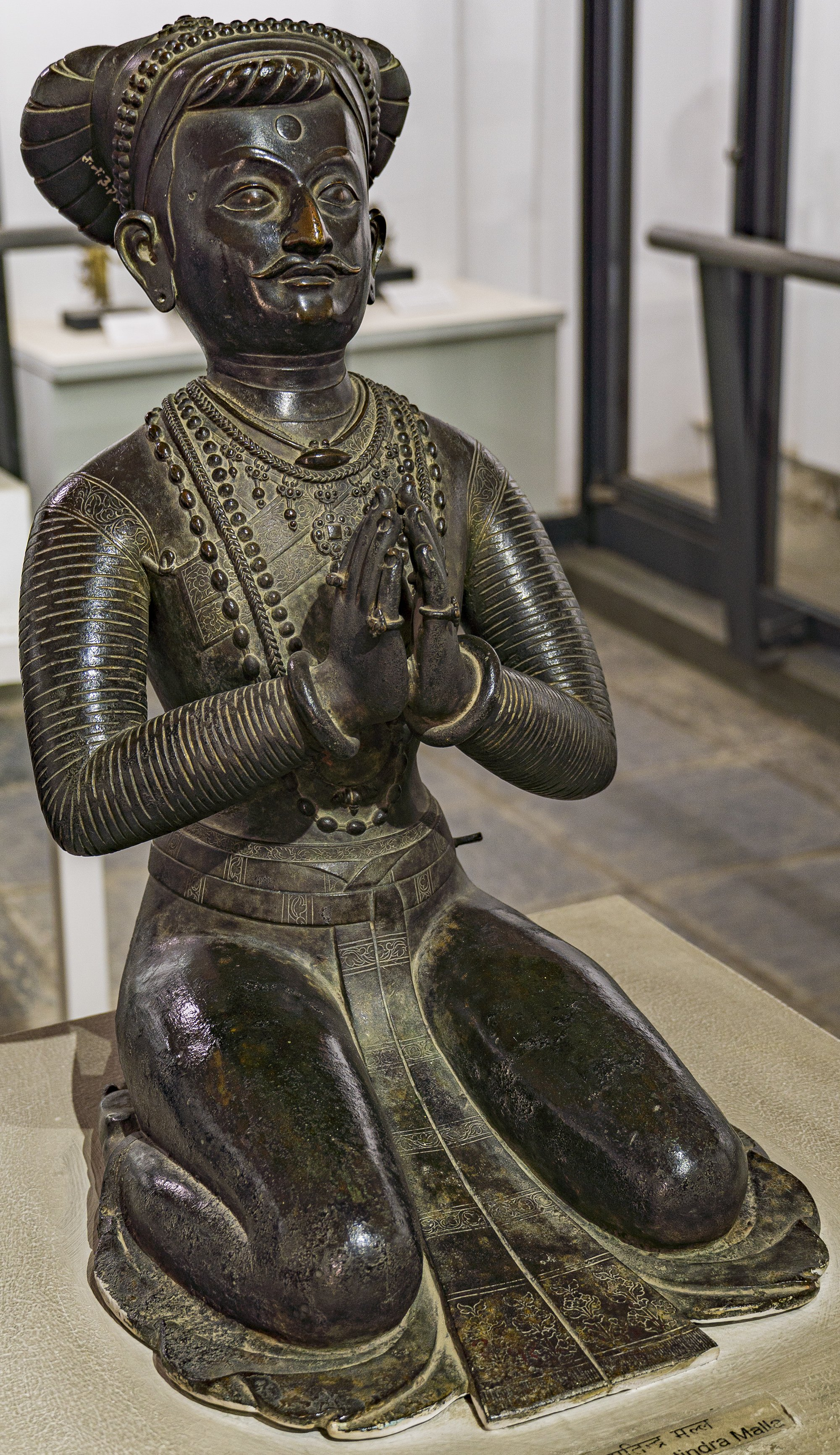
Bronze statue of Bhupatindra Malla seated in Vajrasana and Añjali Mudrā at the National Museum of Nepal, c. 18th century

Bhupatindra Malla's reign is considered a golden one in Bhaktapur as it saw the construction of much of the city's iconic and important heritage. He is considered Bhaktapur's greatest patron of arts. Bhupatindra Malla began his construction works even before he was crowned as evidenced by his renovation of a hiti in the royal palace and also a construction of one in Thimi along with a phalcha (resting place) as a prince.

=== The palace of fifty-five windows ===
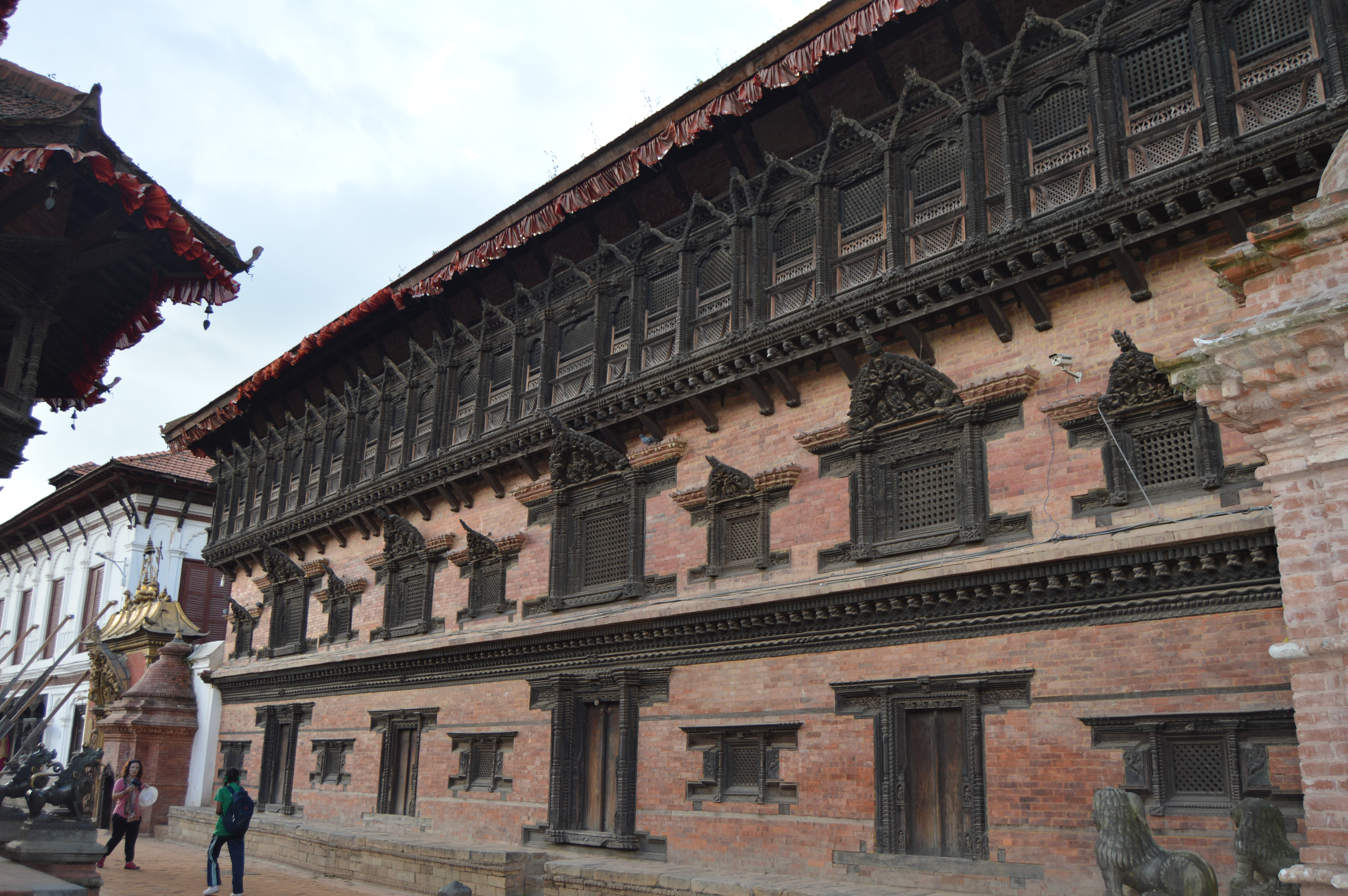
The southern façade of the palace of 55 windows at the Durbar square of Bhaktapur.

The palace of fifty five windows (Nepal bhasa: 𑐒𑐾𑐒𑐵𑐥𑐵𑐗𑑂𑐫, ngé ngāpā jhya) was the remodeling of a palace first constructed by King Jayayakshya Malla which was damaged in the earthquake of 1681. Bhupatindra later remodeled the palace with fifty-five windows and today is considered a great example of Nepalese woodcarving. There is one misconception that Bhupatindra Malla built the palace with fifty-five windows to provide one for each of his fifty-five wives. However, there isn't much evidence to support this as Bhupatindra likely only had a single queen. Moreover, the palace was likely made for musical purposes as supported by the recent discoveries of 147 carvings of musical rāgas and their names on the cornice separating the ground floor and the first floor of the palace.

The construction of this palace was completed in 1708 after which Bhupatindra Malla had a Chitrakar paint frescoes on the second floor. The walls on the second floor of the palace are painted with Paubha paintings depicting various religious scenes and the portraits of the royal figures. The central fresco contains a portrait of Vishvarupa and his consort. The Vishvarupa has multiple layers of head while the mythical Mount Meru forms the background. The central head of the Vishvarupa has the face of Bhupatindra Malla. On one of the eyebrows of the figure, the snake king and his army of serpents is seated. Similarly, on the two shoulders of the Vishvarupa stand Ganesha and Kumara while the chest of the Vishvarupa contains a scene from the Ramayana where Rama and his allies are seated in a golden chariot and are fighting a ten headed Ravana and his army. A lotus plant sprouts from the navel of the Vishvarupa, where the creator deity Brahma is seated. Brahma is being attacked by demon forces of Madhu and Kaitavya and is being defended by Shiva and his divine army. Similarly, the Vishvarupa is embracing a female figure who has a white complexion and a distinctive nevus on her chin, identifying her as Queen Vishva Lakshmi. Similarly, her ribbon which forms an elaborate headwear contains the word 'Sri Bhupatindra' written in the Newari script, further identifying her as Bhupatindra's queen. Vishva Lakshmi is embracing her consort with her left arm while her right arm which holds a golden cup, contains a gold bangle the upper part of which has been modified into the figure of a blue coloured Bhairava and his consort Bhairavi. The Vishvarupa painting although heavily damaged has been described as the epitome of Nepalese painting and one of the rarest in the world. Historian Purushottam Lochan Shrestha further writes that:

If this fresco was painted in the walls of a European palace or in the Louvre instead of a poor and unknown country like Nepal, it would have been considered one of the greatest paintings in the world.

The other important paintings include one of a young Ranajit Malla riding a horse along with Bhupatindra himself on an elephant back, painting of a princess, probably Bhupatindra's daughter, a portrait of Bhupatindra Malla and a king of Makwanpur hunting in the Terai forest and a large painting of a Vishvarupa embracing a female figure, with the faces of Bhupatindra and his queen Vishva Lakshmi. Besides these there are still more unrecognisable paintings of royal figures and many more depicting religious scenes from the Mahabharata, Ramayana and the Krishna Leelā.

There is also a small inscription among the frescoes which details the artist who painted them. Unfortunately, the part where the artist's name is written has worn off and the only readable part of the inscription tells that the artist was a Chitrakar from Yāché tole (name of a locale), Bhaktapur.

This palace was damaged by the earthquake of 1934; the top floor was entirely destroyed. Like most reconstruction at that time, the palace of fifty-five windows was reconstructed haphazardly. As a result, the windows on the top floor which previously protruded out of the façade forming a balcony like structure were simply plastered to the façade and European style roof tiles were used instead of the Nepalese traditional ones. In the 19th century, the palace was used as for administrative purposes including a post office and as such the frescoes in the second floor were greatly damaged and covered in soot, ink and glue stains making them unrecognisable. After the administrative offices were shifted in the 1980s, the West German government funded committee studied the frescos in the palace and the frescoes were cleaned by them, although some of the damage was irreversible. Similarly, in 2006 the city government of Bhaktapur renovated the entire palace; the European roof tiles were replaced with the traditional pōla appāh and the top floor windows were renovated as a balcony . Although the renovation was not perfect as the top floor windows in the western and eastern façade still lack the floral tympanum it once had and the wooden struts supporting them were once decorated with the images of various deities but now are plain wood.

=== Simhādhwākhā Lyākū and Mālati Chōka ===
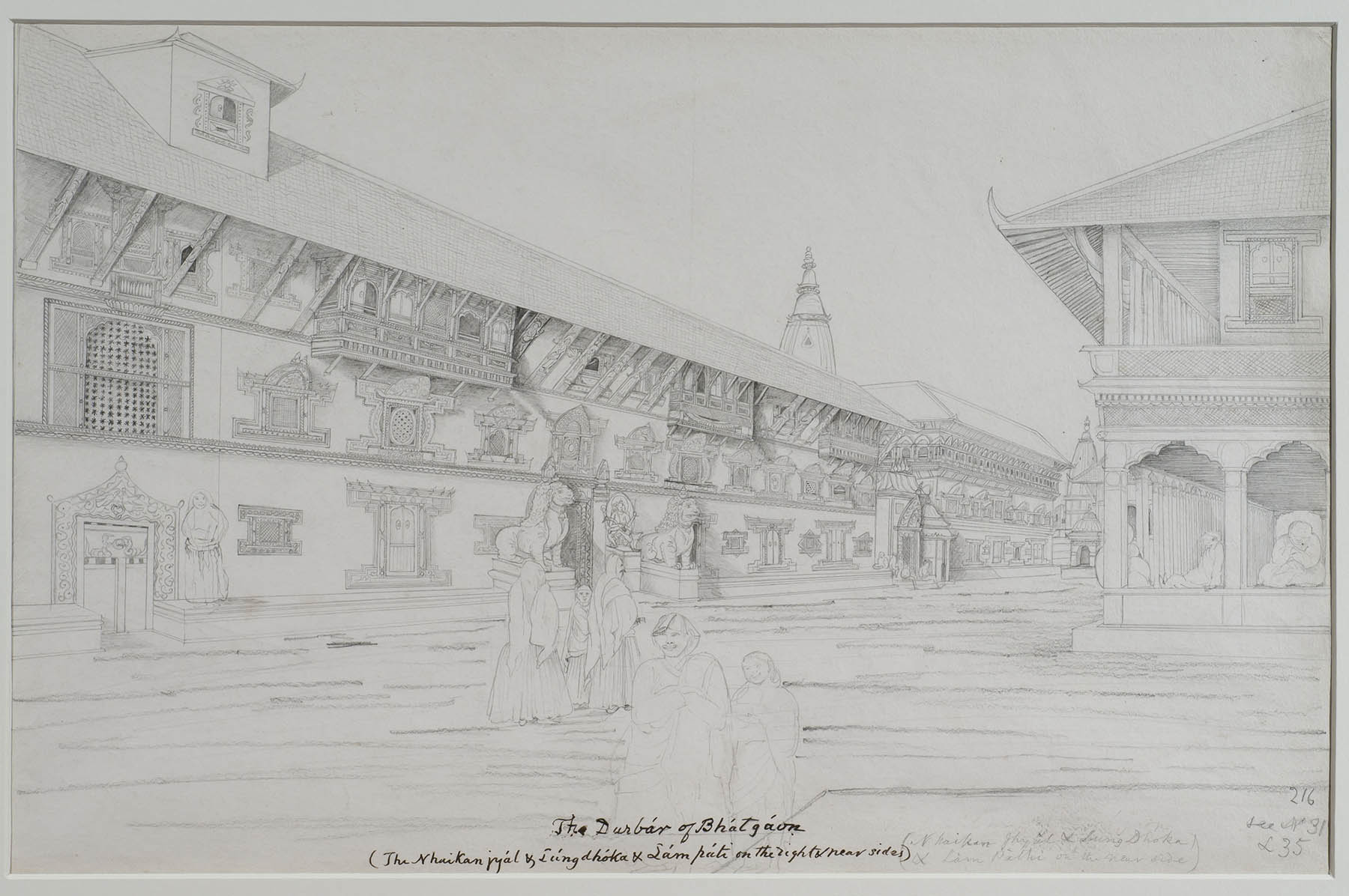
Sketch of the Simhādhwākhā palace in its traditional look, dated 1844 by local artist Raj Man Singh Chitrakar.

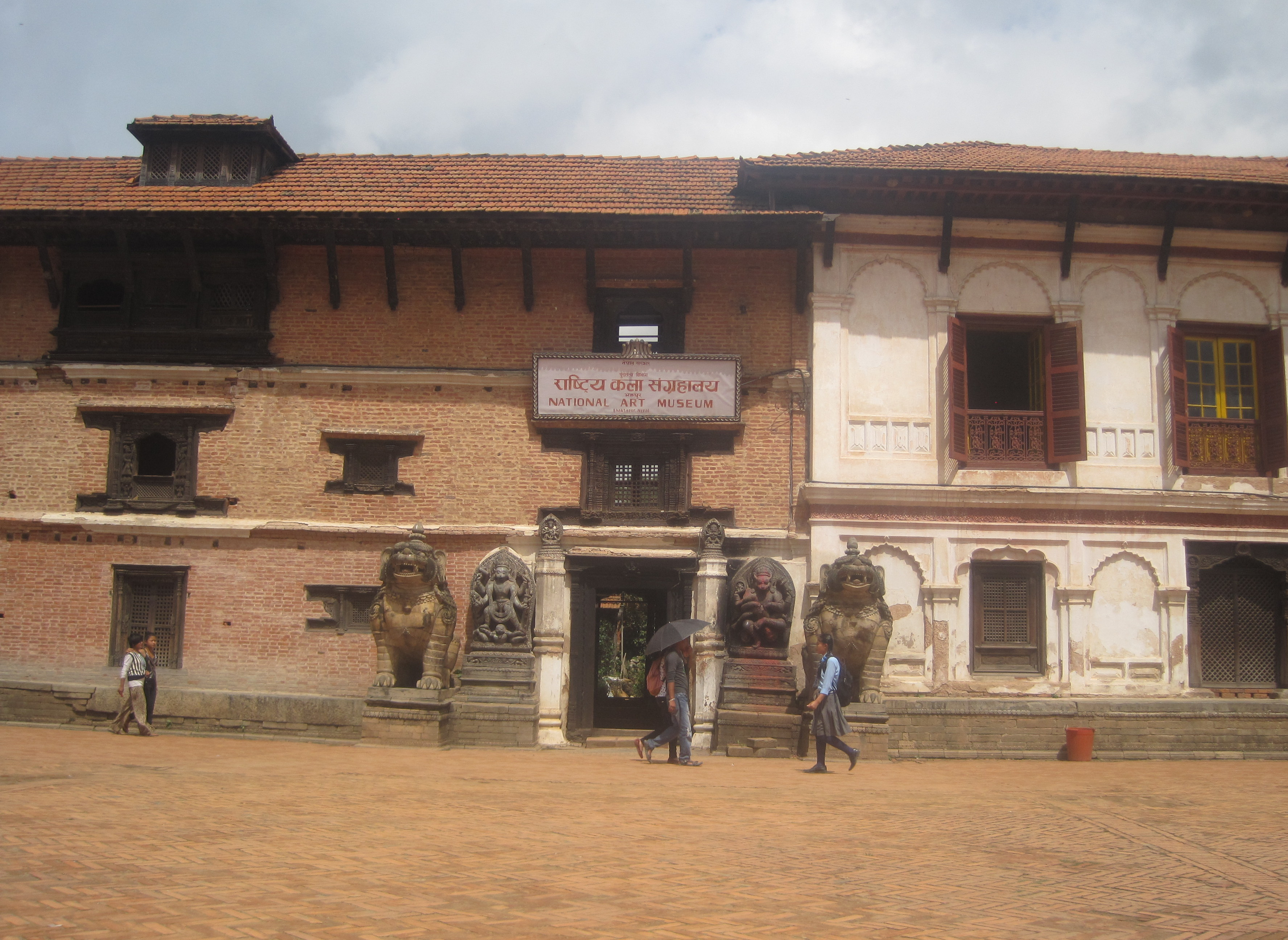
The Simhādhwākhā Durbar in its present form.

This palace was the main residence of the royals of Bhaktapur and is attributed to Bhupatindra Malla. The construction of the palace was completed in Nepal Sambat 818 and was named as 'Mālatichok Durbar'. However, the locals referred to the palace Simhādhwākhā Lyākū (Note: Lyākū is Newari term for a royal palace.) (Nepal Bhasa: 𑐳𑐶𑑄𑐴𑐢𑑂𑐰𑐵𑐏𑐵 𑐮𑑂𑐫𑐵𑐎𑐸, lit. 'lion gated palace') after the two large stone images of guardian lions which were installed by Bhupatindra Malla as well. In the principal latticed window of this palace Bhupatindra Malla kept a glass pane which he received as a gift from a Mughal emperor and so the palace was also called Nhēkanjhya Lyākū (Nepal Bhasa: 𑐴𑑂𑐣𑐾𑐎𑐒𑐗𑑂𑐫 𑐮𑑂𑐫𑐵𑐎𑐸, lit. 'palace with glassed window'). It is very likely that this palace was a remodeled version of a previously existing palace which was probably damaged by an earthquake in 1681. The southern façade of Simhādhwākhā Lyākū palace was adorned with latticed windows with tympanums. The palace also featured a glassed latticed window right above the main portal on the second floor. Glass was extremely rare in Nepal until the 20th century (Note: Even in 1877, Wright wrote that only the extremely wealthy had glass in their windows.) and the glass kept by Bhupatindra Malla became an object of wonder for the people.

==== The Nhékanjhya ====
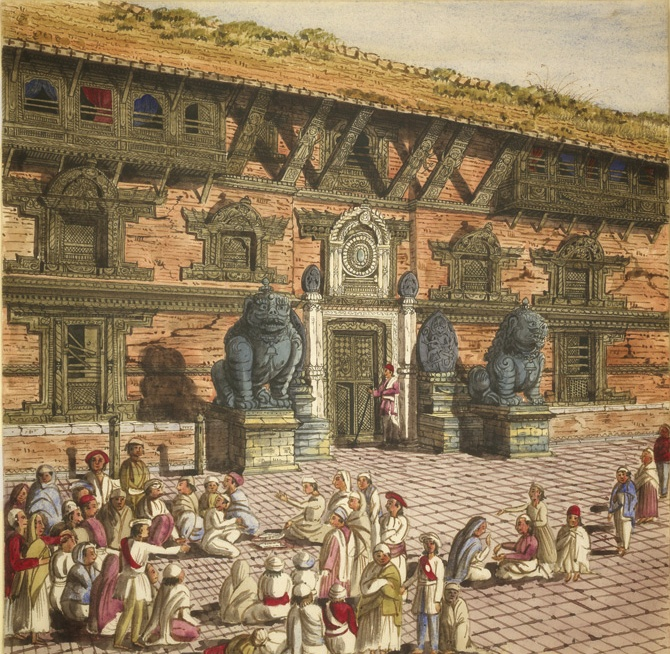
Detail of the mirrored lattice window, Nhēkanjhya on the front façade of Simhādhwākhā Durbar in 1853 by Oldfield.

Above the main entrance to the palace, there was a glassed lattice window which was locally known as "Nhékanjhya" (lit. 'glassed window'). Hence, the palace was also called "Nhékanjhya Lyākū". Bhupatindra Malla had received the pane of glass as a gift from a Mughal emperor. The glass was considered rare and valuable in Nepal at the time and was an object of wonder for the people and thus Bhupatindra Malla placed the glass pane on the principal latticed window of his palace for everyone to see. This window has often been dubbed as the first use of glass pane on a window in Nepal. Both the glass piece and the window itself were lost after the earthquake of 1934 destroyed the palace.

==== Hanuman and Narasimha ====
There are two large stone images of Narasimha and Hanuman beside the two large stone lions on the either side of the main portal to the interior of the palace. An inscription in the pedestal of these statues dates them to 9 February 1698 and attributes them to Bhupatindra Malla and his uncle Ugra Malla. Bhupatindra Malla and Ugra Malla set up Guthi and gave it the job of washing these statues with Ghee six times a year on the dates mentioned in the inscription.

==== Mālati Chōka ====
This palace also serves as an entrance to the Mālati Chōka courtyard. The courtyard is located behind the palace and is also credited to Bhupatindra Malla and is one of the few remaining of the 99 courtyards of the royal palace. The courtyard houses an important stone inscription, made by both Bhupatindra Malla and his father Jitamitra Malla which contains short descriptions of the festivals celebrated in Bhaktapur. The courtyard once housed a golden water spout (hiti in Newari) as well but it has been stolen. This hiti was also placed by Bhupatindra Malla along with gilt copper statues of Hindu deities. Unfortunately, the sculpture decorating the courtyard has been stolen as well. Bhupatindra Malla also built a single-storey temple with a gold-plated roof in the courtyard which was destroyed during the earthquake of 1934 and was not reconstructed.

==== Demolition of Simhādhwākhā Lyākū palace ====
Unfortunately, this palace no longer retains its original appearance. The palace was completely demolished by Dhir Shumsher Rana and inspired by his brother's trip to Britain remodeled it in a British style and named it "Lāl Baithak". The eastern half of the palace was completely remodeled while the western half retained some level of traditional look as some of the Newar latticed windows from the old palace were reused but the façade and the interiors were completely altered. (Note: Compare this picture by Raj Man Singh Chitrakar from 1844 to this painting by Oldfield from 1858.) The earthquake of 1934 destroyed the western half of the palace and was haphazardly reconstructed in its present form.

=== The temple of Bhairava ===
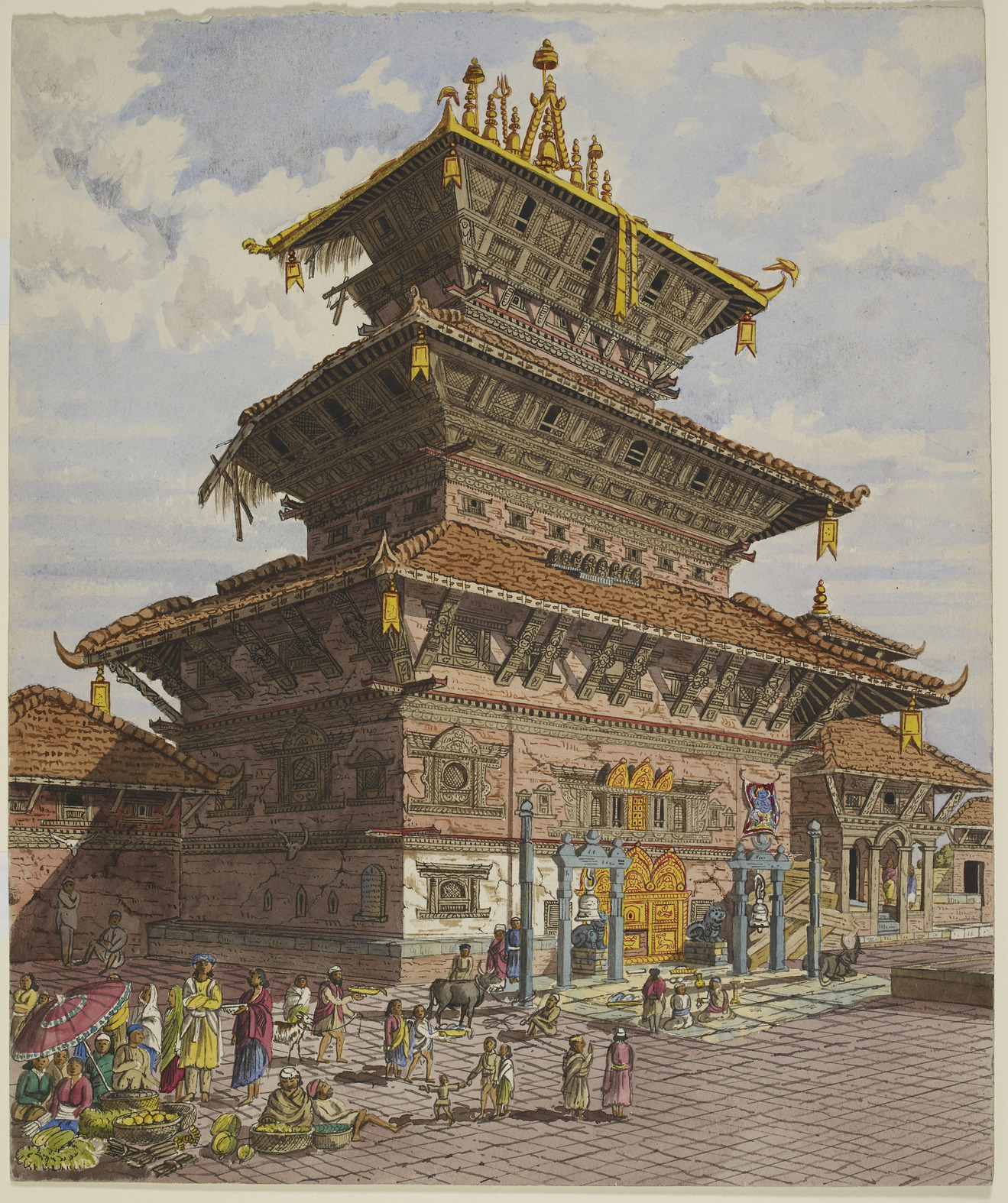
Watercolour of the Bhairava temple by Henry Ambrose Oldfield, 1853. This temple is of a great cultural and religious importance to the locals and its current appearance can be credited to Bhupatindra Malla.

The Bhairava temple, also referred as the Akasha Bhairava temple or the temple of Kashi Vishwanath Bhairava, next to the Nyatapola Temple is one of the most important buildings in Bhaktapur in terms of religion and culture. Its history dates to the 11th century and it was founded by Nirvayadéva, a Licchavi king, in 1005. Later, this temple was renovated by both Jagajjyoti Malla and Jagat Prakasha Malla, who also installed a statue of himself and his minister inside the temple.

Today, it is a three-storey edifice with a gilt roof on the top and its modern-day look can be credited to Bhupatindra Malla who with the help of this eldest son, Ranajit Malla enlarged the temple by adding two storeys to the initially single-storey temple and gilted the top roof with gold between 1716 and 1717. He also added seven golden pinnacles on the roof.

=== Nyatapola Temple ===
The Nyatapola temple is a pagoda-style temple commissioned by King Bhupatindra Malla and was constructed under a period of six months of the year 822 of Nepalese era(late 1702 to early 1703). Often considered the finest example of Nepalese architecture and craftsmanship, the Nyatapola temple is the tallest in Nepal. Dedicated to the Tantric goddess Siddhi Lakshmi, the inner parts of the temple is forbidden to everyone but the Karmāchārya priests that once served the Malla kings.

=== Works in the Taleju temple complex ===
The main courtyard of the palace square of Bhaktapur houses the shrine of Taleju, the tutelary goddess of the Malla kings. The courtyard is extremely secretive and is forbidden to foreigners. Similarly, the locals also have very limited access as they are also forbidden to enter any buildings inside the courtyard and photography is prohibited. Almost all the Malla kings were great devotee of the Devi and all the kings had installed at least one thing in the courtyard.

On 24 May 1705, Bhupatindra Malla offered Goddess Taleju a big metallic bell. In 1706 Bhupatindra Malla commissioned the renovation of the Taleju temple and also had the roof of the temple plated with gold. Similarly, he installed gilt-copper statues of Hanuman, dragons and other mythical creatures on the roof. He also installed eleven golden pinnacles on the roof of the temple. For the occasion of installing the golden pinnacles on the Taleju temple, a Nepal Bhasa play named "Vikram Charita", which he wrote himself was shown in the courtyard. Similarly, he offered Goddess Taleju a rare herb brought from Makwanpur that he referred to as Māhādeva vāsha (Nepal Bhasa: 𑐩𑐴𑐵𑐡𑐾𑐰 𑐰𑐵𑐳, lit. 'Shiva's Medicine') in an inscription. Bhupatindra Malla also offered his gold-plated statue to Goddesses Taleju which is taken out once a year during Vijayadashami along with the statutes of his queen and his parents.

In the walls of the northern building of the courtyard, he also commissioned a genealogical painting of his ancestors along with the painting of the sun and a hymn to the sun god. The Mallas and the Licchavis, who ruled before claimed to be the members of the solar dynasty and hence the painting features kings from both of these dynasties as devotees of the sun god. Unfortunately, many parts of the painting have been damaged irreversibly because of the smoke caused by cooking done by the soldiers who are housed inside the complex. Historian Tulasi Rāma Vaidya, who was among the few to have entered the buildings of the courtyard and is the one who reported about these paintings, wrote that:

the frescoes of the walls have been damaged due to the lapse of time, the negligence of ignorant people and smoke caused by foolish people.

Apart from the genealogical painting, there are wall paintings in almost all the buildings of the Taleju temple complex which mostly show royal and religious figures. Vaidya was also unable to recognise most of the royal figures and the few he was able to recognise belonged to Bhupatindra Malla and Ranajit Malla. Most of the paintings as Vaidya reported, has been heavily damaged.

=== Renovation of the Basantapur Lyākū ===
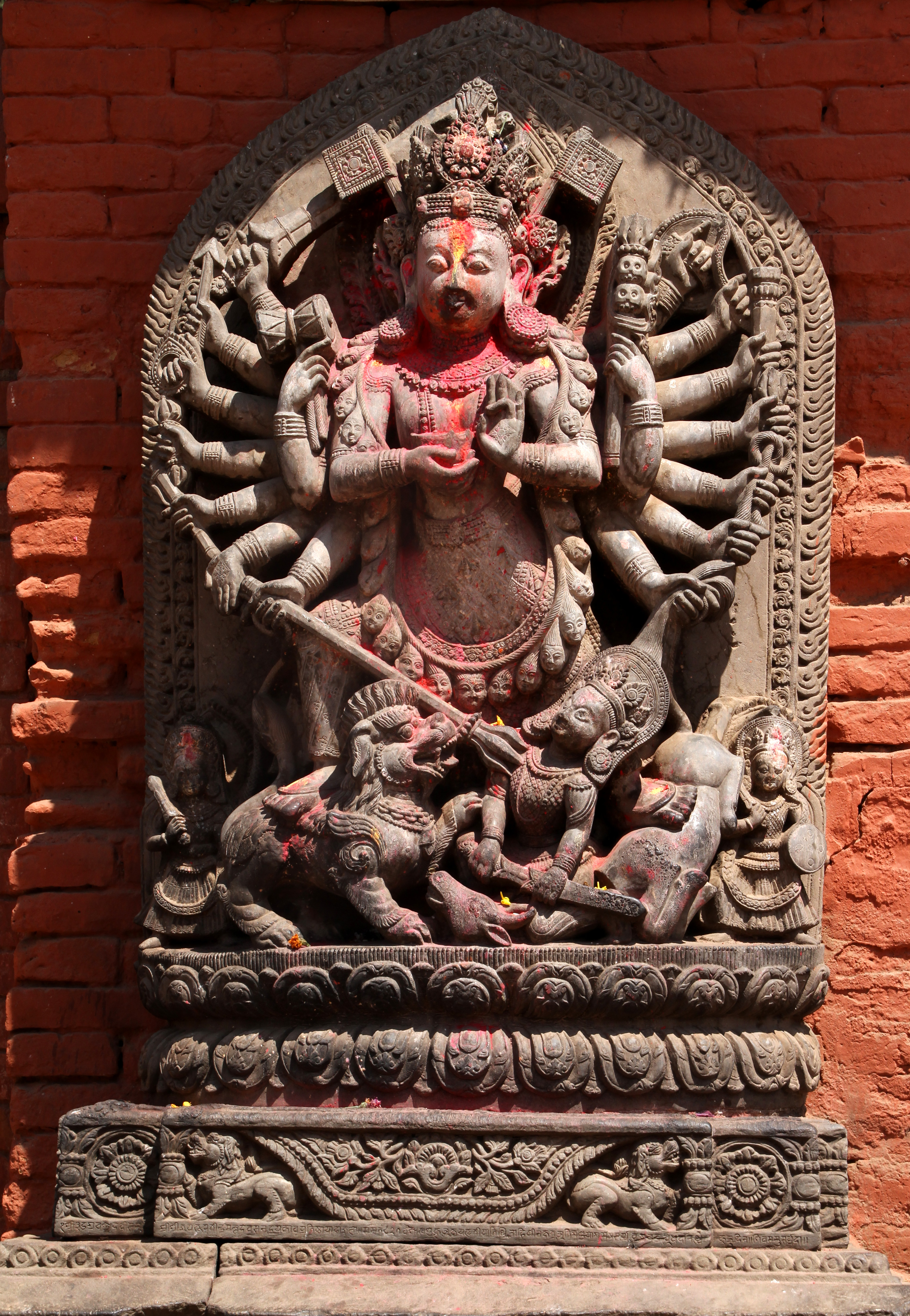
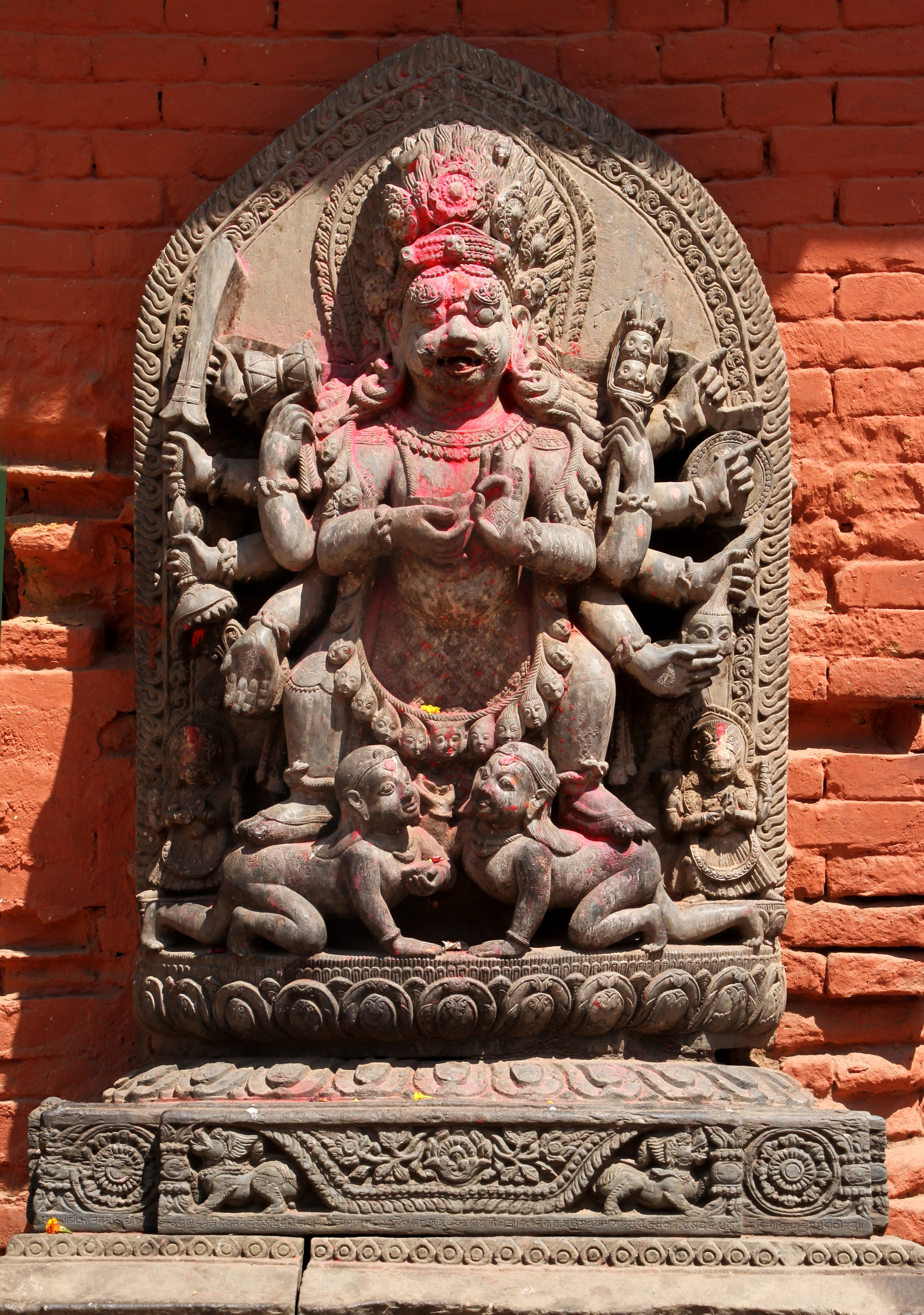
Stone images of Ugrachandi (right) and Ugrabhairava (left) on the either side of the entrance gate to the now destroyed Basantapur palace.

The nine-storey Basantapur Lyākū palace was once located on the western end of the Durbar Square of Bhaktapur. According to the chronicles gathered by historian Daniel Wright, Basantapur Lyākū was first constructed by King Jagat Prakasha Malla, the grandfather of Bhupatindra Malla, and was named "nakhachhe tavagola kwatha", meaning "a large fort meant for festivals". The nine-storey Basantapur was considered extremely tall during the Malla period as the average house then only had three storeys. Basantapur once occupied a large area and was filled with gardens and courtyards. As per a chronicle, it was decorated with expensive materials. Basantapur was also where people were taught music and dance and it also had numerous halls dedicated to them. This palace is sometimes cited as the inspiration for the Basantapur palace of Kathmandu that was built by King Prithivi Narayan Shah following the conquest of the Kathmandu Valley.

This palace seems to have been damaged due to an earthquake in 1681 but the renovation work is not credited to the then king, Jitamitra Malla. Instead, the damaged palace was renovated and repaired by Bhupatindra Malla. Although, Jitamitra Malla had started the renovation of other damaged buildings like the Chaukot Lyākū palace and the courtyard of the Kumari Chwōka, the later of which took 14 years to renovate. Bhupatindra Malla also added two large stone statues of Ugrachandi (a fierce manifestation of Dévi) and Ugrabhairava (a fierce form of Bhairava) on the either sides of the entrance to the palace in a similar manner to Simhadhwakha Lyākū. There is a common belief among the locals that Bhupatindra Malla found the statues of Ugrachandi and Ugrabhairava so artistic that he had the arms of the artisan, who made them cut off so that he wouldn't replicate the statues anywhere. Although, there was a fierce competition between the three kingdoms of the Kathmandu Valley in the field of arts, there is no real evidence to support that the artisan's hands were cut off. On the contrary, Bhupatindra Malla was known to honour artisans by rewarding them golden crown or other jewelleries along with their wages. Historian Om Dhaubhadel believes that the sculptor of these statues could be found with a proper research, particularly on the inner courtyards of the palace. These courtyards are highly restrictive to everyone but the priests. The inscriptions carved on the pedestal of these statues credit their establishment to Bhupatindra Malla and date them to 4 May 1706, suggesting the renovation of Basantapur Lyākū was completed around the same time as well. Similarly, Bhupatindra Malla had also added a large wooden tympanum on the entrance gate of the palace.

==== Downfall of the Basantapur palace ====
Today, only the statues of Ugrachandi-Ugrabhairava and two large stone images of guardian lions remain as the palace couldn't survive the lack of maintenance following the end of the Malla dynasty and the earthquakes of 1833 and 1934. The earthquake in 1833 destroyed the two uppermost floors of the palace. Similarly, Dhir Shumser Rana, the then magistrate for Bhaktapur during the Rana regime used the tympanum installed by Bhupatindra Malla on the entrance door and tympanum from the windows of the palace as firewood for cooking. The final blow to the palace was the earthquake of 1934 which completely destroyed the remaining portions of the palace. After the earthquake, the site of Basantapur palace was left empty and in 1947 a school was controversially shifted to there. The school still stands today above the foundation of the Basantapur.

Basantapur palace was reported to be 51.3 kū (Note: kū (hāt in Nepali) is a Nepalese measurement system of measuring length with one kū roughly equal to the length of the adult human arm.) tall (2 kū=1 yard and 1 yard=0.914 m) or roughly 23.3 m tall (76.4 ft).

=== Renovation of Nritya Vatsalā temple ===
Nritya Vatsālā is one of five Vatsālā temples located in Bhaktapur. All five of these Vatsalā temple are dedicated to Vatsalā Devi, a mother goddess. Two of the Vatsalā temples are made with stone and of Granthakuta style of architecture, similar to that of the Krishna Mandir in Lalitpur. The two temples, Nritya Vatsalā and Siddhi Vatsalā are locally referred as Lohan Déga, meaning "stone temple" in Newari and have plinths with sculpture of various animals as guardians. The other three were terracotta temples in the Granthakuta style of architecture as well but now all except one of these temples have lost their original style due to the earthquake of 1934.

Unlike the other four Vatsālā temples which were commissioned by Jitamitra Malla, the original builder of Nritya Vatsalā is uncertain, but most historians attribute it to Bhupatindra's grandfather, Jagat Prakasha Malla. The date at which the temple was built is also not known. What is known is that Bhupatindra Malla gifted goddess Vatsālā a metallic bell on 1 December 1700. The inscription in the bell mention that Bhupatindra Malla had this bell repaired on 26 February 1722. The bell is locally known as Khicākhogāṅ (= barking dog bell in English), since it is believed that the bell's noise makes the surrounding dogs bark. The bell was damaged in the great earthquake of 1934 and does not produce its original sound anymore. Similarly, a rock inscription found in the eastern outskirts of Bhaktapur mentions that Bhupatindra Malla, in order to build a stone temple in his father's name, gathered rock on the seventh day of Fālguna sudi of Nepal Sambat 835 (= March 1718). Moreover, Bhupatindra Malla also installed a Thā pujā (a type of ritual done on the Taleju temple in Bhaktapur after the completion of a special event) for the completion of a stone temple. So, the Nritya Vatsālā temple probably existed before the reign of Bhupatindra Malla and was renovated to its present form sometime between Nepal Sambat 835 and 841 (= 1718 and 1722).

=== Restoration of the Char Dham ===
The Char Dham is a group of four sacred Hindu sites that are scattered throughout the Indian subcontinent. Most Hindus take a pilgrimage to these sites at least once in their life. Seeing the religious importance of these sites, King Jayayakshya Malla established replicas of all four of the temples near his palace in the 15th century. The restoration of these sites were commissioned in the 18th century by Bhupatindra Malla.

=== Temples of Shiva ===
Bhupatindra Malla was a great devotee of Shiva. All of his paintings and statues depict him with a Tripundra, the Tilaka of Shiva. A Shiva temple that he erected in the royal palace complex contains the following inscription:

O thou whose lotus-feet are worshipped by gods and the king of gods, thou who art the husband of Gauri, the destroyer of Manmatha, and whose forehead is adorned with the moon! I dedicate the faculties of my mind to thy two lotus-feet. Be thou propitious to thy humble devotee Bhupatindra. On Saturday the 10th of Bhadon Sudi, Nepal Sambat 828, Bhupatindra Malla, to please his patron-goddess, placed Siva in this temple. May Sadasiva be gracious to him.

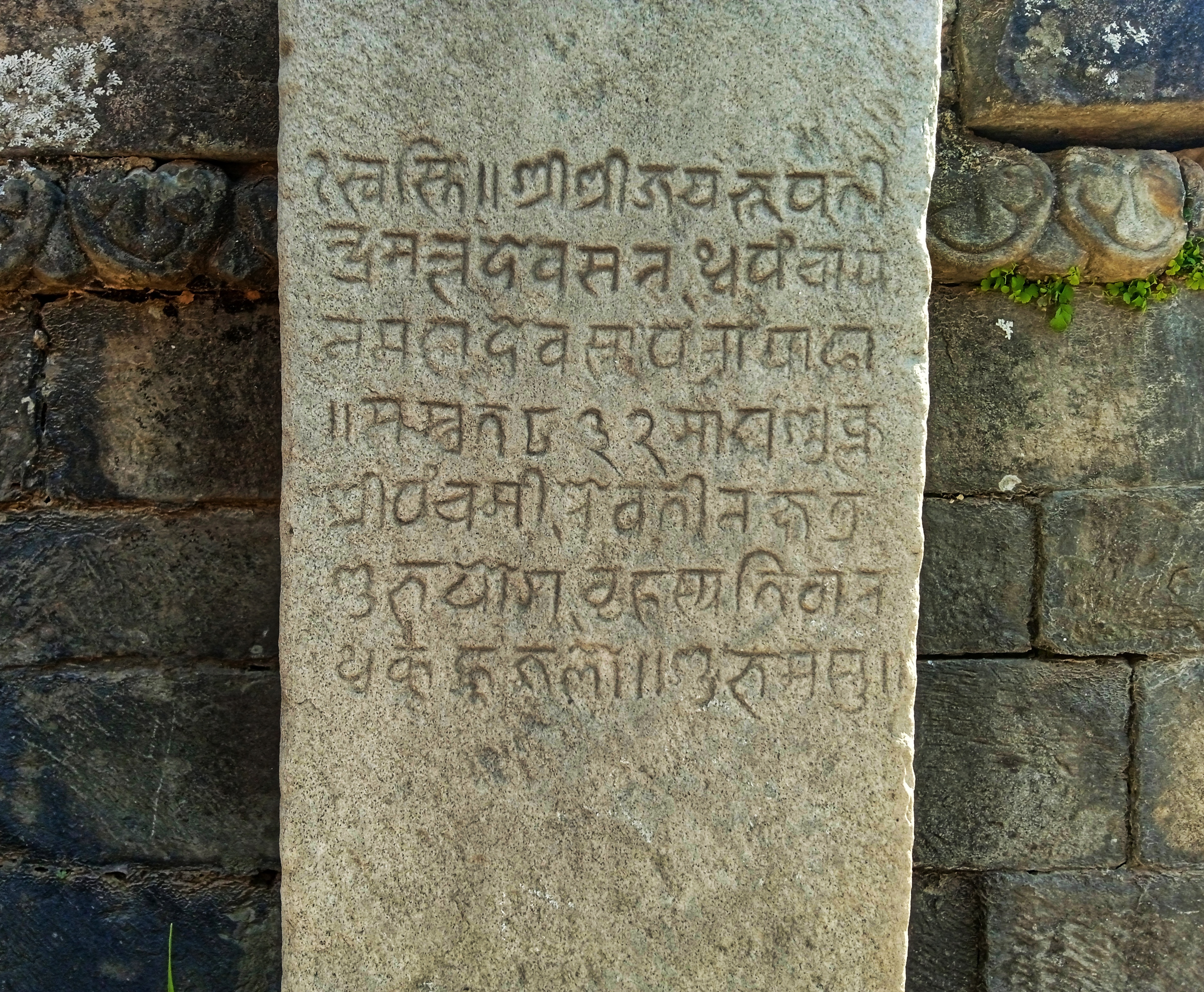
Bhupatindra Malla's Newari language inscription at the site of the Panchayāna Mahādeva.

Similarly, he also installed two large Shiva Lingams on a three-storey stone platform and decorated the platform with statues of Hindu deities. He referred to this setup as "Panchayāna Mahādeva" in an inscription. Today, most of the decorative statues have been stolen. The inscription makes it clear that the "Panchayāna Mahādeva" was established on Vasant Panchami of Nepal Sambat 832 (20 January 1713).

=== Biska Jatra ===
Bisket Jatra, known locally as Biskā Jātrā (Nepal bhasa:𑐧𑐶𑐳𑑂𑐎𑐵𑑅 𑐖𑐵𑐟𑑂𑐬𑐵) is the main festival of the people of Bhaktapur which involves the erection of a long pole and tug of war of two chariots carrying Bhairava and his consort. This annual festival which is also celebrated in smaller towns near Bhaktapur was celebrated since the time of the Licchavis and was improvised during the reign of Queen Gangā Dévi (colloquially Gangā Māhārāni) and her grandson Jagajyoti Malla.

For the construction of the Nyatapola Temple, many people's homes were demolished and lands were seized to provide space for the large temple. As a result, the Tamārhi square which houses the Nyatapola became a large area. So, in order to compensate for it, the chariot of Bhairava was enlarged significantly. Along with that, Bhupatindra Malla is also credited for making this festival more systematic and it was from his reign that this festival began to be celebrated for eight nights and nine days. Hence is festival is also referred as Chyāchā Gunhuyā Jātrā, meaning a festival with eight nights and nine days.

== Literary works ==
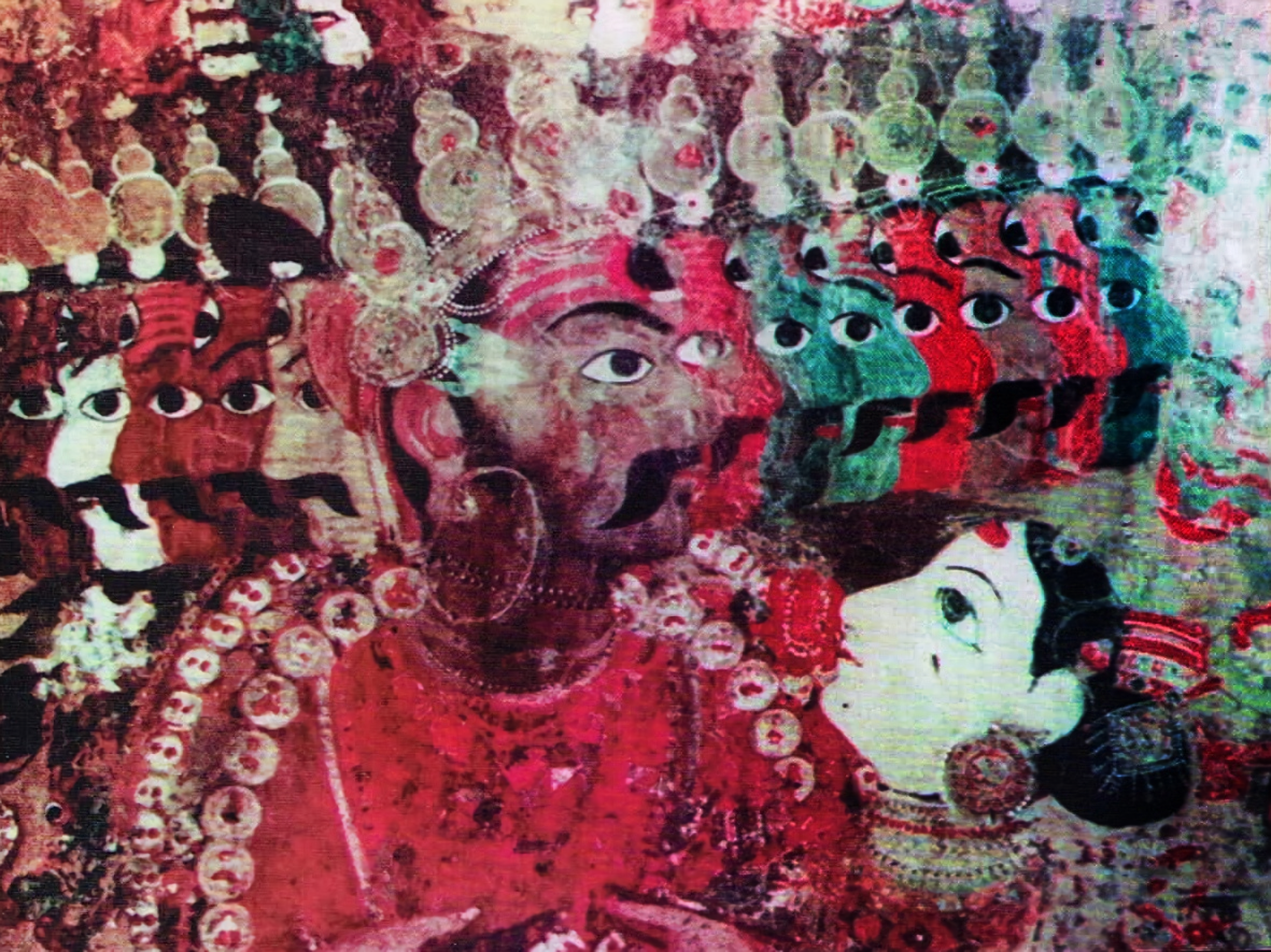
Detail of the 18th-century fresco inside the royal palace with the illustration of Bhupatindra Malla and his queen Vishva Lakshmi (Note: Note the mole on her chin.) in the form of Shakti–Shiva Vishvarupa (the universal form of Shiva and his consort).

Like most Malla Kings, Bhupatindra Malla was keen in literature as well. The Mallas mostly wrote in Nepal Bhasa and Maithili mixed with Sanskrit. Bhupatindrara Malla was a great contributor of Maithili lyrics and Nepal Bhasa plays.

In total, he is known to have composed 31 plays, 26 of which were composed in the Maithili language.

== Physical appearance ==
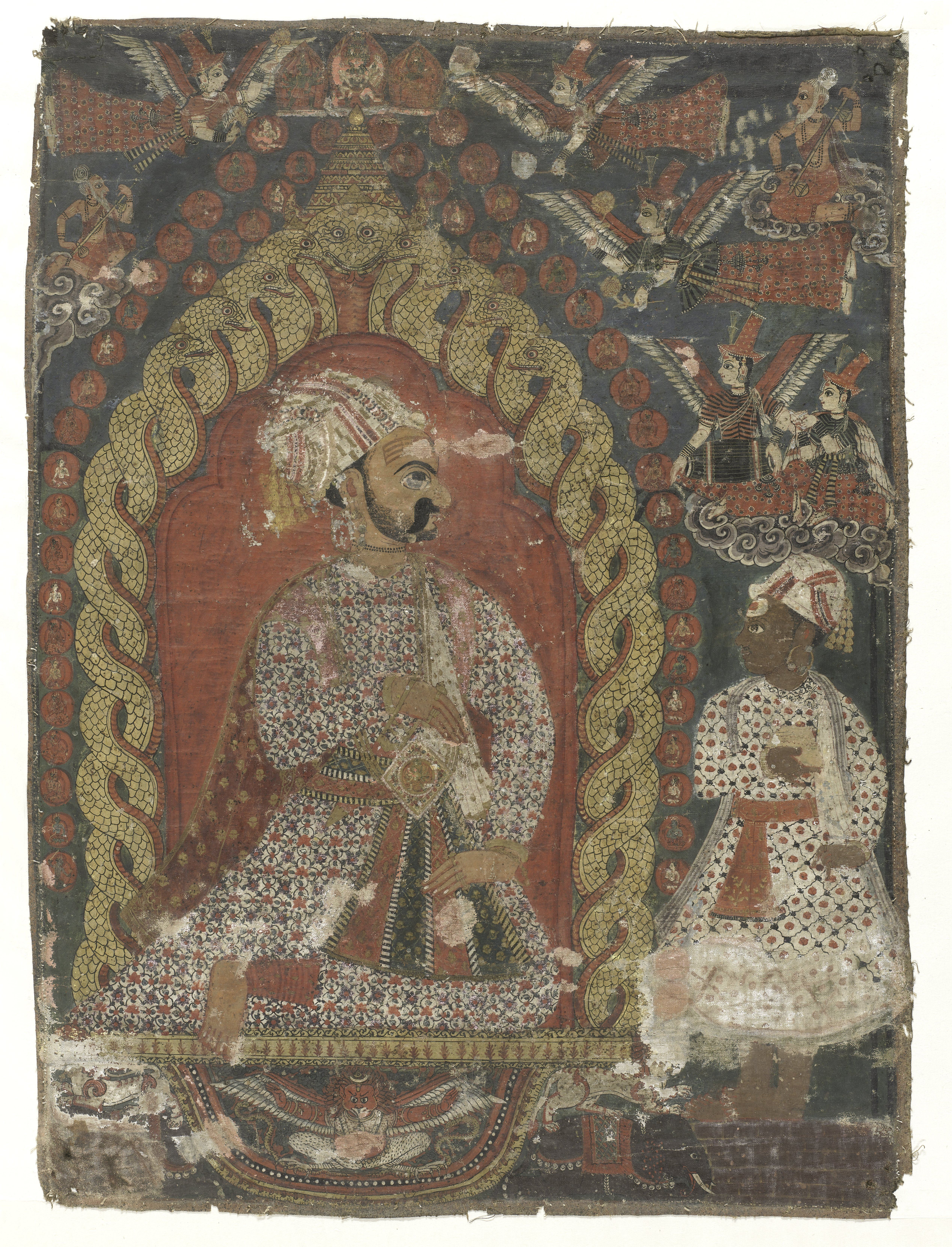
Canvas painting by an anonymous artist at the Rijksmuseum, c. 1700—1725. It depicts Bhupatindra Malla on his serpent throne. (Note: Malla kings regarded themselves to be the descendants of Vishnu. Hence, their throne had a snake canopy representing the Shesha and a Garuda bird on the bottom.) The throne is surrounded by miniatures of female divinities while the king is being attended by his minister Hāku Bhāju and heavenly beings like apsara and gandharva.

Bhupatindra Malla is among the most painted of the Malla kings along with Pratap Malla and Siddhi Narasimha Malla. His most detailed portrait is a Paubha presently at the Rijksmuseum. The walls on the second floor of the palace of fifty-five windows also have numerous depictions of Bhupatindra Malla including a hunting scene and a portrait of himself and his queen as Vishvarupa. Vaidya has also reported numerous wall paintings of Bhupatindra Malla inside the restricted buildings of the Taleju temple complex. Similarly, Madanjeet Singh has also published paintings of Bhupatindra Malla from the Bhairava Chōka courtyard inside Bhaktapur Durbar Square. The Delhi museum also hosts some scroll paintings of Bhupatindra Malla. Similarly, two Nepalese Paubha contain a miniature of Bhupatindra Malla: one dated 1681 with Bhupatindra as prince, seated with his father and his uncle and the other dated 1716 where Bhupatindra Malla is seated with his crown prince.

Bhupatindra Malla's most iconic image is the gold-plated bronze statue at the royal palace complex. The larger-than-life-size statue was made by an artisan from Kantipur and depicts him in the act of worship and as a devotee of Goddess Taleju with his hands folded in Añjali Mudrā. The statue sits above a stone pillar in front of the Nepāladhvākhā (lit. 'gateway of Nepal', known as the golden gate among tourists), a golden gateway that forms as the main entry gate to the inner courtyards to the palace. Bhupatindra Malla is seated on a lion seat which itself rests atop a lotus throne. Right below the lotus throne, a gilt bronze snake wraps the stone pillar while a bird rests on the snake's head. It is believed that Bhaktapur will be destroyed if the bird flies from the snake head and through the palms of the king. Similarly, Bhupatindra Malla is wearing two rings with a blue coloured gem on his two index fingers. The parasol above Bhupatindra Malla is missing its leaf like structure made up of gilt bronze that blew with the wind. Similarly, the legs have two bullet holes from the Battle of Bhaktapur. Many have tried to steal this statue with the most recent one in 1983 when thieves tried to use an excavator and a crane to steal the statue in broad daylight; they were stopped by angry locals and the local police.

A life-size bronze image of him, his queen and his heir is available at the National Museum of Nepal. The Art Gallery of New South Wales hosts gilt copper statues of him and his queen. There are also numerous stone statues of him inside the palace complex. There are also a few gold-plated sculptures of him in the form a ritual oil lamp, still used by various traditional singing groups of Bhaktapur.

Starting from Jayasthiti Malla in the 14th century, the kings from the Malla dynasty considered themselves to be an incarnation of Vishnu. Hence, the throne of the Malla kings, including the one Bhupatindra Malla is depicted in, had a snake canopy representing the Shesha of Vishnu and a Garuda on the bottom part of the throne representing his Vahana. The legs of the throne were modified into a lion riding an elephant. Since, Bhupatindra Malla was a great devotee of Shiva, he is depicted with a Tripundra, the Tilaka of Shiva on his forehead. Vaidya described Bhupatindra Malla from one of his paintings in the building of the courtyard of Taleju as "a smart looking man with a pretty nose and moustache". Likewise, like most Malla kings, Bhupatindra in his paintings mostly wore a jāmā (garment) and a pagari (turban) and is adorned with various Newari jewelleries.

== Children ==
There are two children from Bhupatindra Malla that appears in written records. His heir Ranajita Malla was born on 18 November 1702. Similarly, he also had a daughter named Kirti Lakshmi whose name appears in a contemporary expenditure book.

== Cultural significance ==
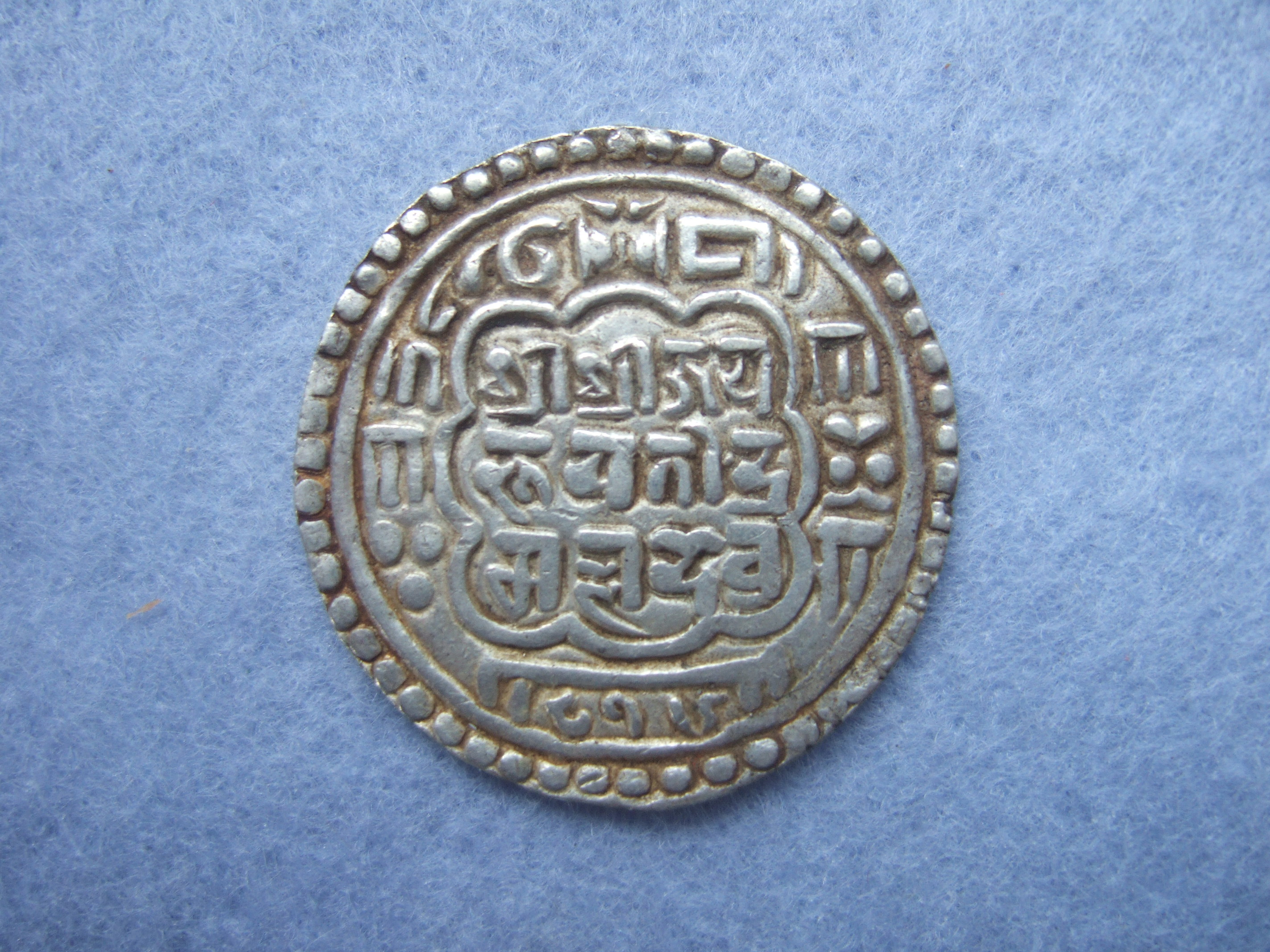
Nepalese Silver Mohar in the name of Bhupatindra Malla of Bhadgaon, dated Nepal Era 816 ( = 1696)

Bhupatindra Malla is an important part of the local folklore. Bhupatindra Malla's life, particularly his childhood, has been an integral part of the local folklore. Bhupatindra's stepmother takes the role of antagonist in these stories as she is believed to have repeatedly plotted to assassinate the young prince. In particular, two stories come up, the first in which the stepmother convinces Bhupatindra to swim in a remote part of the Hanumanté river with her son with the intention to kill Bhupatindra with a blade she planted on the river bottom. However, it is Bhupatindra's stepbrother who is killed by the blade, due to divine interference, it is locally believed. A Shiva Lingam was established at the site where it occurred and the area itself is today called Chupingālé (lit. 'knifed ditch'). Similarly, in the other story, a young Bhupatindra Malla is sent to the forests by his stepmother in order to be killed, but is spared by the assassins who run their knives on a goat instead. Later, Bhupatindra is raised by a family of Tibetans and a grown up Bhupatindra takes back the throne and exiles the usurping stepmother.

Bhupatindra Malla is also the subject of a Newari folk song. The song talks about the construction of the Nyatapola temple. Following are the lyrics of the song:

Nepal Bhasa

𑐖𑐫 𑐨𑐹𑐥𑐟𑐷𑐣𑑂𑐡𑑂𑐬 𑐩𑐮𑑂𑐮 𑐢𑐬𑐩𑐩𑐹𑐬𑐟𑐷 𑑋𑑋𑐢𑑂𑐬𑐸𑑋𑑋
𑐰𑐳𑐣 𑐡𑐾𑐐𑑀𑐮 𑐡𑐵𑐒 𑐡𑐾𑐰𑐷 𑐥𑑂𑐬𑐷𑐟𑐶𑐣 𑑋𑑋
𑐣𑐳𑐾 𑐔𑑂𑐫𑐵𑐫𑐵 𑐡𑐠𑐸𑐳𑑄 𑐣𑐳𑐾 𑐟𑐵𑐒𑐵𑐰 𑑋𑑋
𑐡𑐶𑐟𑐬𑐵 𑐠𑑀𑐎𑐫𑐵 𑐥𑐵𑐡𑐸 𑐖𑐸𑐫𑐵 𑐡𑐶𑐣 𑐖𑐵𑐰, 𑐢𑐬𑐩𑐩𑐹𑐬𑐟𑐷 𑑋𑑋
𑐎𑑂𑐰𑐠𑐸 𑐦𑐮𑐾 𑐖𑐫𑐥𑑂𑐬𑐟𑐵𑐥 𑐰𑐫𑐵 𑐔𑑀𑐳𑑄 𑐎𑐶𑐳𑐶 𑑋𑑋
𑐳𑐶𑑄𑐴 𑐱𑐵𑐬𑑂𑐡𑐹𑐮 𑐀𑐣𑐵 𑐀𑐟𑐶𑐱𑑀𑐨𑐵 𑐖𑐸𑐮, 𑐢𑐬𑐩𑐩𑐹𑐬𑐟𑐷 𑑋𑑋
𑐡𑐾𑐐𑐮𑐫𑐵 𑐥𑐾𑑄𑐐𑐸 𑐎𑐸𑐣𑐾 𑐡𑐶𑐐𑑄 𑐐𑐞𑐾𑐱 𑐟𑐮 𑑋𑑋
𑐟𑐵𑐎𑑄 𑐟𑐵𑐎 𑐦𑐮𑐾 𑐀𑐣𑐵 𑐀𑐟𑐶 𑐱𑑀𑐨𑐵 𑐖𑐸𑐮, 𑐢𑐬𑐩𑐩𑐹𑐬𑐟𑐷 𑑋𑑋
𑐒𑐵𑐟𑐥𑑀𑐮𑐫𑐵 𑐔𑑀𑐳𑑄 𑐕𑐵𑐮 𑐮𑐸𑑃 𑐐𑐖𑐸𑐮 𑑋𑑋
𑐰𑐳𑐣 𑐖𑐖𑑂𑐘 𑐫𑐵𑐟 𑐎𑑀𑐚𑐷 𑐁𑐴𑐸𑐟𑐶 𑑋𑑋
𑐧𑐶𑐮 𑐥𑐸𑐬𑑀𑐴𑐶𑐟𑐫𑐵𑐟 𑐩𑐹𑐮 𑐮𑐸𑑃 𑐩𑐸𑐎𑐸𑐟𑐶 𑑋𑑋

Translation

Hail Bhupatindra Malla who is the epitome of Dharma
Thou has built a temple for Devi
On the year 822 (of Nepal Sambat)
Completed on the fifth day of the bright half of the month of Ashada
On the bottom plinth of the temple stands Jay and Pratap and above them are elephants
Lions and Griffins increase (their) elegancy
Four guardian Ganeshas at each corner (of the temple)
The plinths have made the temple elegant
A golden pinnacle was installed in the Nyatapola (by thee)
Thou did a Kotyāhuti Yagya after its completion
And gifted a golden crown to the priests.

Some also believe Bhupatindra Malla to be an incarnation of a Bodhisattva.

Nepalese playwright Bhim Nidhi Tiwari wrote a play, "Mahārāja Bhūpatīndra", detailing the life of Bhupatindra Malla. Along with portyaing his life, Tiwari also aimed to clear some misconceptions regarding his life, such as the death of Jitamitra Malla, which many historians wrongly wrote as the same year in which Bhupatindra was crowned. Similarly, Bhupatindra Malla plays a central role in the first half of the historical fiction novel Ranahar, written by Yogesh Raj, which also won the Madan Puraskar in 2018.

== See also ==
- Nyatapola
