= Henry Ambrose Oldfield =

British painter

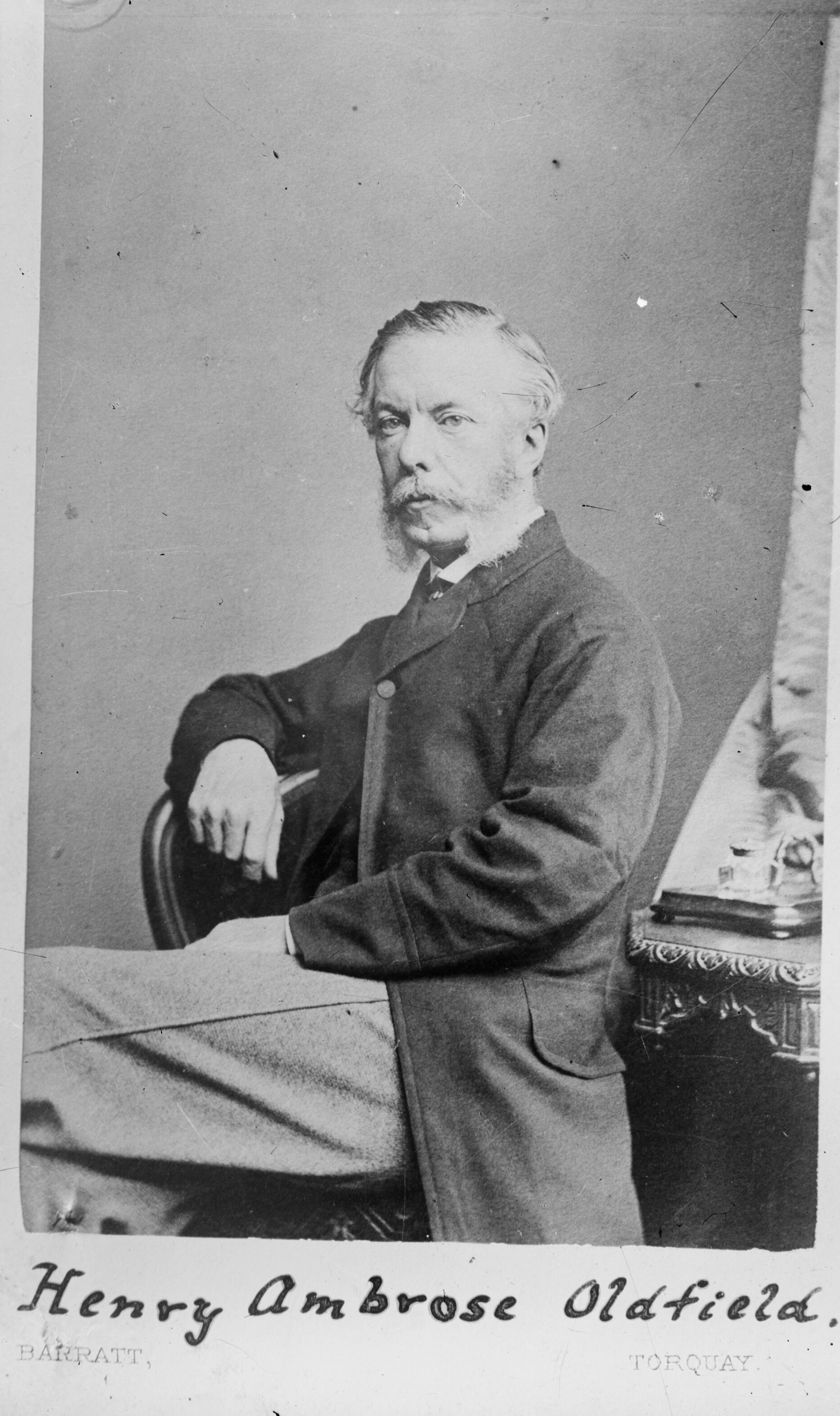
- Henry Ambrose Oldfield (1822–1871)
- Born: 1822; United Kingdom
- Died: 1871 (aged 48–49); Kathmandu, Nepal
- Notable work: Sketches from Nepal, Historical and Descriptive, with works of the Court Life and Wild Sports of the Country in the Time of Maharaja Jang Bahadur
- Spouse: Margaret Alicia

Henry Ambrose Oldfield (1822–1871) was a British painter. He also was a doctor in at the British Residency in Kathmandu, Nepal from 1850 to 1863. He also had great relations with Jung Bahadur Rana, former prime minister of Nepal.

== Works ==
- Sketches from Nipal, Historical and Descriptive, with Anecdotes of the Court Life and Wild Sports of the Country in the Time of Maharaja Jang Bahadur, G. C. B.; Volume 1. Creative Media Partners, LLC. 13 October 2018. ISBN 978-0-342-70979-3.
