= Bhim Nidhi Tiwari =

Nepali writer (1911–1973)

Bhim Nidhi Tiwari भीमनिधि तिवारी
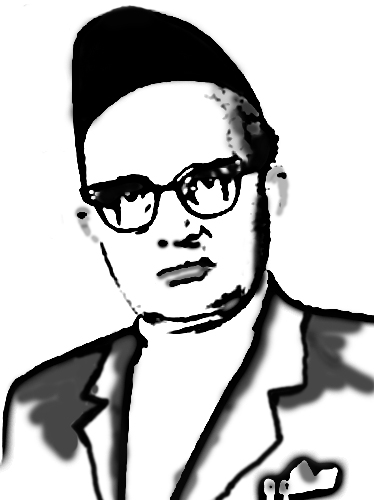
- Born: 1911; Tiwari Tole, Dillibazar, Kathmandu, Nepal
- Died: 1973 (aged 61–62)
- Occupations: Poet, novelist, playwright
- Spouse: Bhuwaneshwori Tiwari
- Children: Benju Sharma, Manju Kanchuli Tiwari, Niranjan Tiwari, Nikunja Tiwari
- Parents: Lal Nidhi Tiwari (father); Nanda Kumari Tiwari (mother)

Not be confused with the Nepalese Communist leader of the 1980s, Bhim Nidhi Tiwari.

Bhim Nidhi Tiwari(Nepali: भीमनिधि तिवारी) (1911–1973) was a leading Nepali poet, novelist and playwright. He was a well-known poet of the post-1950s era and was a firm believer in social reforms and wrote against smoking, drinking, and gambling. He published over 38 works in various styles.

== Life ==
He was born in Dillibazar, Kathmandu, Nepal to Lal Nidhi Tiwari and Nanda Kumari Tiwari in 1911. He served as a government employee for 32 years. He was a section officer in the Ministry of Education and afterwards served an Assistant Secretary. He established the "Nepal Sahitya Press" which later merged with "Pashupati Press". He also established the Nepal Natak Sangh (an organisation that works to promote Nepalese literature and drama).

In 1966, he represented Nepal as Ministry of Education in the East Asia UNESCO seminar, which focused on copyright issues. He also accompanied his Late Majesty King Mahendra Bir Bikram Shah on a Royal visit to the Netherlands, West Germany, and Karachi.

In 1959, he chronicled in a film with his namesake. In the late 1960s, he was a member the Regmi Research Project's Board of Directors.

== Works ==
Tiwari wrote short stories, novels, poems, lyrics, and satires which provide insight into Nepalese lifestyles, culture, mythologies, and history. He was also the recipient of many awards and prizes. He received the Madan Puraskar in 1960 as well as the "Prakhyan Trishakti Patta", "Rajyabisekh Padak", and "Gyanpad Sewa". The historical dramas "Silanyas", "Matokomaya" and "Yasashvisav" also received awards.

In one of his best-known poems titled "Dagbatti", he tells about his experience as a child of seven years when his mother died and in the night he was taken to the ghats burning grounds (cremation fields), his head was shaved and what feelings engulfed him when fire consumed his mother's body. Other works included Samajik kahani, Bisphot (also spelled Visphot and it was about "social injustice and social disintegration"), Putali, Tarpan, Adarsha Jeevan, Bibaha, Barshiksa, Sahanshila Shushila, Yashawi Shava, and Yashash.

He and his works were also chronicled in the 2013 book Selected poems of Bhim Nidhi Tiwari by Rabhindra Nath Rimal that was published by Nepal Academy.
