= Sirutar =

Town in Bhaktapur

Sirutar सिरुटार
- Suraybinayak municipality
- Location in Nepal Sirutar (Nepal)
- Coordinates: 27.65°N 85.38°E
- Country: Nepal
- District: Bhaktapur District
- Municipality: Suryabinayak Municipality
- Elevation: 1,300 m (4,300 ft)

Population (2021)
  - Total: 10,629
  - Ethnicities: Newars Brahmin Chhetri Rai Magar
  - Religions: Hinduism Buddhism Islam Christianity
- Time zone: UTC+5:45 (Nepal Time)

Sirutar (Nepali: सिरुटार) is a town located in Bhaktapur District . It comes under Suryabinayak Municipality.

Sirutar is a town and is situated in ward 1 of Suryabinayak Municipality in Bhaktapur District in Province no 3 of central Nepal. At the time of the 2021 Nepal census it had a population of 10,629 in it.

Sirutar extends from East to west in the Southern territory of Bhaktapur district. This town resembles "P" shape of the English alphabet. It is almost 4 km from Bhaktapur nagar and is 9 km from the Kathmandu city. Sirutar is situated about 1,300 meters above the sea level. This town lies in between Bhaktapur and Lalitpur district. Dadhikot lies in the east of this, Balkot and Tikathali in the west, Dadhikot and Balkot in the North, and Lamatar, Lubhu and Tikathali in the South.

The name "Sirutar" came from two names in Nepali – "Siru" meaning a kind of plants with hard stem that grow in dry lands and "tar" meaning a dry land that is suitable for the growth of plants like Siru. That being said, Sirutar is a dry, barren land that does not have proper irrigation and is covered by Siru. An anecdote supports this naming: long time back, this place had thick human settlement compared with the neighboring villages; the lands were also fertile that gave good amount of crops. There was a king's palace with a beautiful garden protected with compounded walls. This place was thus also called Swaga in Newari language, meaning a garden. A group of Newars worked in the palace. Later, the people from this place started migrating for some sudden reasons and the fertility of the lands also diminished. Sati out of anger cursed this place to only let Siru grow. Hence, Siru started to grow here. However, no inscriptions and scriptures are found to prove this anecdote.

In winter, the temperature reaches up to 2-10°C and in summer, it reaches up to 21-32°C.

Majority of the population in this town are Hindu; there are temples of Mahadev, Bhairav, Ganesh, Saraswati, Balkumari, and Devi.

== Demographics ==
Historical population
Census year	Pop.	±% p.a.
1975	247	—
1991	2,402	+15.28%
2001	3,327	+3.31%
2011	4,598	+3.29%
2021	10,629	+8.74%
Source: Cityfacts

=== Male and female rato ===
Male and Female ratio in Sirutar (2011)
1. Male (48.2%)
2. Female (51.8%)

At the time of the 2011 Census of Nepal, 48.2% of the population in Sirutar were Male and 51.8% were female.
