= Chitpol =

Chittpol चित्तपोल
- Former Village Development Committee
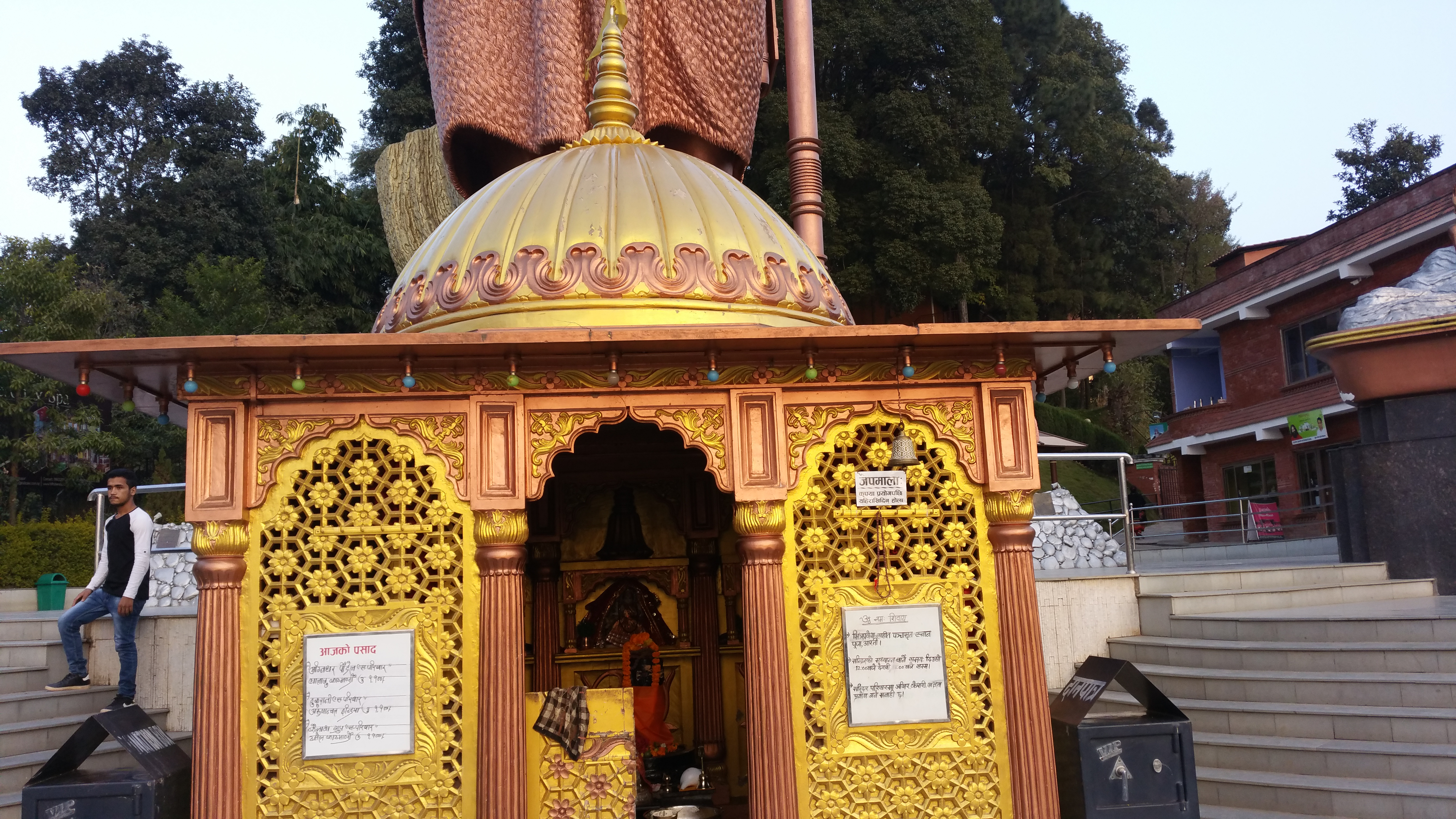
- Kailashnath Mahadev Statue at Sanga
- Interactive map of Chittpol
- Country: Nepal
- Province: Bagmati Province
- District: Bhaktapur District
- Municipality: Suryabinayak Municipality

Population (1991)
  - Total: 4,689
  - Religions: Hindu
- Time zone: UTC+5:45 (Nepal Time)

Chittpol (Nepali: चित्तपोल), also spelled Chitapol (चितापोल), is a settlement in Suryabinayak Municipality of Bhaktapur District, Bagmati Province, Nepal. It is situated in the Sanga area along the Araniko Highway, on the eastern side of the Kathmandu Valley.

Chittpol was formerly a Village Development Committee in the former Bagmati Zone. In 2014, the Government of Nepal incorporated Chittpol into the newly established Suryabinayak Municipality as part of the restructuring of local government in the Kathmandu and Bhaktapur areas.

At the time of the 1991 Nepal census, the former Chittpol VDC had a population of 4,689 living in 819 households.

== Geography ==
Chittpol lies in the hilly southern part of Bhaktapur District, in the Sanga area between the Kathmandu Valley and the route toward Dhulikhel. The settlement is characterized by forested hills, agricultural land, residential areas and expanding tourism and hospitality facilities.

The Sanga area is located at an important transportation point on the Araniko Highway, which connects Kathmandu with Bhaktapur, Dhulikhel and the Tibet border region.

The area surrounding Chittpol provides elevated views toward parts of the Kathmandu Valley and the surrounding hills. Its combination of religious sites, hill landscapes and hospitality facilities has contributed to the growth of tourism in the locality.

== Landmarks and attractions ==
=== Kailashnath Mahadev Statue ===
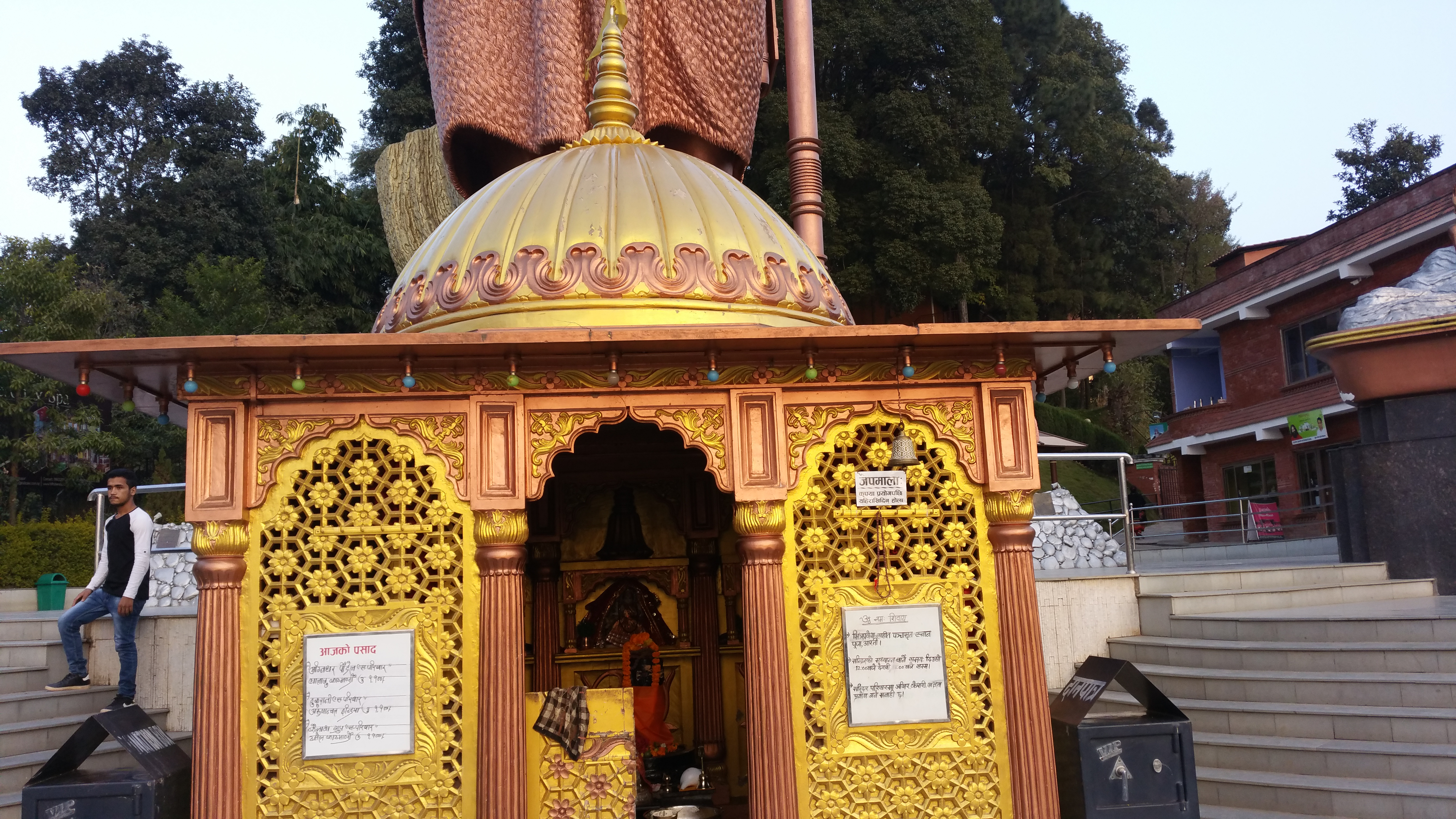
The Kailashnath Mahadev Statue at Sanga

The Kailashnath Mahadev Statue is the best-known landmark in the Sanga area of Chittpol. The monumental statue represents Shiva and is approximately 143 feet (43.5 metres) high. It was constructed using steel, concrete, zinc and copper.

Construction began in the early 2000s and the statue was completed around 2010. It was formally opened in June 2011 during the Teej festival, according to information published by the Hilltake Group.

The statue stands on a hilltop complex and is surrounded by landscaped grounds and religious structures. It has become an important destination for Hindu pilgrims as well as domestic and international tourists visiting the Kathmandu Valley. The site is also commonly known as Sanga Mahadev.

The statue's location on the ridge above Sanga gives visitors views of the surrounding hills and countryside. The monument is approximately 20 km from Kathmandu and is readily accessible by road through Bhaktapur and Sanga.

=== Fortune Resort & Wellness Spa Bhaktapur ===
Fortune Resort & Wellness Spa Bhaktapur is a hotel and wellness resort located in the Sanga area of Chittpol. The property is part of the Fortune Hotels brand and a member of the ITC Hotels group. Its official address is Bhaktapur, Sanga 44800.

The resort is set among the hills of Sanga and markets itself as a retreat from the urban environment of Kathmandu. It provides accommodation, dining, wellness and event facilities. The property has 66 rooms and suites and includes a multicuisine restaurants, spa facilities, an outdoor swimming pool and spaces for wedding, meetings and celebrations.

The resort's location is particularly notable because it is close to the Kailashnath Mahadev Statue. The combination of accommodation, wellness facilities, scenic hill surroundings and proximity to the religious landmark has made the Sanga area a destination for visitors seeking both recreation and religious tourism.

The resort also provides an event venue, including an open deck area of more than 1,000 square metres adjacent to its swimming pool. According to the hotel, the venue can accommodate large gatherings of up to approximately 600 guests.

=== Sanga area ===
The Sanga area surrounding Chittpol is a growing religious and tourism destination. In addition to the Kailashnath Mahadev Statue, the area contains smaller religious sites, viewpoints, restaurants, hotels and recreation facilities.

Sanga's position along the Araniko Highway makes it a common stopping point for travelers traveling between Kathmandu, Bhaktapur and the eastern hill districts.

== Religion and culture ==
Chittpol and the surrounding Sanga area have a predominantly Hindu cultural character. The Kailashnath Mahadev complex is particularly associated with the worship of Shiva and attracts visitors during major Hindu religious occasions, including Shivaratri and Teej.

Religious tourism has become an important part of the identity of the Sanga area, alongside its traditional agricultural and residential character.

== Tourism ==
Tourism in Chittpol is closely associated with the landscape of Sanga and the Kailashnath Mahadev Statue. The area can be visited as part of excursions from Kathmandu and Bhaktapur.

The presence of hotels and resorts, including Fortune Resort & Wellness Spa, has expanded the area's capacity for overnight visitors. Visitors can combine religious sightseeing at Kailashnath Mahadev with accommodation, dining and wellness activities in the surrounding hills.

The nearby Bhaktapur Durbar Square, a UNESCO World Heritage Site, is also accessible by road from Chittpol, making the area part of a wider tourism circuit in the Kathmandu Valley.

== Transportation ==
Chittpol is connected to the surrounding settlements by road. The principal transportation route is the Araniko Highway, which passes through the Sanga area.

The settlement is accessible from Kathmandu through Bhaktapur and Sanga. Road transport includes private vehicles, taxis and public buses operating along the Kathmandu–Bhaktapur–Dhulikhel corridor.

== Administrative history ==
Chittpol was previously administered as a Village Development Committee of Bhaktapur District in the former Bagmati Zone. Following the restructuring of Nepal's local government system, the VDC was incorporated into Suryabinayak Municipality in 2014.

The former VDC structure was subsequently replaced by the municipal administrative system.

== See also ==
Suryabinayak Municipality Bhaktapur District Kailashnath Mahadev Statue Bhaktapur Durbar Square Araniko Highway Kathmandu Valley Dhulikhel
