= Kautunje =

Katunje कटुन्जे
- small town of Suryabinayak Municipality
- Location in Nepal
- Coordinates: 27.66°N 85.41°E
- Country: Nepal
- Province: Bagmati Province
- District: Bhaktapur

Population (2011)
  - Total: 19,497
  - Religions: Hindu
- Time zone: UTC+5:45 (Nepal Time)

Katunje (Nepali: कटुन्जे) is a small town located in the Bhaktapur district of Bagmati Province. It is part of the historically rich Kathmandu Valley, known for its cultural heritage and traditional Newari settlements. Katunje has seen rapid urbanization while still maintaining some of its traditional charm.

Geography and Location

Katunje is situated approximately 16 kilometers east of Kathmandu, the capital city of Nepal. It lies at an elevation of around 1,339 meters (4,393 feet) above sea level. The town is part of the Kathmandu Valley's inner belt, bordered by urban and semi-rural areas. Its proximity to Bhaktapur Durbar Square, a UNESCO World Heritage Site, makes it a notable settlement in the region.

Population and Demographics

Katunje is predominantly inhabited by the Newar community, known for their unique culture, festivals, and traditional architecture. Other ethnic groups, such as Brahmins, Chhetris, and Tamangs, also reside here. The population has grown significantly in recent decades due to urban expansion.

At the time of the 2011 Nepal census it had a population of 19,497 with 4,692 houses in it.

Notable Landmarks

Proximity to Bhaktapur Durbar Square, a UNESCO World Heritage Site, adds cultural and historical significance.

3 major temples, Mahadevsthan Temple, Ganesh Temple, and Sushila Bhairab Temple within Katunje often serve as focal points for festivals and gatherings.
