= Gundu, Nepal =

Gundu गुन्डा टोल गुण्डु टोल
- Ward No. 7 of Suryabinayak Municipality
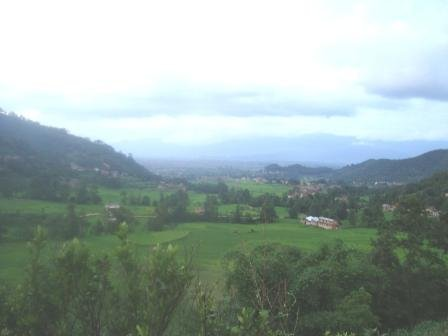

- Location in Nepal
- Coordinates: 27.39°N 85.25°E
- Country: Nepal
- Zone: Bagmati Zone
- District: Bhaktapur District
- Municipality: Suryabinayak Municipality

Population (2011)
  - Total: 5,689
  - Religions: Hindu
- Time zone: UTC+5:45 (Nepal Time)

Gundu is a former Village Development Committee located in Suryabinayak Municipality, Ward No. 7, of Bhaktapur District in central Nepal. Situated on the eastern fringe of the Kathmandu Valley, Gundu is known for its calm residential environment, open landscapes, and panoramic views of the surrounding hills and valley. The area is characterized by low-density housing, greenery, and comparatively clean surroundings, making it distinct from the more congested urban centers of the valley. Due to its peaceful atmosphere, scenic setting, and proximity to major urban hubs, Gundu has gradually developed into a preferred residential locality while retaining its semi-rural charm. Gundu lies within the historic Bagmati Zone and forms part of the rapidly expanding suburban region of Suryabinayak Municipality

== Governance ==
The Ward Chairperson of Gundu is Rabindra Sapkota. Rabindra Sapkota won 2019 election again after his victory in 2014. He represents CPN (UML).

== Demographics ==
At the 1991 Nepal census, it had a population of 5,689, with 1,257 households.
