= Chapacho =

Chapacho चपाचो
- Village Development Committee
- Country: Nepal
- Zone: Bagmati Zone
- District: Bhaktapur District

Population (1991)
  - Total: 7,734
  - Religions: Hindu
- Time zone: UTC+5:45 (Nepal Time)

Chapacho (Nepali: चपाचो) is a town in Madhyapur Thimi of Bhaktapur District in the Bagmati Zone of central Nepal. At the time of the 1991 Nepal census it had a population of 7,734 with 1,186 houses in it.
