= Sudal =

Sudal सुडाल
- Village Development Committee
- Location in Nepal
- Coordinates: 27.68°N 85.48°E
- Country: Nepal
- Zone: Bagmati Zone
- District: Bhaktapur District

Population (1991)
  - Total: 6,074
  - Religions: Hindu
- Time zone: UTC+5:45 (Nepal Time)

Sudal (Nepali: सुडाल) is a village and Village Development Committee in Bhaktapur District in the Bagmati Zone of central Nepal. At the 1991 Nepal census, it had a population of 6,074 in 1,081 houses.
