= Nankhel =

Nankhel नङखेल
- Village Development Committee
- Location in Nepal
- Coordinates: 27.64°N 85.46°E
- Country: Nepal
- Zone: Bagmati Zone
- District: Bhaktapur District

Population (1991)
  - Total: 4,520
  - Religions: Hindu
- Time zone: UTC+5:45 (Nepal Time)

Nankhel (Nepali: नङखेल) is a village and former Village Development Committee in Bhaktapur District in the Bagmati Zone of central Nepal. In 2014, it was merged into the newly formed Suryabinayak Municipality by the Government of Nepal in order to remove all Village Development Committees in the Districts of Kathmandu and Bhaktapur. At the time of the 1991 Nepal census it had a population of 4,520 with 767 houses in it.
