= Suryabinayak Municipality =

Suryabinayak सूर्यविनायक
- Municipality (नगरपालिका)
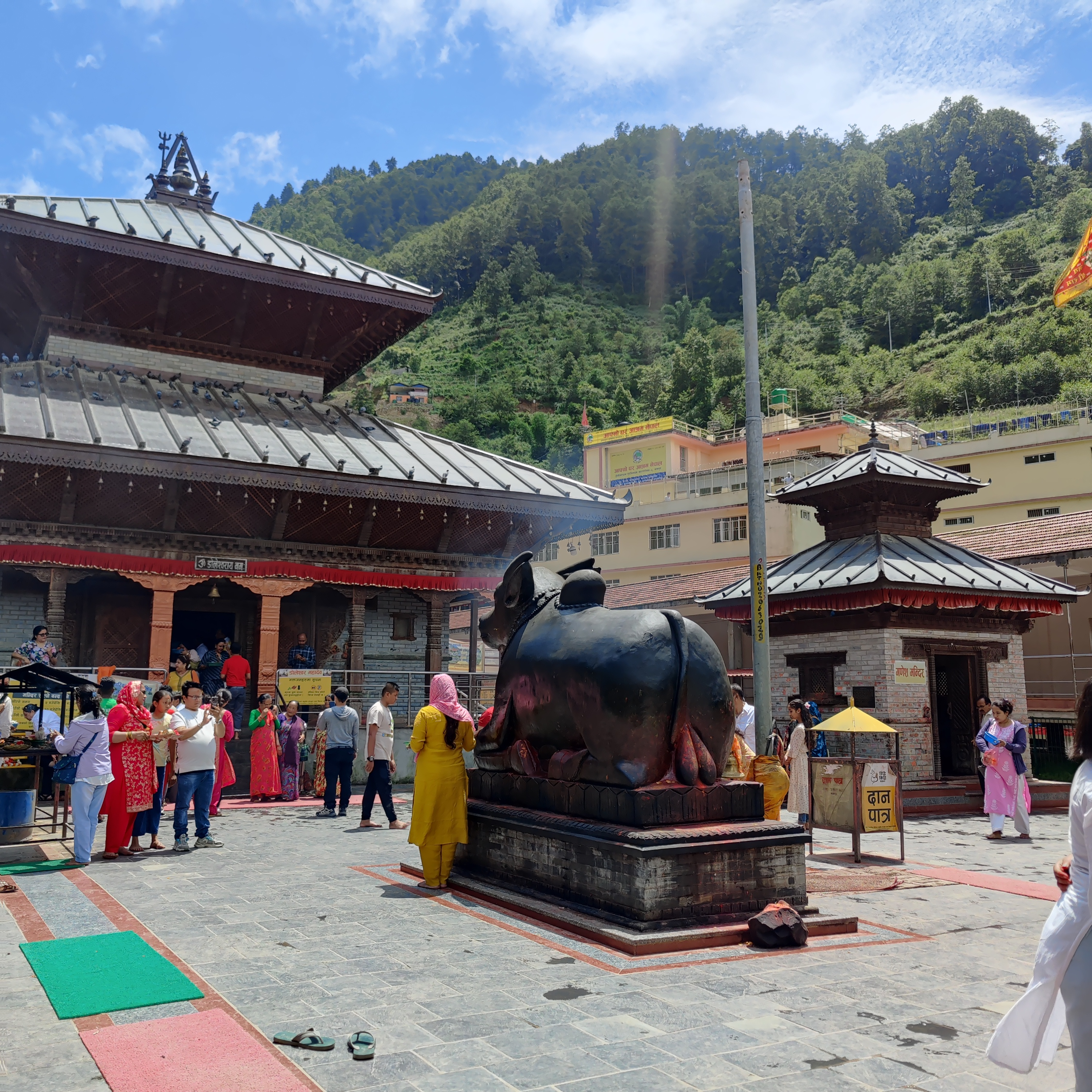
- Doleshwar Mandir

- Location in Nepal Suryabinayak (Nepal)
- Coordinates: 27°40′N 85°24′E
- Country: Nepal
- Province: Bagmati
- District: Bhaktapur
- Established: December 2014
- Expanded: March 2017
- Named for: Suryavinayak Temple

Government
  - Mayor: Basudev Thapa
  - Deputy Mayor: Sarita Timisina (Bhattarai)

Area
  - Total: 42.45 km^{2} (16.39 sq mi)

Population (2021 Nepal census)
  - Total: 137,971
  - Density: 3,250/km^{2} (8,400/sq mi)
  - Ethnicities: Chhetri Bahun Newar Tamang Magar
- Website: suryabinayakmun.gov.np

Suryabinayak Municipality (Nepali: सुर्यविनायक नगरपालिका) is a municipality in Bagmati Province in central Nepal. It is located in Bhaktapur District and forms part of the urban area of the Kathmandu Valley. The municipality is known for its religious and cultural sites, including Suryavinayak Temple and Doleshwar Mahadev Temple, as well as tourism and hospitality facilities in areas such as Sanga.

The municipality was created in December 2014 through the merger of the Village development committees of Kautunje, Sipadol, Nankhel, and Chitpol. Kautunje serves as the municipal centre. In March 2017, following the restructuring of local administrative units, the municipality was expanded to include the former municipality of Anantalingeshwor and the former Village Development Committees of Sirutar, Gundu, Dadhikot, and Balkot.

The municipality's name is derived from the local Suryavinayak Temple.

== Transportation ==
Suryabinayak is connected to Kathmandu, Bhaktapur, Dhulikhel, and Panauti by road. Regular buses and other public transport services operate between Suryabinayak and surrounding urban areas. The municipality's location along major transportation routes makes it accessible from different parts of the Kathmandu Valley and nearby districts.

== Tourism ==
Tourism is an important part of the local economy of Suryabinayak Municipality. Its location within the Kathmandu Valley, proximity to Bhaktapur, and concentration of religious, cultural, and natural attractions have contributed to the development of tourism and hospitality in the area.

Important religious and cultural attractions in and around the municipality include Suryavinayak Temple, Doleshwar Mahadev Temple, and the Kailashnath Mahadev Statue in Sanga. These sites attract visitors for religious, cultural, and recreational purposes. The surrounding hills and countryside also provide opportunities for short excursions and leisure activities from Kathmandu and other parts of the valley.

The Sanga area has developed as a hospitality and tourism destination, with hotels, resorts, restaurants, and recreational facilities serving visitors to the area. Among these is Fortune Resort & Wellness Spa, Bhaktapur, a member of the ITC Hotels group, located in Sanga near the Kailashnath Mahadev Statue. The resort provides accommodation, dining, wellness and recreational facilities, as well as venues for weddings and other events.

The growth of hospitality facilities in Sanga forms part of the wider development of tourism infrastructure in Suryabinayak Municipality and the surrounding Bhaktapur area.

== Demographics ==
=== Population ===
Population of Suryabinayak
Census year	Pop.	±% p.a.
2001	55,744	—
2011	78,845	+3.53%
2021	140,085	+5.92%
Source: Central Bureau of Statistics

According to the 2021 Nepal census, the population of the areas comprising the present-day Suryabinayak Municipality was 140,085.

The municipality is inhabited by several ethnic and social groups, including Chhetri, Bahun, Newar, Tamang, and Magar communities.

=== Sex ratio ===
According to available demographic data, females slightly outnumber males in the municipality.

Sex ratio of Suryabinayak Municipality
1. Male (49.9%)
2. Female (51.1%)

=== Age distribution ===
The population includes children, working-age adults, and older residents. Available demographic data indicate that the majority of the population falls within the working-age group.

Population according to age group
1. 0–14 (21.2%)
2. 15–64 (73.1%)
3. 65+ (5.60%)

== See also ==
- Bhaktapur District
- Bagmati Province
- Kathmandu Valley
- Suryavinayak Temple
- Doleshwar Mahadev Temple
- Kailashnath Mahadev Statue
- Sanga
