= Doleshwor Mahadeva Temple =

Hindu temple in Bakhtapur, Nepal

Doleshwar Mahadev Temple
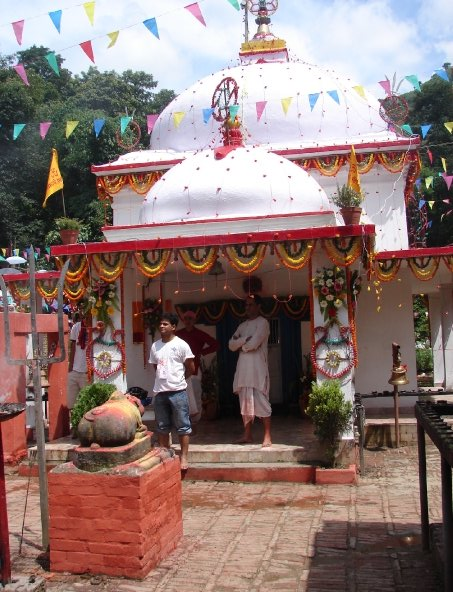

- Location in Nepal

Religion
- Affiliation: Hinduism
- District: Bhaktapur
- Deity: Shiva
- Festivals: Shivaratri, Teej, Balachaturdasi

Location
- Location: Suryabinayak
- Country: Nepal
- Interactive map of Doleshwar Mahadev Temple
- Coordinates: 27°38′20″N 85°26′17″E

Architecture
- Type: Pagoda

Doleshwor Mahadeva (Nepali: डोलेश्वर महादेव) is a temple of the Hindu god Shiva in Suryabinayak, southeastern Bhaktapur District, Nepal.
