= Balkot, Bhaktapur =

Coordinates: 27°39′49.0″N 85°22′40.3″E

Balkot बालकोट
- Town
- Interactive map of Balkot
- Country: Nepal
- District: Bhaktapur District
- Municipality: Suryabinayak Municipality

Population (2011)
  - Total: 15,881
- Time zone: UTC+5:45 (Nepal Time)

Balkot (Nepali: बालकोट) is located in Bhaktapur District in the Bagmati Province of central Nepal. In 2015, it was merged with Sirutar, Gundu and Dadhikot to form Anantalingeshowr Municipality. In March 2017, under new local level restructuring, Anantalingeswor Municipality was merged with Suryabinayak Municipality.

Currently, former prime minister of Nepal KP Sharma Oli lives in Balkot.

The 2011 Nepal census shows it had a population of 15,881 with 3,999 houses.
