= Suryavinayak Temple =

Hindu Temple in Nepal

Suryavinayak Temple सुर्यविनायक मन्दिर
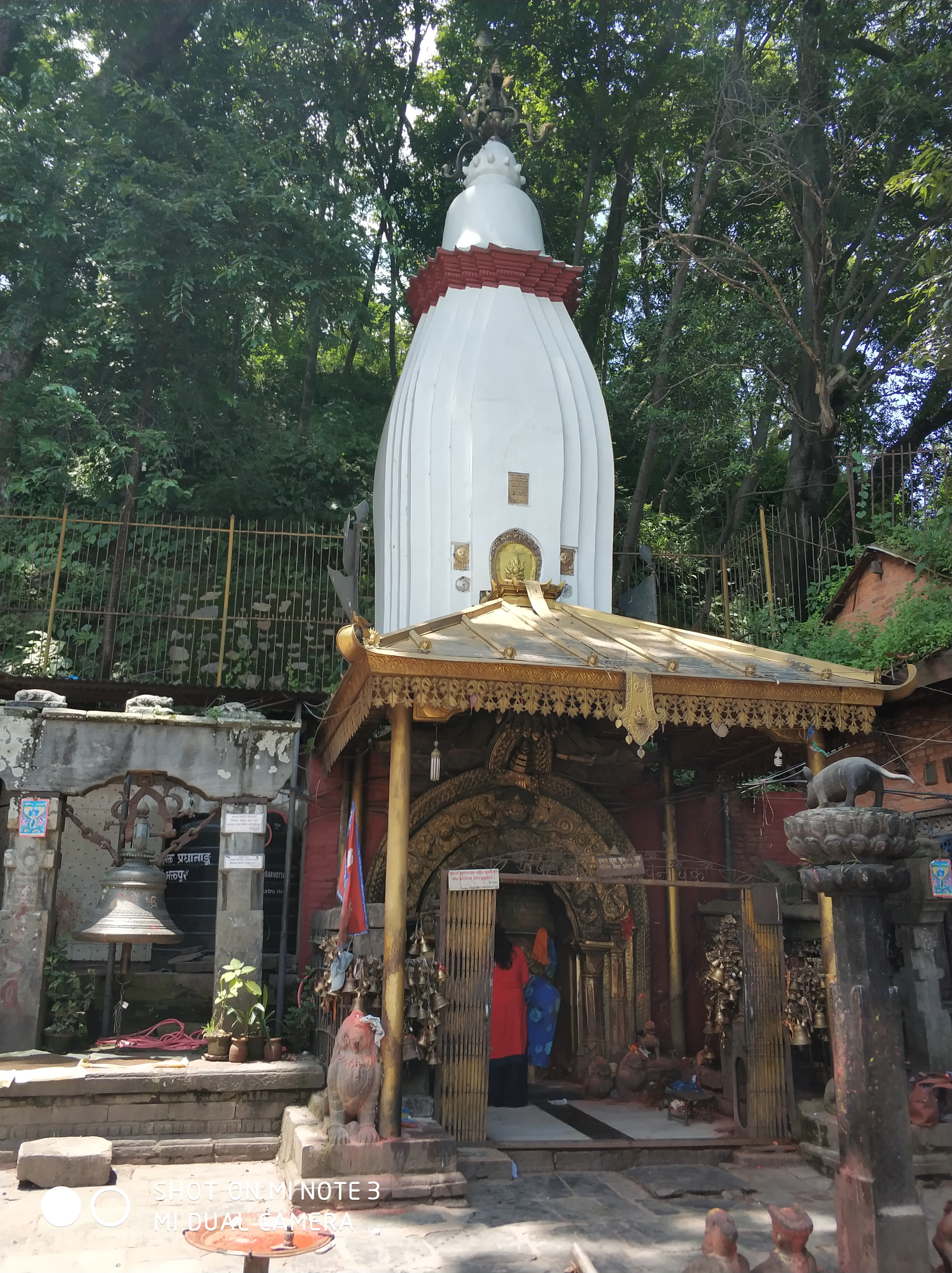
- Suryavinayak Temple

- Location in Kathmandu

Religion
- Affiliation: Hinduism

Location
- Location: Bhaktapur district
- Country: Nepal
- Coordinates: 27.6563°N 85.4234°E

Suryavinayak Temple is a Hindu temple, located in Bhaktapur district, Nepal. The temple is dedicated to the Hindu god Ganesh. The temple is an historical and cultural monument and tourist centre. The Suryavinayak Temple is one of the four popular shrines of Lord Ganesh in the Kathmandu Valley. The temple is also known as the temple of the rising sun.

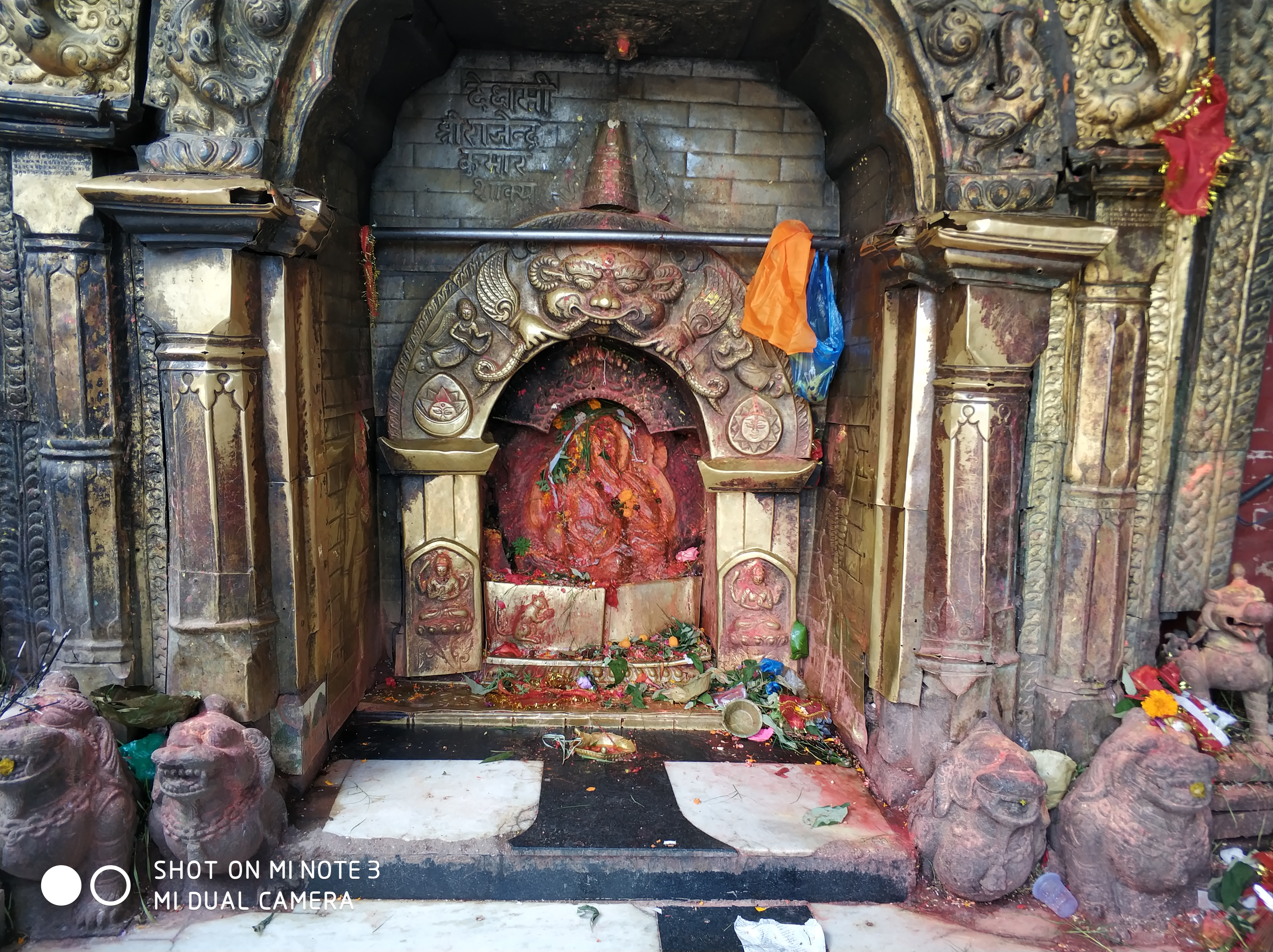
Suryavinayak Temple

== Location ==
The temple is located about two kilometres from Kathmandu. It is situated in a forest and can only be reached on foot.

== History ==
The temple is believed to have been originally built over 1500 years ago. The temple was built in the time of the Lichhavi King Vishnu Dev Barma.[2]
