= Mahabouddha Temple =

Buddhist temple in Lalitpur, Nepal

Mahaboudha Temple
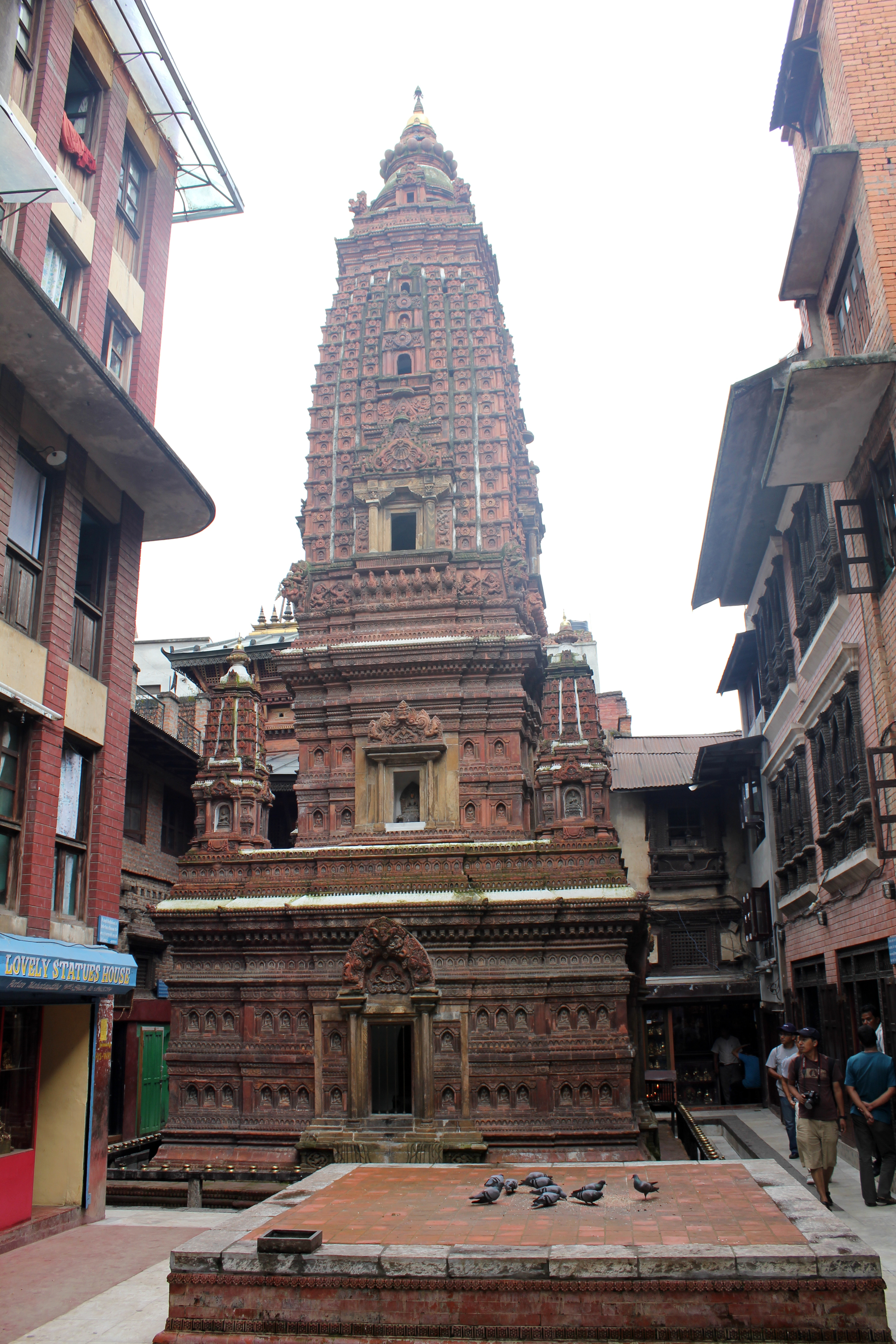
- Mahaboudha Temple in 2013

- Location within Bagmati Province Location within Nepal

Religion
- Affiliation: Buddhism other_info =: Sect: [[{{{sect}}}]]
- District: Lalitpur District
- Province: Bagmati Province
- Deity: Lord Buddha

Location
- Location: Okubahal
- Country: Nepal
- Interactive map of Mahaboudha Temple
- Coordinates: 27.668974266035832°N 85.32735378340799°E

Architecture
- Type: Shikhar Style

Mahaboudha Temple is a shikhara Newar Buddhist temple in Lalitpur, Nepal.

The temple dates back to 1585 and it was rebuilt after the 1934 Nepal–India earthquake. Mahaboudha's design is loosely based on the Mahabodhi Temple, Bodh Gaya.
