= Dadhikot =

Dadhikot दधिकोट
- Municipilaty
- Location in Nepal
- Coordinates: 27°38′24″N 85°24′0″E
- Country: Nepal
- Zone: Bagmati Zone
- District: Bhaktapur District

Population (1991)
  - Total: 5,818
  - Religions: Hindu
- Time zone: UTC+5:45 (Nepal Time)

Dadhikot (Nepali: दधिकोट) is a city in Suryabinyak municipality which is located at Bhaktapur District in the Bagmati Zone of central Nepal. At the time of the 1991 Nepal census it had a population of 5,818 with 1,031 houses in dadhikot is popular with the help of charkhandi temple and bindhabasini temple it.
