= Kailashnath Mahadev Statue =

Shiva statue in Sanga, Nepal

- कैलाशनाथ महादेव
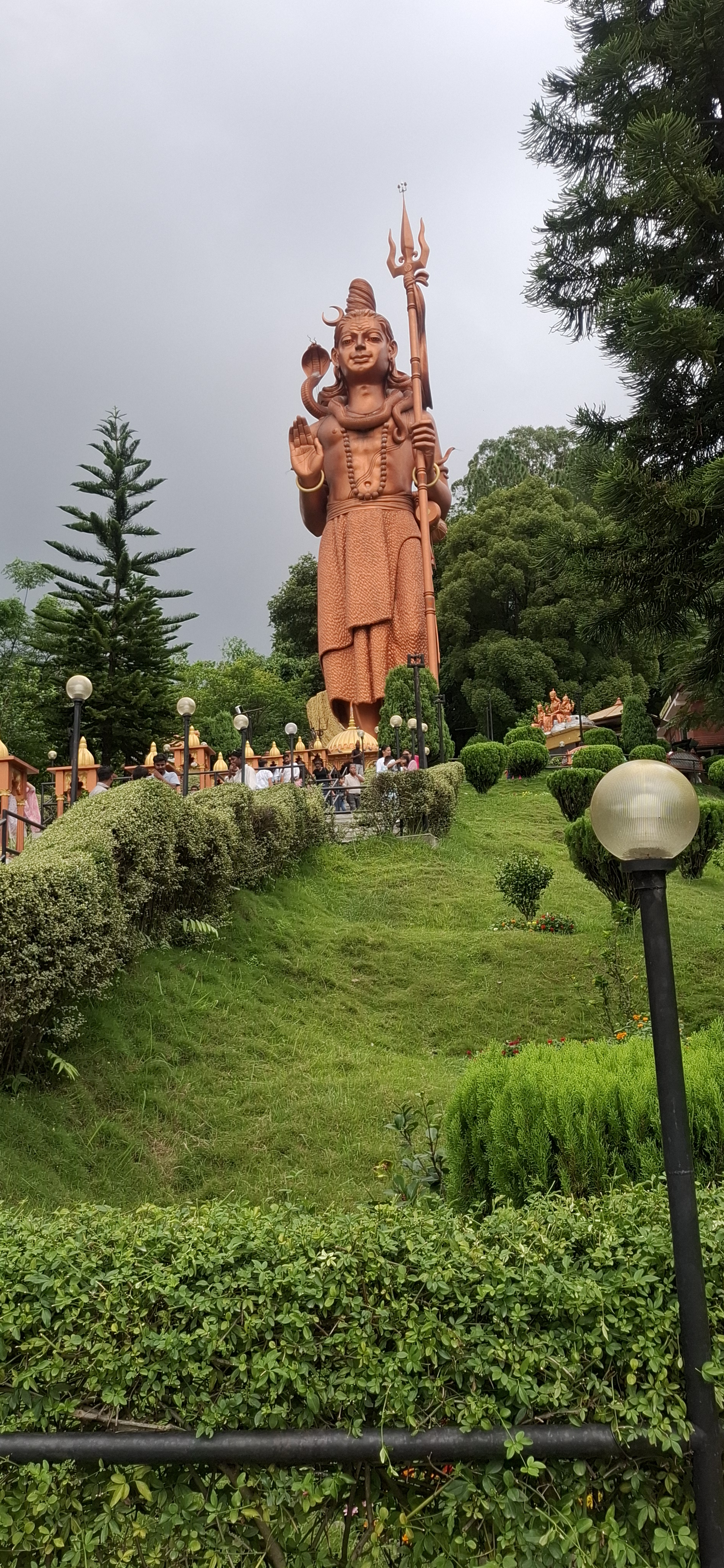
- Kailashnath Mahadev Statue at Sanga, Bhaktapur
- Interactive map of Kailashnath Mahadev Statue
- Location: Sanga, Suryabinayak Municipality, Bhaktapur District, Nepal
- Coordinates: 27.6461°N 85.4743°E
- Builder: Kamal Jain and Hilltake Group of Companies
- Type: Statue
- Material: Steel, concrete, zinc and copper
- Height: 143 ft (44 m)
- Beginning date: 2003
- Completion date: 2010
- Opening date: 21 June 2011; 15 years ago
- Dedicated to: Shiva (भगवान शिव, महादेव)

Kailashnath Mahadev Statue (Nepali: कैलाशनाथ महादेव) is a huge statue of the Hindu deity Shiva (शिव जी, महादेव) located in Sanga, Bhaktapur District, Nepal. The statue is approximately 143 feet (43.5 metres) high and depicts Shiva in a standing posture. It is situated approximately 20 km east of Kathmandu and has become a religious and tourist landmark in the Kathmandu Valley region.

Completed in 2010, the statue is primarily made of steel, concrete, zinc and copper. It is associated with Kamal Jain and the Nepal-based Hilltake Group of Companies. The monument is located on an elevated hillside.

The statue has been described by several sources as the world's tallest statue of Shiva.

== History ==
The Kailashnath Mahadev Statue was conceived as a monumental representation of Shiva and as a religious landmark in the Sanga area. Construction began in 2003 and the main structure was completed around 2010. The monument was formally opened on 21 June 2011 during the Teej festival.

The project was primarily associated with businessman Kamal Jain and the Hilltake Group of Companies, a Nepal-based company established in 1992. Nepalese engineers and construction workers participated in the design and construction of the monument.

== Design and construction ==
The Kailashnath Mahadev Statue was designed to represent Shiva (शिव जी) in a standing form. At approximately 143 feet (43.5 metres), it is a large-scale religious sculpture visible from the surrounding Sanga area.

The statue was constructed using steel, concrete, zinc and copper. The combination of structural steel and concrete provides the principal support for the monument, while zinc and copper form important elements of its exterior appearance.

The statue was constructed on an elevated hillside at Sanga, presenting engineering and geological challenges. Its foundation extends approximately 100 feet into the ground and was designed to anchor the structure securely to the ridge.

Nepalese engineers were involved in the design and construction of the structure, which required the coordination of large-scale structural, foundation and hillside-stabilization works.

== Religious symbolism ==
The monument incorporates several traditional attributes associated with Shiva and Hindu iconography. Shiva is shown holding a trishula (त्रिशूल), or trident, one of his principal attributes. His raised hand is depicted in a blessing or protective gesture.

A serpent (नाग) is represented around Shiva's body, reflecting the important role of serpents in traditional representations of the deity. The statue is also associated with Nandi (नंदी), Shiva's sacred bull and traditional vahana (वाहन).

The wider religious site includes representations of the Shiva lingam (शिवलिंग), one of the principal symbols used in the worship of Shiva.

These elements connect the monument with established traditions of Shiva iconography and Hindu religious art.

== Religious significance ==
Kailashnath Mahadev is dedicated to Shiva, one of the principal deities of Hinduism. Shiva is worshipped throughout Nepal and is known by numerous names, including Mahadev (महादेव), Shankar (शंकर), Neelkanth (नीलकंठ) and Pashupati (पशुपति).

The name Kailashnath refers to Shiva as the lord of Mount Kailash (कैलाश पर्वत), which Hindu traditions associate with the deity's dwelling place. The monument's name and iconography therefore connect the site with the wider religious traditions surrounding Shiva and Mount Kailash.

The site is visited by Hindu devotees throughout the year, with religious activity increasing during major Hindu festivals and observances associated with Shiva. Maha Shivaratri, Teej and other Hindu festivals are important occasions for pilgrimage and worship at Shiva temples and religious sites in Nepal.

== Location and setting ==
The statue is located at Sanga in Suryabinayak Municipality, Bhaktapur District. Sanga lies along the Araniko Highway, an important road connecting Kathmandu and Bhaktapur with Banepa and Dhulikhel.

== Tourism ==
The Kailashnath Mahadev Statue is a religious and cultural landmark in the Sanga area and is included among notable Shiva sites in the Kathmandu Valley by the Nepal Tourism Board. The board describes the monument as a 143-foot Shiva statue located at Sanga.

The statue is located along the Araniko Highway, which connects the Kathmandu Valley with Banepa and Dhulikhel. The surrounding area includes religious sites, settlements and hospitality facilities serving visitors to Sanga and the wider Kathmandu Valley.

Fortune Resort & Wellness Spa Bhaktapur, part of the ITC Hotels group, is a hospitality property located in the Sanga area of Bhaktapur District. The resort provides accommodation, dining, wellness and event facilities and is situated near the Kailashnath Mahadev Statue.

== Gallery ==
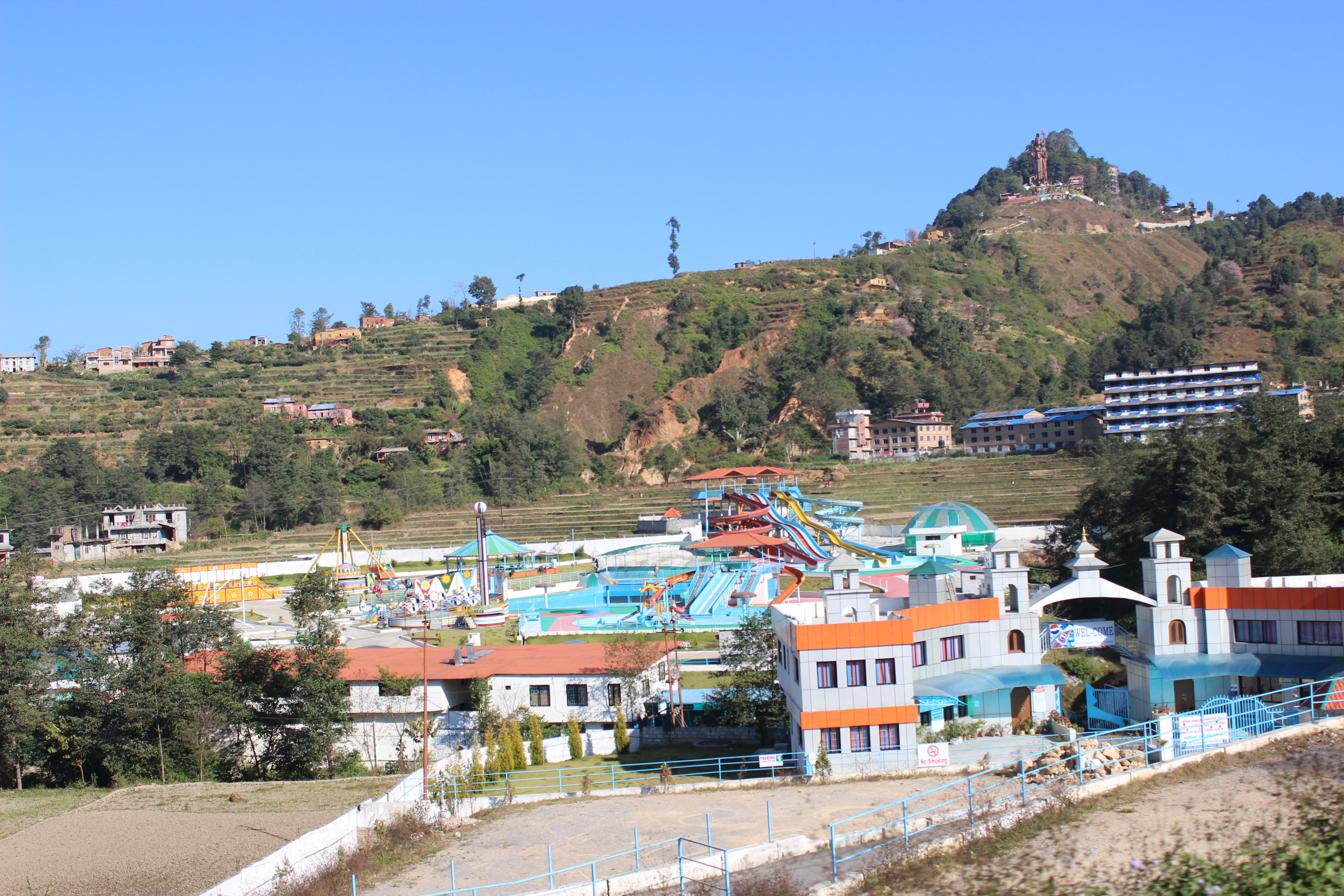
Kailashnath Mahadev and the surrounding hillside

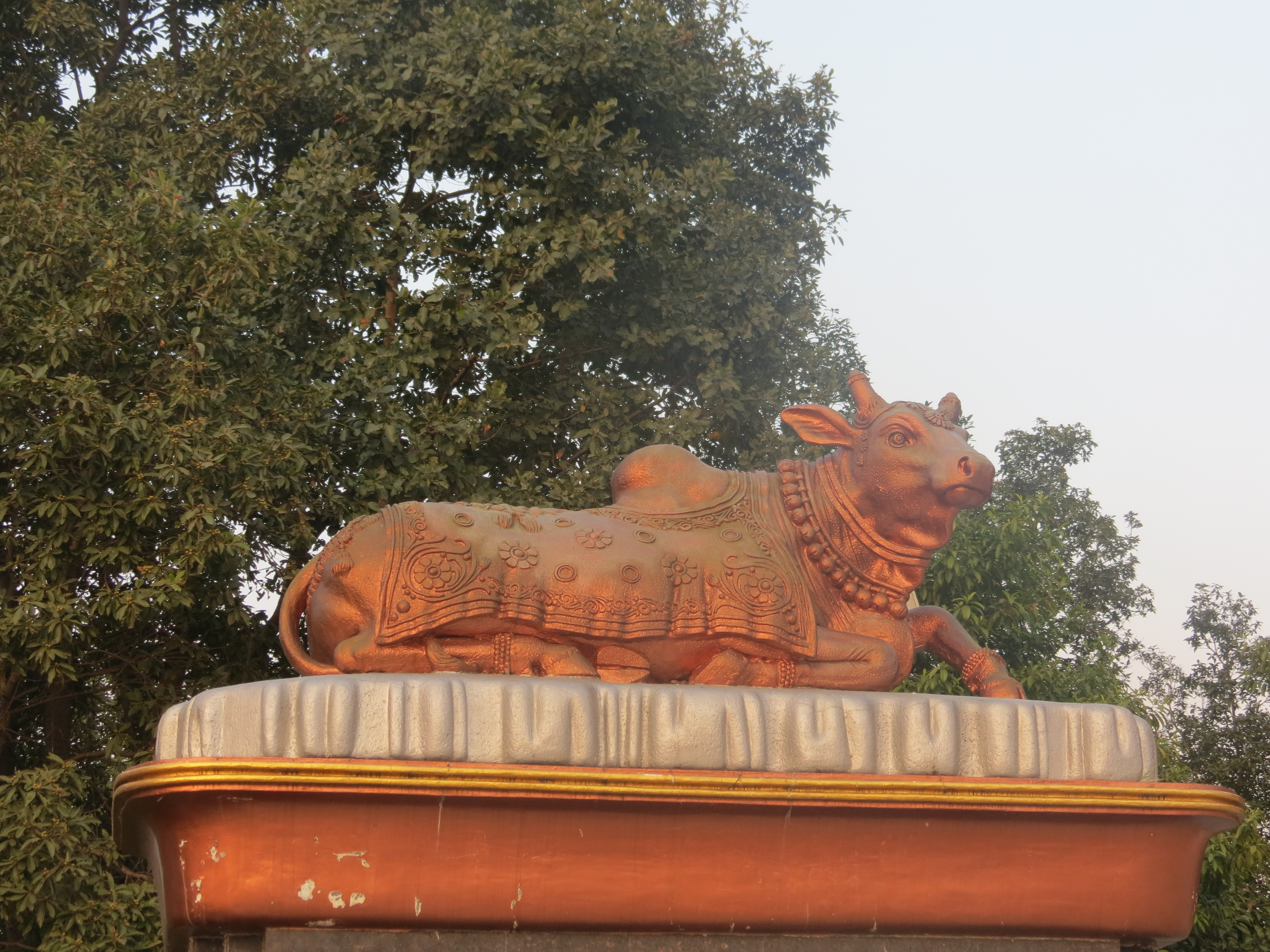
Kailashnath Mahadev Statue

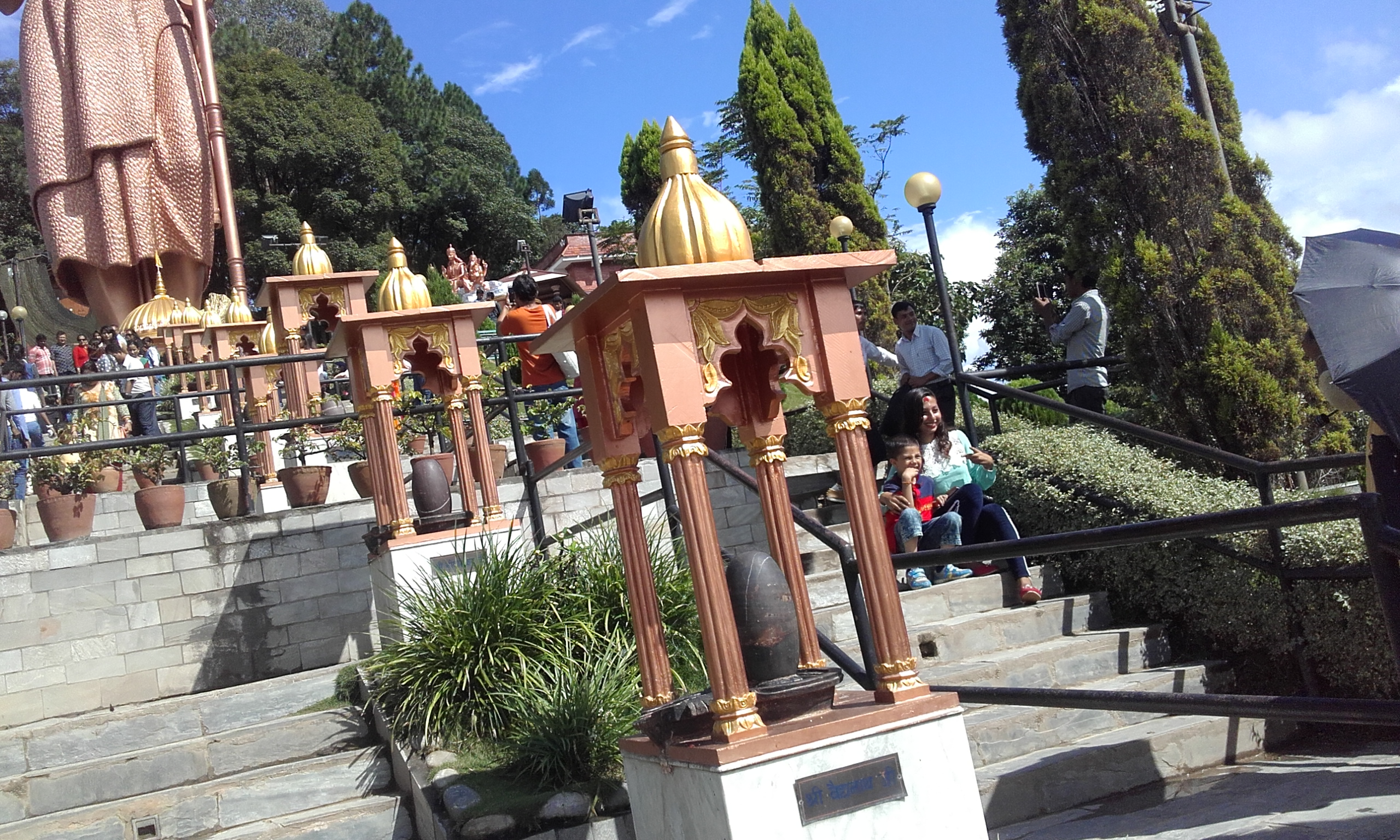
Side view of Kailashnath Mahadev

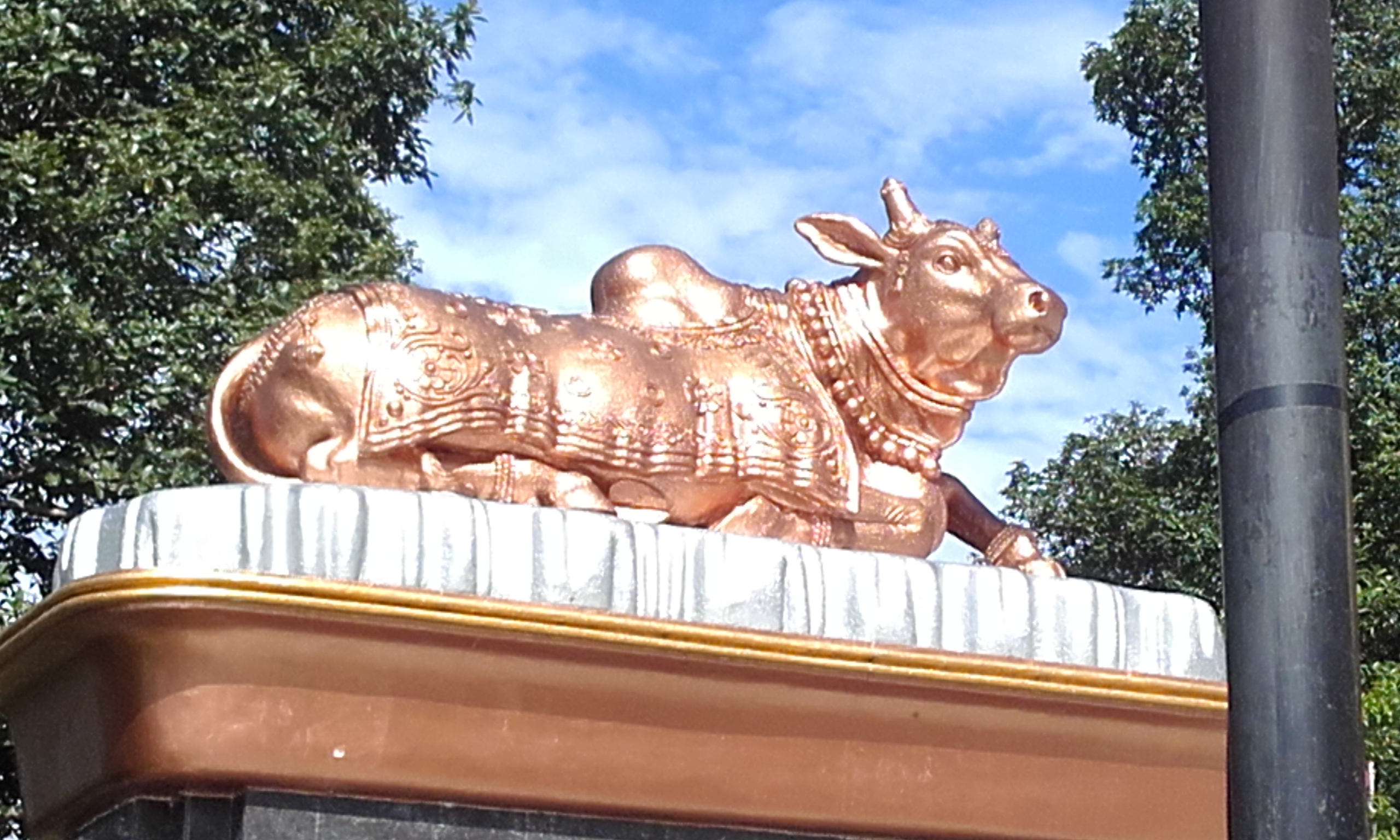
Kailashnath Mahadev and surrounding landscape

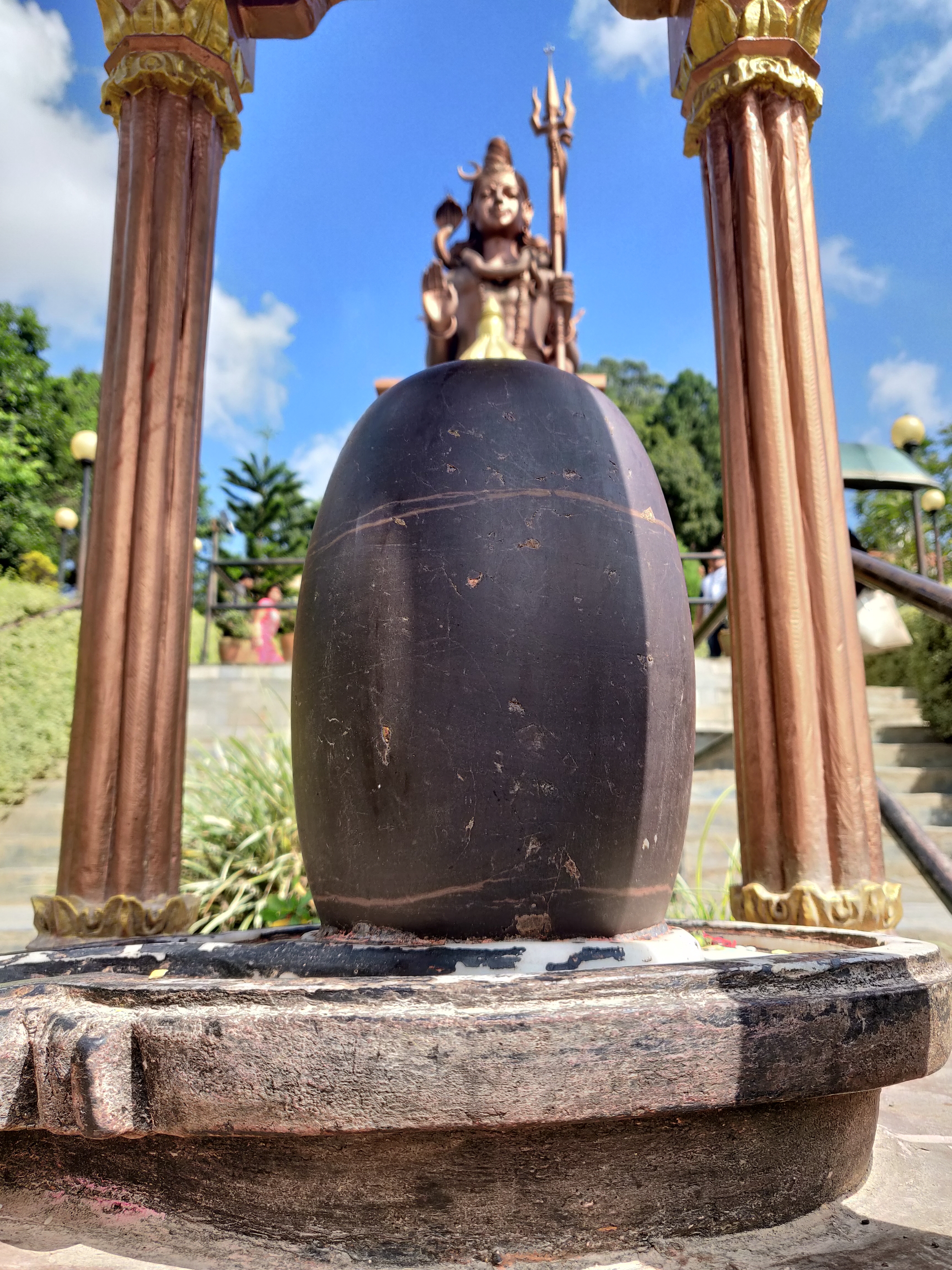
Kailashnath Mahadev viewed from the approach

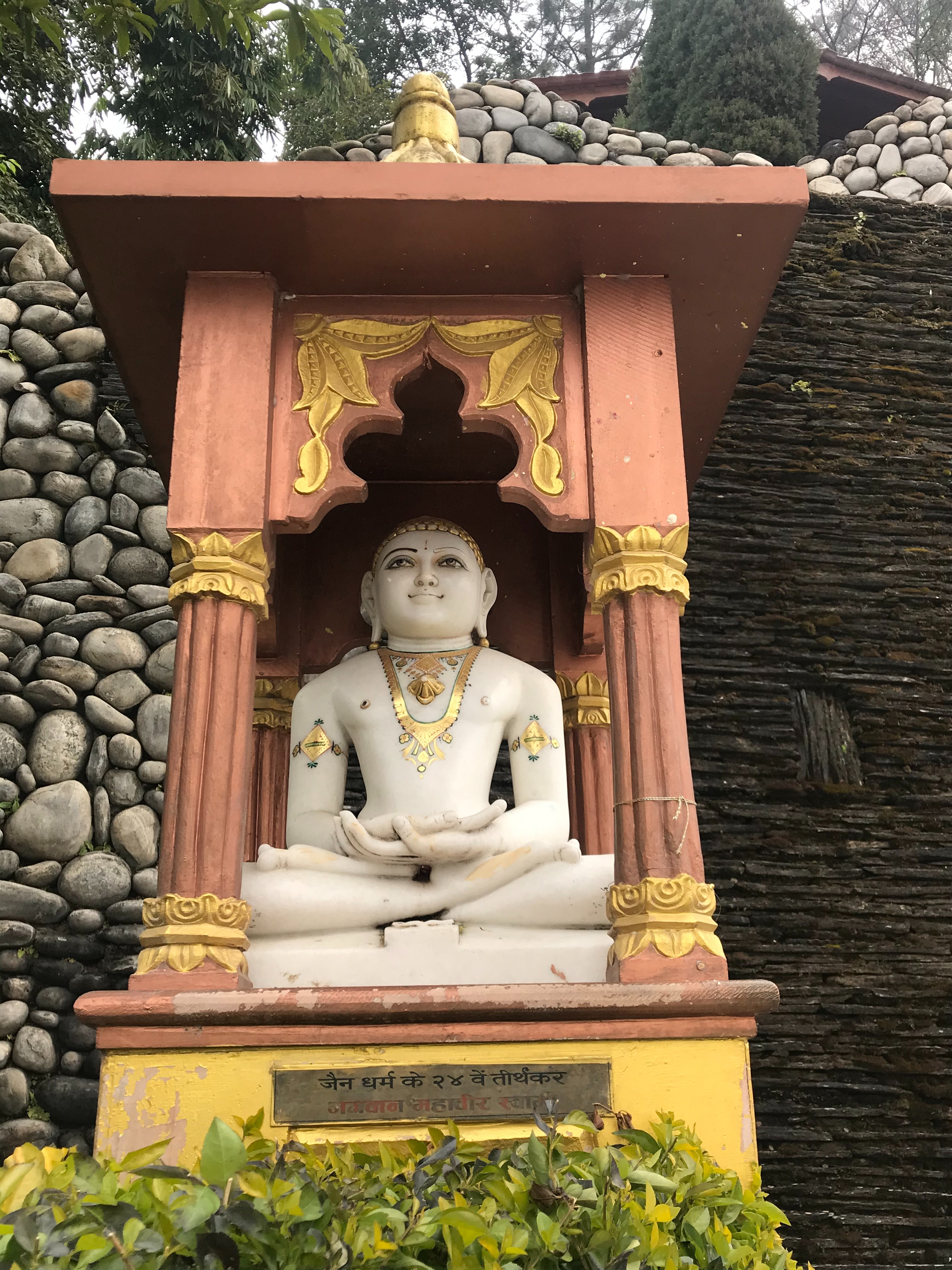
Kailashnath Mahadev and Sanga

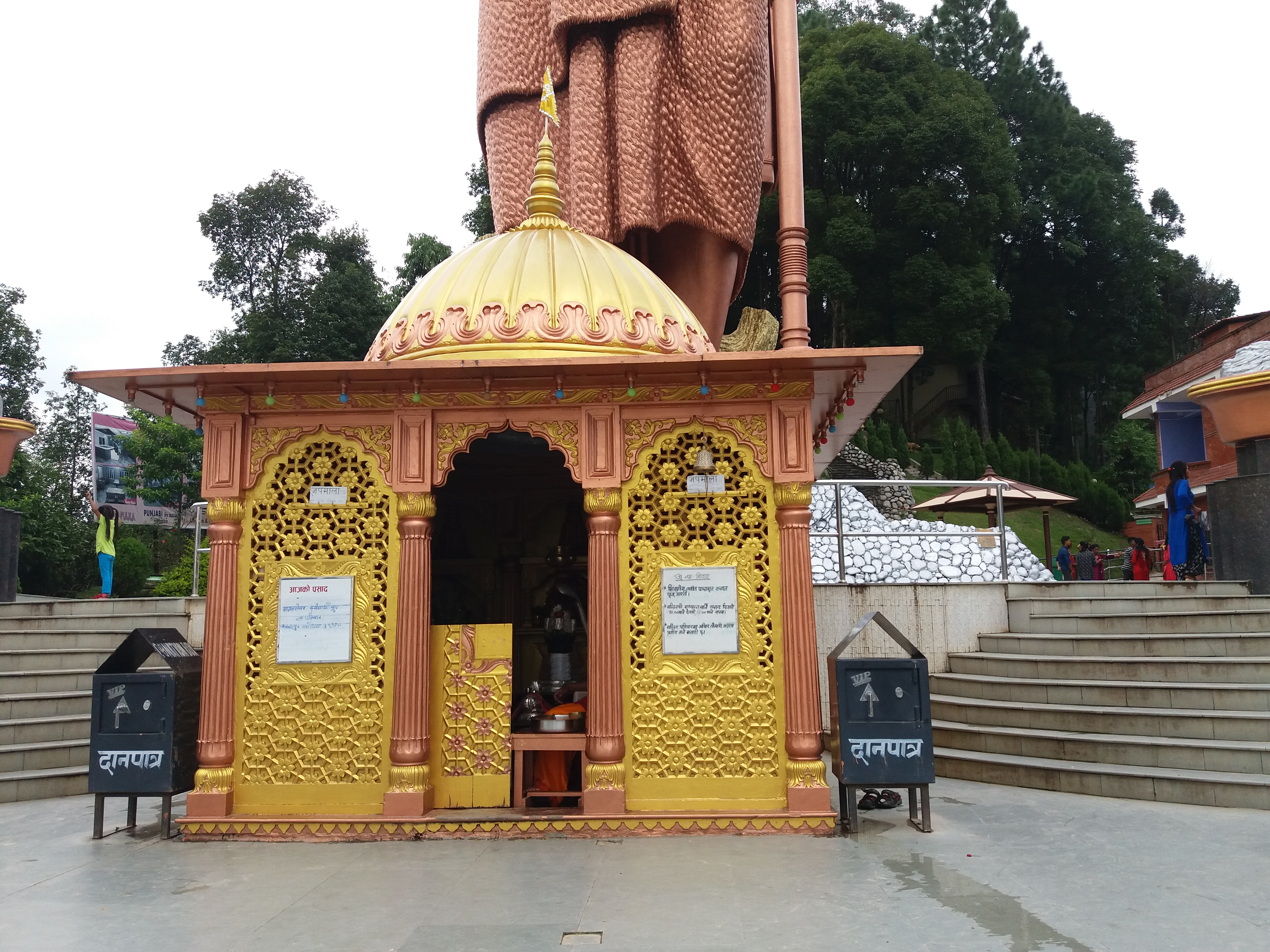
Shiva religious site near Kailashnath Mahadev

== See also ==
- Shiva
- Mount Kailash
- Hinduism in Nepal
- Nasiksthan Sanga
- Bhaktapur District
- Kathmandu Valley
- Tourism in Nepal
- List of tallest Hindu statues
- List of Hindu temples in Nepal
