= Kathmandu Valley =

Valley and proposed territory in Nepal

Kathmandu Valley काठमाडाैँ उपत्यका Nepa Valley, नेपा: उपत्यका, 𑐳𑑂𑐰𑐣𑐶𑐐𑑅
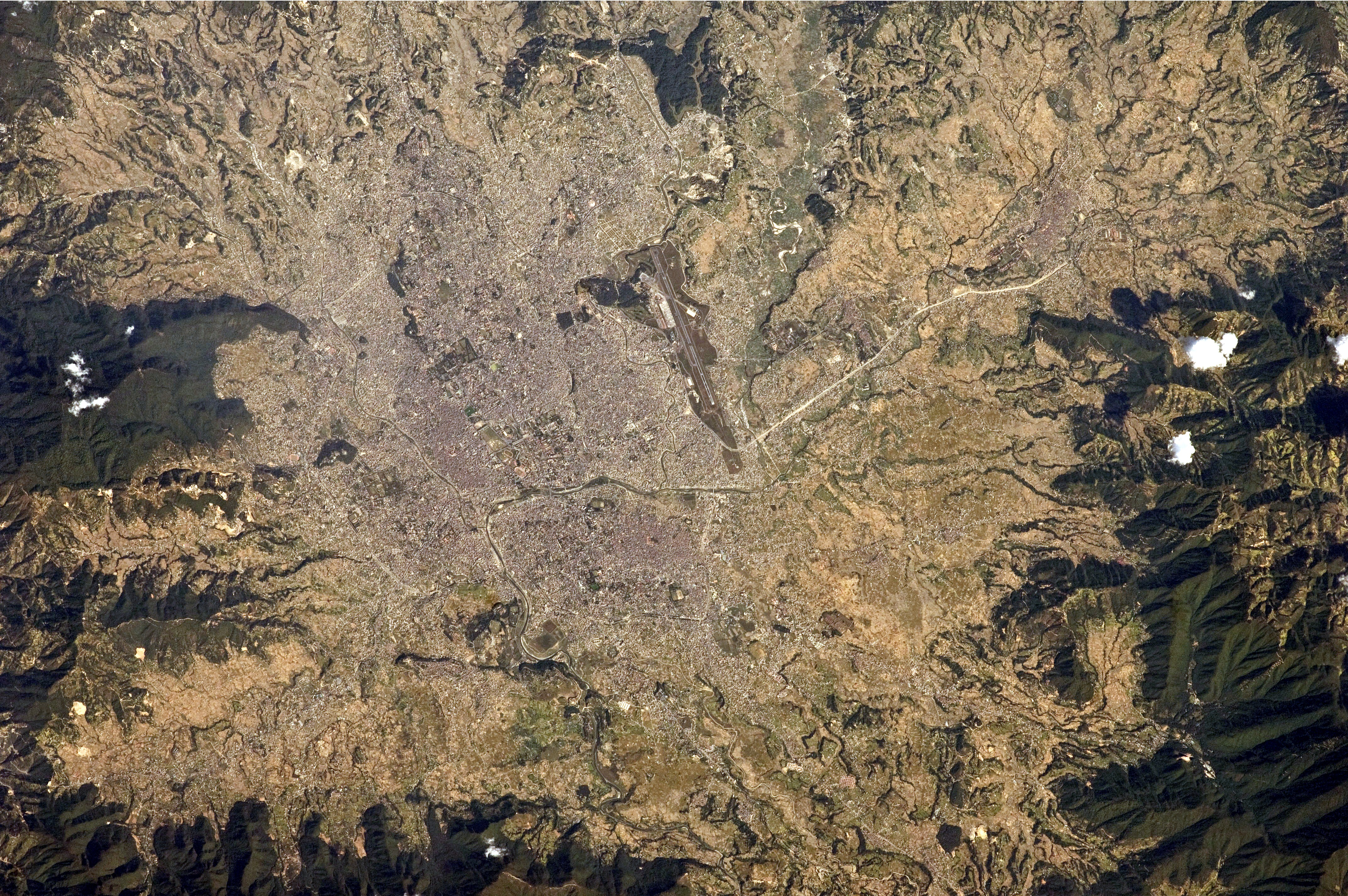
- Kathmandu Valley seen from the space by the NASA Earth Observatory

- Location in Province Kathmandu Valley (Nepal) Kathmandu Valley (Asia)
- Coordinates: 27°42′14″N 85°18′31″E
- Country: Nepal
- Province: Bagmati Province
- Districts: Kathmandu, Lalitpur, Bhaktapur

UNESCO World Heritage Site
- Criteria: Cultural: (iii), (iv), (vi)
- Reference: 120bis
- Inscription: 1979 (3rd Session)
- Extensions: 2006
- Endangered: 2003–2007
- Area: 665 km^{2} (257 sq mi)

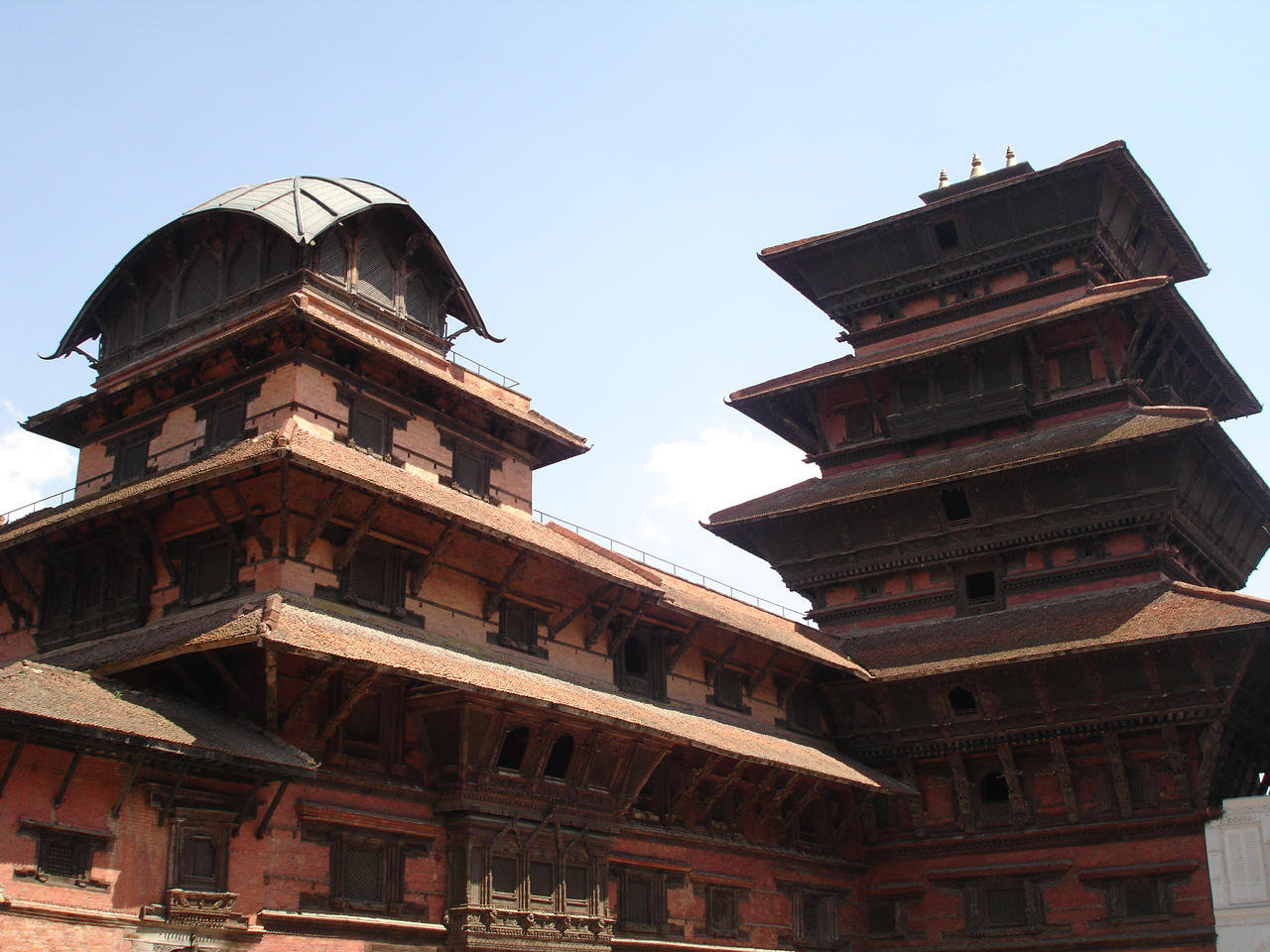
The Durbar Square in Kathmandu

The Kathmandu Valley (Nepali: काठमाडाैँ उपत्यका), also known as the Nepal Valley, Nepa Valley or Swaniga: (Nepali: नेपाः उपत्यका, Nepal Bhasa: 𑐣𑐾𑐥𑐵𑑅 𑐐𑐵𑑅, नेपाः गाः or 𑐳𑑂𑐰𑐣𑐶𑐐𑑅, स्वनिगः), National Capital Area, is a bowl-shaped valley located in the Himalayan mountains of Nepal. It lies at the crossroads of ancient civilizations of the Indian subcontinent and the broader Asian continent, and has at least 130 important monuments, including several pilgrimage sites for Hindus and Buddhists. The valley holds seven World Heritage Sites within it.

The Kathmandu Valley is the most developed and the largest urban agglomeration in Nepal with a population of about 5 million people. The urban agglomeration of Kathmandu Valley includes the cities of Kathmandu, Lalitpur, Bhaktapur, Changunarayan, Budhanilkantha, Tarakeshwar, Gokarneshwar, Suryabinayak, Tokha, Kirtipur, Madhyapur Thimi, and others. The majority of offices and headquarters are located in the valley, making it the economic hub of Nepal. It is popular with tourists for its unique architecture, and rich culture which includes the highest number of jatras (festivals) in Nepal. Kathmandu Valley itself was referred to as "Nepal Proper" by British historians. As per the World Bank, the Kathmandu Valley was one of the fastest growing metropolitan areas in South Asia with 2.5 million population by 2010 and an annual growth rate of 4%.

In 2015, Kathmandu Valley was hit by the April 2015 Nepal earthquake. The earthquake caused thousands of deaths and the destruction of many infrastructure across the Kathmandu Valley, which included the towns of Lalitpur, Kirtipur, Madhyapur Thimi, Changunarayan, and Bhaktapur. Kathmandu is also the largest city in the Himalayan hill region.

== Etymology ==
Historically, the valley and adjoining areas made up a confederation known as the Nepal Mandala. Until the 15th century, Bhaktapur was its capital, when two other capitals, Kathmandu and Lalitpur, were established. Until the 1960s, the Kathmandu Valley was known as the Nepala Valley or Nepa Valley. In 1961 the valley was listed as Kathmandu District, which began referring to the valley as Kathmandu Valley. The term Nepa Valley is still used among Newar people and local governments, while senior citizens still tend to refer to the valley as Nepal. The term Swaniga (Nepal Bhasa: 𑐳𑑂𑐰𑐣𑐶𑐐𑑅, स्वनिगः) refers to the three cities of Yẽn (Nepal Bhasa: 𑐫𑐾𑑃, येँ), Yala (Nepal Bhasa: 𑐫𑐮, यल), and Khwapa (Nepal Bhasa: 𑐏𑑂𑐰𑐥, ख्वप) ie. Kathmandu, Lalitpur and Bhaktapur respectively.

The Nepali name Kathmandu comes from the corruption of the word Kasthamandap (Sanskrit: काष्ठमण्डप, "wooden pavilion"), a structure in the Kathmandu Durbar Square. This unique temple is also known as the Maru Sattal (Nepal Bhasa: 𑐩𑐬𑐸𑐳𑐟:, मरुसत:), it was built in 1596 by King Lakshmi Narasimha Malla. The entire structure contains no iron nails or supports and is made entirely from wood. Legend has it that the timber used for this three-story pagoda was obtained from a single tree.

== History ==
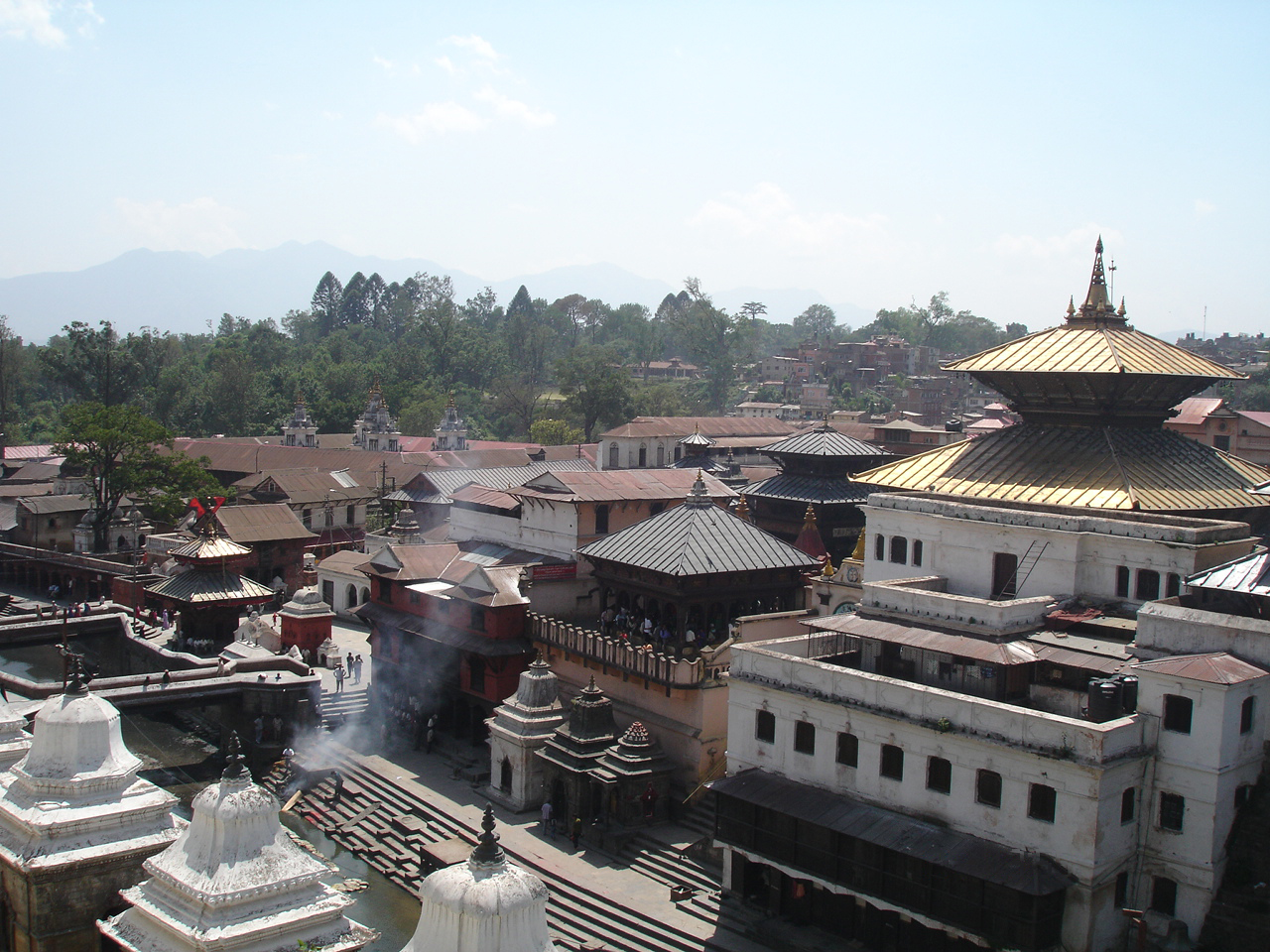
Pashupatinath Temple, dedicated to Pashupati

=== Newars ===
The Newars are the indigenous inhabitants and the creators of the historic civilization of the valley. Their language is known as Newar language, not to be confused with Nepali language. They are understood to be the descendants of the various ethnic and racial groups that have inhabited and ruled the valley in the two-millennium history of the place. Scholars have also described the Newars as a nation.

Newari architecture consists of the pagoda, stupa, shikhara, chaitya and other styles. The valley's trademark is the multiple-roofed pagoda which may have originated in this area; a famous artisan who influenced stylistic developments in China and Tibet was Araniko, a Newar who traveled to the court of Kublai Khan in the 13th century AD.

== Mythology ==
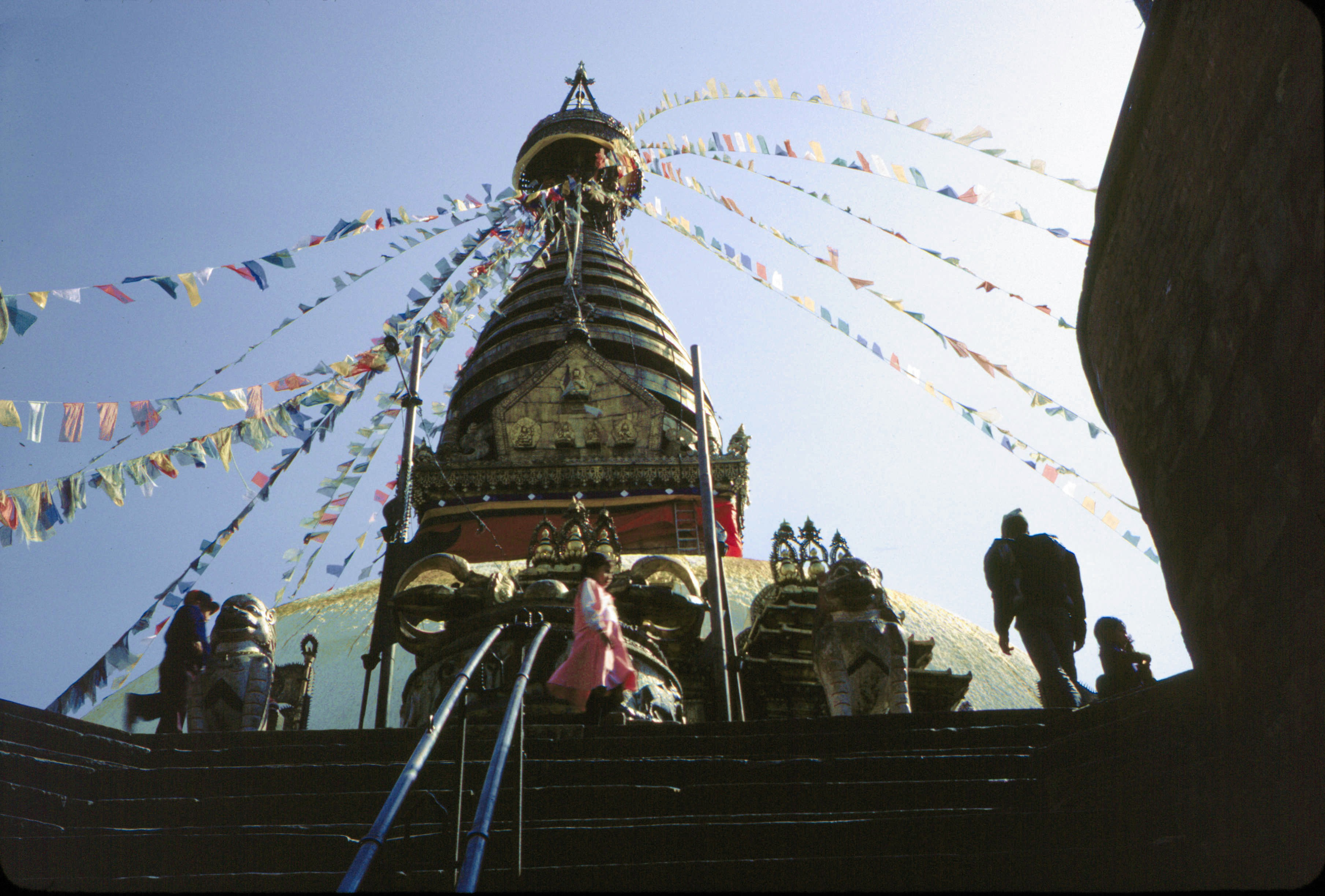
Swayambhunath

According to the Swayambhu Purana, the Kathmandu Valley was once a lake known as Nagahrada and inhabited by Nāgas. According to the legend, Vipassī Buddha planted a lotus seed in the lake, which grew into a thousand-petalled lotus bearing a radiant manifestation of the primordial Buddha principle, known as the Dharmadhatu or Svayambhu. The legend associates the manifestation with the Five Great Buddhas Vairocana, Akshobhya, Ratnasambhava, Amitābha and Amoghasiddhi. Later, Bodhisattva Manjushri arrived at the lake to pay homage to the sacred manifestation and drained the lake by cutting a gorge with his sword through the southern hills at Chobhar, making the valley accessible for human settlement. The lake's Nagas were allowed to remain in the valley's ponds and water bodies.

A different account on the origin of the valley appears in Hindu traditions, which refers to Krishna draining the lake by cutting through the southern hills with his Sudarshana Chakra, allowing the water to flow out. The Gopals who accompanied him subsequently settled in the valley and became its first inhabitants.

== Geography ==
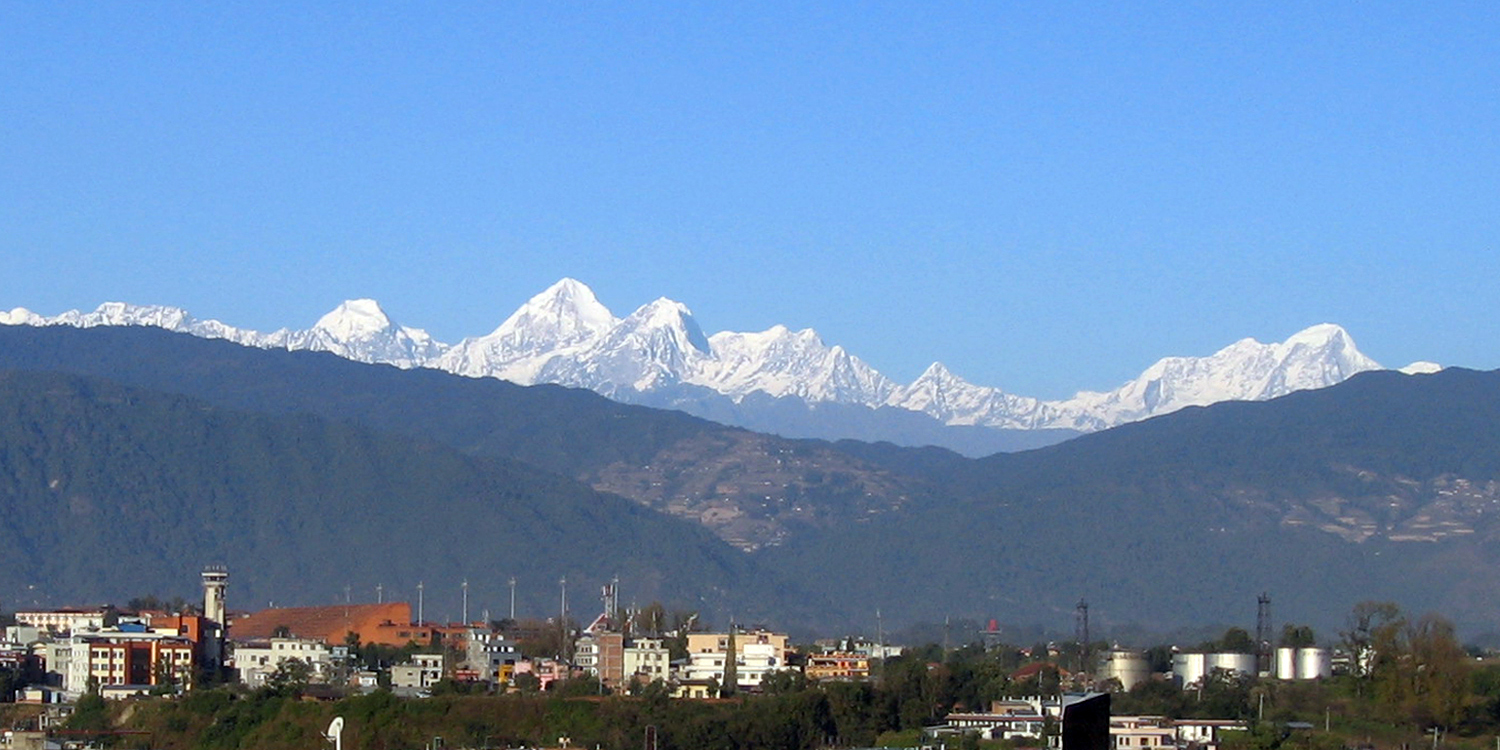
Mountain view from Kathmandu Valley

The Kathmandu Valley is a cultural and political hub of Nepal. It was accorded the status of a World Heritage Site by UNESCO in the year 1979. In 2003, UNESCO listed several sites as being "endangered" out of concern for the ongoing loss of authenticity and the outstanding universal value of the cultural property. The endangered status was lifted in 2007. The following seven sites in the valley are World Heritage Sites:

- Bhaktapur Durbar Square
- Changu Narayan Temple
- Boudhanath Stupa
- Pashupatinath Temple
- Kathmandu Durbar Square
- Patan Durbar Square
- Swayambhunath

== Notable areas ==
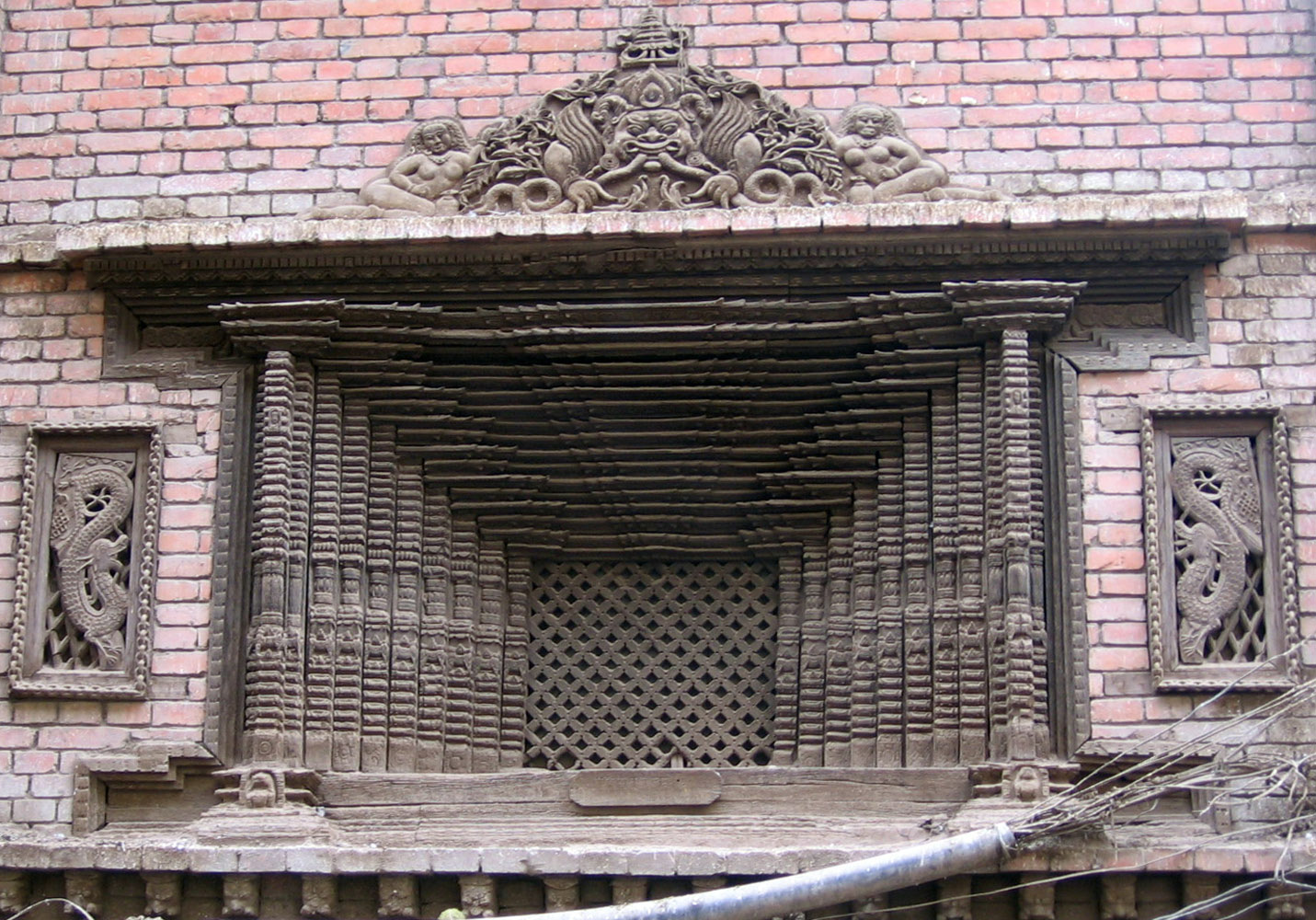
Dese Maru Jhya, the only window of its kind in the country

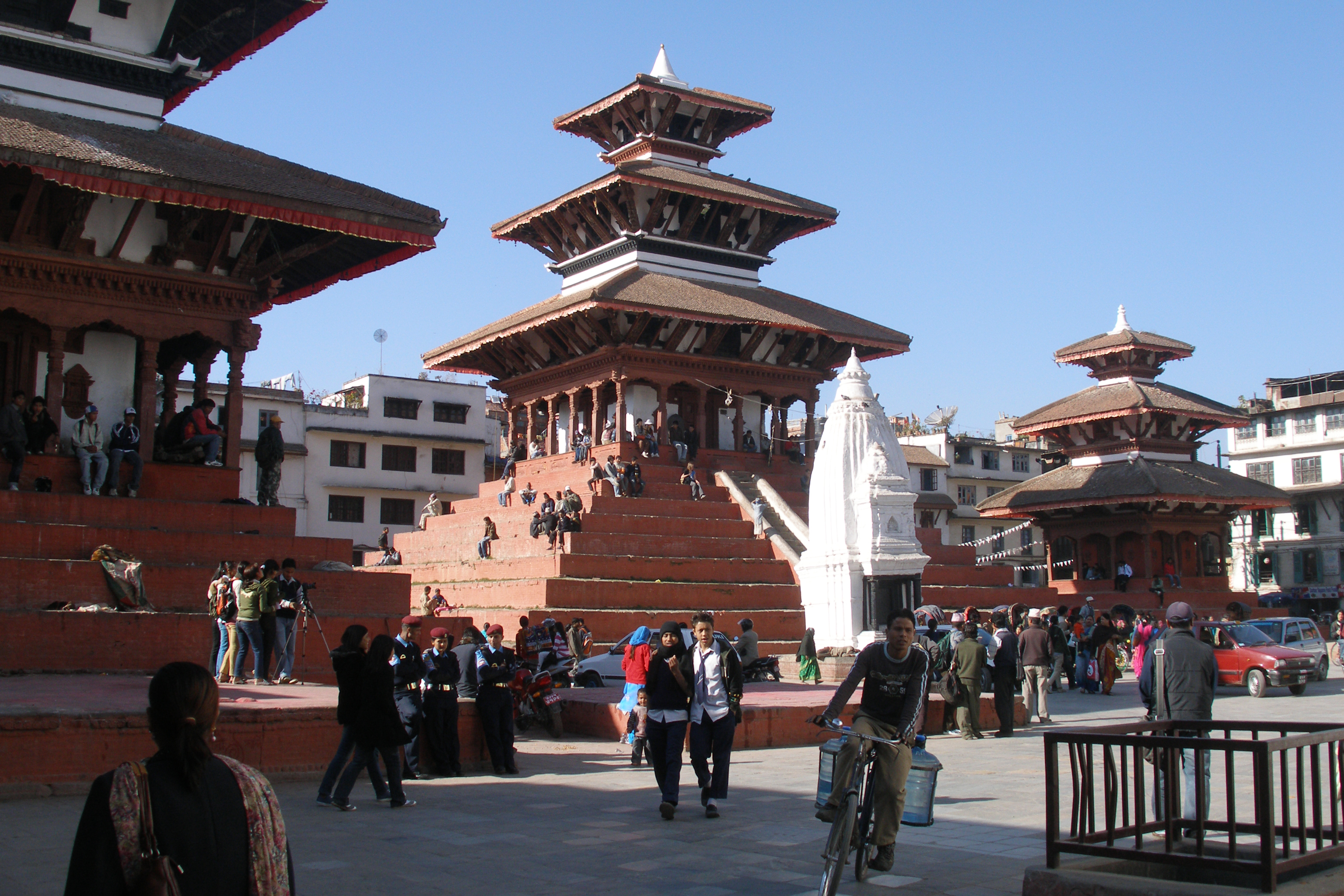
Kathmandu Durbar Square

Notable areas include:

- Bhaktapur District
  - Balkumari temple
  - Doleshwor Mahadeva Temple
  - Kailashnath Mahadev Statue
  - Pujarimath Museum
  - Suryavinayak Temple
- Kathmandu District
  - Aakash Bhairav Temple
  - Ashok Binayak Temple
  - Aditnath Temple
  - Ajima Temple
  - Bagh Bhairab Temple
  - Bajrayogini Temple
  - Budhanilkantha Temple
  - Chandra Binayak Temple
  - Chandragiri Hill
  - Dakshinkali Temple
  - Dharahara
  - Garden of Dreams
  - Ghanta Ghar
  - Gokarneshwor Mahadev temple
  - Guhyeshwari Temple
  - Jal Binayak Temple
  - Kasthamandap
  - Kopan Monastery
  - Narayanhiti Palace
  - Ranipokhari
  - Ratna Park
  - Seto Machindranath
  - Shiva Parvati Temple
  - Taleju Temple
  - Taragaon Museum
  - Taudaha Lake
  - Thrangu Tashi Yangtse Monastery
- Lalitpur District
  - Balkumari temple
  - Hiranya Varna Mahavihar Temple
  - Kumbheshwar temple complex
  - Mahabouddha Temple
  - Nagdaha lake
  - Rato Machchhindranath Temple

== Demographics ==
Kathmandu Valley has total population of 2,996,341.

== Kathmandu (National Capital Area) ==
Kathmandu (NCT) काठमाण्डौ (राष्ट्रिय राजधानी क्षेत्र)
- Proposed Territory
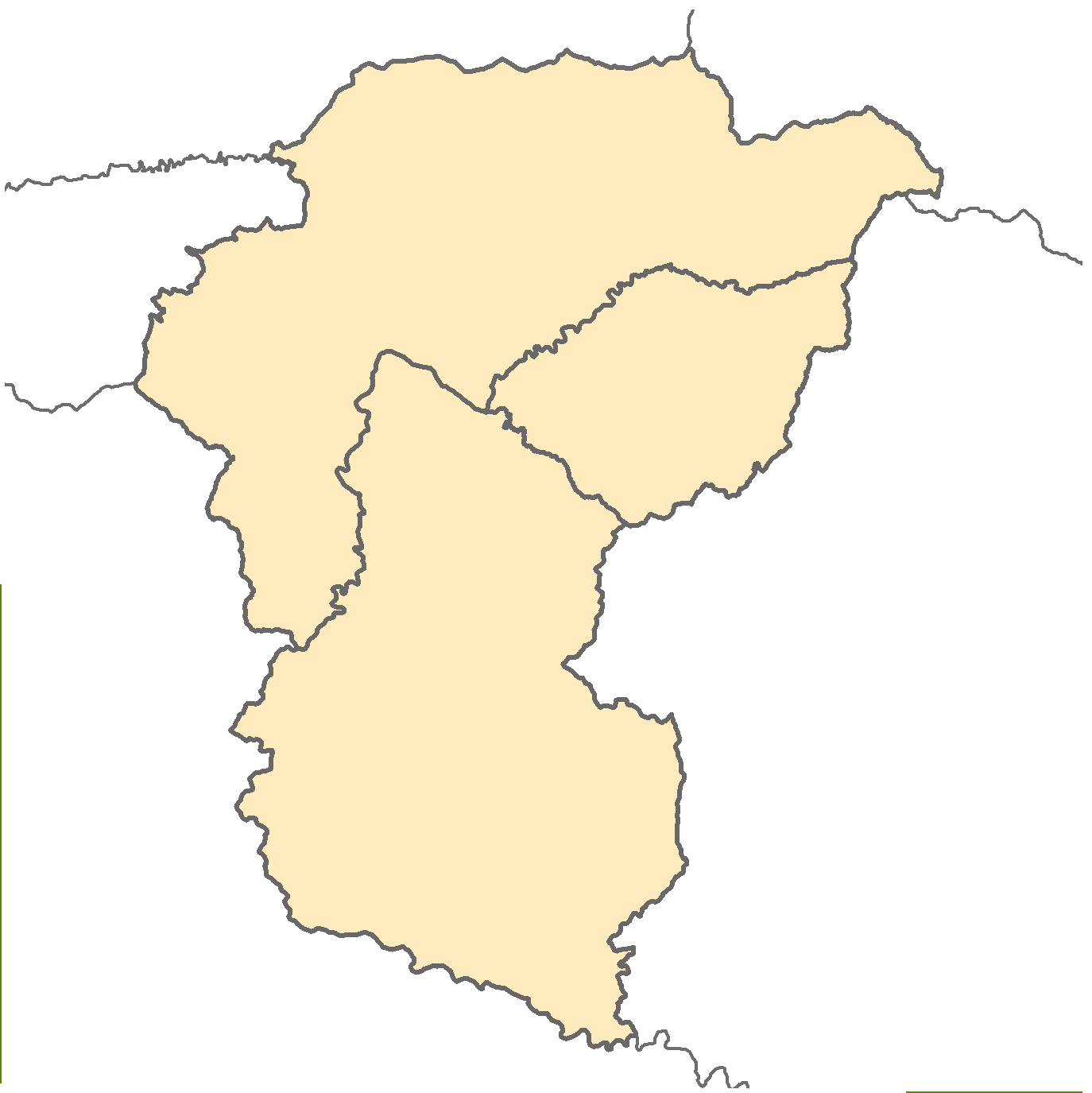
- Kathmandu Valley (a separate territory)
- Interactive map of Kathmandu (NCT)
- Country: Nepal
- Capital Territory: Kathmandu

Area
  - Total: 902.61 km^{2} (348.50 sq mi)

Population (2021)
  - Total: 2,996,341

In 2015, the Government of Nepal proposed to develop Kathmandu valley as a separate national capital territory.

Kathmandu Valley consists of three districts of Bagmati Province whose total population is 2,996,341 and total area is 933.73 km^{2} (360.52 sq mi)

District	Area	Population (2021)
Kathmandu District	413.69 km^{2} (159.73 sq mi)	2,017,532
Bhaktapur District	123.12 km^{2} (47.54 sq mi)	430,408
Lalitpur District	396.92 km^{2} (153.25 sq mi)	548,401
Kathmandu NCT	933.73 km^{2} (360.52 sq mi)	2,996,341

=== Included cities ===
Cities population of Kathmandu Valley as per 2021 Nepal census.

Name	District	Population (2021)	Area (km^{2})	Density (/km^{2})
Kathmandu	Kathmandu District	845,767	49.45	17,103
Lalitpur	Lalitpur District	299,843	36.12	8,301
Budhanilkantha	Kathmandu District	179,688	34.8	5,163
Tarakeshwar	Kathmandu District	151,508	54.95	2,757
Gokarneshwar	Kathmandu District	151,200	58.5	2,585
Suryabinayak Municipality	Bhaktapur District	137,971	42.45	3,250
Chandragiri Municipality	Kathmandu District	136,928	43.9	3,119
Tokha	Kathmandu District	135,741	17.11	7,933
Kageshwari-Manohara	Kathmandu District	133,327	27.38	4,870
Madhyapur Thimi	Bhaktapur District	119,955	11.47	10,458
Mahalaxmi, Lalitapur	Lalitpur District	118,710	26.51	4,478
Nagarjun Municipality	Kathmandu District	115,507	29.85	3,870
Godawari, Lalitpur	Lalitpur District	100,972	96.11	1,051
Changunarayan	Bhaktapur District	88,612	62.98	1,407
Kirtipur	Kathmandu District	81,782	14.76	5,541
Bhaktapur	Bhaktapur District	78,854	6.89	11,445
Dakshinkali	Kathmandu District	26,372	42.6	619
Shankharapur	Kathmandu District	29,316	60.21	487

== See also ==
- Culture of Nepal
- Dolakha Newar language
- Battle of Kirtipur
- Battle of Kathmandu
- Battle of Lalitpur
- Stone inscriptions in the Kathmandu Valley
