= Bhaktapur District =

- District
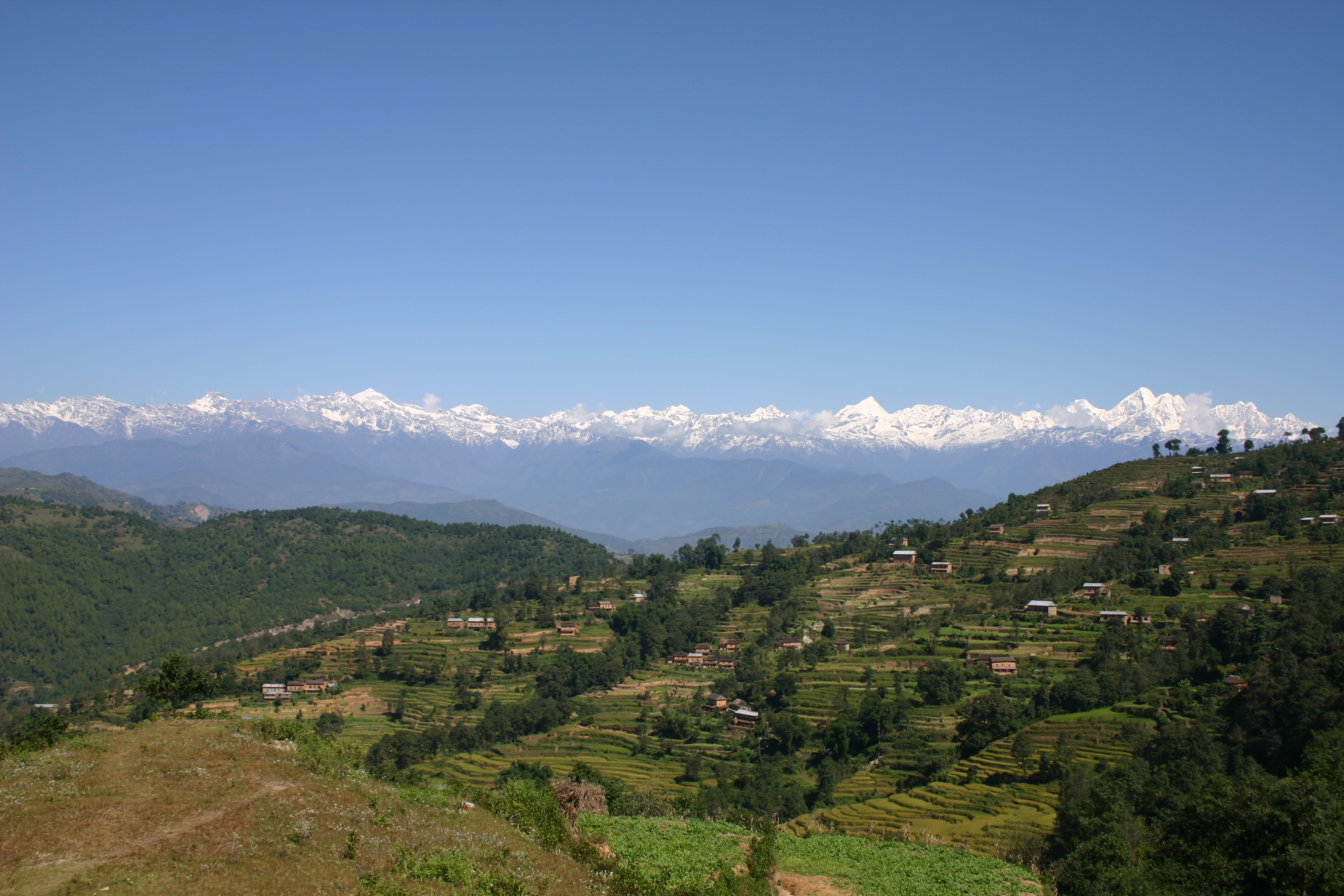
- Kathmandu Valley, Bhaktapur District
- Nickname: Khwopa
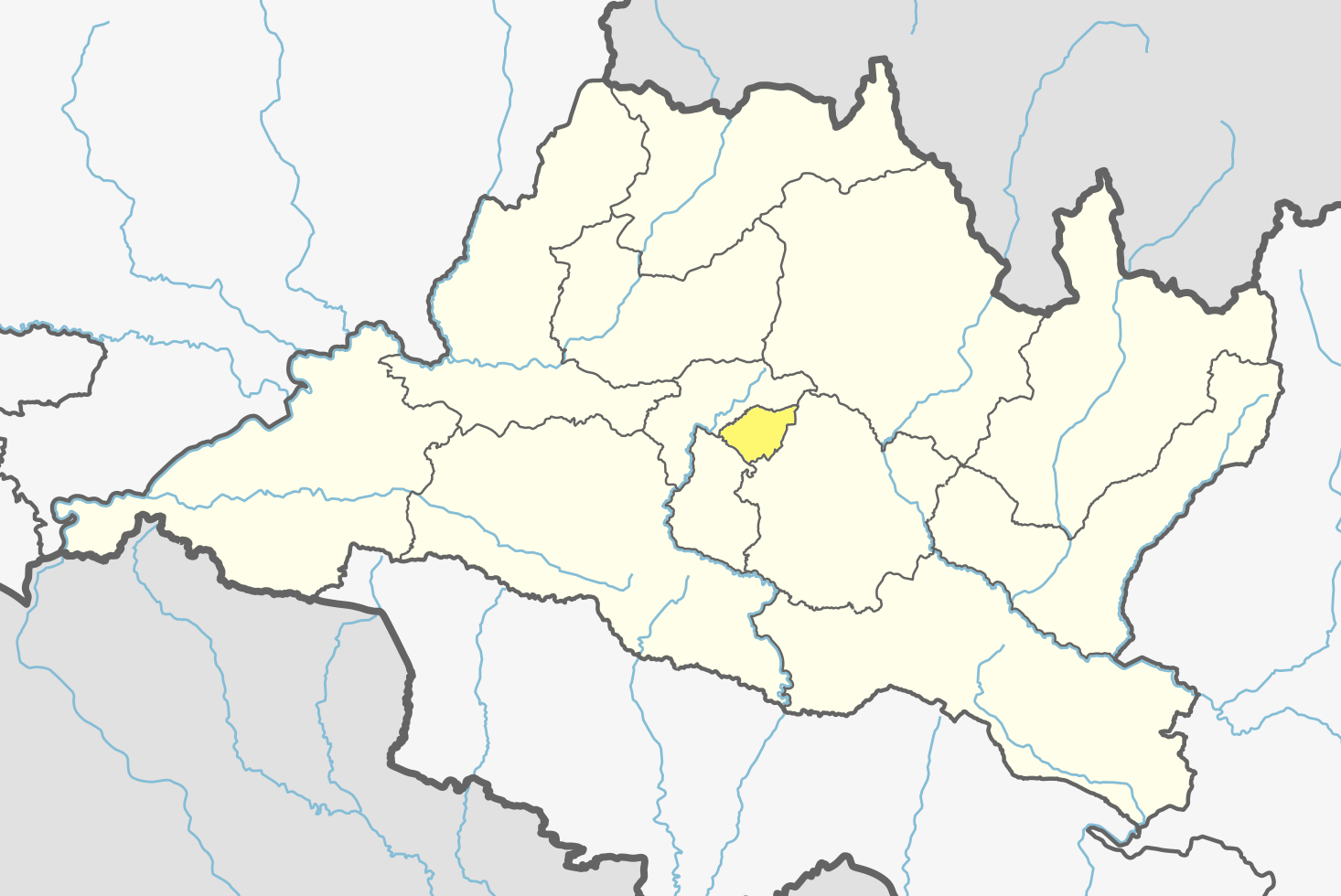
- Location in Bagmati Province
- Coordinates: 27.672222°N 85.427778°E
- Country: Nepal
- Province: Bagmati Province
- Headquarters: Bhaktapur

Area
  - Total: 119 km^{2} (46 sq mi)

Population (2011)
  - Total: 304,651
  - Density: 2,560/km^{2} (6,630/sq mi)
- 2001 pop.: 225,461; 1991 pop.: 172,952; 1981 pop.: 159,767
- Time zone: UTC+5:45 (NPT)
- Area code: +977-1

Bhaktapur District (Nepali: भक्तपुर जिल्ला; Nepal Bhasa: ख्वप देश (जिल्ला)) located in the eastern part of Kathmandu valley, is the smallest among seventy-seven districts of Nepal. It is part of Bagmati Province. Bhaktapur District Post Office is 44800. The district, with Bhaktapur as its district headquarters, covers an area of 119 km^{2} (46 sq mi) and in 2011 had a population of 304,651 of whom 9,701 people were absent (mostly working abroad).

== Education ==
The average literacy rate of Bhaktapur is 81.68% (male 90.48%, female 72.65%), which is growing with educational awareness.

== Geography and climate ==
Climate Zone	Elevation Range	% of Area
Subtropical	1,000 to 2,000 meters 3,300 to 6,600 ft.	99.4%
Temperate	2,000 to 3,000 meters 6,400 to 9,800 ft.	0.6%

== Demographics ==
Historical population
Census year	Pop.	±% p.a.
1981	159,767	—
1991	172,952	+0.80%
2001	225,461	+2.69%
2011	304,651	+3.06%
2021	430,408	+3.52%
Source: Citypopulation

At the time of the 2021 Nepal census, Bhaktapur District had a population of 432,132. 6.48% of the population is under 5 years of age. It has a literacy rate of 87.96% and a sex ratio of 978 females per 1000 males. The entire population lived in municipalities.

Castes/ethnic groups in Bhaktapur District (2021)
1. Newar (35.6%)
2. Chhetri (21.9%)
3. Bahun (17.2%)
4. Tamang (10.4%)
5. Magar (2.98%)
6. Rai (1.77%)
7. Kami (1.23%)
8. Other Hill Janjati (2.45%)
9. Madheshi non-Dalit (1.93%)
10. Khas non-Dalit (1.44%)
11. Khas Dalit (1.44%)
12. Others (1.68%)

Ethnicity wise: Khas are the largest group, making up 43% of the population. Newars are the largest single group, making up 36% of the population. Hill Janjatis, mainly Tamang and Magar, make up 18% of the population.

Languages of Bhaktapur district (2021)
1. Nepali (50.5%)
2. Nepal Bhasha (32.7%)
3. Tamang (9.53%)
4. Magar (1.51%)
5. Maithili (1.44%)
6. Others (4.25%)

At the time of the 2021 census, 50.55% of the population spoke Nepali, 32.72% Nepal Bhasha, 9.53% Tamang, 1.51% Maithili and 1.44% Magar as their first language. In 2011, 45.9% of the population spoke Nepali as their first language.

Religion in Bhaktapur District (2021)
Religion	Percent
Hinduism	86.40%
Buddhism	9.93%
Christianity	2.02%
Kirat Mundhum	1.14%
Islam	0.49%
Other or not stated	0.02%

== Municipalities ==
The district is divided into four municipalities:

- Bhaktapur
- Changunarayan
- Madhyapur Thimi
- Suryabinayak Municipality

== Places of interest ==
- Bhaktapur Durbar Square
- Nagarkot
- Changu Narayan
- Kailashnath Mahadev Statue
- Fortune Resort & Wellness Spa - Member ITC Hotels
- Bode

== Gallery ==
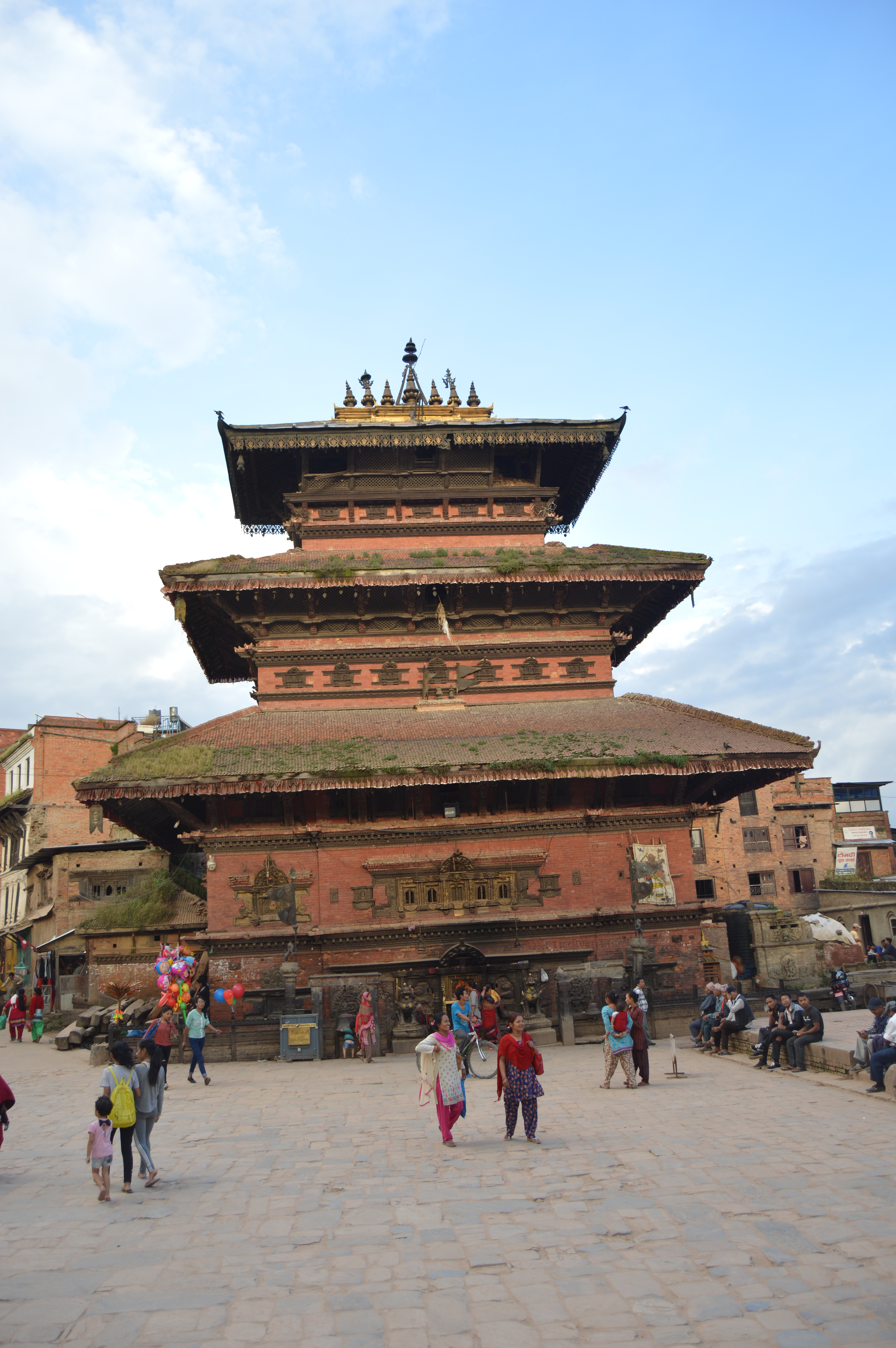
Bhairavnath Temple, Bhaktapur Durbar Square

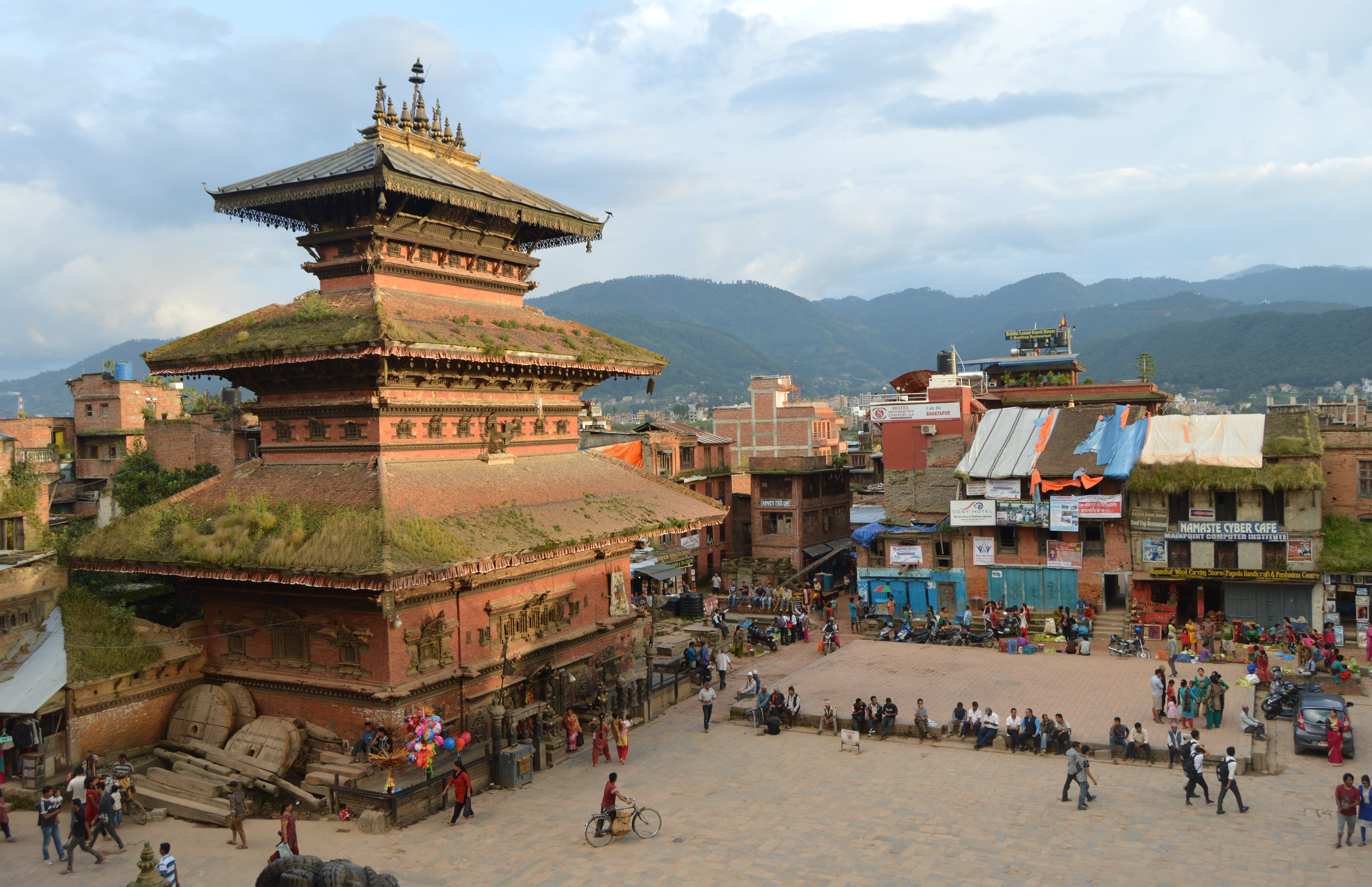
Taumadhi Square, Bhaktapur Durbar Square

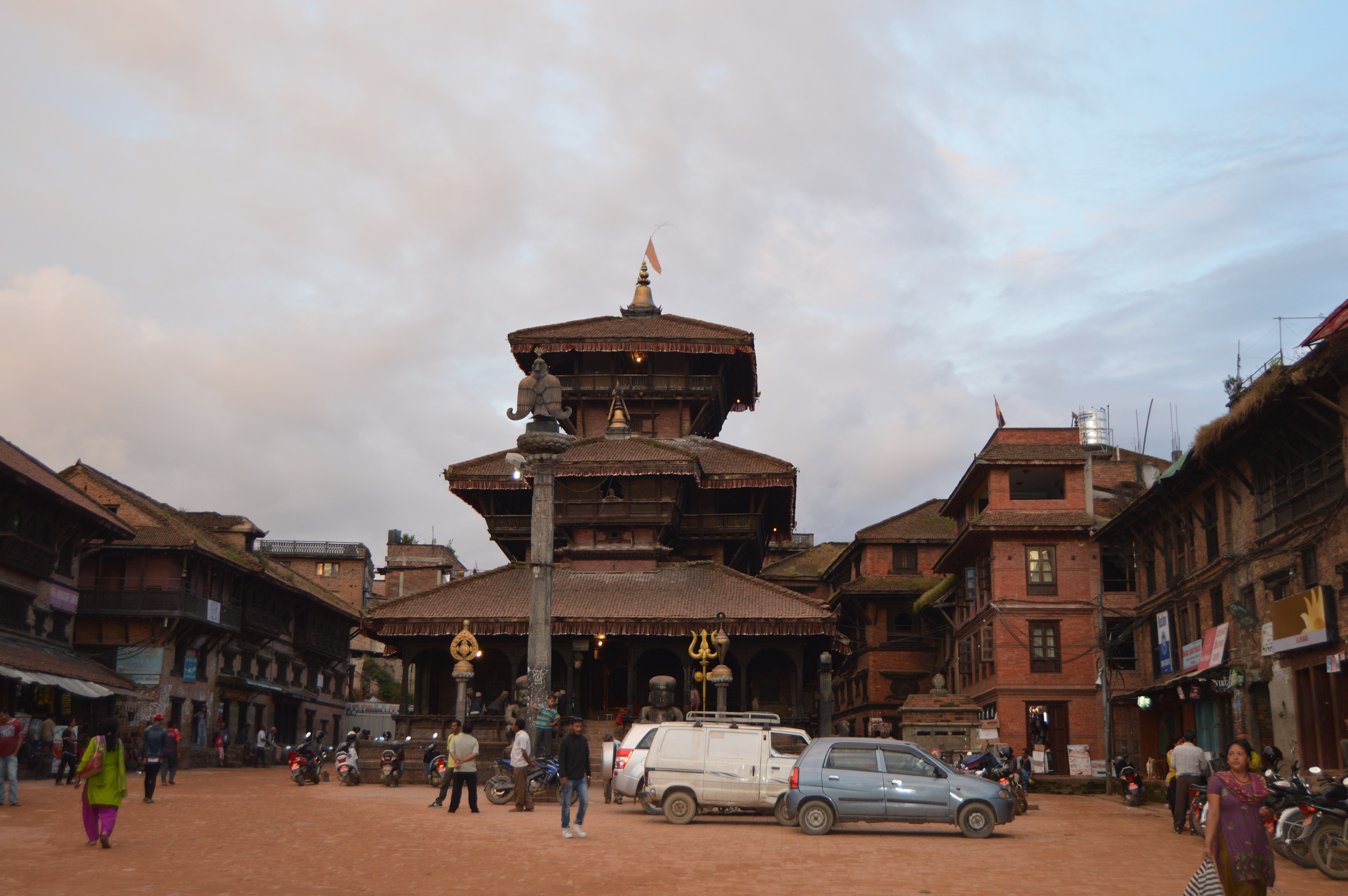
Dattatreya Temple, Bhaktapur Durbar Square

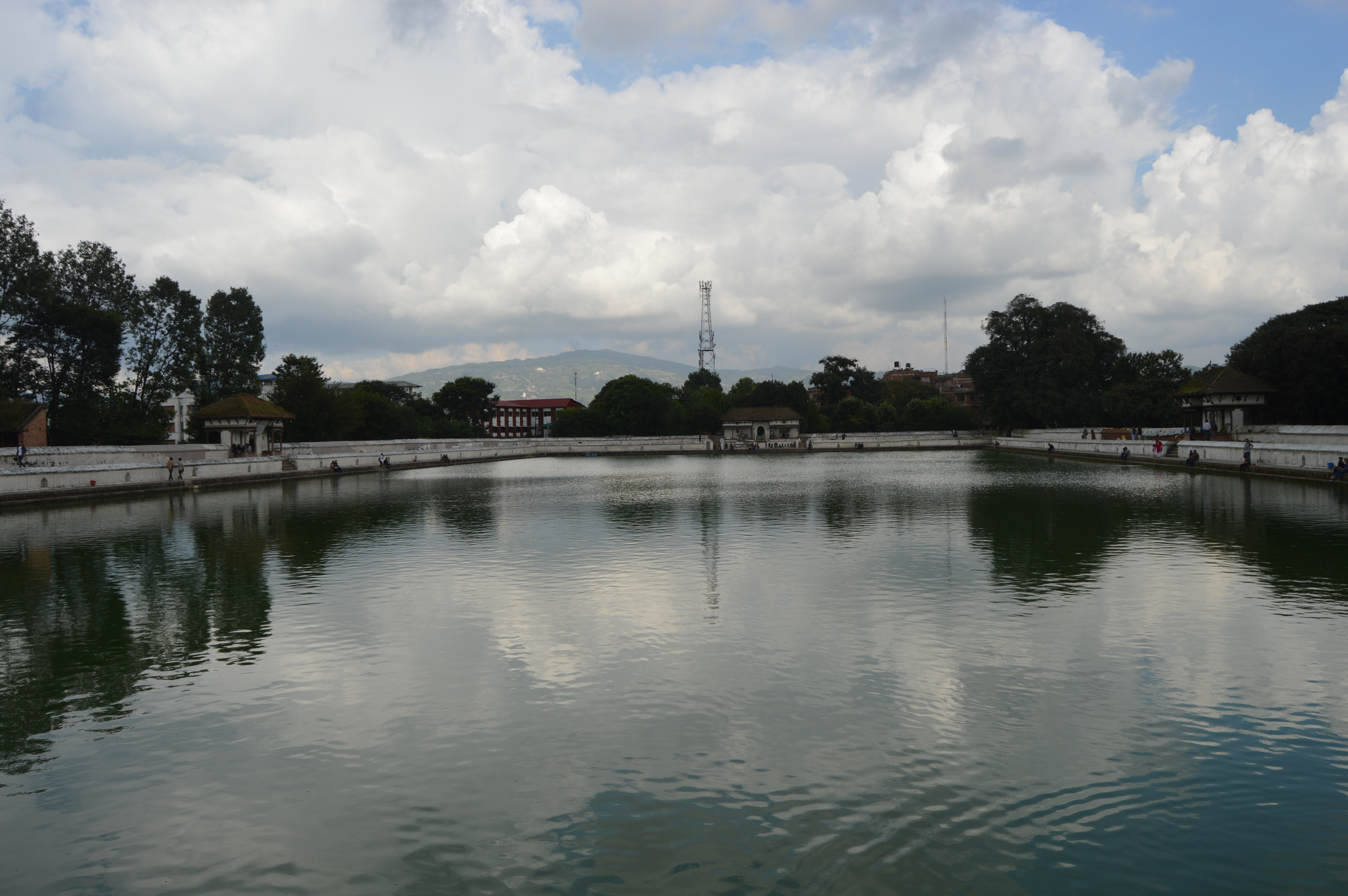
Siddha Pokhari

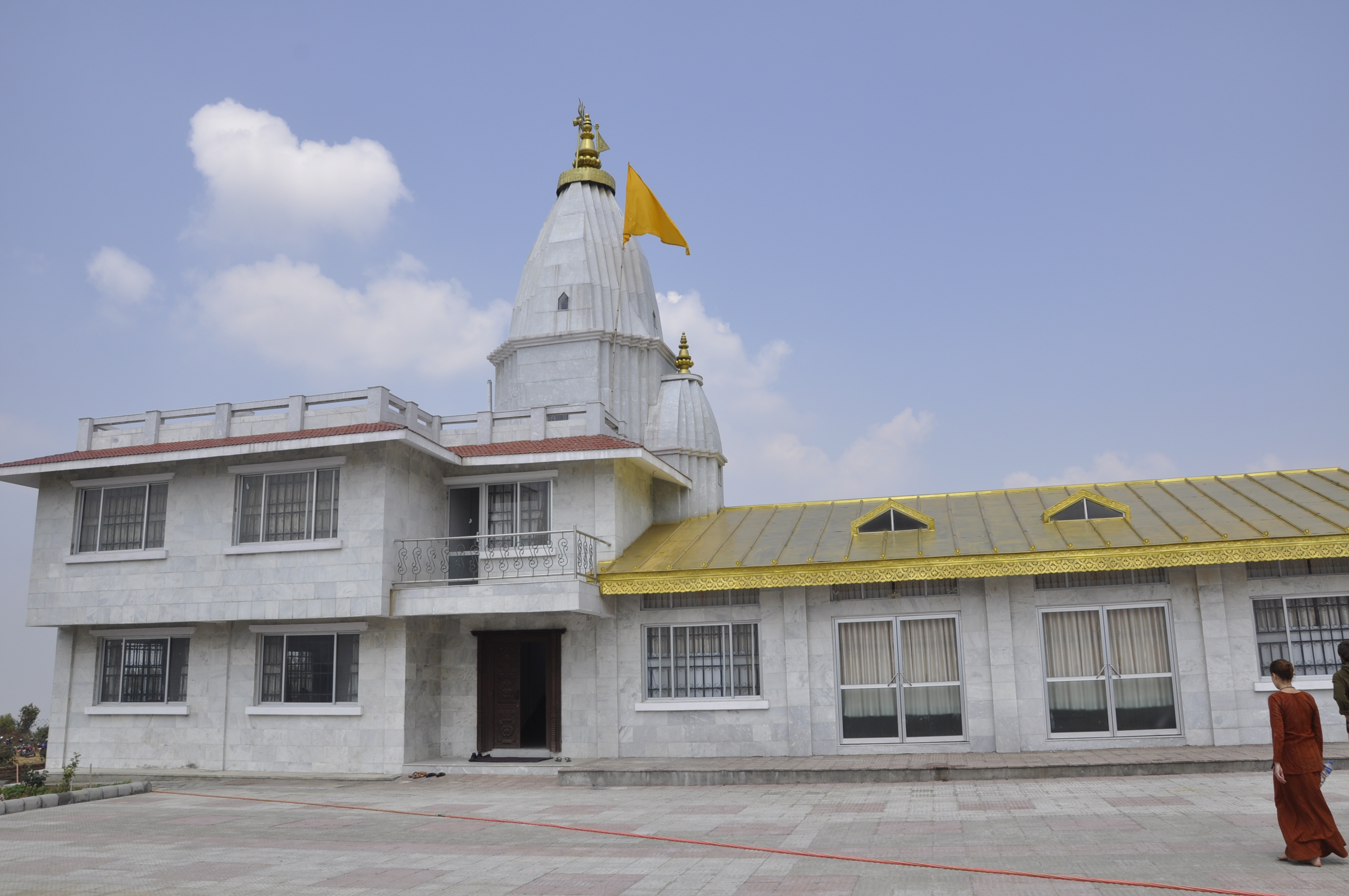
Pilot Baba Ashram, Gunduriya

== See also ==
- Zones of Nepal
- Patan Durbar Square
- Fortune Resort & Wellness Spa - Member ITC Hotels
- Kathmandu Durbar Square
