= Briddhi Lakshmi =

Nepalese Queen and Poet

- śrī śrī vṛddhi lakṣmī devī

Queen Consort of Bhaktapur
- Tenure: April 1722 – ?
- Predecessor: Vishva Lakshmi
- Successor: Position abolished

Queen regent of Thimi
- Tenure: April 1740 – 20 July 1740
- Predecessor: Position established
- Successor: Position abolished
- Born: c. 1704; Bettiah, Bettiah Raj, Mughal Empire (Present day Bihar, India)
- Died: after April 1754; Kingdom of Bhaktapur, Nepal (Present day Bagmati Province, Nepal)
- Spouse: Ranajit Malla (m. 1712)
- Issue: Vira Narasimha Malla (Devendra Malla)
- Dynasty: Malla (by marriage)
- Religion: Hinduism

Briddhi Lakshmi (Nepal Bhasa: 𑐰𑐺𑐡𑑂𑐢𑐶𑐮𑐎𑑂𑐲𑑂𑐩𑐷; née Rāya) was the queen consort of the Nepalese Kingdom of Bhaktapur (modern day Bhaktapur, Nepal) from 1722 as the first wife of Ranajit Malla and also a Newar language poet. For a brief period, she and her two-year-old son were the de jure monarch of an independent Thimi. She is today mostly remembered for the succession crisis of 1740 and the poems she wrote.

She was born in a noble family in from the region around Bettiah, in modern-day India and had a brother named Murāri Rāya. In 1712, she was brought to Nepal and then married to the nine year old Ranajit Malla. Later during the reign of Ranajita Malla found herself replaced by Jaya Lakshmi, a secondary wife of the king who had become the favorite of Ranajit Malla. By the time she gave birth to a son in August 1738, Jaya Lakshmi's eldest son, Ajitasimha Malla had already reached maturity. This caused a crisis of succession in Bhaktapur which ended with Briddhi Lakshmi first taking refuge in the town of Thimi and then later in Kathmandu.

She was a prolific poet and songwriter in the Newar language; her poem, "𑐎 𑐏 𑐫𑐵 𑐩𑑂𑐫𑐾" (ka kha yā mye), an abecedarian lyric, is considered one of the greatest works in the Newar language.

== Early life ==
On 30 November 1711, an envoy led by Bhairava Malla and Vira Joshi was dispatched by Bhupatindra Malla to Bettiah in order to fetch Briddhi Lakshmi to Bhaktapur. The expenditure book of their journey is so far the only source about Briddhi Lakshmi's early life. The expenditure book does not mention her name and refers to her as "kanyā", a term used for an unmarried girl. However, the book does mention her brother's name, Murāri Rāya. Bridhhi Laksmhi, as per the book was not of royal descent.

By 19 March 1712, the envoy had returned to Bhaktapur with Briddhi Lakshmi and her brother, Murāri Rāya, who had accompanied his sister but returned after they arrived safely in Bhaktapur. Briddhi Lakshmi was married to the crown prince Ranajit Malla eight months after her arrival, on the first day of kartika vadi 833 NS (14 November 1712).

== Succession crisis ==
=== Sources ===
Much of what is known about the crisis is known from the journal of Cassiano Beligatti, a Capuchin missionary from Macerata who was staying in Bhaktapur during the crisis of succession. There are also three copper plate inscriptions: two of them, at the temple of Brahmani in Bhaktapur attributed to Ranajita Malla, Briddhi Lakshmi and their child while the other two at the temple of Balkumari in Thimi and at Chitrapur Village, south of Thimi; dating from the same day from Briddhi Lakshmi. Additionally, there are several Newar Language poems written by Briddhi Lakshmi likely during her stay in Thimi or Kathmandu.

=== Background ===
The king had made every effort not to recognize as his legitimate son and heir to the kingdom, a boy born of a Queen; and the king did this at the instigation of his concubine, which she considered contrary to the statutes of the kingdom, wishing to make her own son succeed the king

— The Journal of Cassiano Beligatti

Ranajit Malla who ascended the throne after his father's death in May 1722 had many concubines and one particular concubine, Jaya Lakshmi became the favourite of the king. From Jaya Lakshmi, Ranajit Malla had a son, named Ajitasimha Malla, whose birth date is not known yet, but he must have been the king's eldest male child as he is addressed as the crown prince in a document from 1728. Additionally, Jaya Lakshmi was addressed as the rājapatni ("royal consort") in an epigraphy from 1733. Throughout this time, Briddhi Lakshmi appears to have been childless.

However, on 1 August 1738, Briddhi Lakshmi gave birth to a son in Thimi. Briddhi Lakshmi, being the king's only legitimate wife was favoured by the public and naturally Ranajit Malla was pressured by the public to change the crown prince to Briddhi Lakshmi's son. There is a copper plate at the Brahmani temple of Bhaktapur dating to NS 859 kartika krishna 1 (27 November 1739 CE) that mentions a donation of six Dapha to the panchayat of the city from Ranajita Malla, Briddhi Lakshmi and the Sahebaju. (Note: Sahebju, derived from the Arabic word for "master", is the title given to the heir apparent during the Malla Dynasty.)

It seems Jaya Lakshmi wanted to maintain the status quo by retaining her son's position as the crown prince and pressured the king to not change his previous decision. However, there was significant public pressure that compelled the king to recognize the son of Briddhi Lakshmi as the heir. (Note: "The people rose up against the King, and he had to satisfy them by solemnly recognizing his son as successor. Upon our arrival, the little King was two years old.")

However, Jaya Lakshmi having the support of the nobility as well as being a favourite of the monarch was able to excerise much power on the palace. In contrast, Bridhhi Lakshmi had no supporters among the nobility and courtiers of the palace, likely due to Jaya Lakshmi being from one of the noble families herself, except for a minister which Beligatti specified was from a "non-aristocratic family". In her poems, she describes being bullied and ridiculed in the palace by her rivals, for instance her poem "bhayirava taleju bihune varadāna" describe her situation as "I am being troubled like what a cow would feel united with a tiger". Beligatti also wrote in this journal that "the concubine had left no means untried to carry out her plan of destroying the little king"

=== Flight to Thimi ===
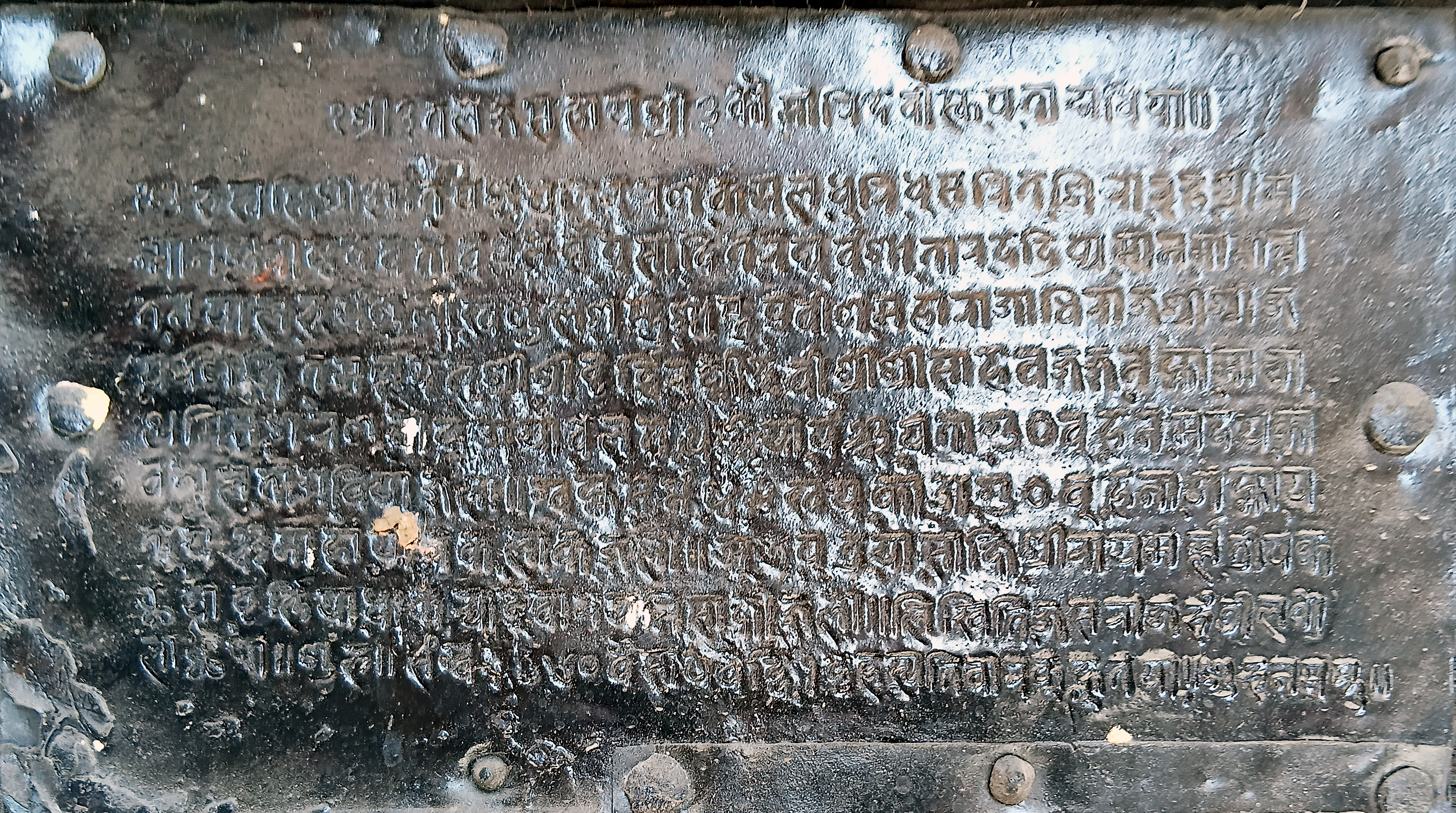
Briddhi Lakshmi's Newar language copper plate inscription at Balkumari temple, Thimi dated to 12 May 1740, mentions her taking refuge in the town.

Beligatti additionally wrote that Briddhi Lakshmi could not live in peace in the palace where her rival Jayalakshmi held all the power, and that she scented dangers ahead even for her child. Due to the public pressure regarding her safety, Ranajita Malla was compelled to appoint to a high-ranking office, which Beligatti calls Viceroy, a supporter of Briddhi Lakshmi who arranged the escape of the Queen and her infant son to Thimi in mid-April 1740.

Thimi being the second largest city in the kingdom, along with some smaller settlements around it like Nakadesh formed the appanage to the heir. Not long after her flight to Thimi, the people of Thimi, Nagesh and Nala declared her infant son as their king.

Ranajit Malla in order to solve this predicament called a general council for the people on 26 April 1740, whereby he would grant permission for anyone in the kingdom to enter his palace and were given permission to freely express their opinions directly to their king. Beligatti who was the witness of this event, wrote the following in his journal:

Due to this new turn of events, the King thought to convene a General Council on the quid agendum and summoned it for the evening of April 26th which, being in my opinion bizarre, I do not think it right to omit. About two hours after sunset, the King, together with the 4 principal Brahmins, and the Viceroy descended to one of the 12 courtyards of the king's mansion. All of them sat around a loggia and had all the torches removed so it was dark all around. Now, there were two gates that led from the square to the place where the King was with the aforesaid people, and having removed the guards at said gates allowed free entry to anyone who wished to enter and state their opinion. There were a great many of such people. All of them had their faces covered to hide their identity and spoke in an affected tone not to be recognized. Some scolded the king, even called him bad names; others threatened him with dire consequences and still a few more tendered what one would like to call a simple advice.

This went on until one hour after midnight had passed and those assembled then dispersed. The king deferred his judgment for the next day. Such night councils are not held except in similar cases, when the people are not satisfied with the King; and the King is hardly safe in his life, because these people are not bloodthirsty, principally toward their Kings, but when they are reduced to extremities they depose the King, and either confine him to an apartment of the court, or exile him from the Kingdom. What decision the King took after such a council, I never knew.

Many members of both factions came to us and broke our ears with their stories. Some wanted the Prefect to speak to the King, but the Prefect always refused, saying that we had not come here to support any party or take part in politics, but only to teach religion.

— Cassiano Beligatti, 1740

Briddhi Lakshmi set up a copper plate inscription in the Balkumari temple of Thimi as well as another in the village of Chitrapura, both dated to NS 860 vaisakha vadi 1 Thursday (12 May 1740) where she mentions her taking refuge in Thimi along with the Sahebju. Both the copper plates also grant a tax exemption to the panchayat of the respective towns for providing protection to the queen and her son.

This succession crisis spread to other kingdoms of Nepal as the king of Kathmandu Jaya Prakasa Malla seems to have supported the queen in her uprising which created a quagmire with Ranajita Malla and which eventually led to a minor war between them.

=== Escape to Kathmandu ===
On 20 July 1740, Briddhi Lakshmi had escaped Thimi for Kathmandu, with Beligatti writing, "the Queen of Bhaktapur who was in Thimi where the people had proclaimed her son king, on the pretext of bathing herself and her son in the river Bagmati to satisfy a vow she had made went there, but when she arrived at the river, instead of washing herself she ordered to those who were carrying her to speedily reach the borders of Kathmandu, and took refuge at the court where an apartment with guards was assigned to her by the king Jaya Prakasa. The action of the queen was much talked about in all the three kingdoms, even though she did that only in order to safeguard the life of the little king".

Her flight to Kathmandu seems to affected the people back in Bhaktapur, with Beligatti observing that the Saparu festival in Bhaktapur was called off early and was conducted "in a very melancholy way due to the evasion of the Queen and little King".

=== Aftermath ===
It's unclear what happened afterwards or when she returned to Bhaktapur after her flight to Kathmandu as no clear sources have been found.

The next source to mention her or her son is an edict from 6 March 1747 (NS 868 phalguna sukla 7) where her son, addressed as sri sri saheba juju, was being invited to the inauguration of a Buddhist monastery in Bhaktapur. Similarly, in an inscription from a communal shelter in Thimi dated to June 1751 (NS 872 jestha) identifies the kingdom as under the joint rule of Ranajita Malla and the Sahebaju.

According to an edict in Banepa, Briddhi Lakshmi commissioned a bridge in the town on 4 March 1751.

== Children ==
Before the birth of Devendra Malla on 1 August 1738 in Thimi, there are no other mentions of any children from Briddhi Lakshmi. The copper plate inscription she set up at the temple of Bramhani in Bhaktapur in November 1739, mentions his name as "Vira Narasimha Malla". Vira Narasimha Malla is also the name that appears in a stone inscription from 1752 (NS 873), where it states that he was co-ruling the kingdom with his father. Her Banepa inscription mentions her son's name as Devendra Malla. Similarly, Devendra Malla's name also appears as a donor of a drum to Taleju, the tutelary goddess of the Mallas, in 1754. Historian Dilli Raman Regmi were unsure whether Devendra Malla and Vira Narasimha Malla referred to the same person or were the names of two brothers. However other scholars like Munankarmi or Dhaubhadel suppose that Vira Narasimha and Devendra refer to the same person.

== Death ==
It is unclear how or when Briddhi Lakshmi and her son died. After their Banepa inscription, Briddhi Lakshmi and her son, Vira Narasimha's name appears as the donors of various ceremonial items in the temples of Bhaktapur 1750 and 1754. For instance, in 1751 (NS 872), they donated statuettes of various deities at a Buddhist temple in Bhaktapur. Finally, their last reference is from a ceremonial item they donated to the temple of Bhairava at Bhaktapur, and the inscription in it contains the date 9 April 1754 (NS 874 Chaitra vadi 2) and mention Briddhi Lakshmi and Devendra Malla as the donors. There are also ritual items donated by the mother-son on the same day in the temple of Varahi in Bhaktapur. These are the last available reference for Briddhi Lakshmi. Her son, Devendra Malla appears as a sole donor of a ritual drum to Taleju in Bhaktapur Durbar Square dated to NS 874 on a full moon day; the month having been erased, thus falling between October 1753 and October 1754.

As regards her son, in the local folklore, Vira Narasimha Malla was assassinated. The 19th century chronicles of Nepal mention that Vira Narasimha died as a result of "dark magic". The earliest of the chronicles, the Padmagiri (1825) mentions that the dark magic was performed by the "concubine" of Ranajita Malla, while later chronicles, such as the Wright Chronicle make the half-brothers of the prince as the perfomers of the dark magic. The Padmagiri chronicle dated to 1825 mentions the following regarding his death:

This Rajah (Ranajit Malla) while performing the Koṭyāhuti sacrifice could not feel the alter, upon which he was advised to offer a human sacrifice. One of his concubines being informed of this bribed the prohit or priest, who having made an image of the Rajah's real son performed the requisite rites. No sooner had the prohit the image to the flames than the Rajah's son and heir Vira Narasimha died, upon which the Rajah delivered his country into the hands of the Gorkhias, and having taken his family goddess Tulja, went to Benares where he died after some time.

— Padmagiri Chronicle

When the Gorkhali forces invaded Bhaktapur in November 1769, it appears neither Briddhi Lakshmi nor her son were alive. The memoir of a servant of Ranajit Malla during the battle, mention that his three concubines (Newar: mathayāḥ) were his only wives left alive. Similarly, the memoir also does not mention Vira Narasimha or Devendra Malla, which suggests that her son had died by then too. Therefore, her (and her son's) death must have happened after March 1754 but before 1769.

== Literary works ==
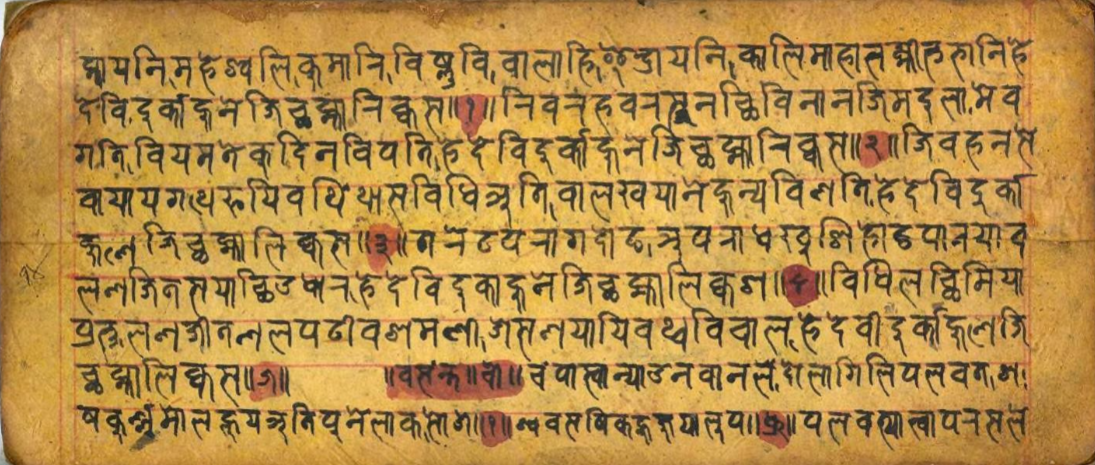
A page from a songbook in the Asa Safu Kuthi containing one of her poems.

While some of her poems are preserved in Dapha songbooks, the 52-folio manuscript titled "gīta saṃgraha" at the National Archives of Nepal under catalogue number B 285/12 is the only surviving collection of her poetry. Similarly, in the national archives, under the catalogue number B 387/24, is also a manuscript containing hymns written by Briddhi Lakshmi titled "bhairava stavaka". Her poems from the "gīta saṃgraha" are laments describing her experience during the crisis of succession and her subsequent flight to Thimi and Kathmandu. However, only two of her works from the book, ka kha yā mye and bhayirava taleju bihune varadāna have been published so far; by Janak Lal Vaidya in 2000.

Out of the two that have been published, Premshanti Tuladhar, a professor of Newar, particularly has praised her ka kha yā mye (Nepal Bhasa: 𑐎 𑐏 𑐫𑐵 𑐩𑑂𑐫𑐾, lit. 'a song of ka and kha'), an abecedarian poem based on the Newar alphabet. Similarly, Historian Om Prasad Dhaubhadel describes it as "touching, sensitive and important". Following are the starting verses of the poem in the original Classical Newar and its transliteration:

𑐎𑐮𑐶𑐳 𑐖𑐣𑐩 𑐡𑐫𑐶𑐰𑐣 𑐧𑐶𑐮 𑐕𑐵𑐫
(kalisa janama dayivana bila chāya)
𑐏𑐕𑐶𑐫𑐵 𑐧𑐕𑐶𑐫𑐵 𑐬𑐳 𑐩𑐡𑐸 𑐳𑐸𑐏 𑐫𑐵𑐫
(khachiyā bachiyā rasa madu sukha yāya)
𑐐𑐬𑐸𑐜 𑐐𑐌𑐩𑑂𑐴𑐳𑐾𑐣 𑐩𑐫𑐵𑐟 𑐰𑐶𑐰𑐾𑐎
(garuḍa gomhasena mayāta viveka)

— Briddhi Lakshmi, ka kha yā mye,

Following is the translation of the verses:

In Kali, why was I given birth by the gods,
Not even for a moment, for half a moment, there is rasa nor joy
The one who sits atop the Garuda (Note: either Vishnu or her husband the king) has shown no discernment.

— Translation

Similarly, her other poem that has been published, named bhayirava taleju bihune varadāna (Nepal Bhasa: 𑐨𑐫𑐶𑐬𑐧 𑐟𑐮𑐾𑐖𑐸 𑐧𑐶𑐴𑐸𑐣𑐾 𑐧𑐬𑐡𑐵𑐣, "bhairava taleju, give me a boon") after the starting verse, has been equally praised by Dhaubhadel. Following are the starting verses of the poem in the original Classical Newar and its transliteration:

𑐨𑐫𑐶𑐬𑐧 𑐟𑐮𑐾𑐖𑐸 𑐧𑐶𑐴𑐸𑐣𑐾 𑐧𑐬𑐡𑐵𑐣
(bhayirava taleju bihune varadāna)
𑐠𑐩 𑐥𑐶𑐫𑐵 𑐳𑐶𑐩𑐵 𑐳𑐶𑐳𑐾, 𑐮𑐏𑐫𑐵 𑐁𑐢𑐵𑐬 𑐧𑐶𑐳𑐾, 𑐣𑐶𑐡𑐵𑐣𑐣 𑐮𑐴𑐶𑐫 𑐖𑐶 𑐩𑐵𑐮
(thama piyā simā sise, lakhayā ādhāra bise, nidānana lahiya ji māla)
𑐧𑐵𑐮𑐎𑐫 𑐩𑐾𑐰 𑐐𑐟𑐶 𑐩𑐡𑐸, 𑐥𑐟𑐶 𑐳𑐶𑐳𑐾 𑐨𑐐𑐰𑐟𑐶, 𑐎𑐬𑐸𑐞𑐵𑐣 𑐫𑐵𑐰 𑐖𑐶 𑐰𑐶𑐔𑐵𑐮
(bālakaya meva gati madu, pati sise bhagavati, karuṇāna yāva ji vicāla)

— Briddhi Lakshmi, bhayirava taleju bihune varadāna,

Following is the translation of the verses:

Oh Bhairava, Oh Taleju, grant me a blessing
One's own beloved tree, that one has given the support of water, it is one's necessity to nurture it
This child has no other salvation, knowing this Bhagavati, you must take care of me with compassion.

— Translation

Historian Janak Lal Vaidya describes Briddhi Lakshmi as an important poet of the 18th century and praises her poem for its sweetness and musicality.

== In culture ==
On 27 November 2023, a Nepal Bhasa song written by Durga Lal Shrestha was released, the subject of which was the relationship between Ranajit Malla and Bridhhi Lakshmi before they were married but after her arrival in Bhaktapur from Bettiah. For the music video, Ranajit Malla was played by Karma Shakya and Briddhi Lakshmi was played by Rojina Suwal.

== Gallery ==
Following are the manuscript folios containing her poem, ka kha yā mye and bhayirava taleju bihune varadān:

First page of ka kha yā mye

Second page of ka kha yā mye

Third page of ka kha yā mye

Fourth page of ka kha yā mye

Fifth page of ka kha yā mye

Final page of ka kha yā mye, taleju bhairava begins from Line 3.

Second page of taleju bhairava

Final page of taleju bhairava
