= Ranajit Malla =

Last king of Bhaktapur

- King of Bhaktapur
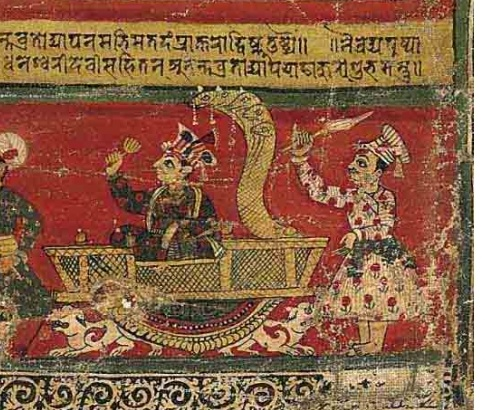
- Ranajit Malla on his serpent throne, c.1722

King of Bhaktapur
- Reign: 15 April 1722– 11 November 1769
- Coronation: 15 April 1722
- Predecessor: Bhupatindra Malla
- Successor: Position abolished

King of Lalitpur (Patan)
- Reign: 1761—1763
- Predecessor: Jaya Prakash Malla
- Successor: Dal Mardan Shah
- Born: 18 November 1702; Bhaktapur, Nepal (Present Day Bagmati Province, Nepal)
- Died: 23 May 1771 (aged 68); Manikarnika Ghat, Varanasi, Oudh State (Present day Uttar Pradesh, India)
- Spouses: Briddhi Lakshmi (m. 1712): Jaya Laksmi
- Issue: Vira Narasimha Malla (or Devendra Malla); Ajjitasimha Malla; Achyutasimha Malla; Abadhutish Malla; Dhanasimha Malla; and others
Regnal name
- Sri Sri Jaya Ranajit Malla Deva
- Dynasty: Malla
- Father: Bhupatindra Malla
- Mother: Vishva Lakshmi

Ranajita Malla (Newar: 𑐬𑐞𑐖𑐶𑐟 𑐩𑐮𑑂𑐮) was the last king of the Malla dynasty who ruled Bhaktapur from 1722 to 1769. He is widely known for his contribution to Newari and Maithili literature, in particular his plays are generally praised by modern scholars. He has been generally described as a peace loving, simple and pious monarch who allowed his citizens to advise and criticize him. However, his reign was characterized by constant disputes with Kantipur and Gorkha. He is also known for the crisis of succession during his reign when he favored his concubine's issue over his queen consort's, who was more generally liked, which caused a lot of mutiny in the kingdom especially in cities like Thimi and Banepa.

Ranajit Malla was described very positively by Capuchin missionaries, particularly due to his friendly attitude towards them and he allowed them to preach Christianity without persecution. During the later parts of his reign, he ruled Lalitpur briefly, after being invited by the city's nobles. He was also, during his later years, generally respected by people in the valley due to him being of old age and the only direct descendant of Yaksha Malla.

After his defeat by the Gorkhali forces of Prithivi Narayan Shah in 1769, he was per his choice sent into exile in Varanasi, and on its way composed a Newar language Dapha song from the hills of Chandragiri, which is regarded as an important literary work of the Newar Language.

== Early life ==
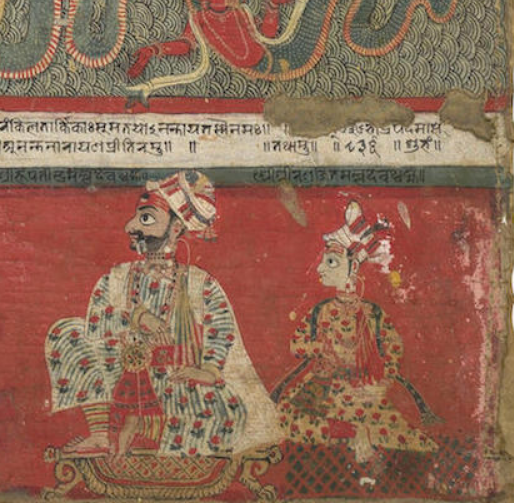
Ranajit Malla at 9, with his father Bhupatindra Malla. Miniature from a Paubha dated 1712.

Ranajit Malla was born to Vishva Lakshmi and Bhupatindra Malla on 18 November 1702. Similarly, his annaprashana ceremony (Newar: macā janko) was held on 27 August 1703 in the town of Thimi.

== Physical contributions ==
Ranajit Malla like many other Malla Kings of Bhaktapur contributed in beautifying Bhaktapur by building many heritages. As Ranajit Malla reign was in a politically unstable period, his contributions are few compared to his forefathers.

=== Lūn Dhwākhā ===
Known among tourists as the Golden gate, Lūn Dhwākhā (Nepal bhasa: 𑐮𑐸𑑃 𑐢𑑂𑐰𑐵𑐏𑐵) is the entrance to the Mulā Chwōkā containing the shrine of Taleju. As per the gilt copper inscription on the gate, it was installed on the year 874 of the Nepalese era(= 1753 CE) by King Ranajit Malla and his Queen Jaya Lakshmi Malla. Although it is said that a golden gate on the entrance to the shrine of Taleju was originally planned to be built four generations before Ranajit by King Naresha Malla but none of the kings before him could build it due to the lack of gold. Ranajit however used the profits that he gained from trading with the Tibetans on building the golden gate.

=== The bell of Taleju ===
Right in the front of the Golden gate on a tall platform is a giant bell that is played while doing the Puja of Taleju. This kind of bell is present on the Durbar Square of both Patan and Kathmandu. Locally known as Tagoun Gān (𑐟𑐐𑑂𑐰𑑃𑑅 𑐐𑐵𑑄 lit. 'Big bell' ), its sound was once said to be heard anywhere in the town. This bell was installed by Ranajit Malla on 6 January 1737 CE.

=== Sāfukuthi ===
Sāfukuthi (Nepal Bhasa: 𑐳𑐦𑐸𑐎𑐸𑐠𑐶 lit. 'Library') also sometimes referred as Sākothā was said to be a big library presently located at Sākothā tole in Bhaktapur. Ranajit Malla is said to have loved collecting old and antique things which were kept in the Sāfukuthi along with various books relating to religion, science and medicine. Most of the books and manuscript present in the library were destroyed by fire during the Battle of Bhaktapur and the building itself was completely destroyed during the earthquake of 1833 and 2015.

== Literary contribution ==
Among all the kings of Bhaktapur, Ranajit Malla is considered a pioneer in Nepal bhasa literature. Most of the songs in old songbooks of Bhaktapur bear his signature. He himself was a prolific singer himself and was said to have spent more time reciting poems and songs than the politics of the kingdom. Besides songs, he also wrote various plays like Indrābijaya, Ushāharan, Krishnacharitra. He also authored many books like Rukmaniharan, Pshatdarshana etc. Most of his works were written in the Newari script in a Newari-cum-Sanskrit language.

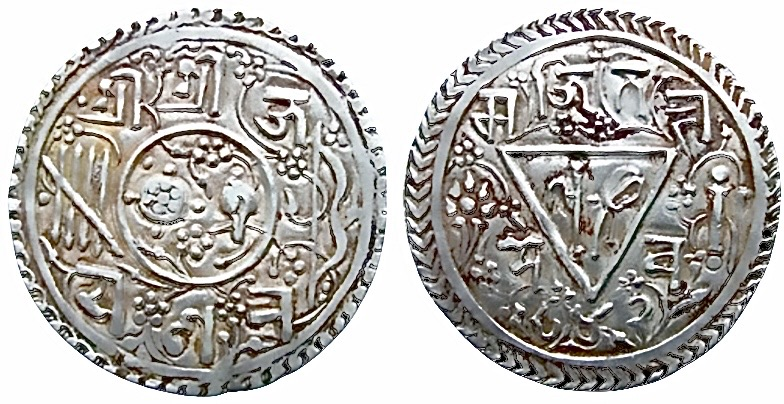
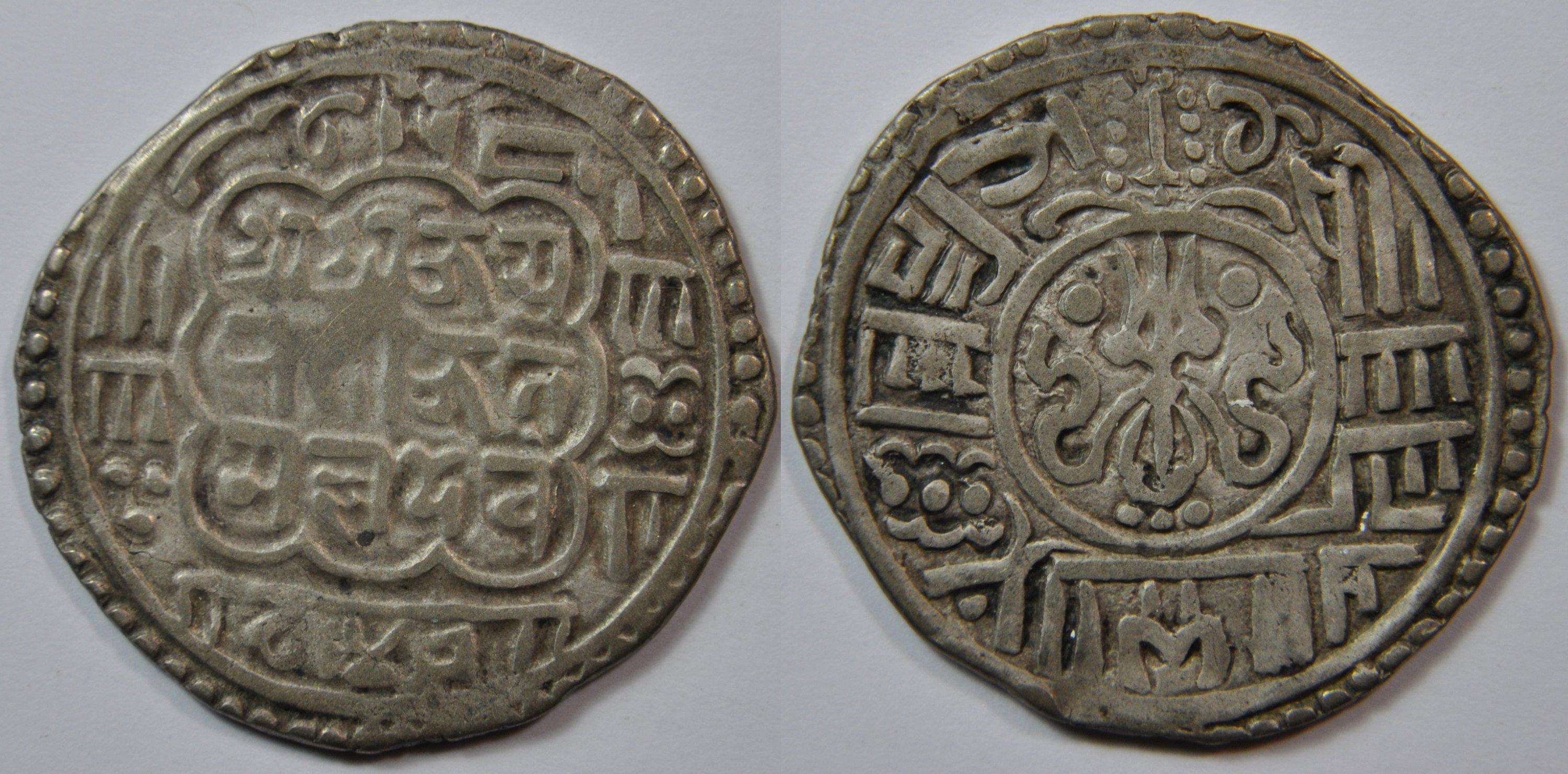
Mohar silver coins of King Ranajit Malla with coin legends in the Newar script, struck in Nepal Sambat 842 (= 1722 CE).

Many of Ranajit Malla's creations are devotional Dāphā and Rāga songs. His works still quite popular among the singers of Bhaktapur. One of his most popular work is a Newari song he wrote for the annual Biska Jatra titled 'Thō thēn jāgū rasan'. This song written in the seasonal Pahan Charhe tune is still sung as a seasonal song during Biska Jatra in Bhaktapur. Hé Síva Bhairava is another song sung before the chariot procession of Biska Jatra and is also written by Ranajit Malla in the Bhairava Rāga.

As Ranajit Malla aged, his interest in singing started to increase. By the time of the Battle of Bhaktapur, the old Ranajit had almost given up on politics and spent most of his time on singing devotional songs. As he was singing hymns and ragas while waiting for Yama to take him, Bhaktapur was mostly in the hands of his sons who were supportive of the Gorkha King. The invading king took advantage of Ranajit's political weakness and bribed his illegitimate sons who secretly helped the invaders during the Battle and even opened the city gates of Bhaktapur during the Battle to allow the invaders in the city.

After being defeated in the Battle of Bhaktapur by the Gorkhalis, Ranajit Malla was sent to Kashi under his own choice by the Gorkhali King. Deeply saddened by having to leave his kingdom, he composed a Rāga song, expressing his sorrows in the hills of Chandragiri where he looked at his kingdom for the last time before leaving for Kashi. He is said to have recited this song while crying uncontrollably. The first lines of the song appear below.

Nepal Bhasa

1. 𑐴𑐵𑐫 𑐴𑐵𑐫 𑐬𑐵𑐩 𑐬𑐵𑐩 𑐐𑐠𑐾 𑐩𑐮𑐸𑐩 𑐣𑐾𑐥𑐵𑐮
2. 𑐱𑐟𑑂𑐬𑐸 𑐡𑐸𑐬𑑂𑐖𑐣𑐣𑑄 𑐦𑐸𑐚𑐎𑐵𑐮𑐫𑑀 𑐁𑐰
3. 𑐗𑐶𑐣𑐶𑐡𑑀𑐮 𑐬𑐵𑐖𑑂𑐫𑐳𑑄 𑐩𑐡𑐟𑐫𑑀 𑐖𑐶𑐟 𑐰𑐵𑐳
4. 𑐰𑐶𑐡𑐾𑐱𑐫𑐵 𑐰𑐵𑐳 𑐖𑐸𑐮 𑐠𑐣𑐶 𑐁𑐰 𑐬𑐵𑐩 𑐬𑐵𑐩
5. 𑐴𑑂𑐣𑐾𑐠𑐸 𑐖𑐣𑑂𑐩𑐫𑐵 𑐥𑐵𑐥𑑄 𑐩𑐣𑐾𑐣𑐵𑐐𑐸 𑐳𑑂𑐰𑐫 𑐢𑐸𑐣𑑄
6. 𑐥𑐘𑑂𑐖𑐮𑐳 𑐔𑑂𑐰𑐣𑐵𑐴𑑂𑐩𑐡𑐸𑐠𑐾𑑄 𑐖𑐶 𑐣𑑀𑐣 𑐬𑐵𑐩 𑐬𑐵𑐩
7. 𑐣𑐰𑐡𑐸𑐬𑑂𑐐𑐵 𑐐𑐞𑐾𑐱𑐫𑐵𑐎𑐾 𑐳𑐴𑐳𑑂𑐬 𑐖𑐶𑑄 𑐰𑐶𑐣𑐟𑐶 𑐫𑐵𑐣𑐵
8. 𑐮𑐵𑐳𑐮𑐵𑐥𑐶 𑐀𑐥𑐬𑐵𑐢 𑐎𑑂𑐲𑐾𑐩𑐵 𑐫𑐵𑐴𑐸 𑐬𑐵𑐩 𑐬𑐵𑐩
9. 𑐮𑑂𑐴𑐵𑐫 𑐐𑑀𑐴𑑂𑐩𑐫𑐵𑐎𑐾 𑐖𑐶𑐣 𑐡𑐸𑑅𑐏𑐫𑐵 𑐰𑐾𑐡𑐣𑐵
10. 𑐠𑐸𑐐𑐸 𑐥𑐵𑐳 𑐦𑐾𑐣𑐶𑐌 𑐳𑐸𑐣𑐵𑐣𑑄 𑐬𑐵𑐩 𑐬𑐵𑐩
11. 𑐥𑐶𑐬𑐟𑐶 𑐫𑐵𑐣𑐵𑐰 𑐔𑑀𑐣𑐵 𑐕𑐮 𑐫𑐵𑐟 𑐡𑐸𑐬𑑂𑐖𑐣𑐣𑑄
12. 𑐴𑐵𑐫 𑐴𑐵𑐫 𑐕𑐸 𑐣𑐸𑐐𑐮 𑐖𑐸𑐮 𑐬𑐵𑐩 𑐬𑐵𑐩
13. 𑐳𑐸𑐬𑑂𑐫𑐰𑑄𑐱𑐷 𑐎𑐸𑐮𑐩𑐞𑐷 𑐱𑑂𑐬𑐷 𑐬𑐞𑐖𑐷𑐟 𑐩𑐮𑑂𑐮
14. 𑐟𑐮𑐾𑐖𑐹𑐣𑑄 𑐧𑐶𑐮 𑐰𑐿𑐎𑐸𑐞𑑂𑐛 𑐰𑐵𑐳 𑐬𑐵𑐩 𑐬𑐵𑐩

Nepal Bhasa (Romanized)

1. hāya hāya rāma rāma gathe maluma nepāla
2. śatru durjananaṃ phuṭakālayo āva
3. jhinidola rājyasaṃ madatayo jita vāsa
4. videśayā vāsa jula thani āva rāma rāma
5. nhethu janmayā pāpaṃ manenāgu svaya dhunaṃ
6. pañjalasa cvanāmhadutheṃ ji nona rāma rāma
7. navadurgā gaṇeśayāke sahasra jiṃ vinati yānā
8. lāsalāpi aparādha kṣemā yāhu rāma rāma
9. lhāya gohmayāke jina dukhayā vedanā
10. thugu pāsa phenio sunānaṃ rāma rāma
11. pirati yānāva conā chala yāta durjananaṃ
12. hāya hāya chu nugala jula rāma rāma
13. suryavaṃśī kulamaṇī śrī raṇajīta malla
14. talejūnaṃ bila vaikuṇṭha vāsa rāma rāma

Translation

1. Oh Ram! Oh Ram! How could I survive without remembering Nepal?
2. The evil enemy destroyed me now
3. [There is] no more shelter [for me] in the country of twelve thousand [households]!
4. A foreign land has become my abode now on! Oh Ram! Oh Ram!!
5. As the fruit of the sin that I committed in my previous life, I have already seen what I have not even heard of!
6. There is no point of living in a cage! Oh Ram! Oh Ram!!
7. I pray million times to Goddess Nava-Durga and God Ganesa!
8. For a pardon over the crimes I committed! Oh Ram! Oh Ram!!
9. To how many people the grief of pain I express?
10. No one can make me free from this anguish! Oh Ram! Oh Ram!!
11. Kept on showing affection, the evil [conspirator] deceived [me]!
12. Alas! Alas! What sort of thinking [of mine] caused this? Oh Ram!
13. [To] this Ranajit Malla, the jewel of the Solar Dynasty,
14. A shelter in heaven is offered by Goddess Taleju! Oh Ram! Oh Ram!!

Ranajit Malla has 30 dramas credited to his name and was a prolific writer like his father Bhupatindramalla. So far, only one of these dramas has been published and was written in the Maithili language. This was titled the Mādhavānala-Kāmakandalā-nātaka.

== Marriage and Children ==
Ranajit Malla had along with his queen, Briddhi Lakshmi, five other concubines, Jaya Lakshmi, Riddhi Lakshmi, Buddhi Lakshmi and Manamaiju. Among them, Jaya Lakshmi was his favourite as her name appears in many of his songs and inscriptions. Jaya Lakshmi is also mentioned as his wife in the gold plate inscription on the Golden Gate of the royal palace that he consecrated.

From his legitimate queen, Briddhi Lakshmi, he had a son named Vira Narasimha Malla, who was also known as Devendra Malla. From his concubines he had seven children and gave each of them a house to live outside of the palace. His eight children were:

- Vira Narasimha Malla

He was born from Briddhi Lakshmi in Thimi on July 1738. He was also the heir apparent of the kingdom until his assassination.

- Ajitasingha Malla

Born from Jaya Lakshmi, he was the eldest of Ranajit Malla's children and before the birth of Vira Narasimha in 1738, was the heir presumptive of the kingdom.

- Manothara Singha Malla
- Abadhuta Singha Malla
- Achyuta Singha Malla
- Dhana Singha Malla
- Lakshmi Narasingha Malla
- Jaya Narayana Malla

== Relations with other kingdoms ==
Ranajit Malla's reign was the most politically messy period in Bhaktapur. The internal conflict among his sons and his queens weakened Bhaktapur form the inside. On top of that Bhaktapur was frequently attacked by both Kantipur and Yela. In order to get military strengthen Bhaktapur Ranajit hoped an alliance with the Kingdom of Gorkha by allowing the Gorkha Prince Prithvi Narayan Shah, who had been rejected by Jaya Prakash Malla of Kantipur, to study in Bhaktapur and also established a Miteri relation between his eldest son Birnarasimha Malla and the Gorkha Prince. Prithivi Narayan Shah, seeing the prosperity of the Malla kingdoms developed an ambition to conquer the kingdoms and become the king of these prosperous kingdoms.

== Battle of Bhaktapur ==
When both Kantipur and Yela fell to the Gorkha kingdom, the kings of both these kingdoms came to Bhaktapur seeking refuge.

== Gallery ==
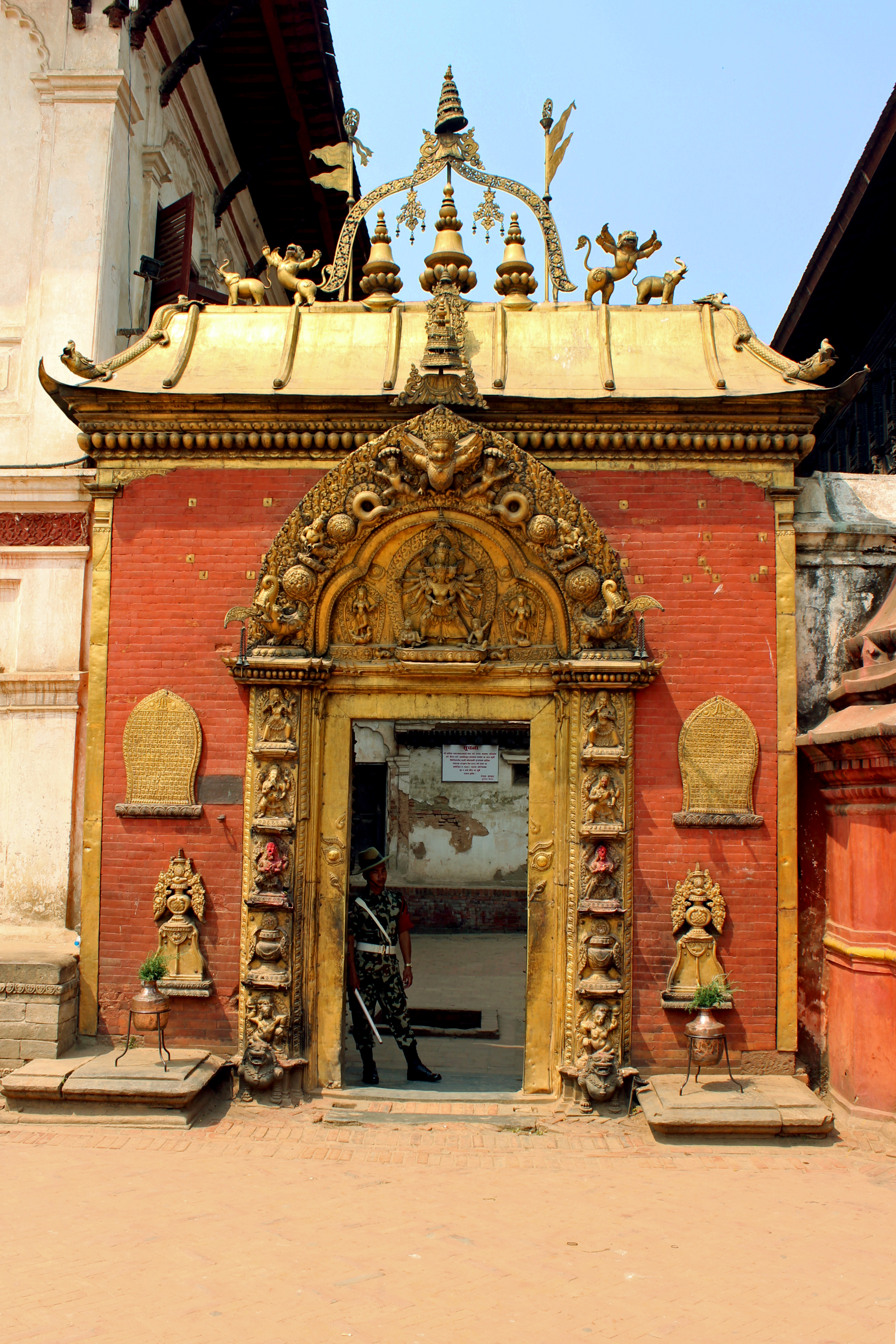
The Golden gate as the entrance to the former palace of Bhaktapur.

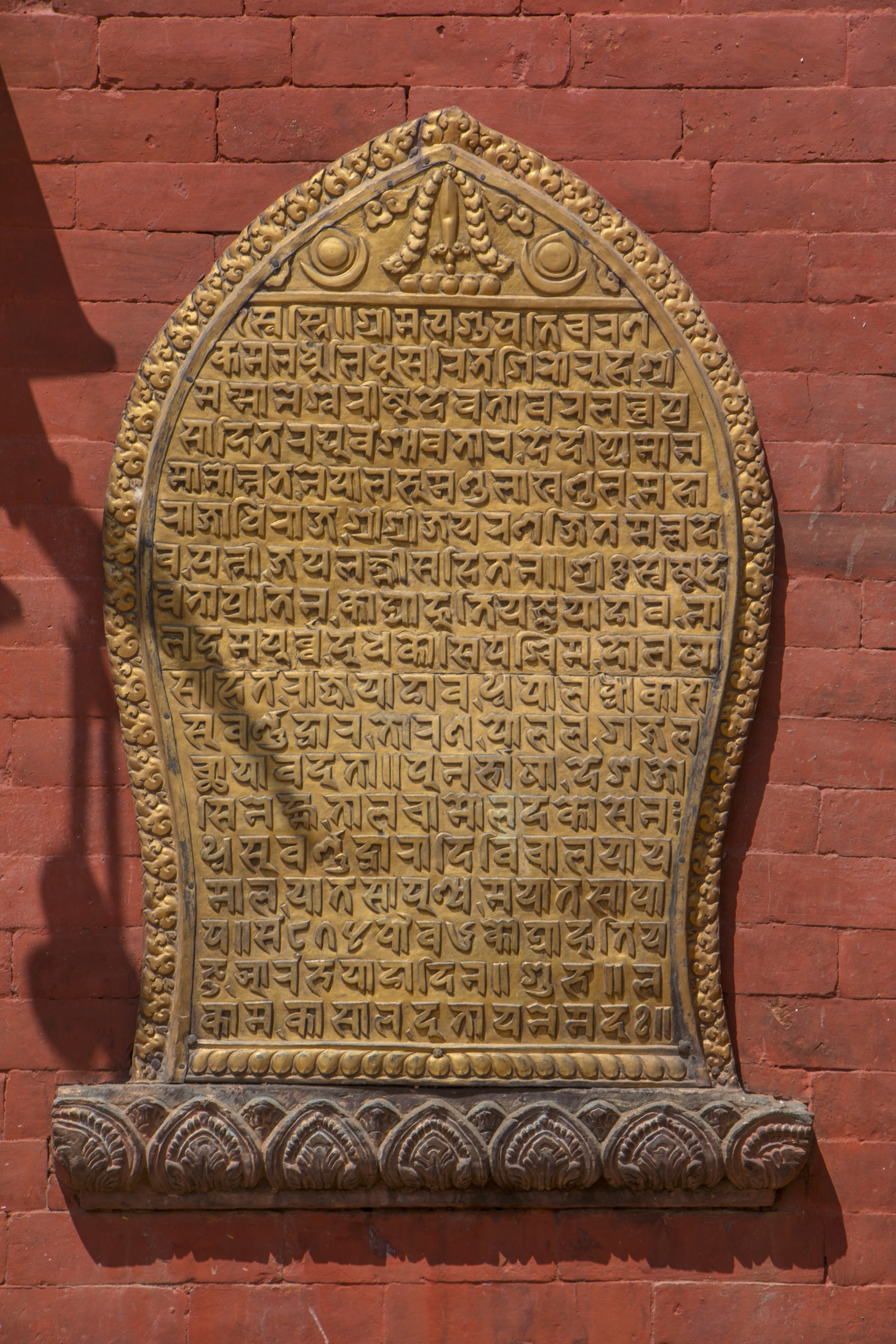
Inscription of Ranajit Malla on the Golden gate, Newar language, 1753 CE.

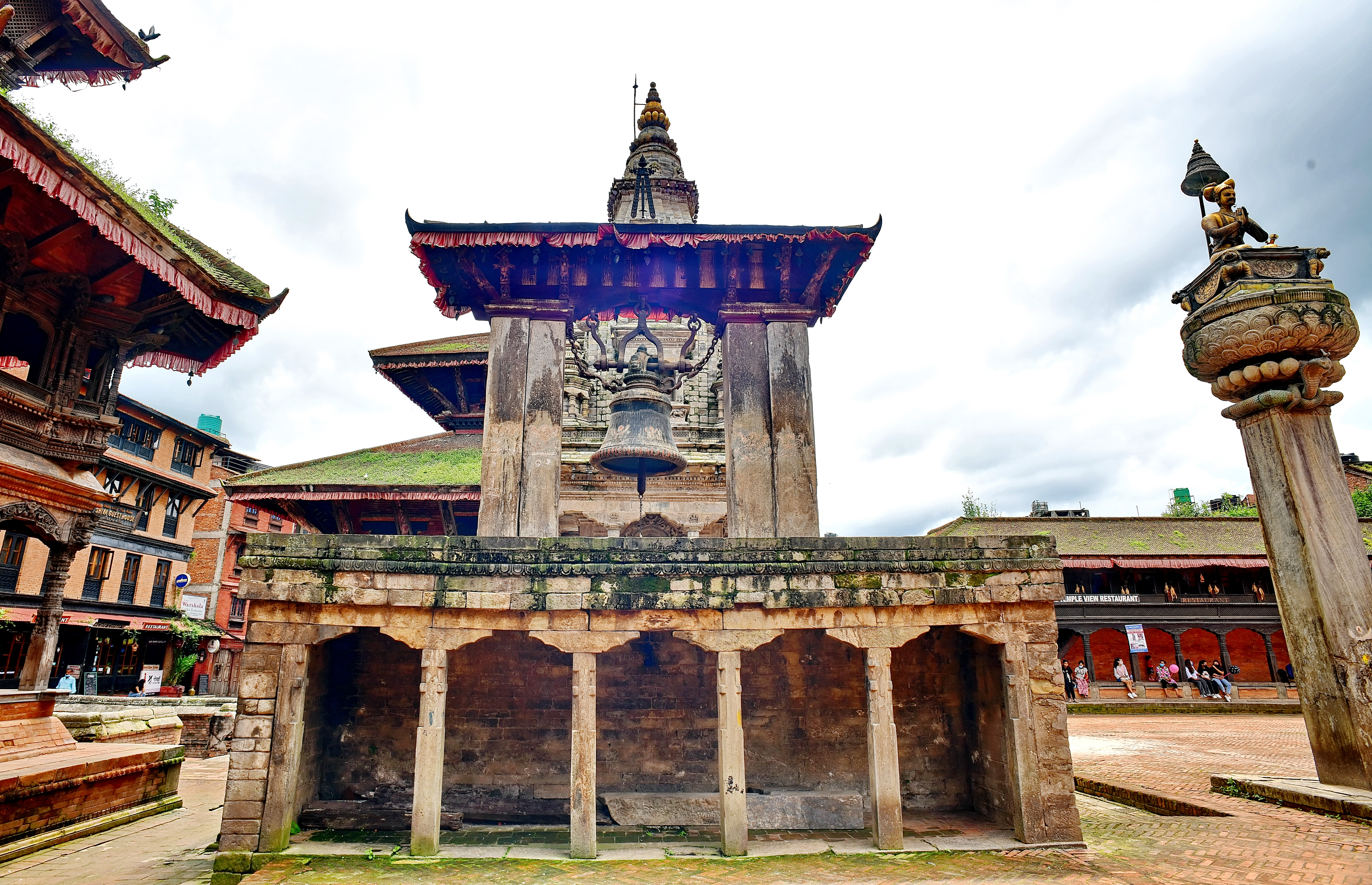
The Taleju bell of Bhaktapur

== See also ==
- Battle of Bhaktapur
