= Siddhikali Temple =

Hindu temple in Nepal

Siddhikali Temple सिद्धिकाली मन्दीर
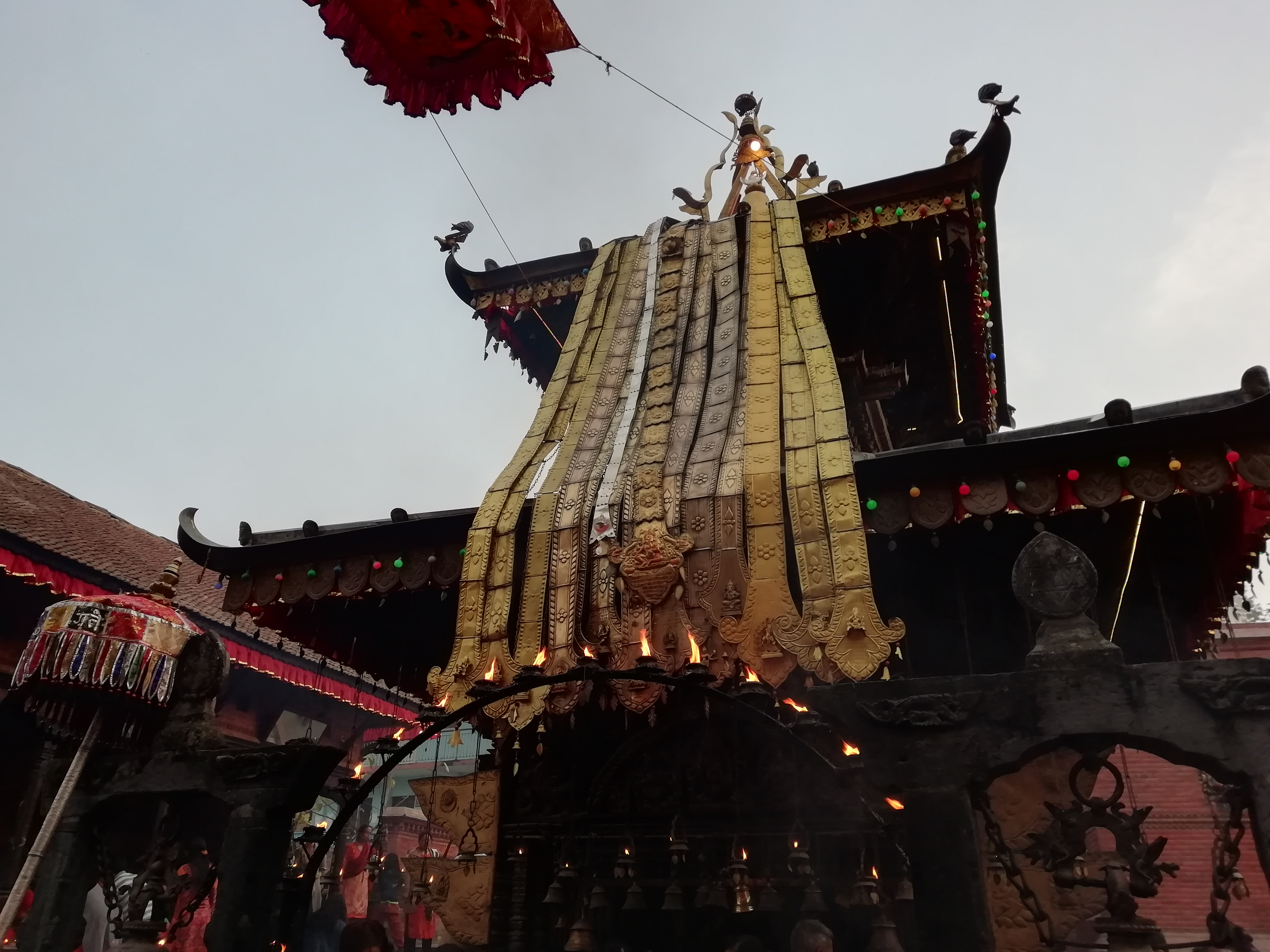

Religion
- Affiliation: Hinduism
- District: Bhaktapur District

Location
- Location: Thimi
- Country: Nepal

Siddhikali Temple is a Hindu temple located in Thimi, Bhaktapur District, Nepal.

The two-storey pagoda-style temple is dedicated to Kali, Shiva and Ganesha. It is believed to be a Shakta pitha formed from the fallen right eye of Sati. The temple is located in Inayekwo in the north-west of Thimi.

The temple is also known as Inayekwo Dyo in the Newar language and is associated with Chamunda one of the goddesses of Ashta Matrika. The structure has gold-plated roofs and a gilded gajur (top pinnacle).

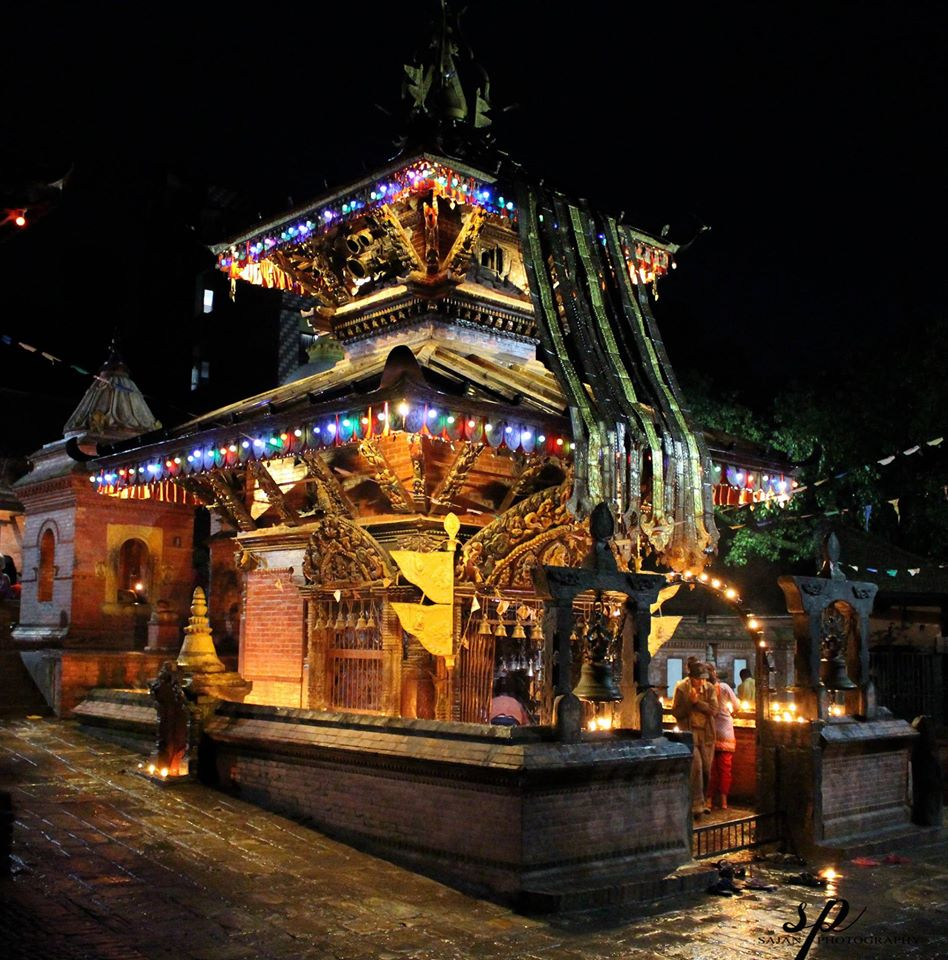
Siddhikali Temple at night

== Description ==
The Siddhikali Temple is an important cultural and religious site. Inside the temple idols of Siddhikali and Ganesha are placed in the central shrine while Bhairava and Navadurga are also worshipped.

The temple complex includes traditional rest houses (satah) falcha (inns), smaller shrines, and several stone water taps (hiti). Many of these taps still provide continuous natural water.

A small river (khuchaa) flows near the temple and nearby shrines include Bhimsen Temple and Gopaleshwor Mahadev Temple.

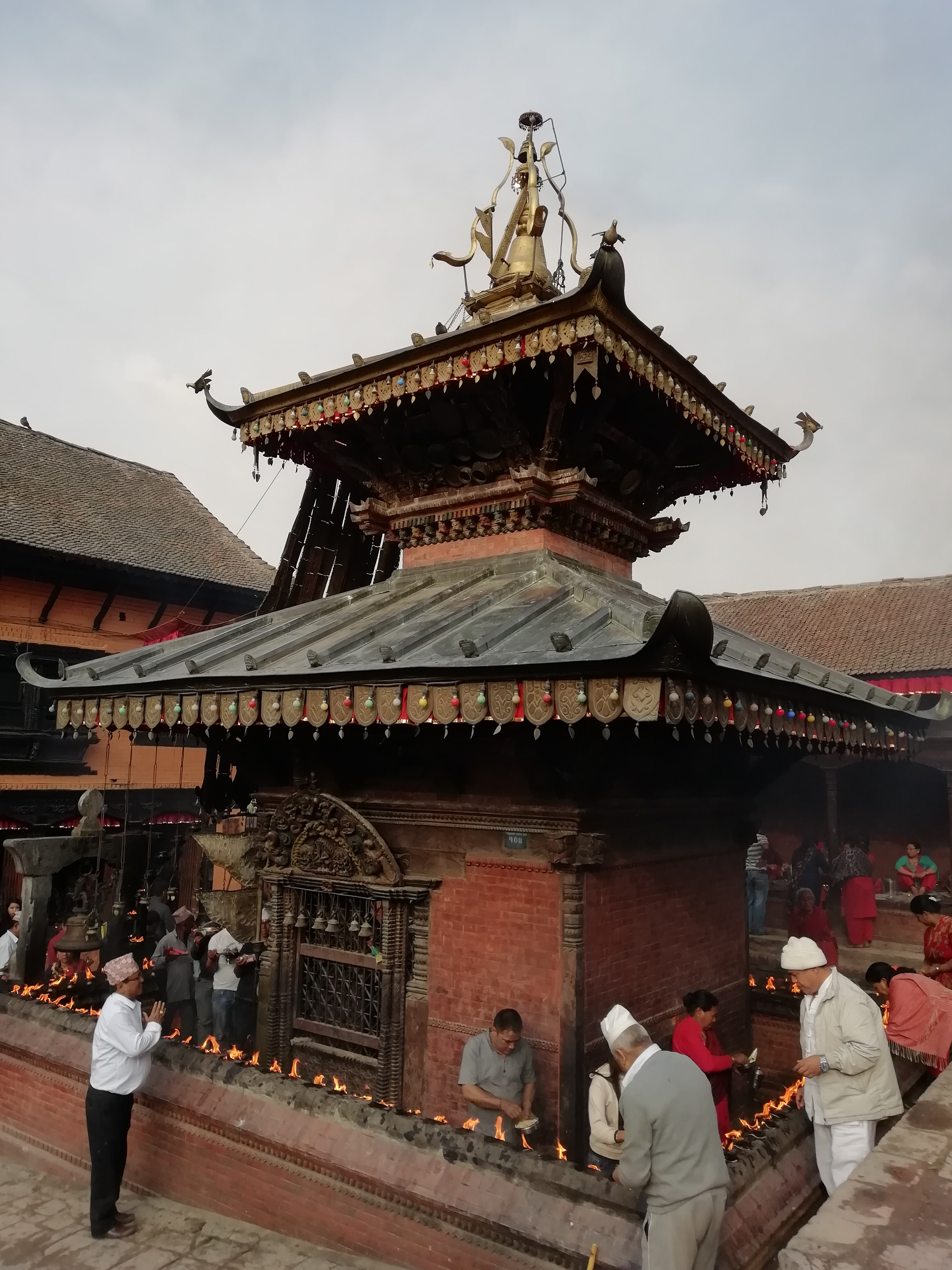
Siddhikali Temple, Madhyapur Thimi

== Festivals ==
Major festivals celebrated at Siddhikali Temple include Bisket Jatra, Dashain, Vasant Panchami, Maha Shivaratri and Holi.

Siddhikali Jatra is celebrated twice a year, in Baisakh and Bhadra months with processions, palanquins and traditional music.

== See also ==
- List of Hindu temples in Nepal
