= Balkumari temple, Bhaktapur =

Temple in Bakhtapur, Nepal

Balkumari Temple
- बालकुमारी मन्दिर
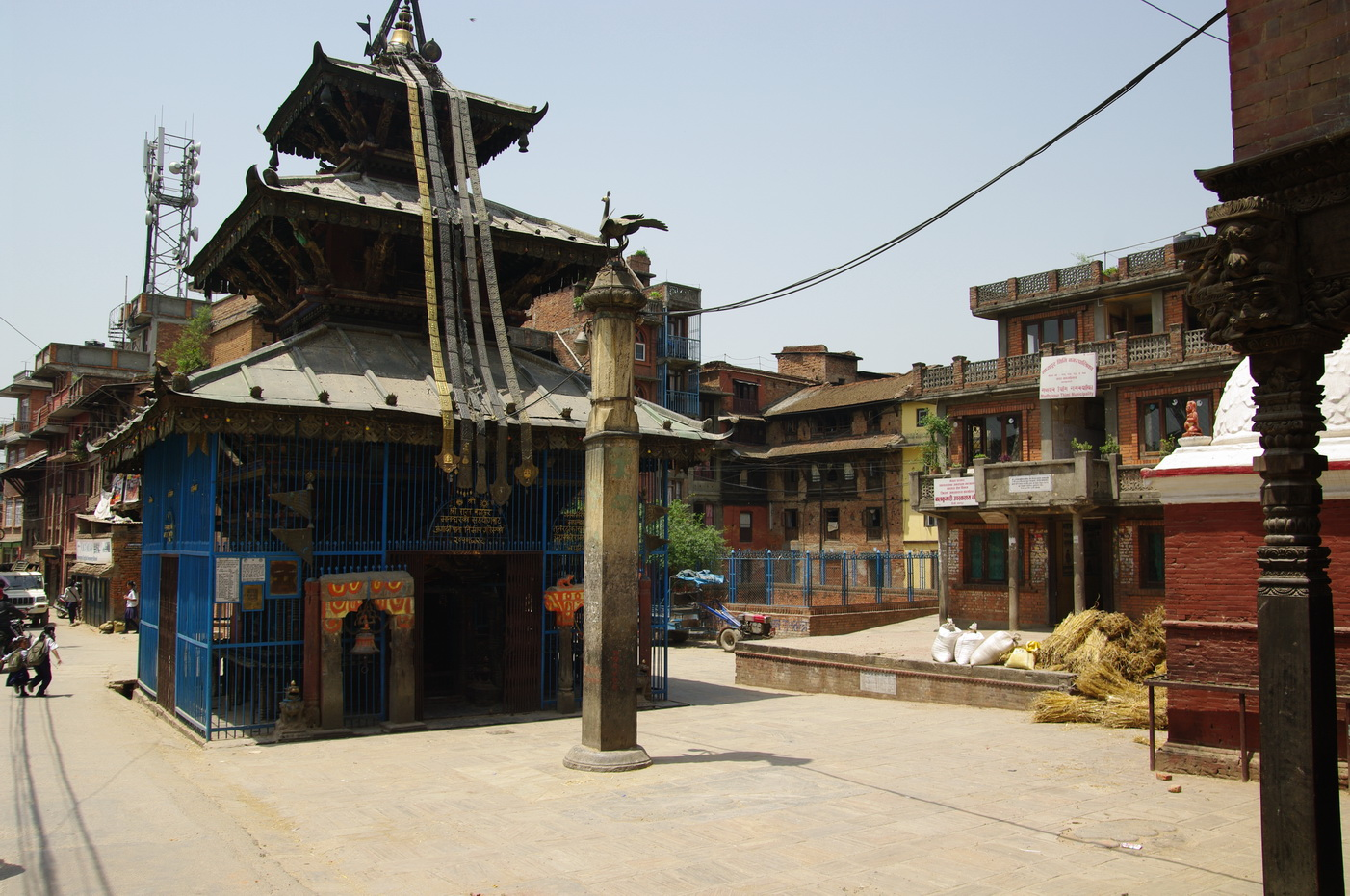

- Location in Nepal

Religion
- Affiliation: Hinduism
- District: Bhaktapur District

Location
- Location: Thimi
- Country: Nepal
- Interactive map of Balkumari Temple
- Coordinates: 27.6759°N 85.3850°E

Architecture
- Type: Pagoda

Balkumari Temple (Nepali: बालकुमारी मन्दिर) of Bhaktapur District is one of four Kumari temples in Kathmandu Valley. The temple was built in the 17th century. In 2015, the original idol of Digu Bhairav from the 17th century was stolen from the temple.

Sindoor Jatra starts form this temple. The festival is carried out in the temple in Nepali New Year Day. The pilgrims throw Vermillion powder (Sindur) in sky during the festival hence the name Sindoor Jatra. During the Jatra, 32 chariots are built containing the idols of various gods and goddesses.

== Architecture ==
The Balkumari temple has a square base and has three stories. A column with a peacock on its top decorates the temple in front. The peacocks are also welded on the corners of the temple. A Bhairab temple also lies in the premise.

== Mythology ==
According to mythology, a merchant from Thimi fell in love with the princess of Lubhu. The princess got pregnant and asked the merchant to take her with him. The merchant agreed in the condition that she bring the goddess Balkumari along with her. The princess brought the goddess with her and then the Balumari temple was shifted from Lubhu to Thimi.

== See also ==
- List of Hindu temples in Nepal
