= Vishva Lakshmi =

Vishva Lakshmi Devi
- Queen of Bhaktapur
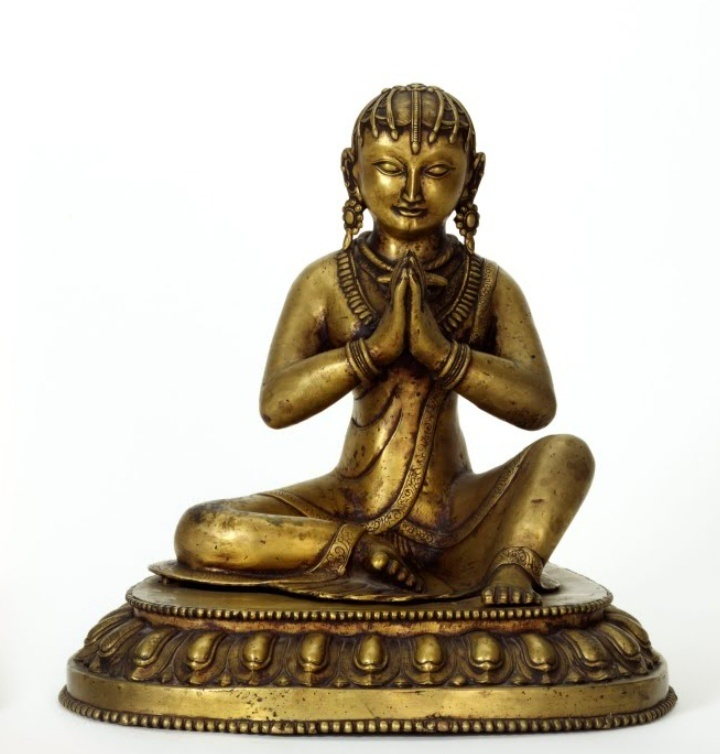
- Gilt copper statuette from the 17th century

Queen Consort of Bhaktapur
- Tenure: 21 September 1696 – 19 May 1722
- Predecessor: Lālamati
- Successor: Briddhi Lakshmi
- Born: Unknown
- Died: sometime after April 1723; Bhaktapur, Nepal
- Spouse: Bhupatindra Malla
- Issue: Ranajit Malla
- Dynasty: Malla Dynasty (by marriage)

Vishva Lakshmi (Nepal Bhasa: 𑐧𑐶𑐱𑑂𑐰𑐮𑐎𑑂𑐲𑑂𑐩𑐷) was the queen consort of Bhaktapur and the spouse of Bhupatindra Malla, who ruled from 1696 to 1722. She was also the mother of Ranajit Malla, the last king of Bhaktapur. She was married to Bhupatindra Malla on 4 November 1687.

Vishva Lakshmi commissioned the temple of Brahmayani in Panauti and donated lands for funding the regular worship of the goddess. There is also a statuette of her at the temple of Brahmani in Panauti. Her last reference comes from a copper plate inscription dated to April 1723 which mentions her donation of some land for funding a ritual worship of Taleju, the tutelary goddess of the Mallas.

== Gallery ==
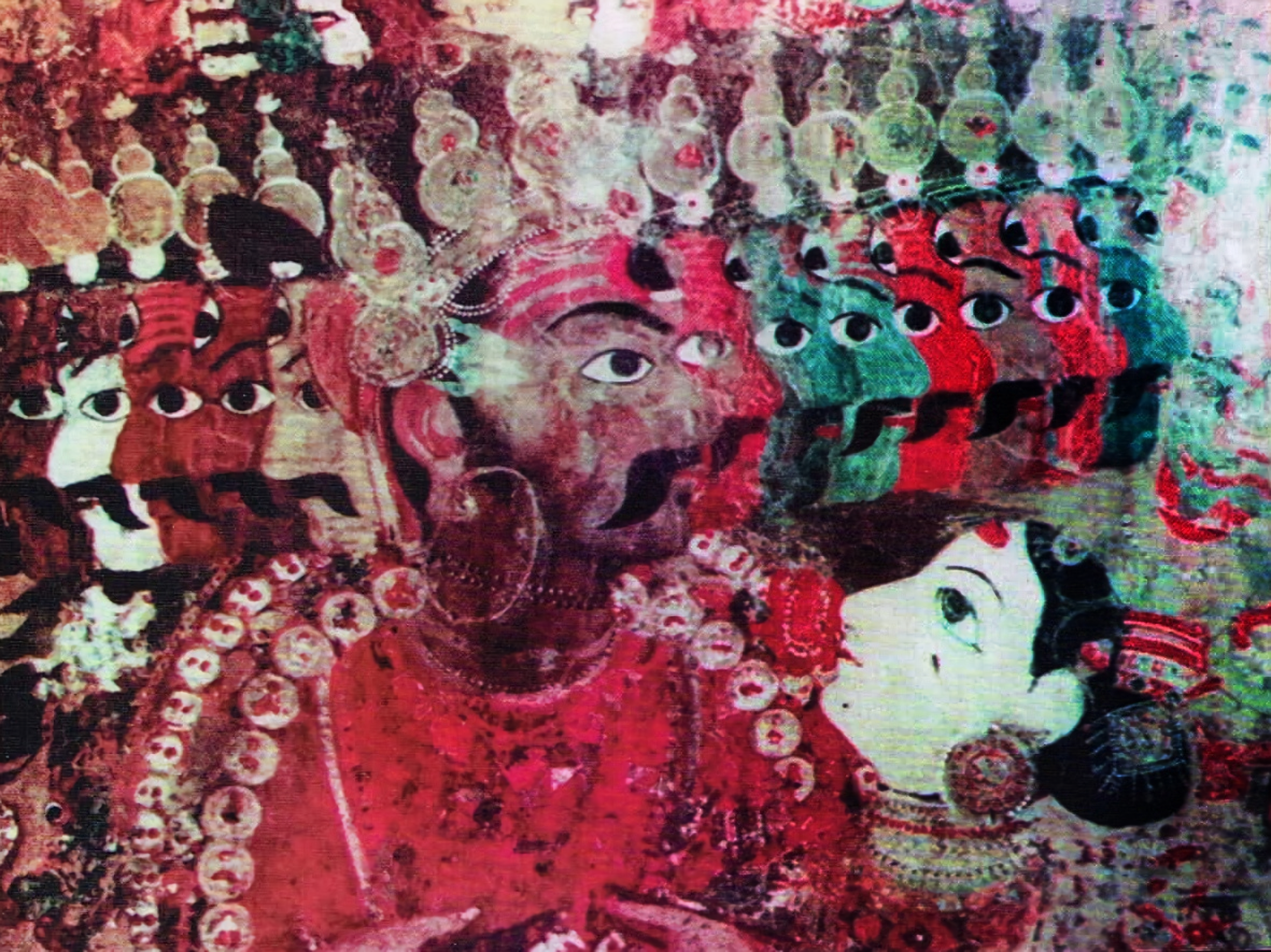
Mural from 1708 at the royal palace of Bhaktapur depicting Vishva Lakshmi and her husband as a divine couple. Vishva Lakshmi also had a small mole on her chin, as can be seen in this mural.

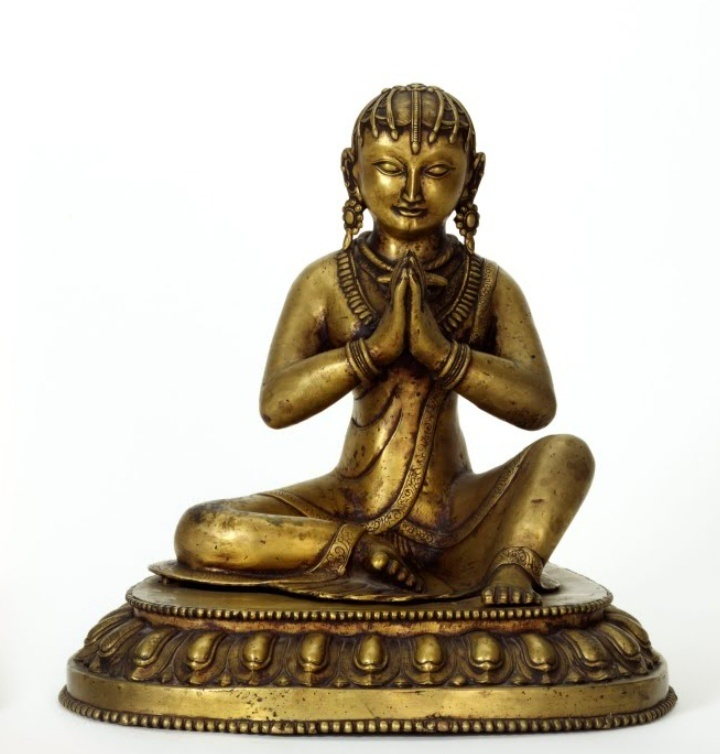
Gilt copper statuette at the Art Gallery of New South Wales. Based on her jewellery, this statuette seems to have been made for her wedding.

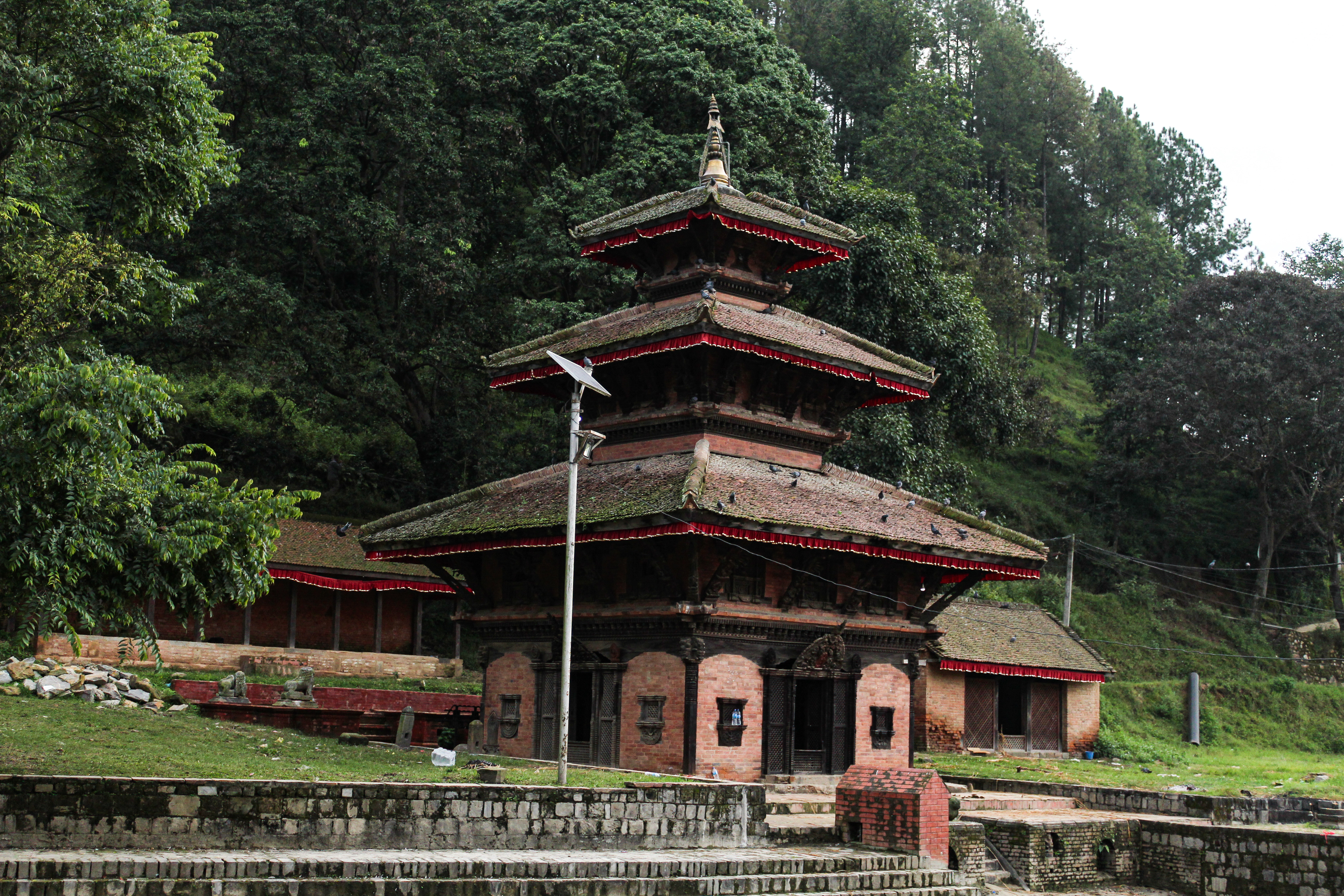
The temple of Brahmayani in Panauti, completed in 1715 was commissioned by Vishva Lakshmi.

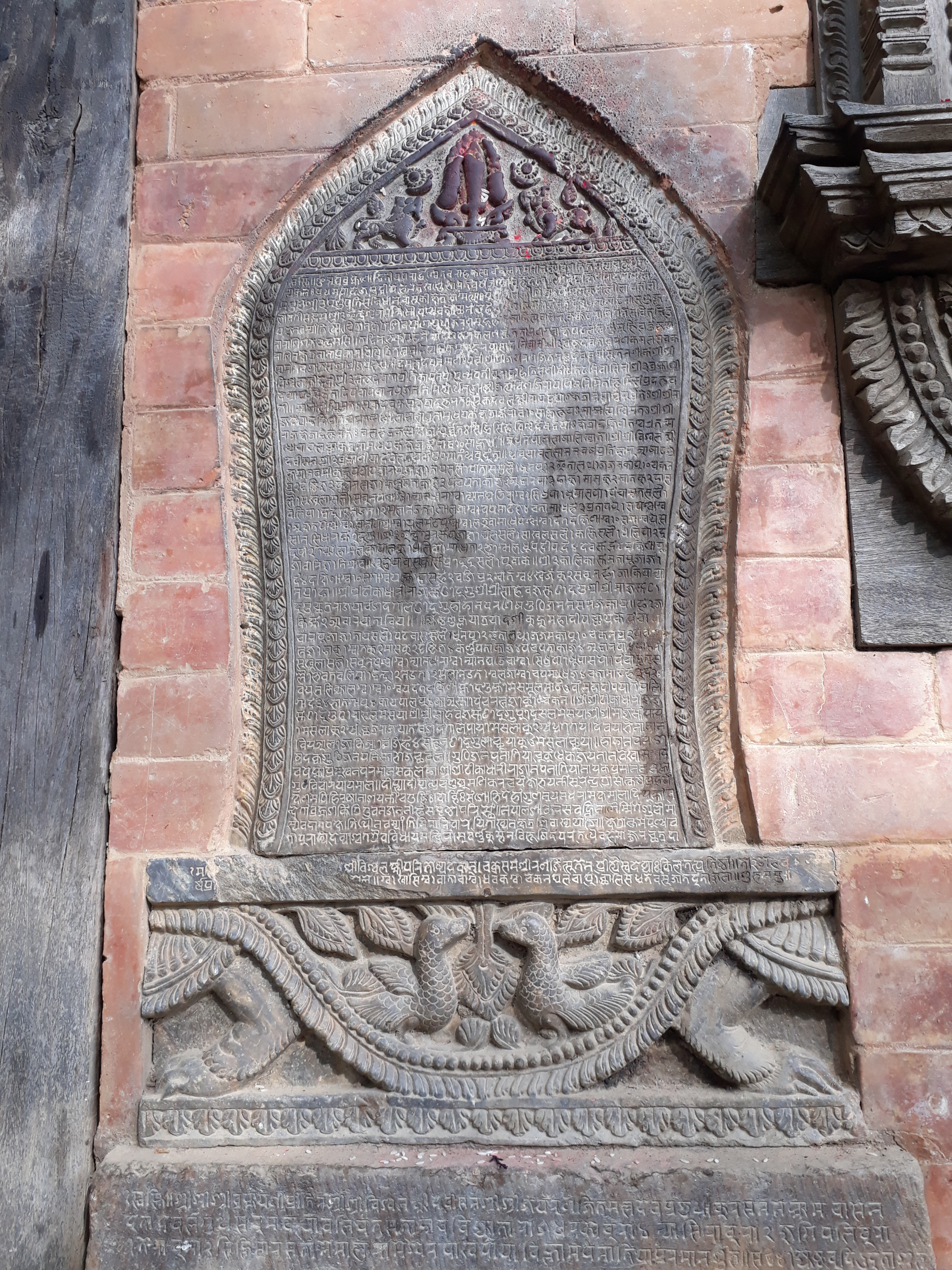
Vishva Lakshmi's Newar Language stone inscription at the temple of Brahmani, Panauti.

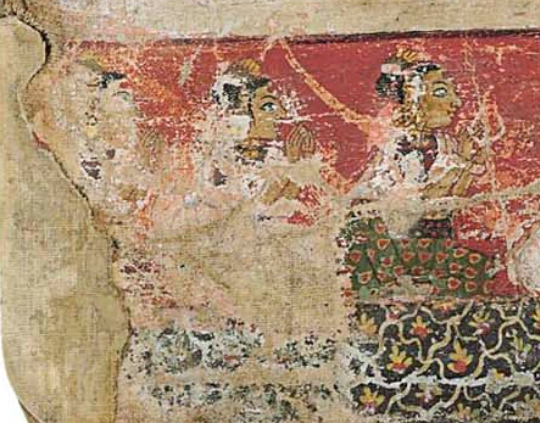
Highly damaged miniature of Vishva Lakshmi (far left) from a Paubha from the 18th century.

== See also ==
- Bhupatindra Malla
- Ranajit Malla
- Nyatapola Temple
- Bhaktapur
