= Bisket Jatra =

Chariot festival in Nepal

Biska Jatra 𑐧𑐶𑐳𑑂𑐎𑐵𑑅 𑐖𑐵𑐟𑑂𑐬𑐵
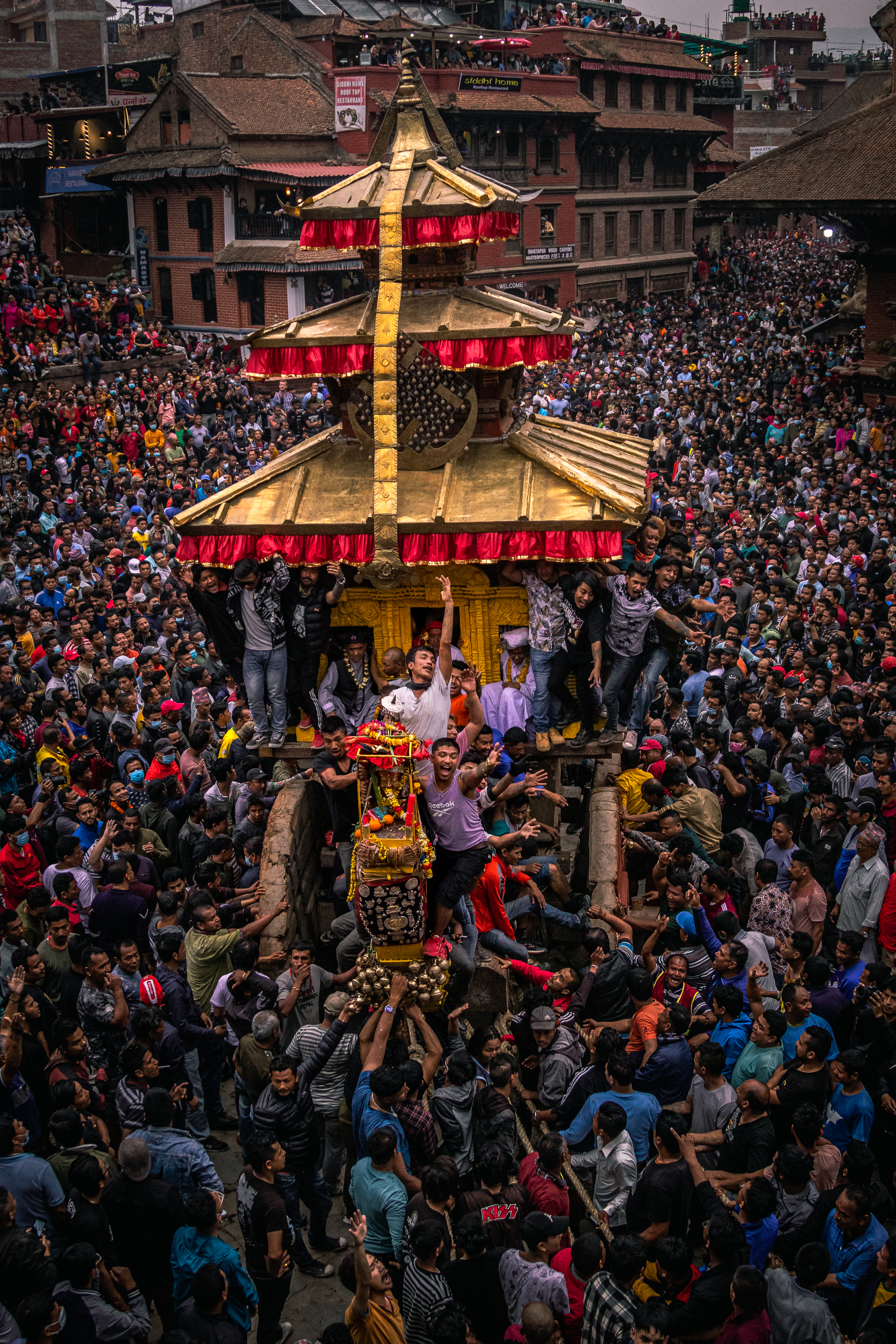
- The bhailakhaḥ or the chariot of Bhairava in Bhaktapur. Photo by: Sushan Mool
- Genre: Festival
- Dates: 14 April (13 April on leap years)
- Frequency: Annual
- Location: Bhaktapur District
- Country: Nepal
- Major events: Religious

Biskā Jātrā (Newar: 𑐧𑐶𑐳𑑂𑐎𑐵𑑅 𑐖𑐵𑐟𑑂𑐬𑐵, biskāḥ jātrā), also known as Biska Jatra (Nepali: बिस्का जात्रा) refers to an annual festival celebrated in April at Bhaktapur, Thimi and their environs in Nepal. In many of the places where it is celebrated including Bhaktapur and Thimi, Biska acts as the main celebration of the year. Biska unlike other Nepalese festivals is based on the Hindu solar calendar instead of the Nepalese lunar calendar.

The name Biska encompasses festivals celebrated around the same time in Bhaktapur, Thimi, Bode, Nagadesh, Dhapasi, Tokha, Dhulikhel, Katunje, Gundu and Sanga all of which were once part of the Kingdom of Bhaktapur. Biska originated as festival celebrating Vaisakhi, the Solar New Year, in Bhaktapur by exhibiting a long banner tied in a long wooden pole. During the Malla dynasty, the festival spread to other parts of the kingdom and many new traditions were added, including the ratha festival of Bhairava and his consort Bhadrakali in Bhaktapur, the sindoor throwing festival in Thimi, both of which constitute the most iconic part of the festival today. Each city has its own unique way of celebrating the festival.

== Etymology ==
The name biskāḥ is popularly believed to originate from the Newar term, bi sika, translating to "the serpent is killed", linking it to a popular legend regarding the festival's origin involving the death of two serpents.

In actuality however, the name originates from the Classical Newar name for the festival, biskyāta (𑐧𑐶𑐳𑐎𑑂𑐫𑐵𑐟), a term which frequents in many historical records from the Malla dynasty. This Classical Newar term is a compound from of two words, bisika and ketu, where ketu is a direct adaption of the Sanksrit word ketu (केतु) for banner and bisika is the term for the Solar New Year in Classical Newar, derived from the Sanskrit name for the March equinox, viṣuvad . The name refers to a pair of long banner that is exhibited during the Solar New Year in Bhaktapur.

Similarly, in Nepali, the festival is referred to as Bisket Jatra, a Nepali adaptation of the Newar term "biskāḥ jātrā".

== Origin ==
=== Legends ===
Many legends relating to the festival's start of the festival are popularly retold as folklore in Bhaktapur, all of them end with two serpents being killed and their carcass displayed via a long wooden pole. Following are two of the most popular legends:

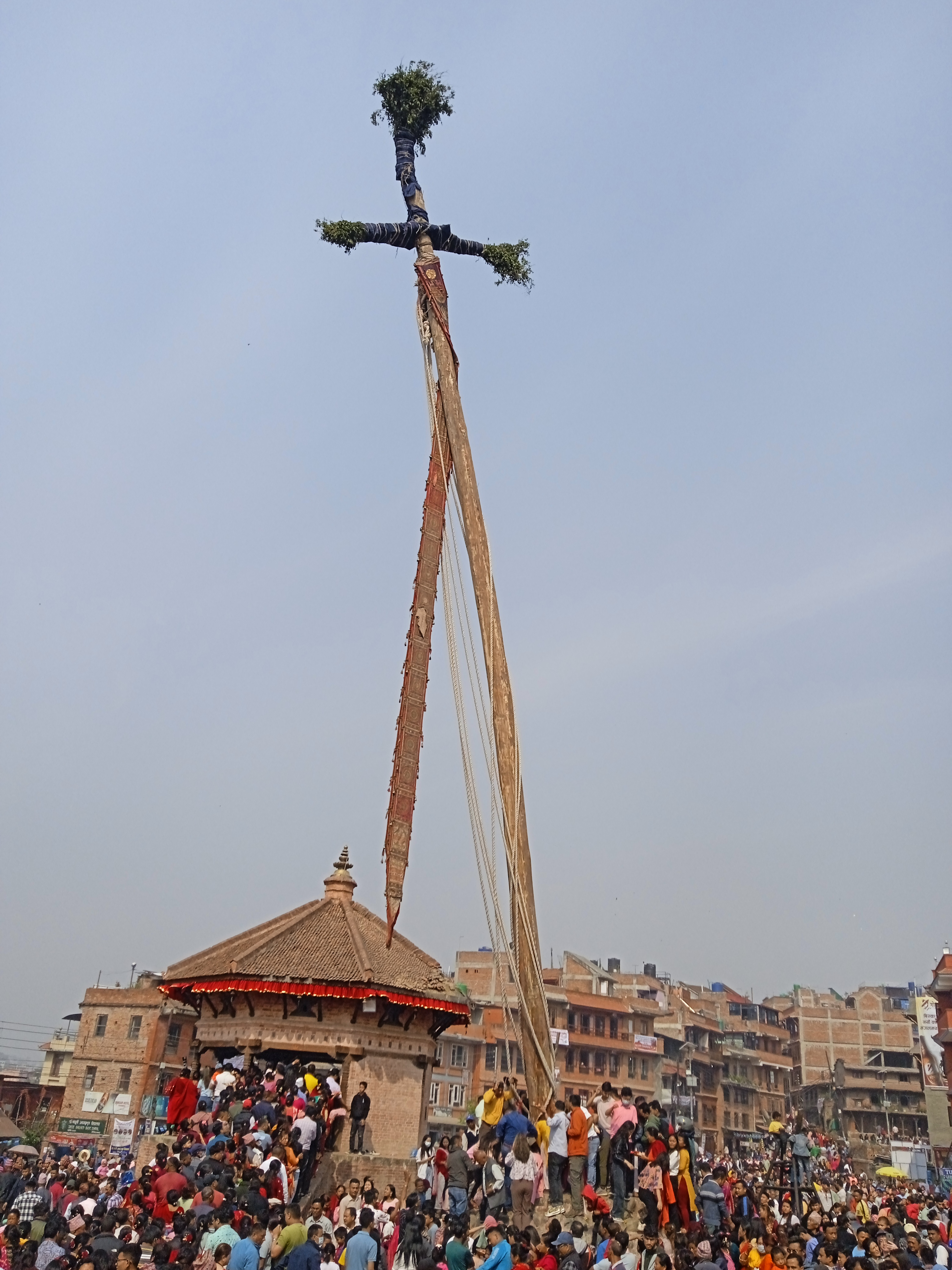
The pair of red banner (Newar: haliṇ pata) in displayed in a long wooden pole (Newar: yasiṇ) at Bhaktapur is locally interpreted as the carcass of two long serpents.

"During the Licchavi Dynasty, the monarch of Bhaktapur, Shivadeva II was troubled by frequent raids from the Kirata and so he sought help from Vajrayogini of Sankhu. The goddess advised Shivadeva to seek Sekhar Āchāju, a Tantric magician. Upon meeting Sekhar Achaju, the king came to know of the magician's ability to transform himself into a tiger using special rice husks. Thus, when the Kirata attacked next time, the Tantric Sekhar Achaju turned himself into a tiger and then summoned hundreds of tigers from the forest; the combined tiger army scared away the Kirata forces. The king, pleased with Sekhar Achaju welcomed him into Thimi with a sindoor throwing festival. Once home, Sekhar Achaju's wife Nararupā, having heard of her husband's secret ability, expressed her wish to see a python (bi in Newar) and requested her husband to transform into one. Sekhar Achaju hands Nararupā a handful of his special rice husks, informing her to throw them once she is satisfied with his transformation so that he could revert back to a human. Having informed his wife, Sekhar Achaju uses his Tantric powers to transform himself into a python but upon seeing the snake, Nararupā runs away in terror. Sekhar Achaju as a python, goes after his wife hoping to transform back into a human. While running Nararupa's jani (a traditional cloth belt) loosens and in order to make her hands free to tighten it, she puts the special rice husks inside her mouth causing her to transform into a python as well. Since the only other person to know Sekhar Achaju's rice husks was the king himself the couple then crawls to Shivadeva's palace, hoping that the king would revert the spell. Shivadeva not knowing the pythons' true identity orders his men to leave the snakes as it is. Hopeless, the couple kill themselves outside the city. Drought and other mishaps follow the couple's death and Shivadeva once again approaches Sekhar Achaju only to find his house empty. However, two snake trails catches his eye and following the trail, he finds two long python carcasses. Shivadeva finally realizes what had happened and in order to celebrate Sekhar Achaju, the man who had saved his kingdom starts a new festival set around displaying the carcass of the heroic Sekhar Achaju and his wife by tying them in a long pole".

Another popular legend regarding the festival's origin is:

"During antiquity, there was a king of Bhaktapur who had a daughter as an only child. Therefore, he declared that anyone who marries his daughter shall be the next monarch of Bhaktapur. Accordingly, a young prince was married to the princess but the very next morning the whole kingdom woke up to find the princess sleeping with a dead prince. It turned out that when the young couple were sleeping together, unbeknownst to them both, a pair of thread emerged from princess's nostrils, which soon assumed the form of two large serpents who killed the young prince in his sleep. Soon, another man was married to the princess but he too turned up dead the next morning. This process went on for quite a while; every time the princess married, her groom would be killed by the serpents emerging from her nostrils during their sleep. Eventually, there weren't any man left in the kingdom willing to marry the princess. Meanwhile, the goddess Bhadrakali disguising herself as an old woman approaches a young man and advises him to marry the cursed princess . She tells him of a mystical sword she hid in a riverbed and advises him to stay awake during the night after their wedding with the sword in hand. The young man does so as he was told and after their wedding stays awake while the princess sleeps. When the two serpents emerge from her nostrils, the young man kills them both with the mystical sword. Thus, when the young man becomes the king, he starts a new festival in honor of the goddess Bhadrakali where he also displays the carcass of the two serpents that he had killed by tying them in a long pole".

=== Historic origins ===
The exhibition of a pair of long red banner (Newar: 𑐴𑐮𑐶𑑄 𑐥𑐟𑑄, haliṇ pata; Sanskrit: विश्वध्वजा; meaning the "world banner") that is displayed during the Solar New Year in Bhaktapur is agreed by historians to be the oldest tradition of the festival. However, contrary to the local folklore, historians also agree that the red banners is not related serpents. Adorned with the Ashtamangala, the banner pair is an auspicious symbol displayed during the Solar New Year to impart good fortune to the people of Bhaktapur for the rest of the year.

== Observations ==
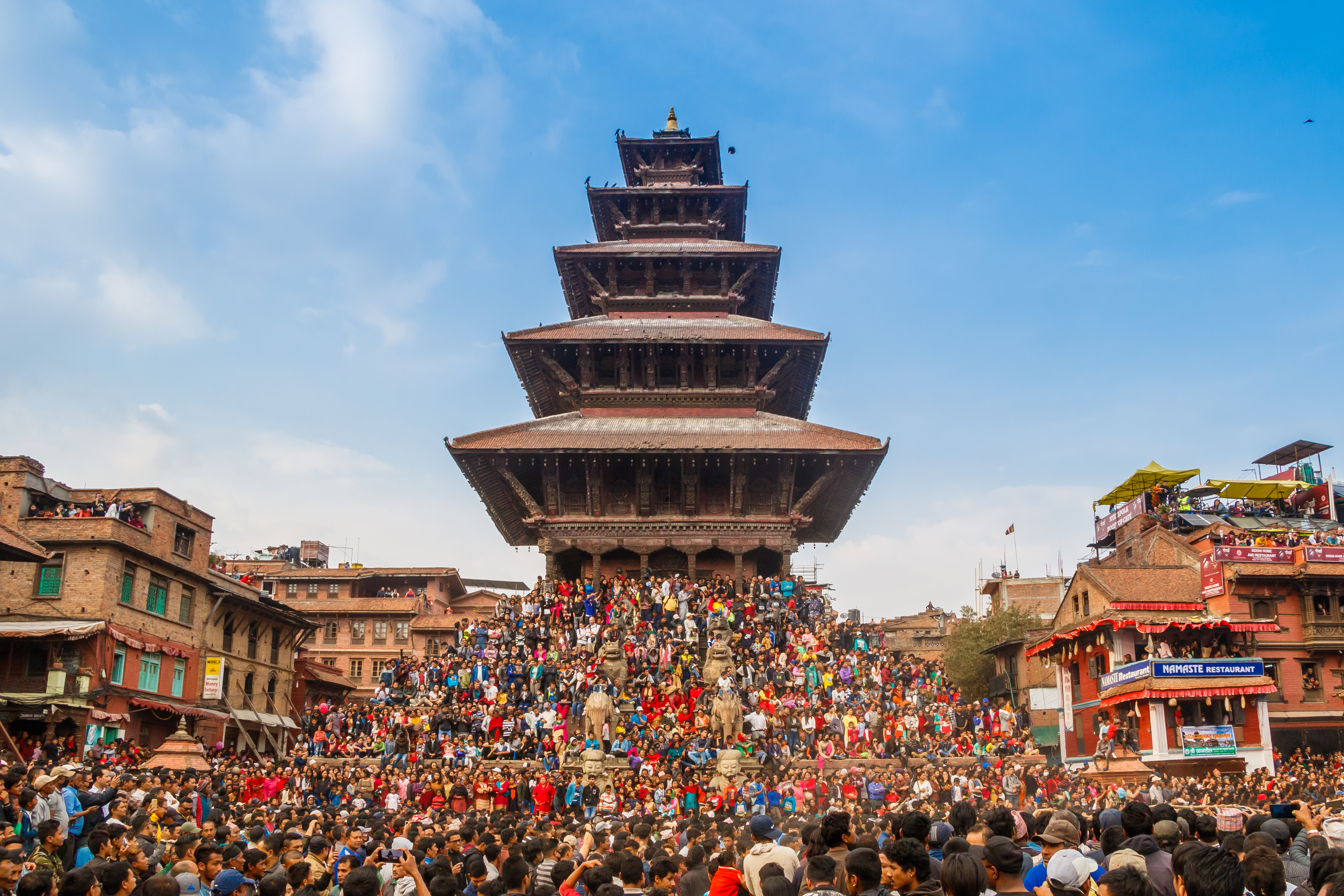
Biska Jatra

The signature event on Bhaktapur Taumadhi kicks off the Biska jatra "dya koha bijyaigu" which means the god Bhairava is brought outside from its temple for the festival, it is a tug-of-war between the Thane (upper) and Kone (lower) part of town. The chariot is pulled from both sides and whoever wins that part of town gets to take the chance of the chariot to their place while the other sides wait for their turn. The chariot is at last pulled down to gahiti where the chariot is kept for two days and again pulled down to Lyasinkhel on the eve of Nepali new year.

An approximately 25 meter Yoh si Dyo is erected in the yosi khyo. The chariot is then pulled on the Lyasinkhel and kept till the next day. The Yoh si is pulled down on the eve of New Year. Then again the chariot is pulled to gahiti and on the last day which is also called " dya thaha bijyaigu" which means god Bhairava is again brought to temple, all the people are, the chariot is again pulled on both sides and finally settled to the premises of 5 storied temple.

Several places in Madhyapur Thimi (Thimi, Nagadesh and Bode) also celebrate Biska Jatra. Folks from various parts of Madhyapur Thimi gather, carrying their own chariots in Layeku Thimi. People celebrate and share greetings, throwing simrik color powder and playing Dhimay music.

Bode witnesses a tongue-piercing ceremony. One resident spends the whole day with an iron spike piercing his tongue and roams the city by carrying multiple fiery torches on his shoulder. Juju Bhai Shrestha is the most renowned tongue piercer town.

== See also ==
- Gai Jatra
- Indra Jatra
- Vaisakhi
