= Madhyapur Thimi =

Madhyapur Thimi मध्यपुर थिमि Thimi
- Municipality (नगरपालिका)
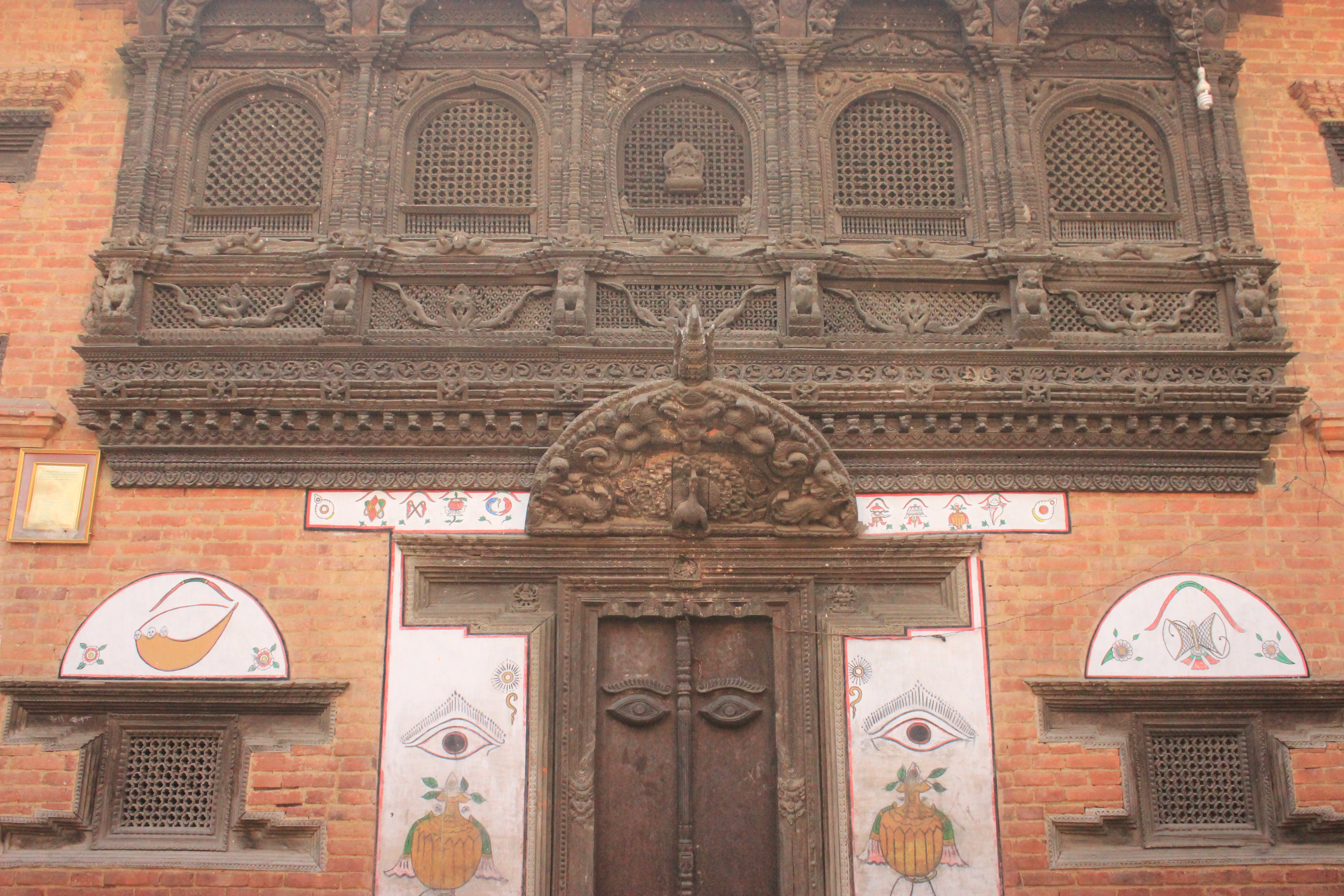
- Layaku (Royal Palace of Madhyapur Thimi)
- Motto(s): हाम्रो कला हाम्रो संस्कृति–मध्यपुर थिमि हाम्रो सम्पत्ति Transl.: Our art, our culture Madhyapur Thimi, our wealth
- Location in Kathmandu Valley Madhyapur Thimi (Bagmati Province) Madhyapur Thimi (Nepal)
- Coordinates: 27°40′50″N 85°22′55″E
- Country: Nepal
- Province: Bagmati
- District: Bhaktapur

Government
  - Mayor: Surendra Shrestha (NC)
  - Deputy Mayor: Vijaya Shrestha([[Communist Party of Nepal (Maoist Centre)[CPN-Maoist]])

Area
  - Total: 11.47 km^{2} (4.43 sq mi)

Population (2021)
  - Total: 119,955
  - Density: 10,460/km^{2} (27,090/sq mi)
  - Religion: Hindu Buddhist
- Time zone: UTC+5:45 (NST)
- Area code: 01
- Website: madhyapurthimimun.gov.np

Madhyapur-Thimi, also known as Thimi, (Nepali: मध्यपुर-थिमि) is a municipality in Bhaktapur District in the Bagmati Zone of central Nepal. Thimi lies between Kathmandu, Lalitpur and Bhaktapur in the Kathmandu Valley. It is one of the ancient cultural and historical places along the trade route from Bhaktapur to Kathmandu. The city is situated on elevated land and occupies an area of 11.47 square kilometres (4.43 sq mi), divided into nine administrative wards.

The mayor as of 2022 is Surendra Shrestha of the Nepali Congress.

The deputy mayor as of 2022 is Bijaya Shrestha of the Communist Party of Nepal (Maoist).

== Archaeology ==
There are indications that the city may be as old as 3000 BC. A recent work by Mohan Pant and Shuji Funo compared the very regular grid layout of Thimi to other ancient cities in the Indus valley and Nepal. The details of the grid dimensions of city blocks are very close to those of Mohenjo-daro and Sirkap (part of ruins near Taxila) in Pakistan; also Patan, Nepal. The authors found that plot dimensions measure 9.6 metres (31 ft) by 19.2 metres (63 ft), and are very uniform. These dimensions correspond to Indus Valley Civilization.

== Etymology ==
Madhypur-Thimi is situated in the center of the valley between Patan, Kathmandu and Bhaktapur. Because of its position it served as a bulwark between Bhaktapur, Patan and Kathmandu during the late malla period when there were often battles among the three kingdoms of the valley. Several legends surround the name "Thimi" and its meaning. Legend says that because the people of Thimi so successfully defended Bhaktapur, the kings of Bhaktapur called them "Chhemi", meaning "capable people", thus praising them for their loyal constant support. Gradually the name of the settlement became "Thimi". In 1825 B.S., during unification campion of Nepal, King Prithivi Narayan Shah conquered Khoppring State (Khopa-dey). He then decided to rename his kingdom from Gorkha to Nepal and moved the capital to Yey-dey/Kantipur, which is now Kathmandu. He went on to rename all the captured cities in the Parbati/Khas language. For example: - Yey became Kantipur, - Yala/Patan was renamed to Lalitpur, - Khopa turned into Bhaktapur, and - Thimi was changed to Madhyapur. "Madhya" means centre and "pur" means city; therefore Madhyapur means city located in the centre. The oldest known name of the city is "Themmring".

== Demographics ==
Madhyapur-Thimi is an ancient Newari town and is a centre of Newar culture. In Chaitra 18 2053 B.S the Government of Nepal merged it with five different VDCs to form Madhyapur Thimi municipality.

== History ==
According to legends Lichchavi king Narendra Dev kept his youngest son Bal Dev in the palace of Madhyapur Thimi (Thimi Durbar or Layaku). Now it has been established as a government school and still today also the palace is considered to be the main place of goddess Balkumari.

== Places of interest ==
=== Balkumari Temple ===
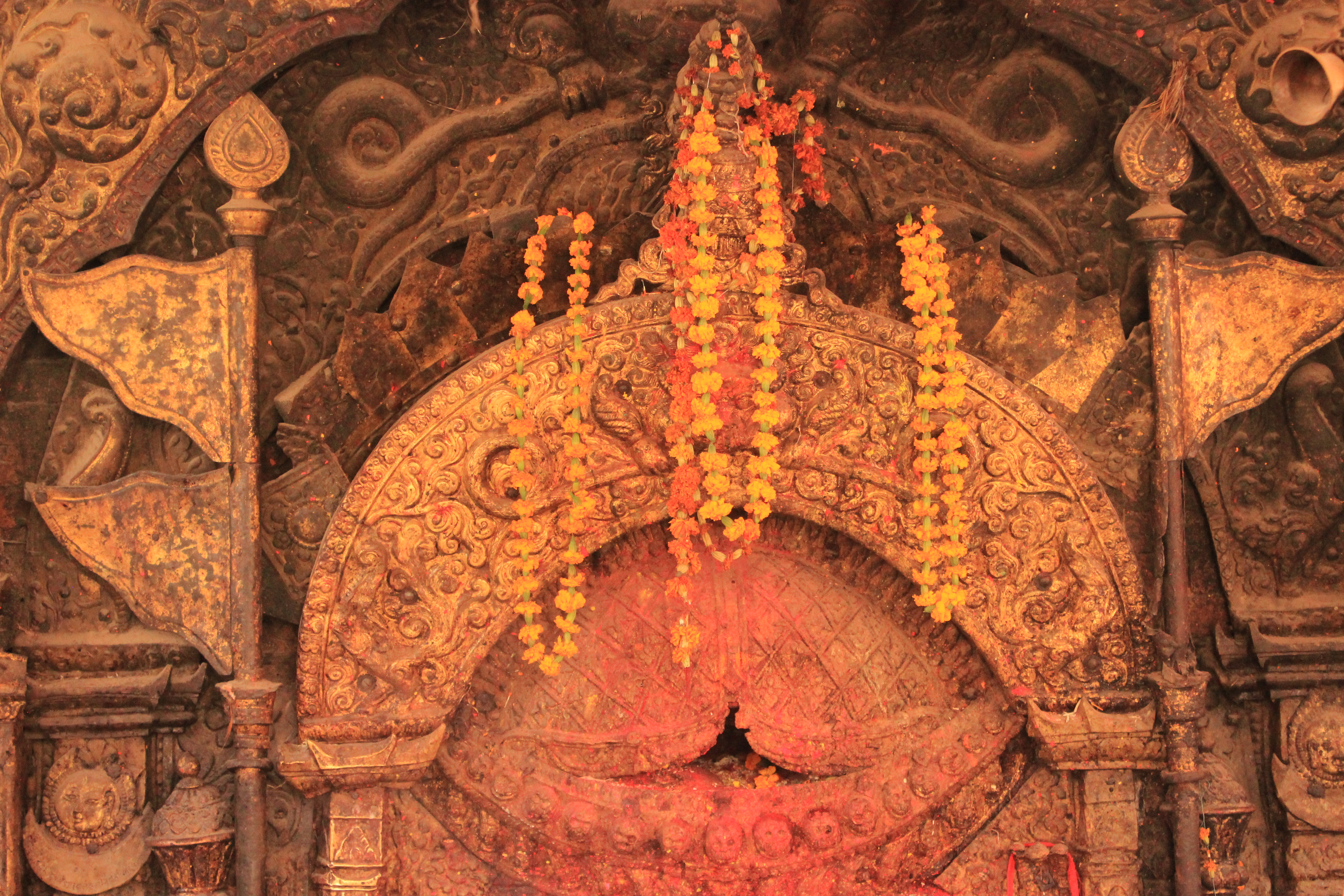
Balkumari goddess

The people of Kathmandu Valley have been worshiping four Ganesh, four Kali, four Kumari, four Varahi, four Mahalaxmi and four Ganga. Among the four Kumaris, one is Kolakhu (Balkumari) of Thimi. The temple of Balkumari is said to be about three hundred years old. Goddess Balkumari is regarded as the guardian deity of Thimi and she is the beloved goddess of Thimi. Ceremonial rituals in relation to important events of life including marriage, bratabanda etc. cannot be done without propitiating this deity.

The present three storeyed temple of goddess Balkumari was built probably around the 17th century. This temple stands in the brick-paved rectangular courtyard with rest houses around it. There is a temple of lord Bhairab and some small shrines of different gods and goddess spread around the courtyard.

The legends regarding the temple of goddess Balkumari say that the merchants from ancient Thimi used to go to Lubhu for trading. One of them established a relationship with the princess of Lubhu. Soon the princess became pregnant. The princess asked the merchant to take her with him. The clever merchant put forward a condition that he would take her with him only if she agrees to bring goddess Balkumari with her to which the princess happily agreed. Since ancient times there were only four Balkumari temples in the Kathmandu Valley. Therefore, when the pregnant princess was brought to Thimi, goddess Balkumari was also permanently shifted from Lubhu to Thimi since there could not be more than four major Balkumari temples in the valley. Till now as well to commemorate that a pregnant princess brought the deity, there is a womb like structure just above the idol of the deity inside the ancient temple.

Since goddess Balkumari is the primary deity of Thimi, during the annual Biska Jatra, her chariot is not taken to whole Thimi. Her chariot is taken only to the temple of Prachanda Bhairab. It is because, it is believed that the ancient city of Thimi was extended from Balkumari temple in the south and Pranchanda Bhairab temple in the north.

=== Mahalaxmi ===
Among the four Mahalaxmi of the Kathmandu valley, one is located in Bode of Madhyapur Thimi. Mahalaxmi is the Hindu goddess of wealth, prosperity and fortune. She is considered as the younger sister of goddess Balkumari. The people of Bode consider goddess Mahalaxmi as their Ajudeu, mother goddess. This pagoda style two storeyed temple is located in the center of Bode. This temple was constructed around 17th century.

=== Thimi Durbar (Layaku) ===
Thimi durbar is the ancient palace of Thimi, where Bal Dev stayed. This palace is an ancient palace located in the heart of Thimi. The main idol of the goddess Balkumari which is taken out only in Bisket Jatra to perform jatra is kept here. Similarly, the Layaku Bhairab dance of Thimi is also started from here which is held for the following four nights of Gai Jatra. There are many shrines of gods and goddesses kept in this ancient palace including a temple dedicated to the lord Ganesha and goddess Taleju Bhawani which is opened in the tika of Mohani.

=== Other heritages ===
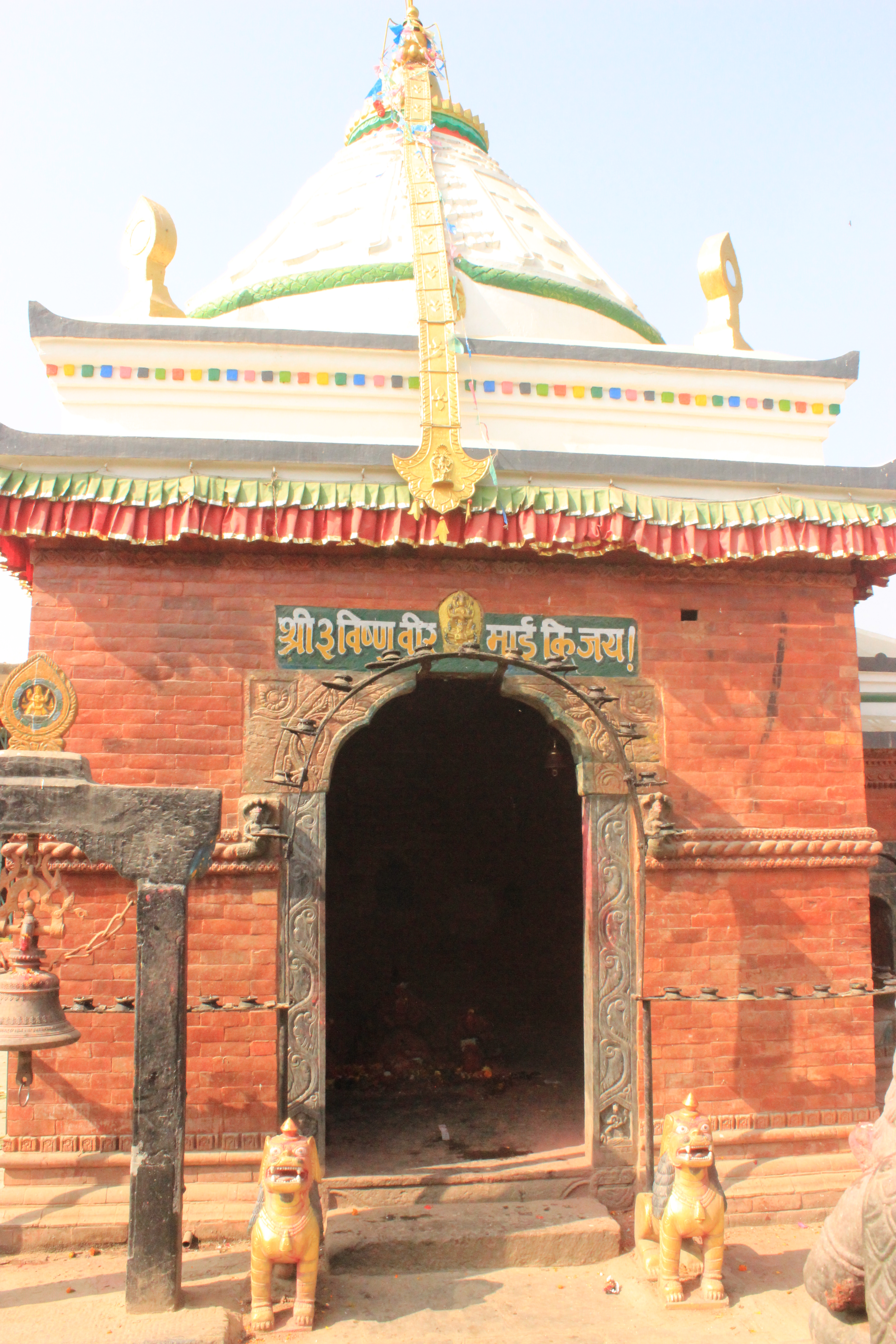
Shree 3 Bishnu Bir Mai, Sunga Tole

Madhyapur Thimi is an ancient town rich for its temples. Many temples dedicated to different gods and goddesses are located here, including Siddhikali Temple, Dachin Barahi temple, Vaisnavi (Vishnu Bir) temple at Sunga Tole, Prachanda Bhairab temple, Machhindranath (Nepal Bhasa: Janamaadya) temple, an ancient monastery and many temples dedicated to lord Ganesh are some important heritages of Thimi. The Siddhi Ganesh temple and the Nagadesh Buddha Bihar are the important places of Nagadesh of Madhyapur Thimi. Siddhi Ganesh is considered as the son of Balkumari. During the annual Bisket Jatra, the chariot procession used to start only when the chariot of Siddhi Ganesh was taken to the Balkumari premise. Once Nagadesh a demon used to live in Nagadesh. He used to come there whenever he liked and kill people for his meal. The people there promised that they would bring food for him daily. The demon put forward a condition that he would need a person daily as his meal. The people agreed and there was a tradition of arranging the food for the demon by a different family of the village daily. Time passed by. The people in Nagadesh then one day prayed to goddess Balkumari for help. She immediately sent Siddhi Ganesh, her oldest son to the spot to kill the demon. Siddhi Ganesh killed him and when he was about to return the people of Nagadesh requested Sidhi Ganesh to stay there and protect them. Since then Sidhi Ganesh is worshiped as the Aju Dyo of Nagadesh. Similarly, the Bode Layaku, Pacho Ganesh, Kalika temple and Neeel Barahi temple are some important heritages of Bode.

=== Pottery area ===
Madhyapur Thimi is also famous for pottery and clay works. The people of Thimi (Prajapati) are mostly involve in pottery from the ancient time. The places of Thimi such as Chapacho, Nasanani, Tulanani, Kumanani, Wachunani, Janlanani, Duinani, Digutole, Ganchanani, Tahanani, Pacho, Duwaphalcha, Gungachiwa are the pottery squares of Thimi.

== Population ==
At the time of the 2011 Nepal census it had a population of 83,036.

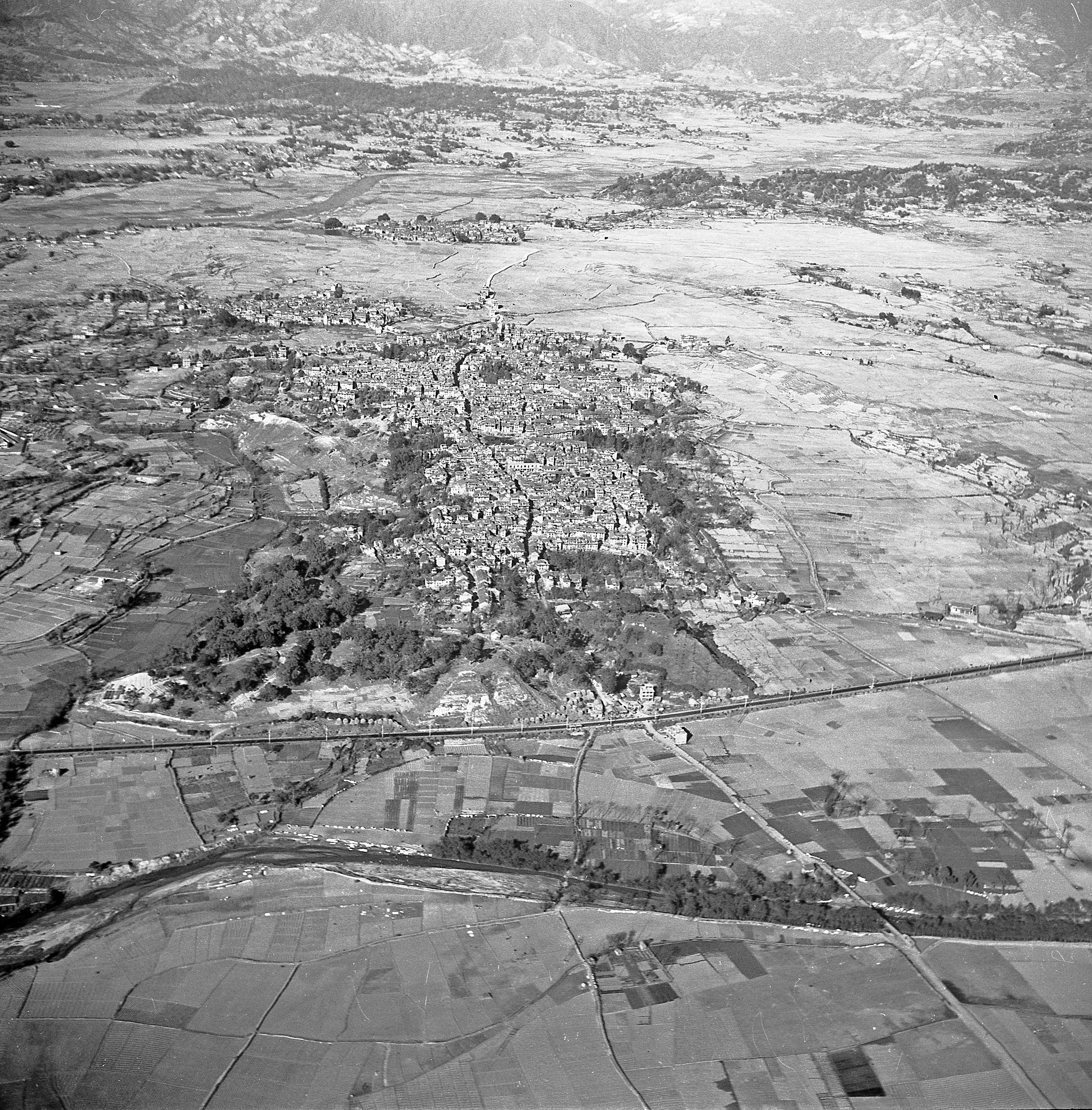
Aerial view

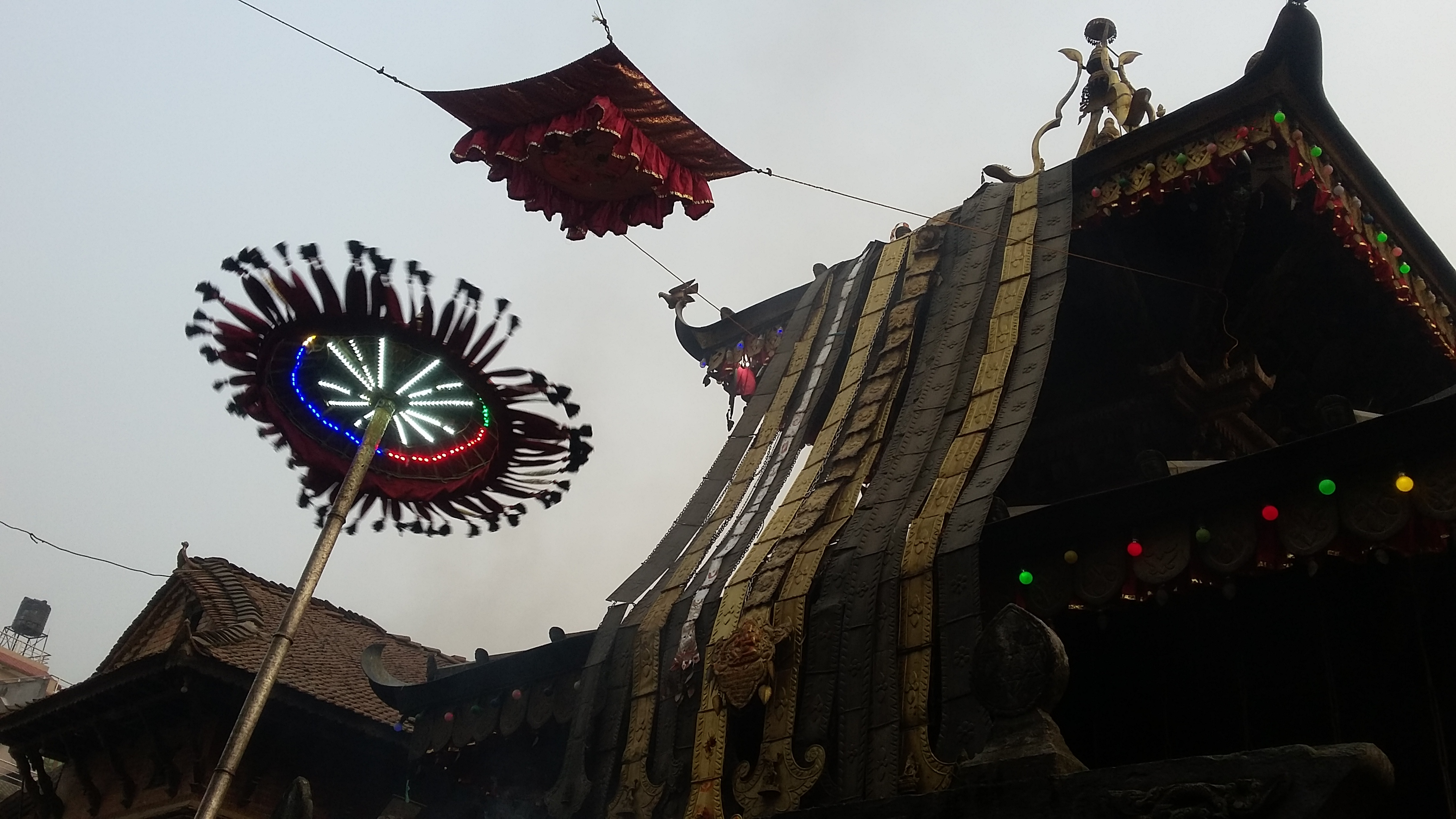
Siddhikali Temple and the Chhatra during Biska Jatra festival

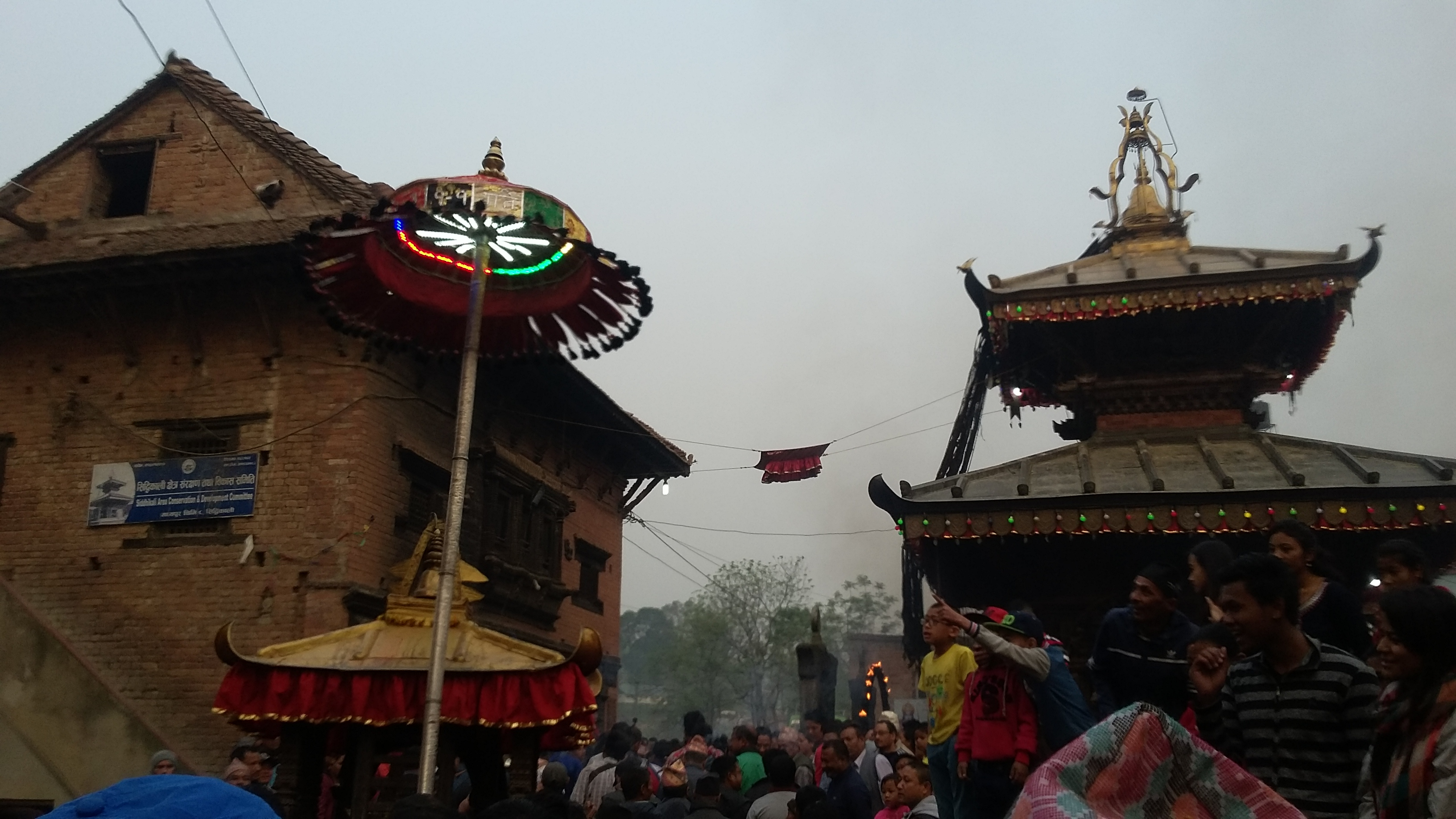
The morning jatra at Siddhikali temple is known as Dyo Bwoyekegu.

== Culture and festivals ==
It is famous for its pottery and cultural programs like Biska Jatra, Gai jatra and other dancing jatra. Being the ancient newar vilification the town celebrates various festivals such as Biska Jatra which falls in mid-April to mark the end of the year and beginning of new year according to Bikram Samvat. Specially the Jatra celebrated all three major towns of Thimi Municipality. The chariot carrying the statues of different Devtas are circulated carried on the shoulders of the youngsters. Altogether 32 chariots are circulated. Similarly there is a unique tradition in Bode to pierce the tongue of a young man to mark the day of escapement of the evil and Jatra begins next to that. Although the Bisket Jatra is celebrated in the whole of Bhaktapur it has special importance and influence that those celebrated in other places of Bhaktapur.

Neelbarahi Naach of Bode Bhaktapur is celebrated in Bode during August after three days of Gaijatra. The people wear masks of the various faces to mark as the reincarnation of the gods. They would dance with the traditional spiritual music during the performance they are not allowed to speak, eat or even drink water.

Another important traditional dance in Madhyapur Thimi is the Layaku Bhaila Naach which is also performed by people of Thimi in the month of August in Thimi after four days of Gaijatra. Altogether five men dance in this traditional dance with four youth and one child. The men wear masks of Bhairab and Daagi (Kumari). There are two Bhairabs and Daagis and one Jyapuga (the child artist). They dance with traditional spiritual music and after dancing they start shivering (except the child artist) because of the divine powers of gods. When they are shivering they lose their sense and know nothing about what happened. The adult dancers who are dancing, get hypnotised when they hear the sound of Daaga baja, Bhusya baja and Ponga baja (Different Newari musical instruments). According to the recent dancers, they feel like a divine power embracing them to encourage dancing more and more. According to them when they are dancing they lose half of their consciousness, heavy clothing starts becoming lighter and when they shiver they feel like in the state of unconsciousness or like when they are asleep. This shows that the community has strong devotion toward their tradition and culture. They must not stop dancing even if it is raining.

Thimi too hosts piercing tongue jatra the night after Indra Jatra. In Thimi, tongue is bored in front of Bhairab temple of Digu tole. After boring the tongue, the very person is taken around the town and sometimes even in other towns and distant places, Changu, Pashupati, for instance. Thus it becomes almost morning when they reach back home. The tongue-bored person has to give customary feast party to one and all who follows him during the circumambulation of the town. Since the people eat feast in the morning without washing their faces, they often chant a slogan, which goes like – Khwah masisen bhoe naye which means not other than eating the feast without washing the face.

Albeit there is no written substantiation regarding this tradition, there is a popular legend behind it. Thus runs the story –

Thimi was once haunted by man-eating demons. The behaviors of demons scared the living daylights out of the people. Nobody could walk in the streets even in the daytime. In the absence of farming, food scarce spread, and the people got into a panic. After many people died off, some people petitioned the royal palace to protect their lives. They said that they had been troubled by the demons and they were unable to do any work and their lives had been ruined by the demons. The king immediately summoned parliament. In discussion, Tantrik said that the demons could be punished by the charisma of lord Bhairab. So the tantrik performed the rituals.

With the divine power of lord Bhairab, the demons were caught. Some demons hid under the eaves but each of them was also caught with the help of Yanmata, explicitly a long handled torch. In front of Lord Bhairab, with permission of the king, their tongues were bored. Each of them was made to carry 108 dhani (1 dhani=2.4 kg) heavy vey (flaming torch) on the shoulder, ghangala (small bells) were tied, then all were made to walk around the country. They were exiled from the settlement and made not to return again under a promise of not giving such troubles.

To make the person realize that the individual who commits evil deeds against humanity, the country, and other individuals would be punished in this manner and disgraced in the presence of everyone as well as even expelled from the country, tongue boring festival was celebrated every year.

Many customs support this legend. As an illustration, Yanmata, the torch carried by the Sayamese (Sayami- the oil pressers) during walk around the town after tongue boring is the emblem to search if there are any demons left hiding under the eaves.

== Current administration ==
In the local election of 2022 Surendra Shrestha was elected as Mayor and Vijaya Shrestha was elected as Deputy Mayor of Madhaypur Thimi .

== See also ==
- Grid plan
