= List of museums in Nepal =

This is a list of museums in Nepal.

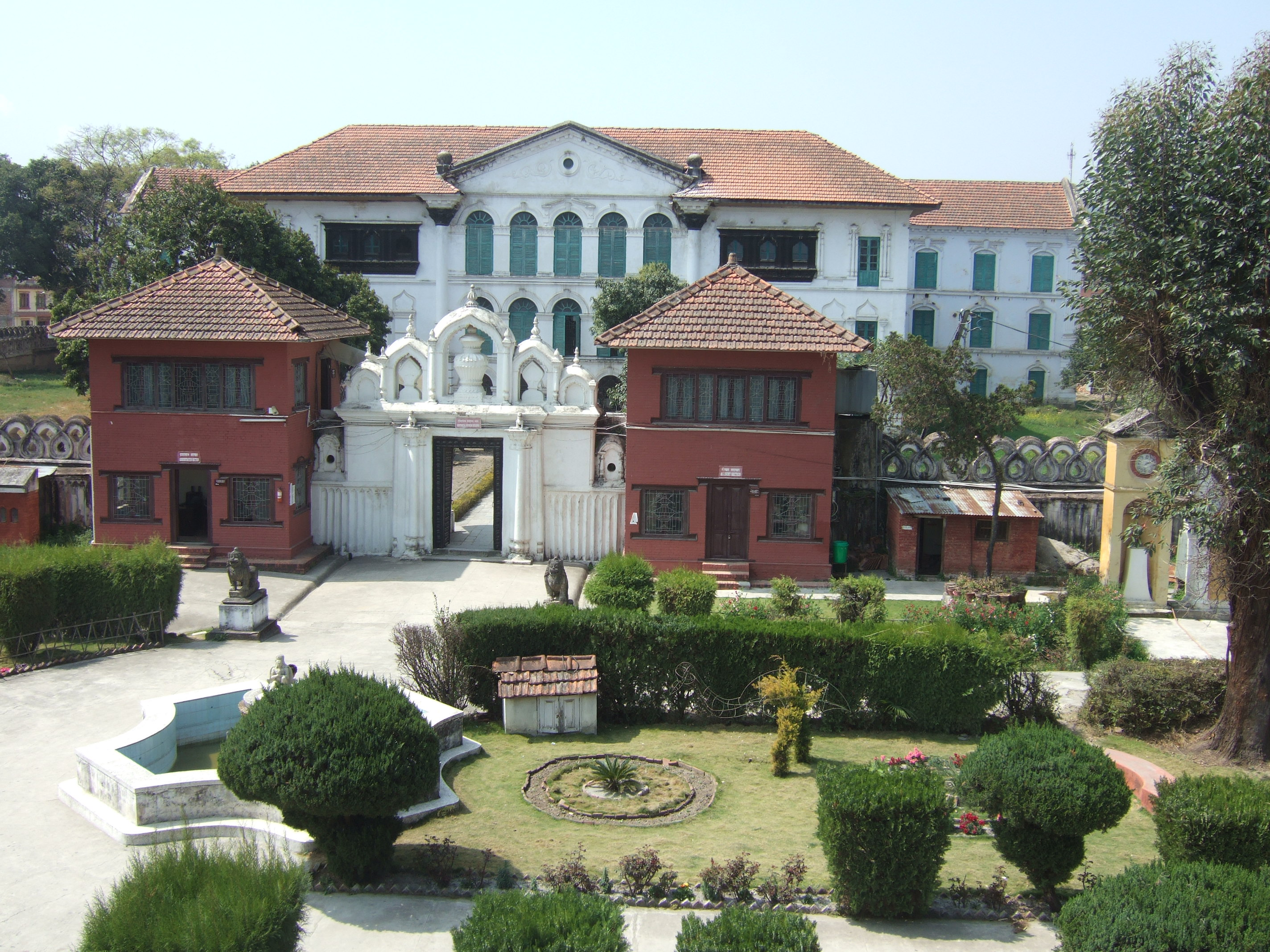
The National Museum of Nepal, established in 1928, has a gallery of Nepalese history.

Name	City	Province	Specialty
National Museum of Nepal	Kathmandu (Chhauni)	Bagmati	General
Bronze and Brass Museum	Bhaktapur	Bagmati	General
Hanuman Dhoka Museum	Kathmandu (Basantpur)	Bagmati	General
Patan Museum	Patan	Bagmati	General
Pujarimath Museum	Bhaktapur	Bagmati	General
International Mountain Museum	Pokhara	Gandaki	General
Tribhuvan Museum	Kathmandu	Bagmati	Palace
Mahendra Museum	Kathmandu	Bagmati	Palace
Birendra Museum	Kathmandu (Basantapur)	Bagmati	Palace
Narayanhiti Royal Palace	Kathmandu (Durbarmarg)	Bagmati	Palace
Natural History Museum of Nepal	Kathmandu (Swayambhunath)	Bagmati	Natural History
Annapurna Natural History Museum	Pokhara	Gandaki	Natural History
Kapilvastu Museum	Tilaurakot	Lumbini	Archeology
Sindhuligadhi War Museum	Kamalamai	Bagmati	War
Republic Memorial Park	Kathmandu (Narayanhiti)	Bagmati	War
The Taragaon Museum	Kathmandu (Boudha)	Bagmati	Art
Children's Art Museum of Nepal	Kathmandu (Hattisar)	Bagmati	Children's museum
Nepal Military Museum	Kathmandu (Chhauni)	Bagmati	Military
Museum of Nepali Art	Kathmandu (Thamel)	Bagmati	Military
Sherpa Culture Museum	Namche Bazaar	Koshi	General
Tharu Cultural Museum & Research Center	Ratnanagar	Bagmati	General
Palpa Durbar Museum	Tansen	Lumbini	Palace
Gurkha Memorial Museum	Pokhara (Lamachaur)	Gandaki	Military
Old Gurung Museum	Ghandruk	Gandaki	General
Dolpo Museum	Dolpo	Karnali	General
Sinja Durbar	Sinja	Karnali	Palace
Dullu Cultural Museum	Baitadi	Sudurpashchim	General
Karnali Province Museum	Surkhet	Karnali	General
Tharu Cultural Museum	Bardiya National Park (Thakurdwara)	Lumbini	General
Lumbini Museum	Lumbini	Lumbini	Archeology
National Art Museum	Bhaktapur (Durbar Square)	Bagmati	Art
Kathmandu Aviation Museum	Kathmandu (Sinamangal)	Bagmati	Aviation
Nepali Folk Musical Instrument Museum	Kathmandu (Tripureshwor)	Bagmati	Music
Janaki Mandir Historical Museum And Janaki Animation	Janakpur	Madhesh	General
Yuma Museum	Taplejung	Koshi	Palace
Kirat Lohorung Museum	Loke Pangma	Koshi	
Limbu Museum	Lalitpur (Kusunti)	Bagmati	
B.P. Museum	Kathmandu (Sundarijal)	Bagmati	Palace
Living Traditions Museum	Bhaktapur (Changunarayan)	Bagmati	Palace
Gorkha Museum	Gorkha	Gandaki	Palace
3D Art Museum	Imadol	Bagmati	Art
RN Joshi Museum	Patan	Bagmati	Art
Purna Museum of Newa Art	Lalitpur (Kupandole)	Bagmati	Art
Itumbaha Museum	Kathmandu (Indrachowk)	Bagmati	
Udaaya Museum	Kathmandu (Asanchowk)	Bagmati	
Chittadhar Hridaya Memorial Museum	Kathmandu (Naradevi)	Bagmati	
Kathmandu Art House	Kathmandu (Thamel)	Bagmati	Art
Swayambhu Buddhist Museum	Kathmandu (Swyambhunath)	Bagmati	
Panauti Museum	Panauti	Bagmati	General
National Numismatic Museum	Kathmandu (Chhauni)	Bagmati	
Dhankuta Provincial Museum	Dhankuta	Koshi	
Nepal Olympic Museum	Kathmandu (Dasharath Rangasala)	Bagmati	Sports
Nepal Rast Bank Museum	Kathmandu (Thapathali)	Bagmati	
National Ethnographic Museum	Kathmandu (Bhrikutimandap)	Bagmati	
Nepal Police Museum	Kathmandu (Naxal)	Bagmati	Police
Butterfly Museum	Pokhara	Gandaki	
Mustang Eco Museum	Jomsom	Gandaki	Ecomuseum
Bagmati Art Gallery	Kathmandu Nepal Art Council	Bagmati	Art
Dhangadi Aircraft Museum	Dhangadi	Sudurpashchim	Aviation
Universal Art Gallery	Kathmandu (Thamel)	Bagmati	Art
BP Koirala Science Museum	Kirtipur	Bagmati	Science
Kantipur Planetarium	Kathmandu (Tinkune)	Bagmati	Science
Pangboche Hand	Pangboche	Koshi	yeti's scalp and hand

== See also ==
- List of museums
