= Tribhuvan Museum =

Museum in Nepal

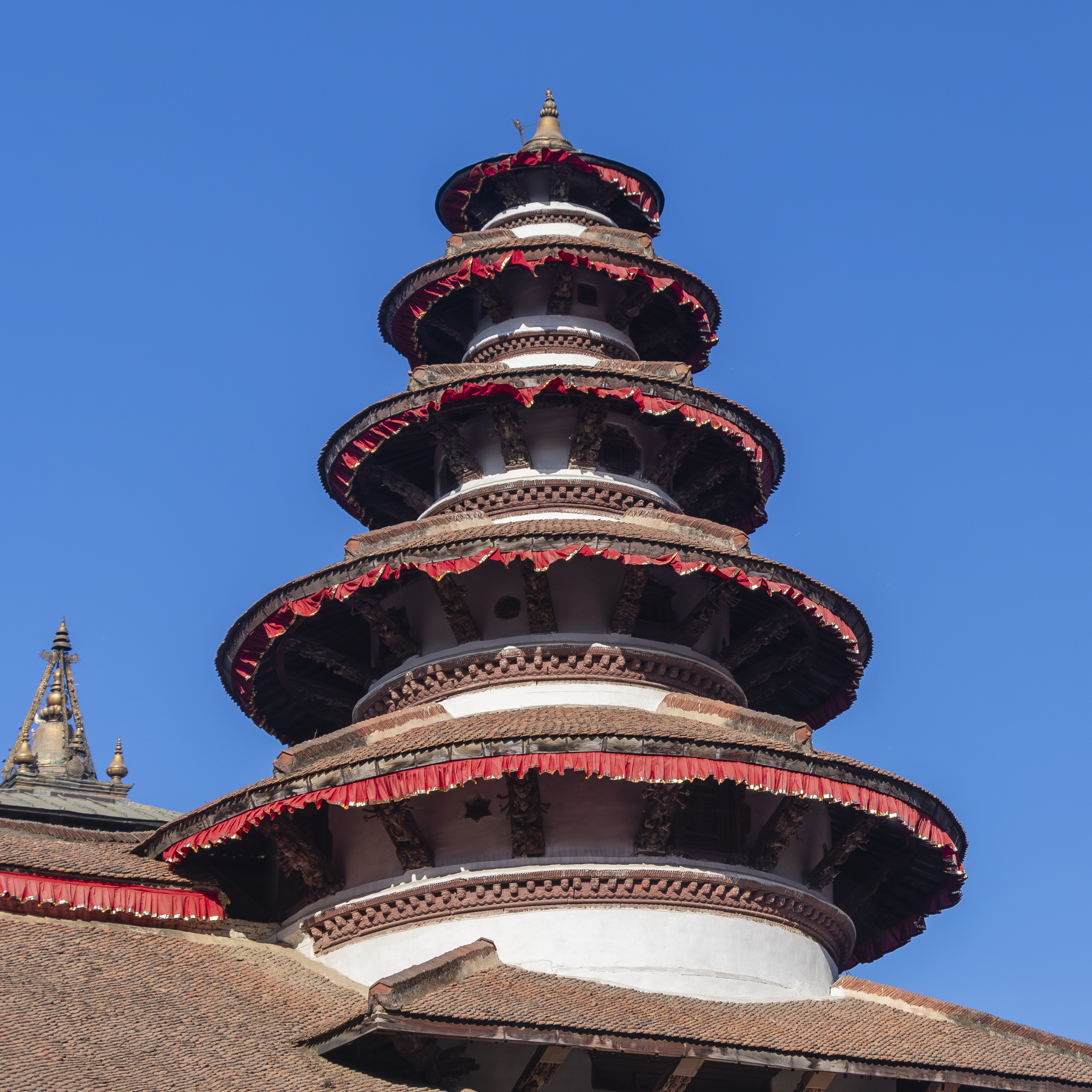
- Historic Pagoda Style Architecture in Tribhuvan Museum, Durbar Square, Kathmandu

- Location at Kathmandu Durbar Square
- Location: Kathmandu, Nepal
- Coordinates: 27.704283°N 85.307355°E
- Type: Palace museum

The Tribhuvan Museum is a museum located in Nepal. It is located alongside Birendra Museum and Mahendra Museum. It contains personal artefacts that belonged to King Tribhuvan Bir Bikram Shah, who is internationally known Nepalese king in the modern history.

== History ==
According to the historians, it is the palace from where Late King Tribhuvan Bir Bikram Shah used to watch over all the houses to make sure if every people during his regime used to cook their food.

== See also ==
- List of museums in Nepal
