= Birendra Museum =

Museum in Kathmandu, Nepal

- Location at Kathmandu Durbar Square
- Location: Kathmandu, Nepal
- Coordinates: 27.704283°N 85.307355°E
- Type: Palace museum

The Birendra Museum is a museum located in Kathmandu Durbar Square, Kathmandu, Nepal. It is located alongside Tribhuvan Museum and Mahendra Museum. It contains personal artefacts that belonged to King Birendra Bir Bikram Shah, who is internationally known Nepalese king in the modern history.

== See also ==
- List of museums in Nepal
