= Stone inscriptions in the Kathmandu Valley =

Ancient stone writings in Nepal

Newar language inscription at Patan

Estampage of Simhadhvaja inscription of Pratap Malla at Taleju Temple, dated 1642 CE

Stone inscriptions in the Kathmandu Valley (Newar: 𑐣𑐾𑐥𑐵𑐮 𑐩𑐞𑑂𑐜𑐮𑐫𑐵 𑐳𑐵𑐴𑐵𑐳𑐣𑐟) refer to ancient stone slabs, pillars and pedestals with text carved on them. They are the most important sources for the history of Nepal. A vast majority of the inscriptions found in Nepal are from the Kathmandu Valley where they are a ubiquitous element at heritage sites. They consist of royal edicts and dedicatory notes on Hindu and Buddhist temples, stupas, statues, water spouts and other architectural structures. Stone inscriptions are locally referred as Sāhāsan (Newar: 𑐳𑐵𑐴𑐵𑐳𑐣).

The early inscriptions were written in the Sanskrit language using Gupta and Kutila scripts during the Licchavi dynasty. During the Malla dynasty, Nepalbhasa (Newar) became the predominant language of inscriptions for royal and religious records, documenting donations, and public works. The earliest dated inscription in Newar language is dated Nepal Era 293 (1173 CE).

== Early inscriptions ==
=== Oldest inscription ===
The oldest dated inscription in the Kathmandu Valley was unearthed at a building site in Maligaon in 1992. The inscription is carved in Sanskrit language and Kushan Brahmi script, on the pedestal of a statue of King Jayavarma. It dates from the year 107 of the Shaka era which corresponds to 184/185 CE. This date is accepted by most historians except Dinesh Chandra Regmi who assigns it to the Gupta era (started on 319 CE). Paleographically, he suggests it is written in Gupta script and is close to Samudra Gupta's Allahabad inscription (360 CE).

=== Licchavi period inscriptions ===
The early inscriptions are from the Licchavi period, and date from the fifth to the ninth centuries. The Licchavi inscriptions are 190 in total, and are carved in Sanskrit language. Among those inscriptions, 53 were written in Gupta script, while 137 were written in Kutila script.

Prior to the discovery of the statue of Jayavarma, the distinction of the oldest dated stone inscription in the valley was held by Licchavi King Manadeva’s inscription carved on a pillar at Changu Narayan Temple in Bhaktapur, which is dedicated to the Hindu deity Vishnu. It was inscribed in the Shaka era 386 which corresponds to 464 CE. It is written in the Sanskrit language and Gupta script.

== Newar inscriptions ==
Newar language inscription of Jagajjyoti Malla, 1631 CE

The first inscription written entirely in Newar is a stone inscription from Bajrayogini Temple of King Rudradeva, dated to 1173 CE (NS 293). The Newar language started to replace Sanskrit in the inscriptions during the Early Malla period. Inscriptions from the 14th century onwards, which are the most numerous, were written in the Newar language and Newar script. Until the conquest of Nepal by the Shah Dynasty in 1769, almost all inscriptions were written in Newar script.

== Multilingual inscriptions ==
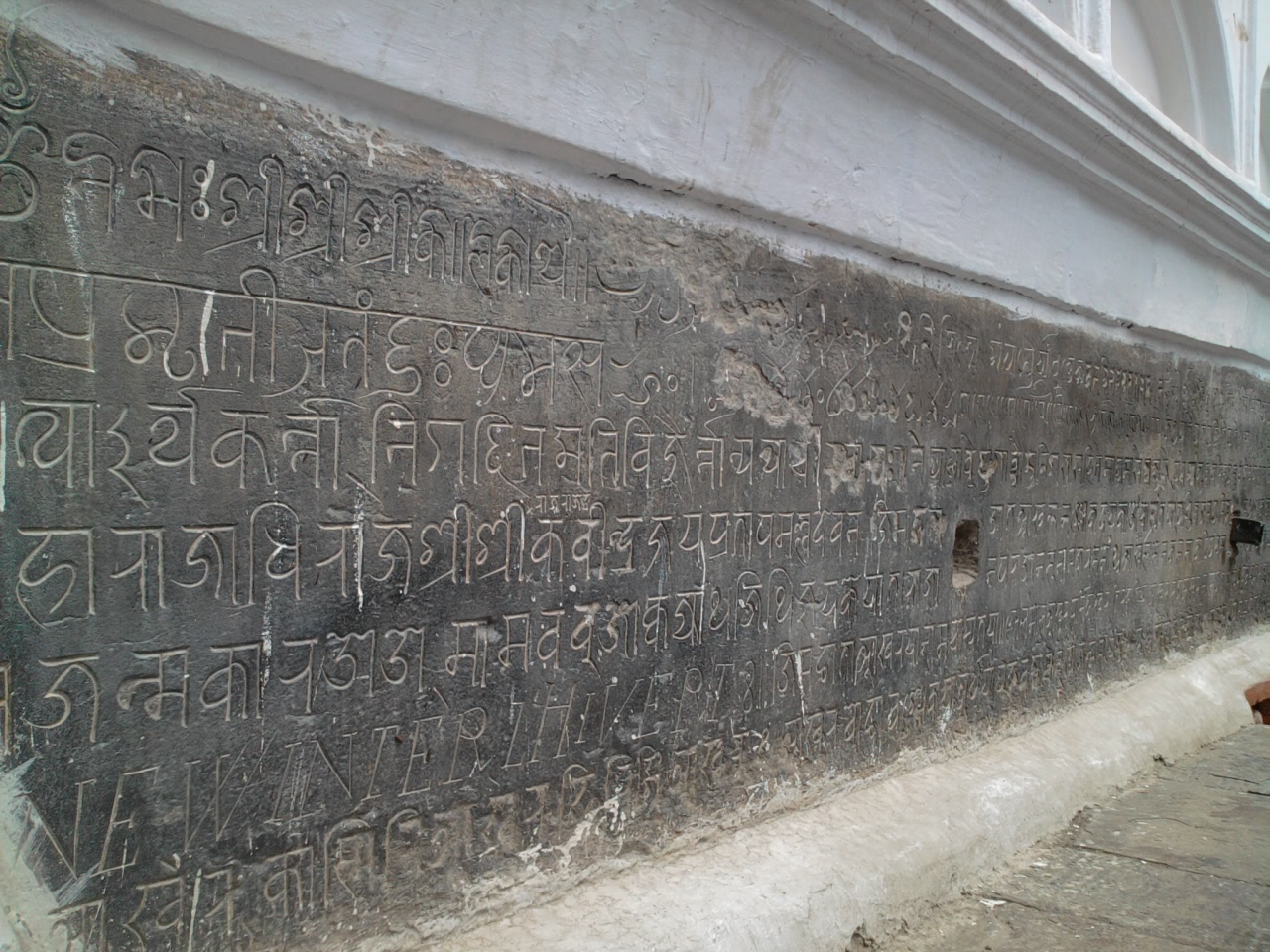
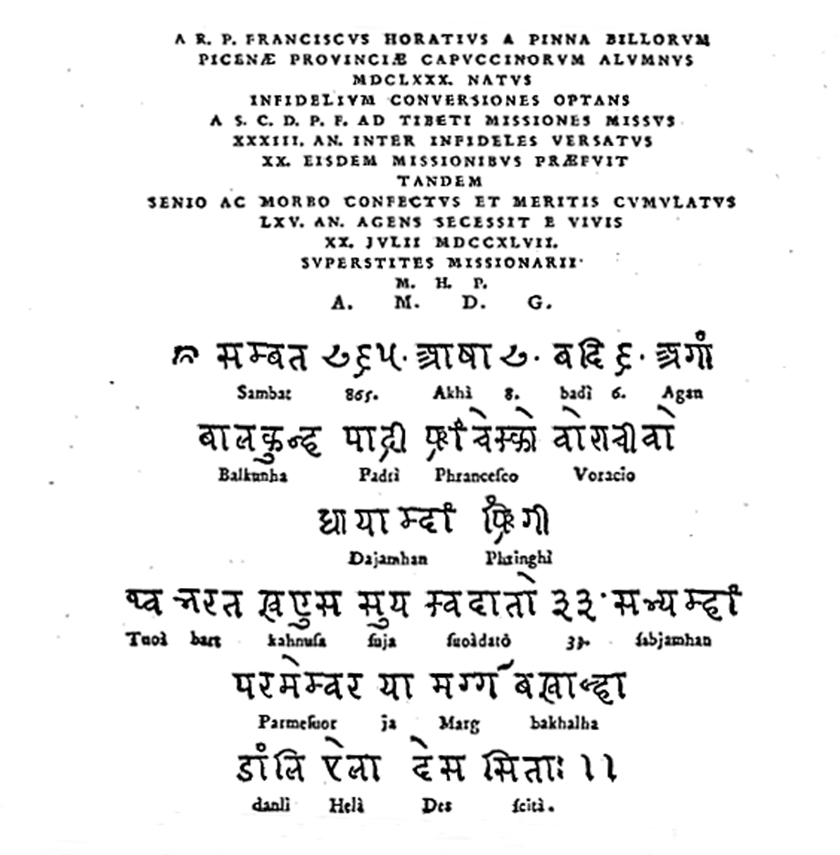
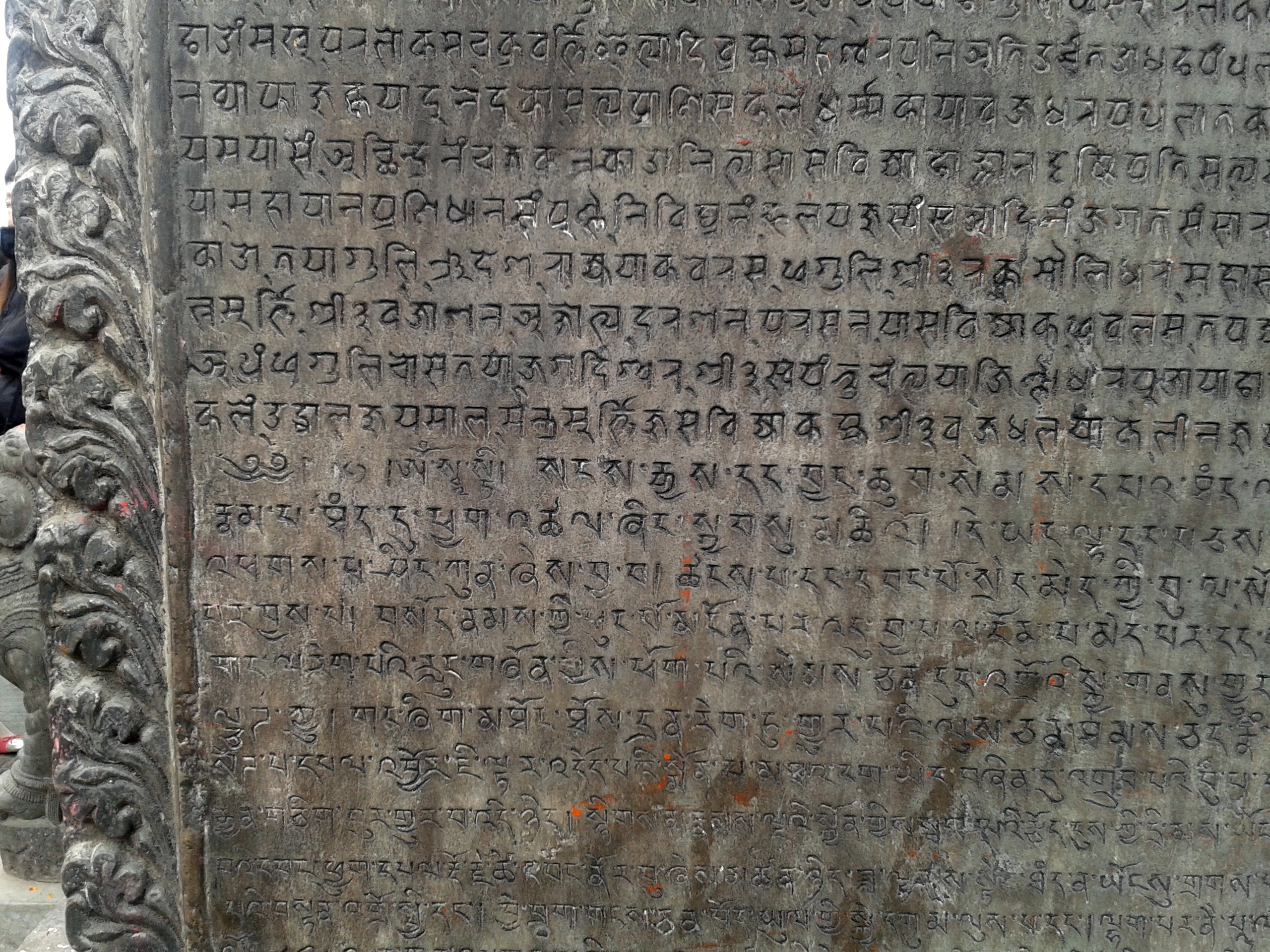
Multilingual inscriptions. Clockwise from upper left: 15 languages inscription at Kathmandu Durbar Square, an epitaph in Latin and Newar in Patan, a Newar and Tibetan inscription at Swayambhunath.

Among the thousands of Newar language inscriptions scattered across Nepal Mandala, or the Kathmandu Valley and its surrounding regions, there are also several multilingual inscriptions. The Pashupatinath Temple contains a Sanskrit and Newar language inscription of a South Indian Brahmin named Kṛṣṇa Bhaṭṭa, which records a donation to the temple and is dated to 1402 CE. Similarly, the Rajrajeshwari Temple contains an inscription by Devarāja Bhaṭṭa dated to 1408 CE in Sanskrit and Newar.

King Pratap Malla's polyglot inscription dated Nepal Era 774 (1654 CE) at Kathmandu Durbar Square is an example of his linguistic interest. The massive stone with spouts to dispense water to travelers is carved in 15 languages including Greek, French and Persian. Another famed stone inscription of Pratap Malla installed at the Rani Pokhari pond contains writings in three languages: Sanskrit, Nepali and Nepalbhasa. It is dated Nepal Era 790 (1670 CE) and describes the construction of Rani Pokhari and its religious significance.

In Bhaktapur’s Jangam Math, an inscription by Channaviradeva dated to 1699 CE is written in Kannada and Newar language. A large stone inscription containing texts in Newar and Tibetan is installed at the Swayambhu stupa complex. It records the renovation of the stupa during the years 1751-1758. The epitaph on the tombstone of a Capuchin missionary named Francesco della Penna, who died and was buried in Patan in 1745, contains texts in Latin and Newar.

== Gallery ==
Inscription at Changu Narayan Temple, Gupta script

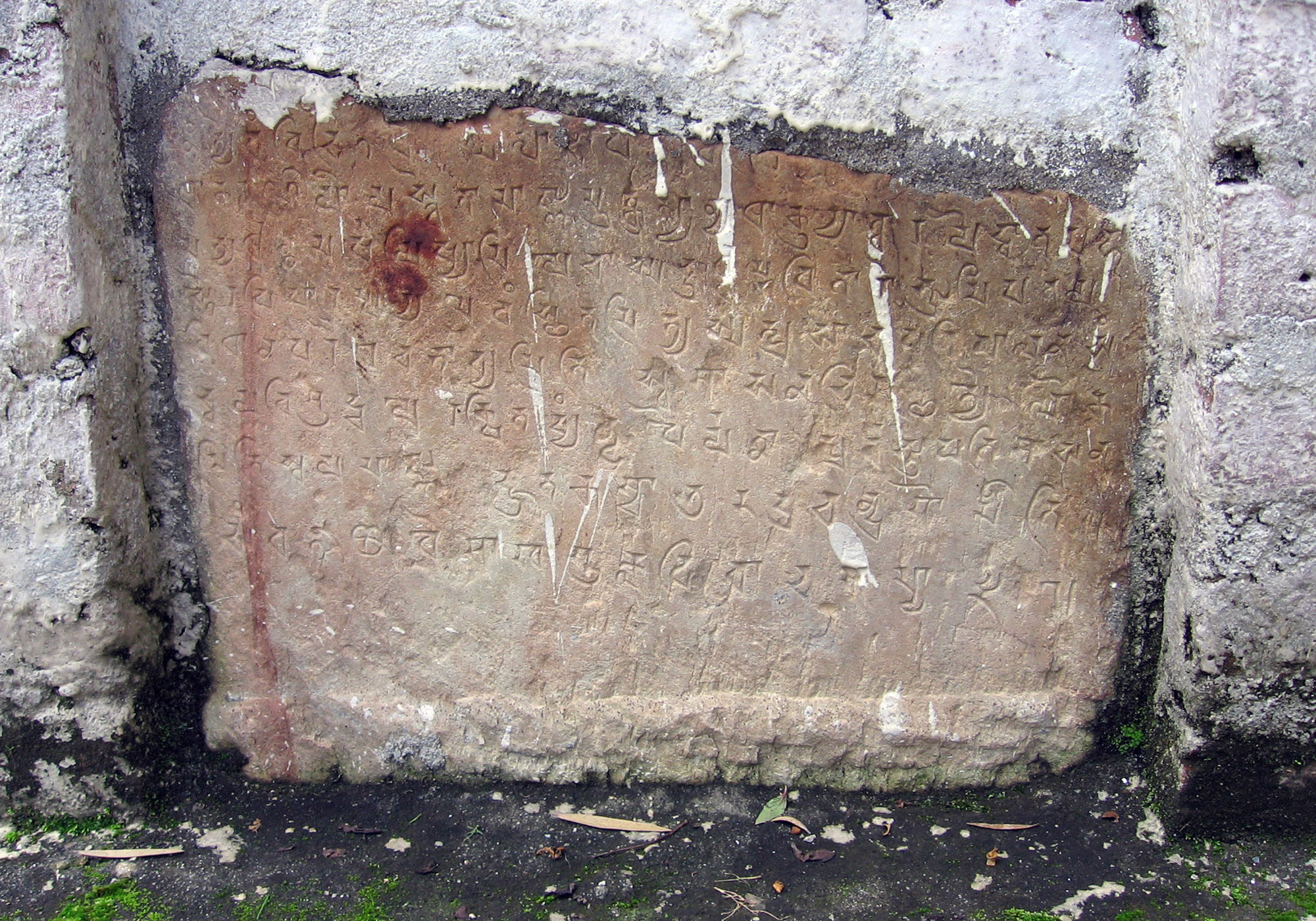
Inscription at Balambu, Kutila script

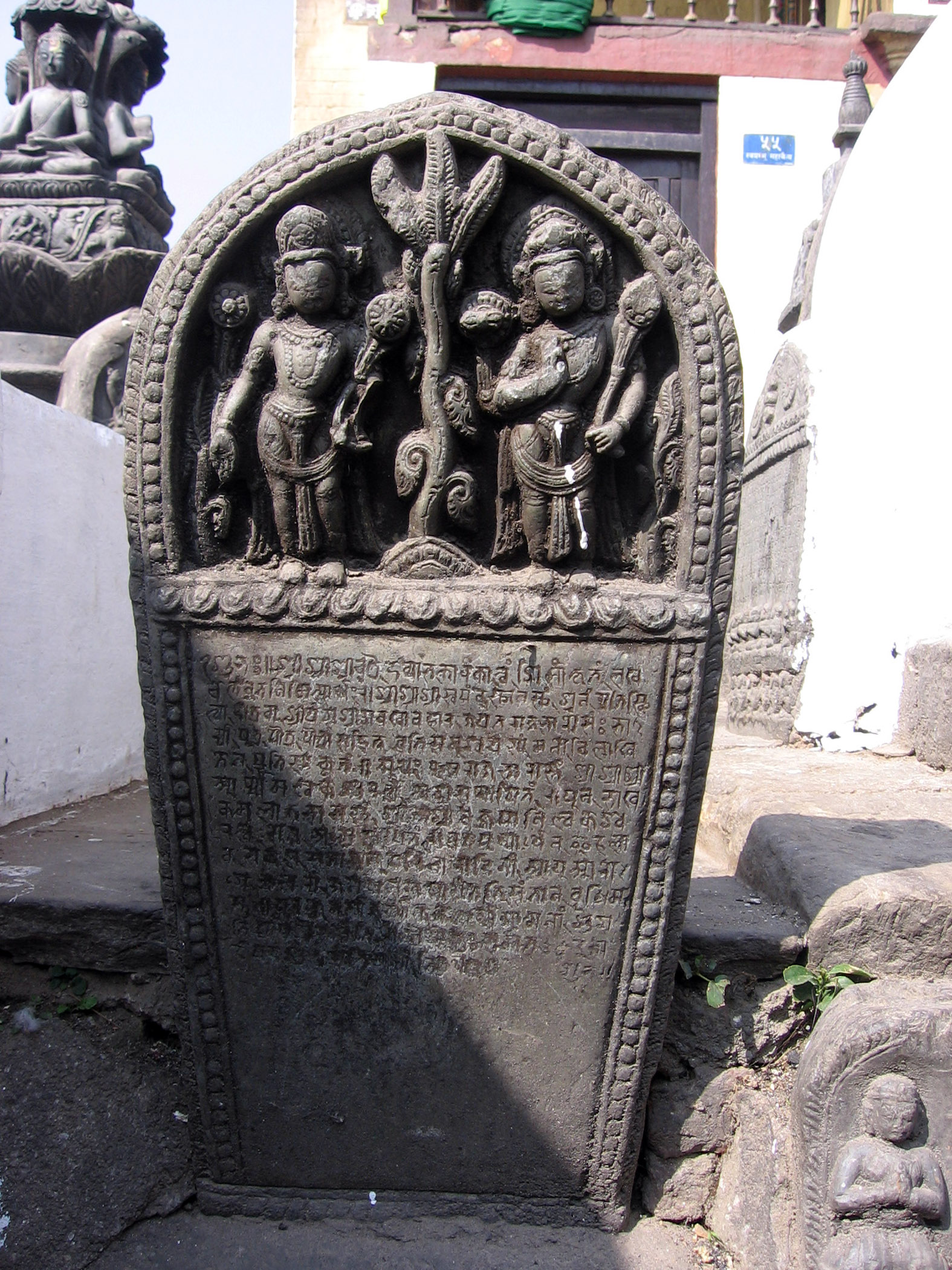
Inscription at Swayambhu, Newar script

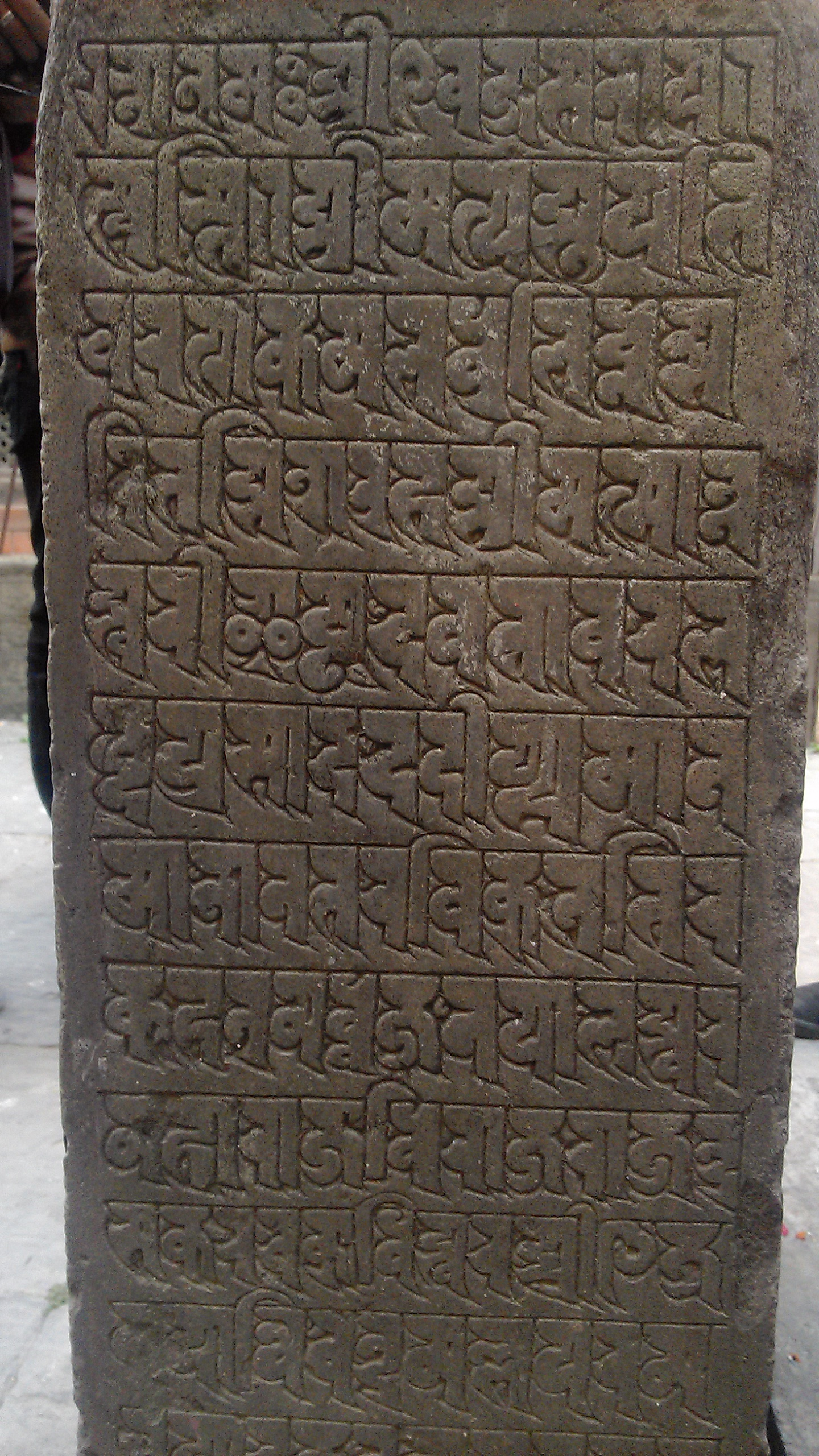
Inscription at Lagan Bahal, Ranjana script

Inscription at Rajrajeshwari Temple, Newar script and Grantha script, 1408 CE

Swayambhu inscription of Pratap Malla, 1655 CE

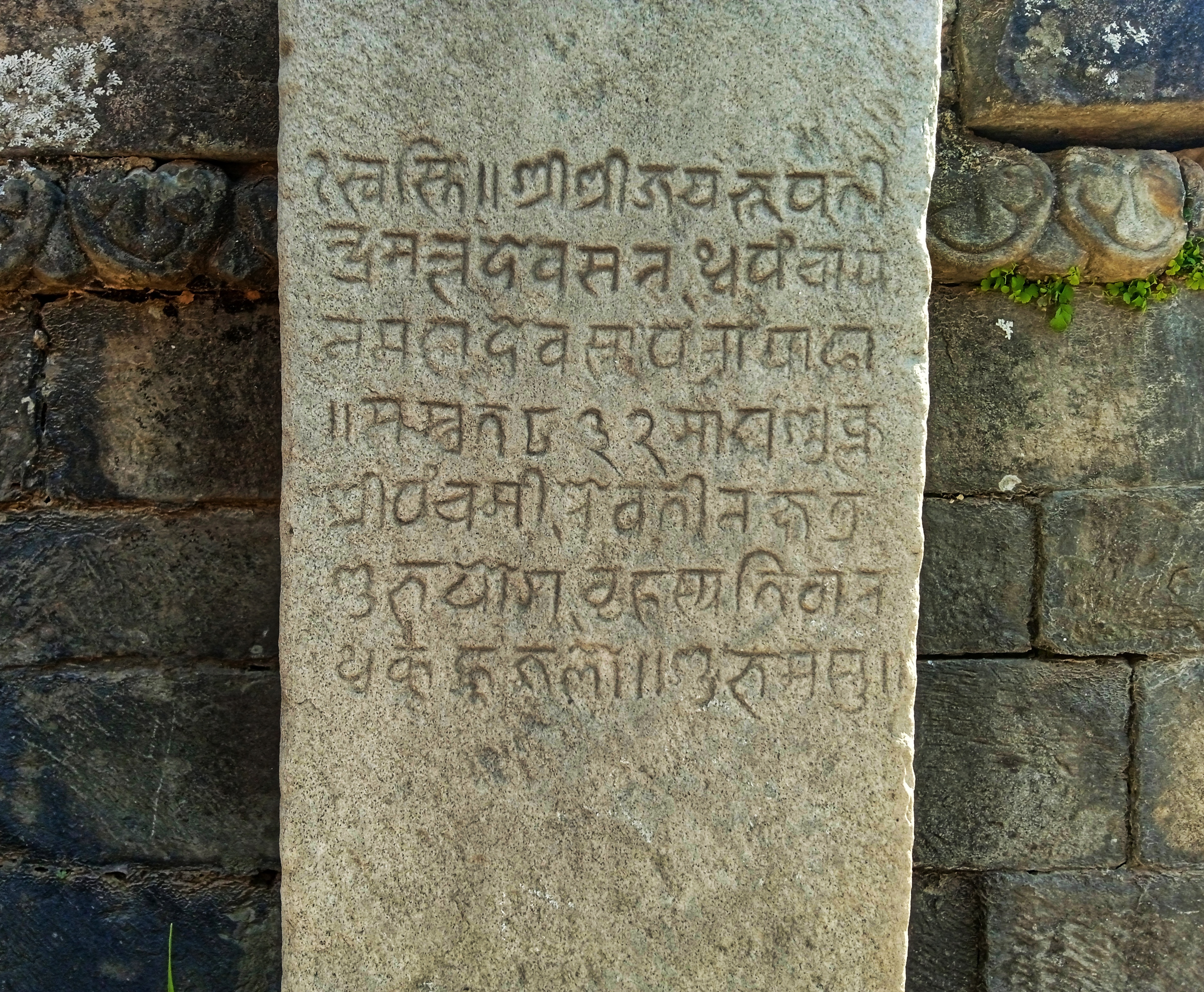
Inscription of Bhupatindra Malla, 1713 CE

Inscription of Bam Bahadur Rana in Nepali and Nepalbhasa, 1850 CE

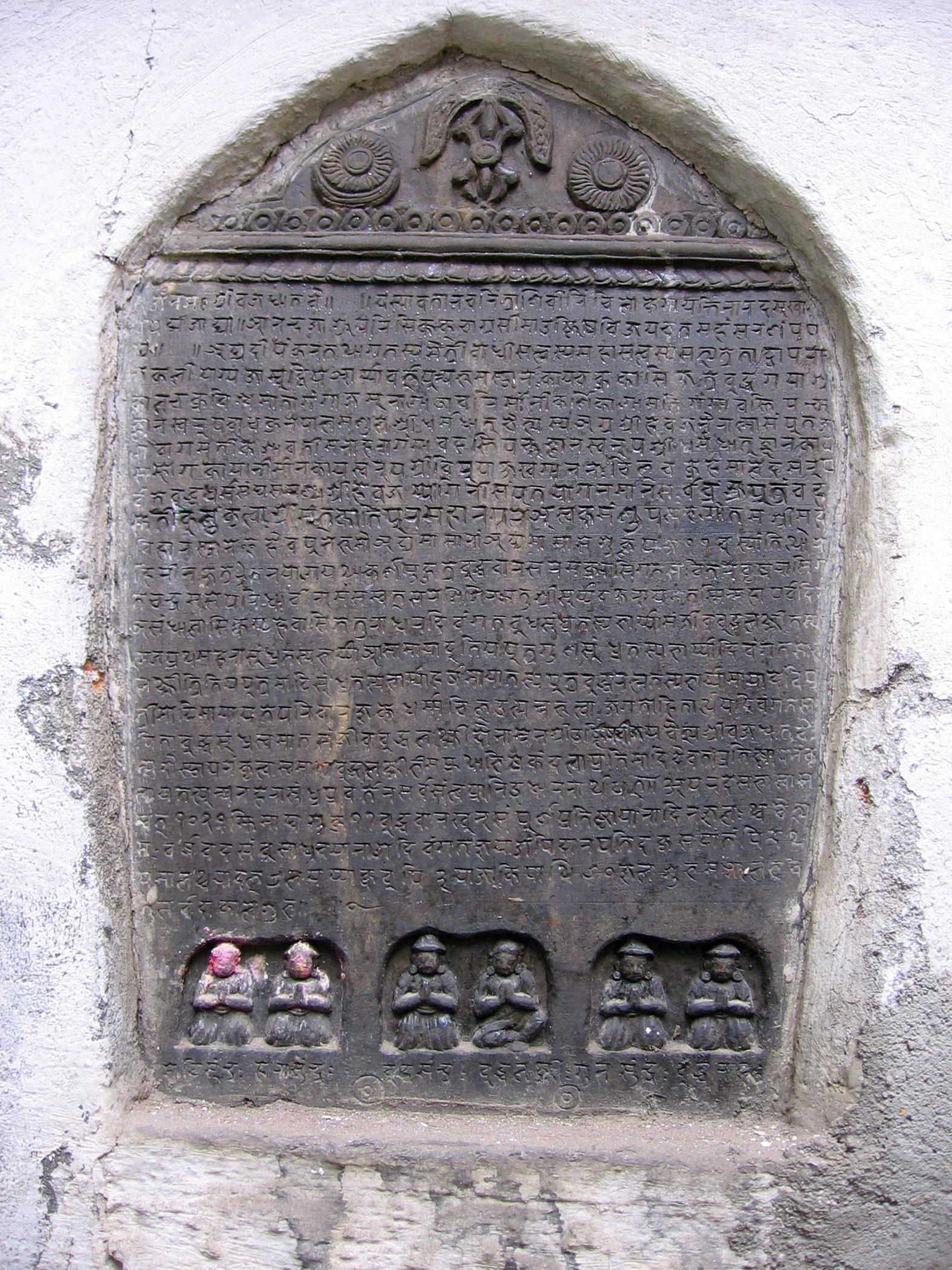
Inscription at Dhalasikwa, 1901 CE

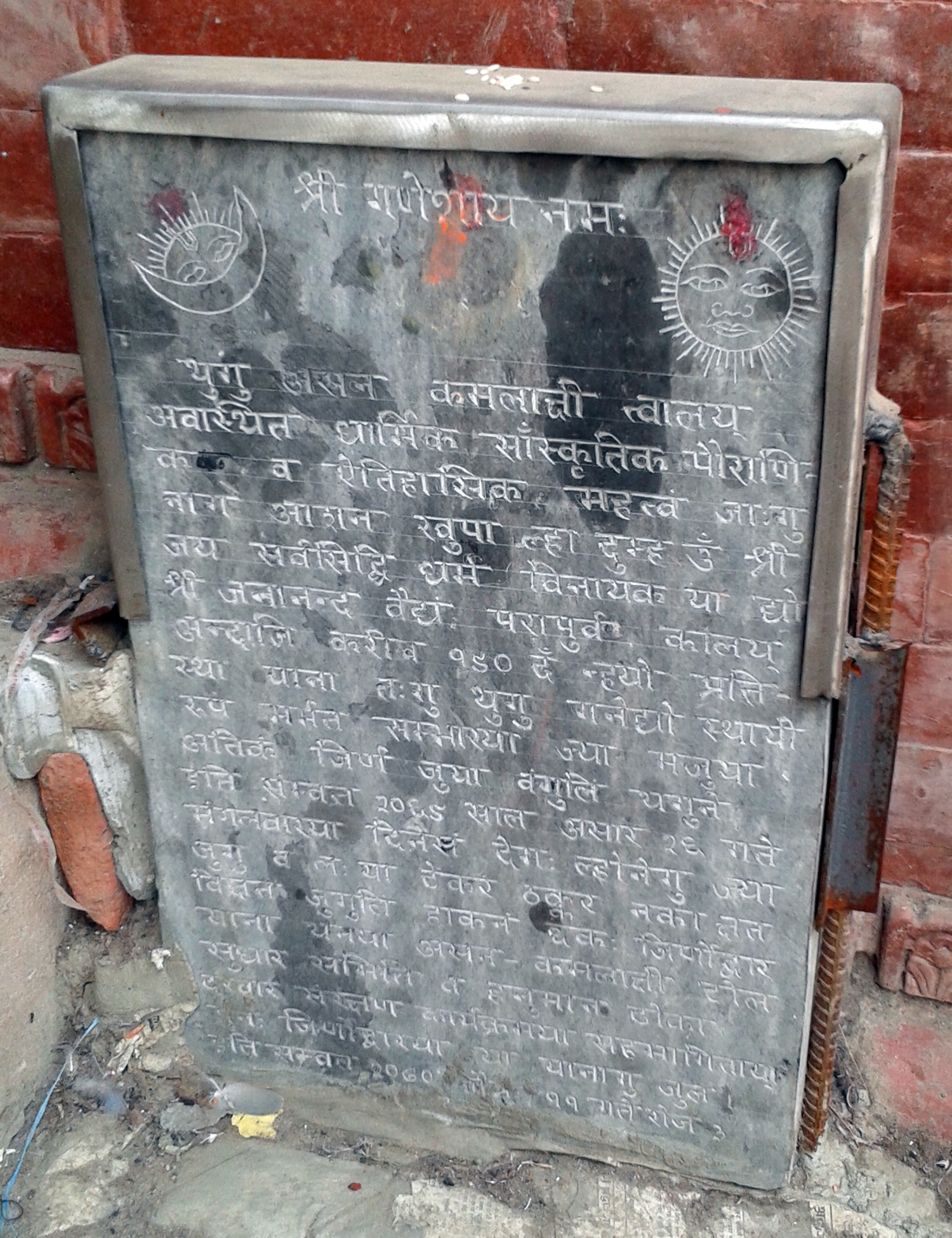
Inscription at Kamalachhi, dated 25 March 2014
