= Children's Art Museum of Nepal =

Museum in Kathmandu, Nepal

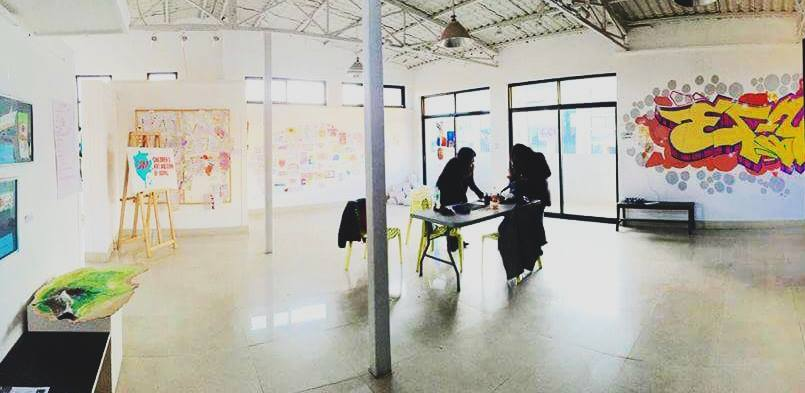
- Exhibition Room
- Established: June 18, 2014
- Founder: Sneha Shrestha
- Type: Art Museum
- Location: Hattisar, Kathmandu, Nepal
- Coordinates: 27.711002°N 85.322107°E
- Program Coordinator: Pranjali Singh
- Formerly called: Nepal Children's Art Museum (NCAM)

Children’s Art Museum of Nepal (CAMON), also known as Nepal Children's Art Museum (NCAM), is a creative space designed for children and youth. Its objective is to bring literacy through art to children and empower the youth. It is located in Kathmandu, Nepal. It was established in 2014.

== Location ==
It is located northeast of the Durbar Marg street, in Kathmandu. The foundation is situated at the top of a 5-storeyed commercial building in the heart of Kathmandu.

== Founder of Children's Art Museum of Nepal ==
The Founder-president Sneha Shrestha (artist), a graduate of Gettysburg College with a major in studio art and globalization studies, was awarded an Advanced Leaders Fellowship from World Learning. After graduation, she moved to Boston and was hired at Artists for Humanity as the Mentoring Artist in Painting and Education Coordinator. Shrestha’s grant required a time frame of six months, however, she changed her original plan of renting a space into building a permanent one, making her project sustain longer. As part of the fellowship, her social innovation project was CAMON which aims to "encourage children's appreciation of their culture and promotes self-expression through hands-on art experience".

== Mission ==
- To establish itself as an institution and resource for art and education in Nepal.
- To provide children and youth with creative and educational outlets for expressing themselves.
- To include art as part of children’s education in schools.

== Interior Design ==
The art museum houses two rooms, the Exhibition Room and the Education Room, inside a 1,200 sq. foot rooftop space. The Exhibition Room displays art that were produced in regularly scheduled museum workshops by Nepali students. It also displays art by local artists, international collaborators. The space is used as a miniature art gallery as well as an impromptu workshop. The Education Room houses a mini library and serves as the center of activity or the creativity lab. The room also includes a workshop stocked with art supplies. The rooftop has been crafted into a small living space, called the “Cloud” and is used for artist residency.

== Programs/ Activities ==
According to CAMON's Program Coordinator Pranjali Singh, children explore without direction however, "most activities tackle specific social issues". Starting 2013, even before the official establishment of the museum, Shrestha and her team conducted various activities under CAMON’s Community Outreach Program which started in June. Programs include an alphabet workshop where kids are taught to learn and appreciate the uniqueness of the Nepali alphabet, winter art camp and a “Wall of Hope” mural for the Half the Sky Film and Art Festival organized by Human Rights Film Focus Nepal in November. Moreover, the CAM team also known as the CAM crew carried out multitude of creative murals throughout Kathmandu.

== See also ==
- List of museums in Nepal

== Funds/ Grants ==
The museum is majorly funded by its Indiegogo campaign which raised $5,795 of its $9,200 goal by the end of October 7, 2013. It is partially funded by a $10,000 grant received by the founder from the Advanced Leaders Fellowship.
