= Pujarimath Museum =

Museum in Bhaktapur, Nepal

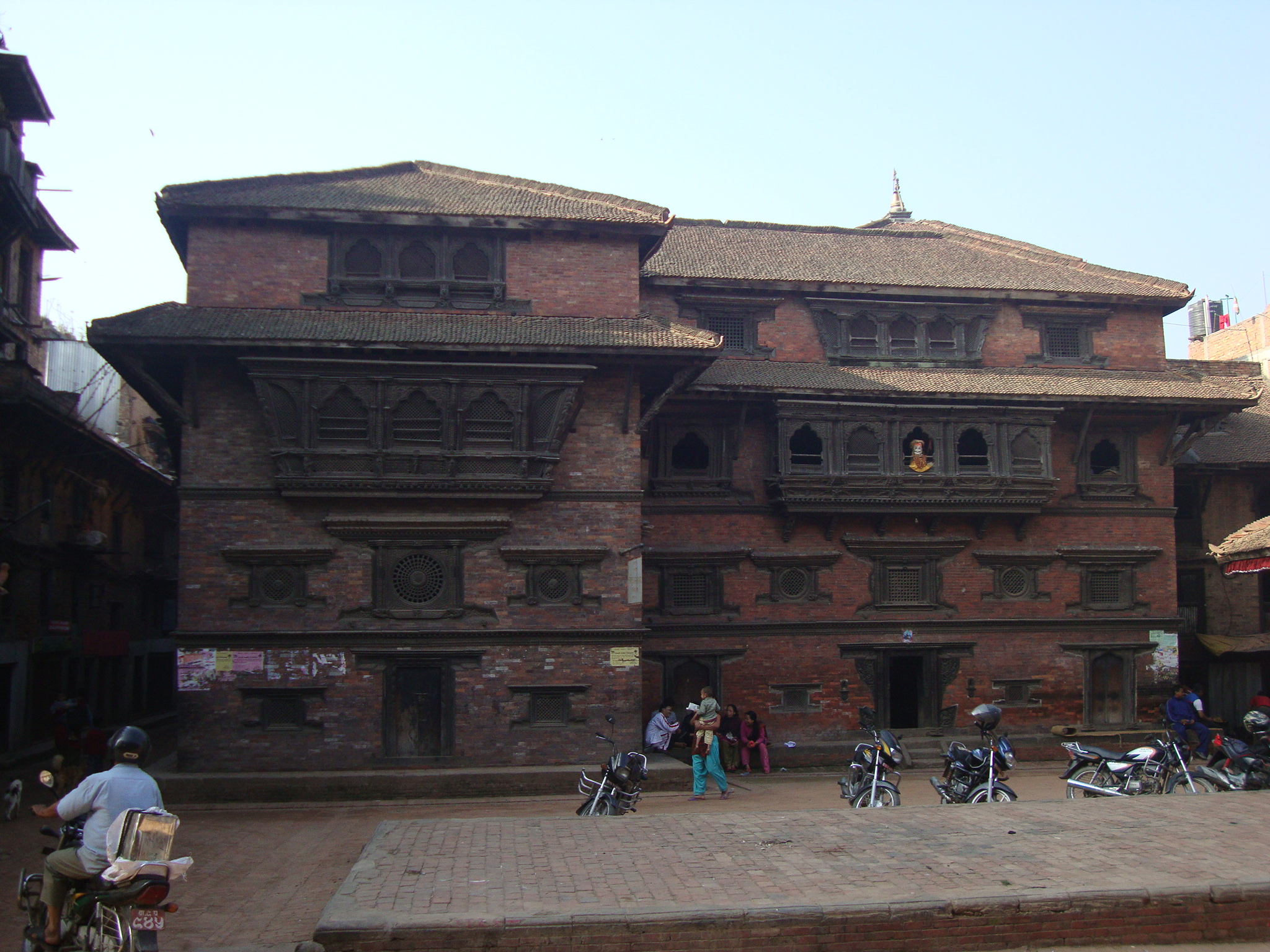
Bhaktapur Museum

The Pujarimath Museum (also spelled Pujari Math) is a museum located in Bhaktapur, Nepal. The Matha was constructed in the 15th century and rebuilt in 1763.

== See also ==
- List of museums in Nepal
