= Natural History Museum of Nepal =

Natural History Museum of Nepal Tribhuvan University प्राकृतिक विज्ञान संग्रहालय नेपाल
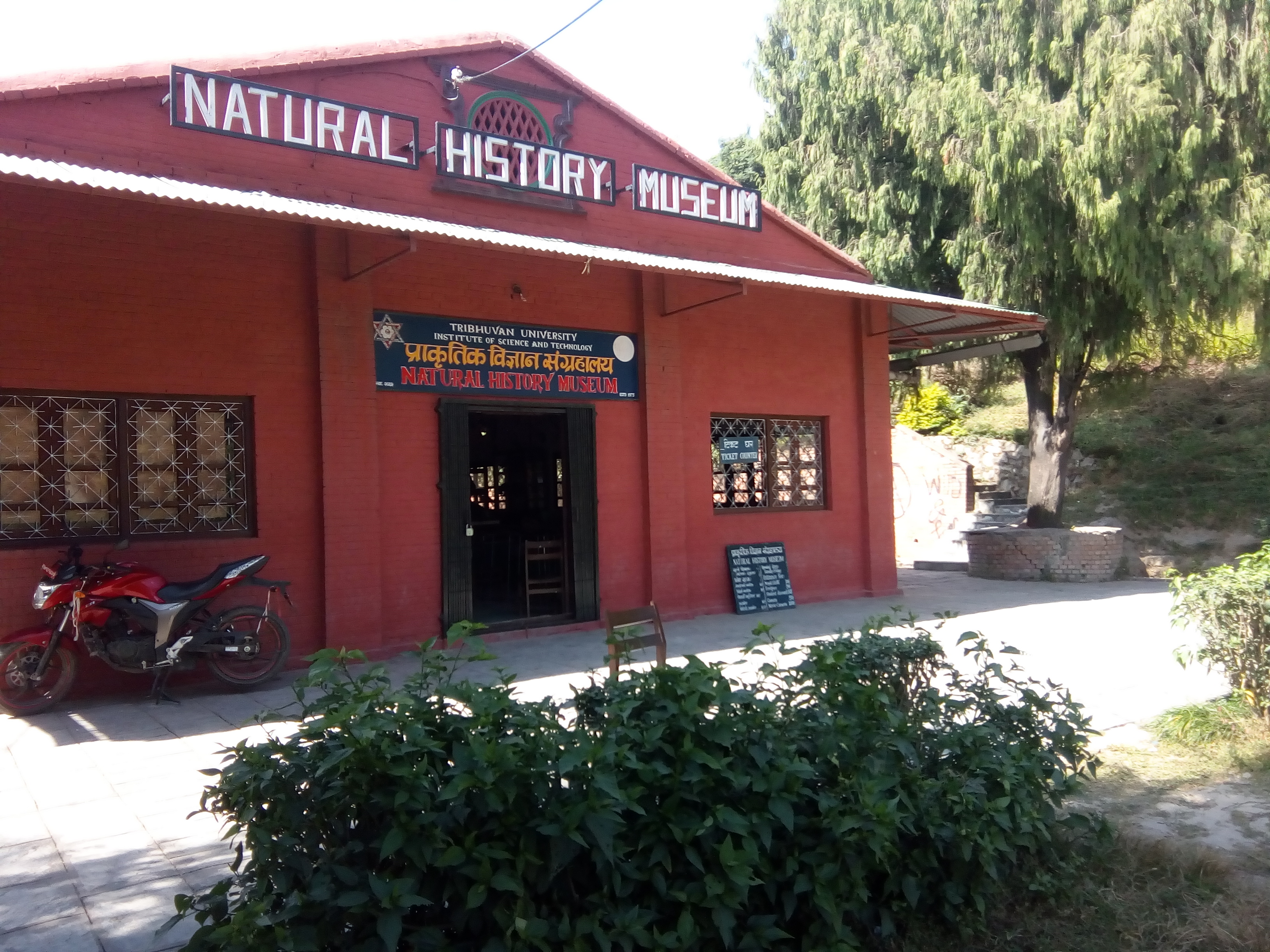

- location in Nepal Map, Natural History Museum, Swayambhu, Kathmandu
- Established: 1975
- Location: Swayambhunath, Kathmandu, Nepal
- Coordinates: 27.7146°N 85.2878°E
- Type: Natural history museum
- Website: http://nhmnepal.edu.np

The Natural History Museum of Nepal (Nepali: प्राकृतिक विज्ञान संग्रहालय नेपाल, romanized: Prākr̥tika Vigyan Saṅgrahālaya Nēpāla) is located near the World Heritage Site of Swayambhunath. The museum was established in 1975. Since then the museum has collected 50,000 specimens of Nepal’s flora, fauna, and funga.

== Journal of Natural History Museum ==
The Natural History Museum of Nepal has been publishing a journal annually since 1977. The journal, entitled the Journal of Natural History Museum, is the oldest journal on nature in Nepal. The museum has also published numerous books and field guides on Nepal's wildlife.

== Specimens ==
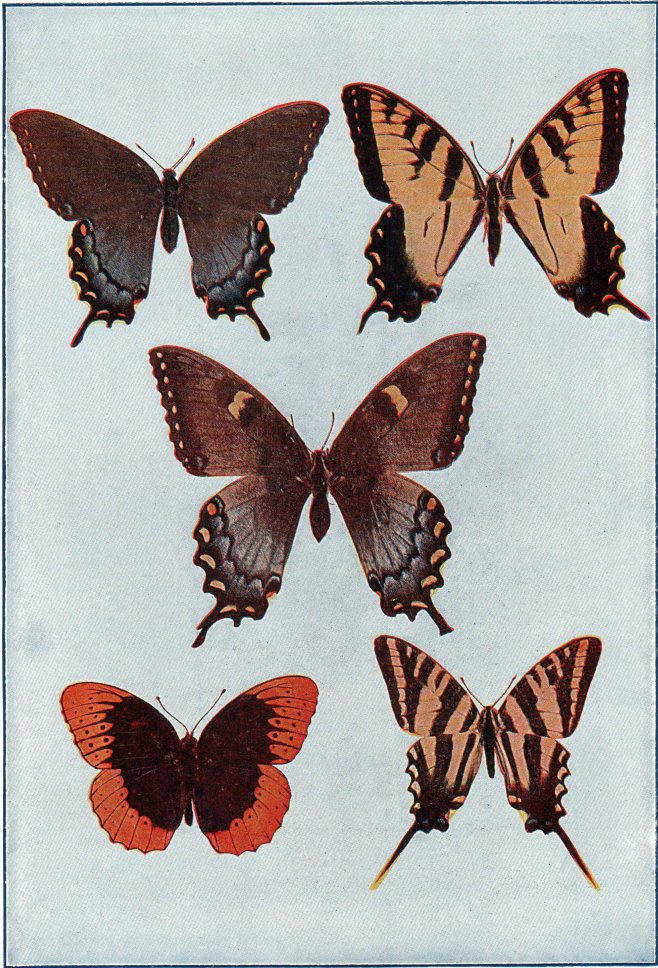
A collection of butterflies on display

The museum's large specimen collection reflects Nepal's bio-diversity. It houses some 14,800 butterfly and moths specimens; 4,140 beetle specimens; 1,450 dragonfly specimens, and over 1,600 specimens of other insects.

The museum also has 6 specimens of lower chordates, 890 of fish, 107 amphibians specimens, 390 of reptiles and 1,194 of birds. The museum's mammalian specimens total 225, and it also has 22 specimens of skeletons, besides 964 fossils and animal body parts. The museum also houses 107 models of plastic-clay and 74 of rock and minerals. The museum's botanical and mycological collection: algae (124), fungi and mushrooms (2,320), lichens (61), bryophytes (1,124), pteridophytes (507), gymnosperms (163), and angiosperms (5,034).

The museum also has a specimen of the spiny babbler, Nepal's only endemic bird species. A specimen of the golden pheasant, an exotic bird from China, is also on display.

Also on display is a specimen of the Atlas moth, the largest moth species in the world.

=== Specimens of extinct species ===
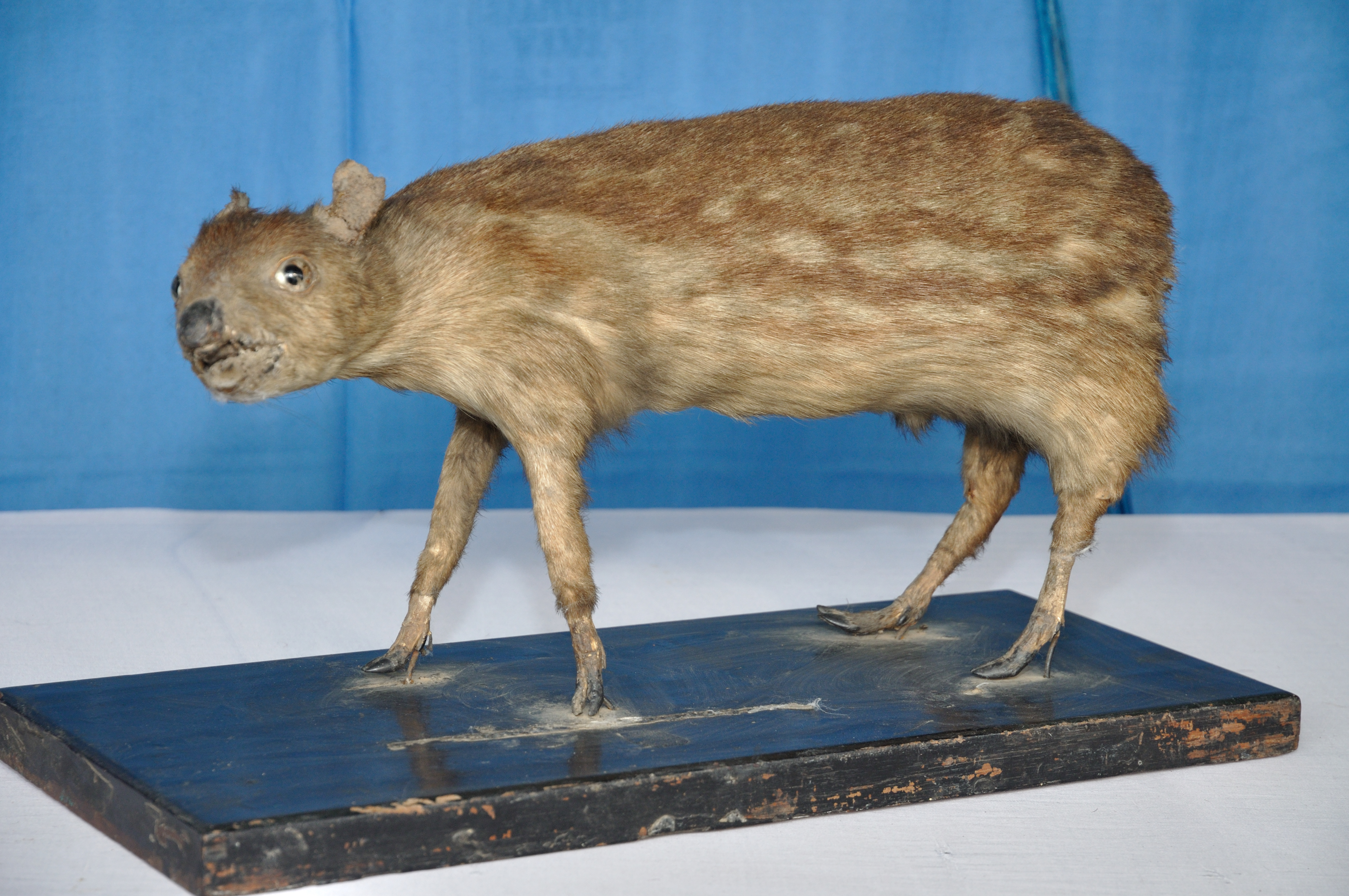
A taxidermied mouse deer

The museum is now the only place to see a specimen of the mouse deer (Indian chevrotain), which is believed to be extinct in Nepal.

=== Strange specimens ===
The museum has some bizarre specimens, among them an eight-legged embryo of a goat, a four-legged chick, and a two-headed snake.

=== Fossils ===
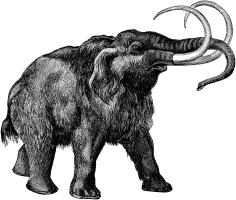
A wooly mammoth relative of the Archidiskodon

The museum also some relics from the country's prehistoric times. There is a fossilized skull of the Archidiskodon, a species of elephant that roamed the Sivalik Hills of Nepal. Another ancient specimen is the molar teeth of Sivapithecus, a hominoid. The skull and the teeth are believed to be from around 3 million years and 8-10 million years old respectively.

Rare and Threatened Species

The museum also has specimens of rare and threatened species of fauna. Giant hornbill, Green -breasted Pitta, Pelican, Flamingo, Painted Stroke, Black -Crowned Night Heron, Brown-wood owl, Crested Serpent Eagle are some of these bird specimens. Endangered species such as Panthera tigrina and Manis pentadactyla (Chinese pangolin) are also kept here.

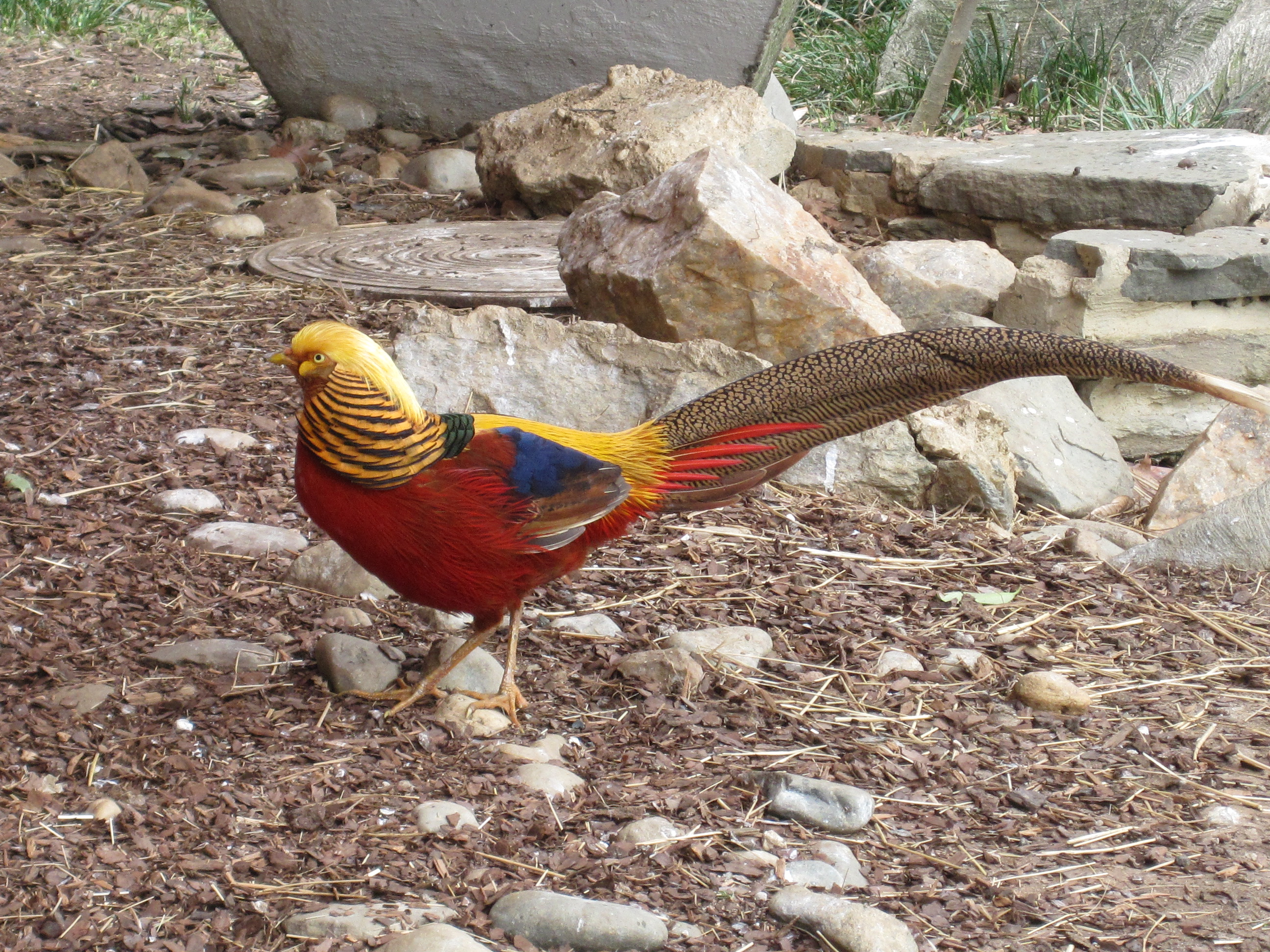
Male golden pheasant

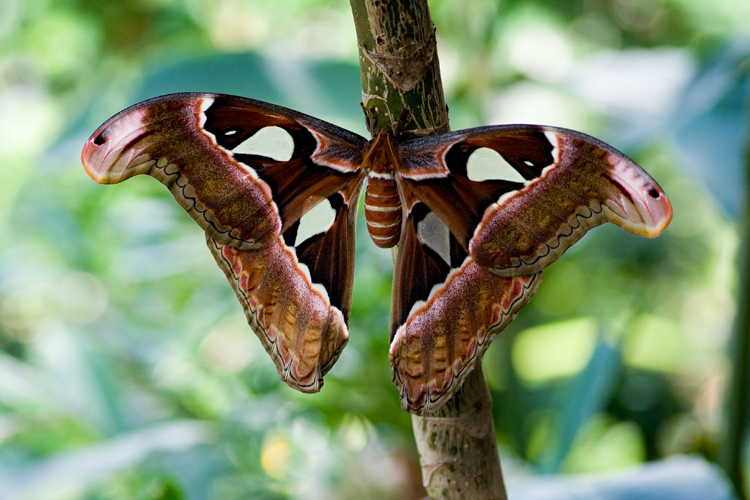
Atlas moth

== See also ==
- List of museums in Nepal
