= Kapilvastu Museum =

Kapilvastu Museum of Nepal
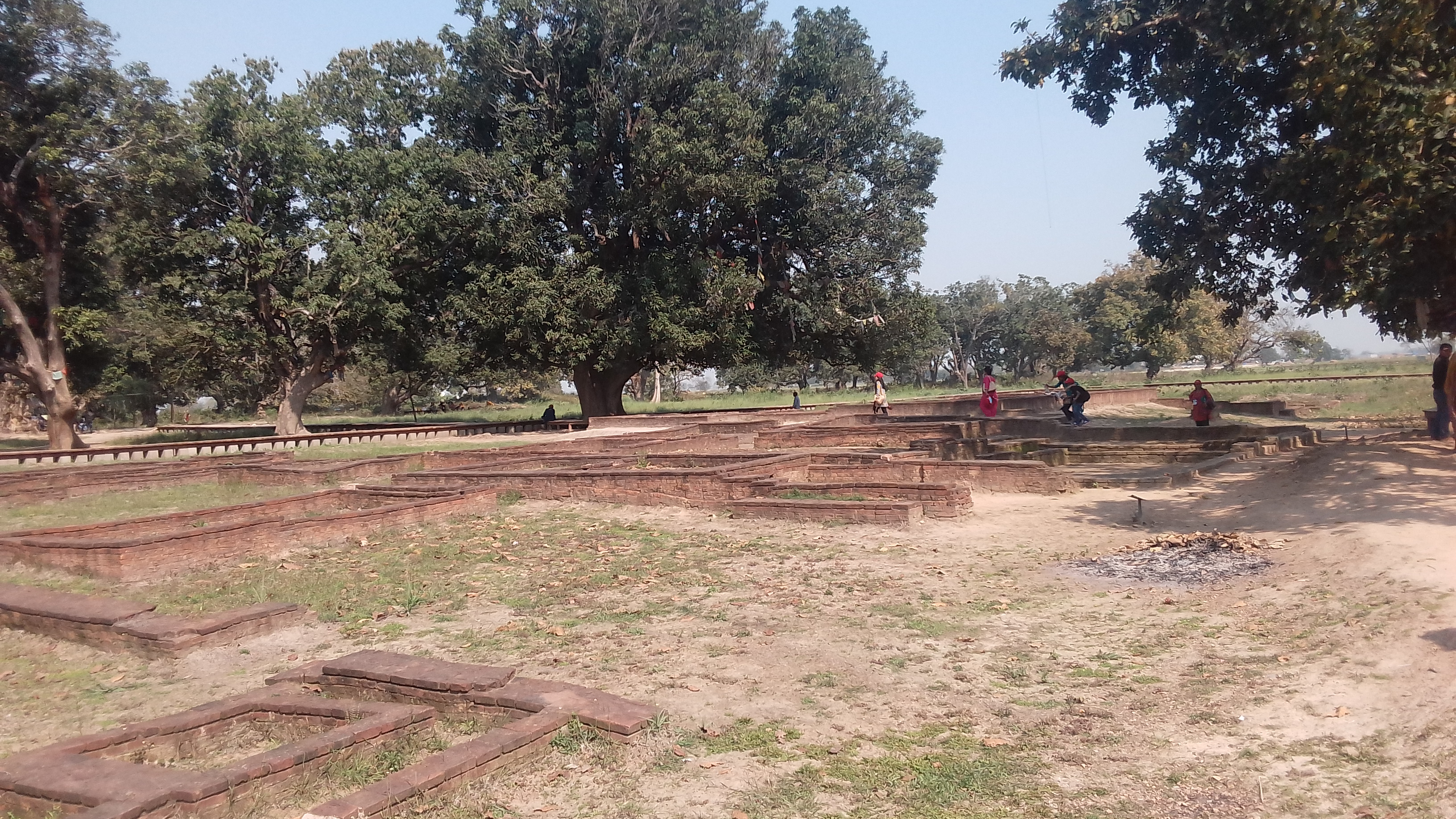
- Tilaurakot, Ancient capital of the Shakyas
- Established: 1962 (Taulihawa, Moved to Tilaurakot in 1985)
- Location: Tilaurakot, Nepal
- Type: Archaeological museum
- Director: Subash Krishna Dangol
- Curator: Subash Krishna Dangol

Kapilavastu Museum is a cultural and religious museum in Tilaurakot, Nepal. Kapilavastu is the ancient city of the Sakyas, Sakyamuni Buddha son of Suddhodhan. There are more than 136 archaeological sites in the territory of ancient Kapilavastu. Tilaurākoṭ, Niglihawa, Gotihawa, Arorakot, Sisahaniyakot, Chhetradehi, Sagrahawa, and Pipari, etc. are enriched with ancient art remains and monuments that are discovered. Archaeological findings of Tilaurākoṭ and of other sites are kept in the Kapilavastu Museum.

The museum is operated under the Department of Archaeology of the Nepāl Government. This museum was established in 1962 located on the right bank of the Banaganga River and the western site of Tilaurākoṭ mound. The catalog of displayed objects includes terracotta human figurines, animal figurines, birds, seal and sealing, beads, bangles, dabber, flesh rubber, coins, musical instruments, and Chalcolithic objects of Mustang Chhokhopani cave. Copper rings, weapons, painted grey ware pieces, conch and bone balls, teeth of hair, shoulder bone, finger bone, and leg bone are also displayed here.

== Pottery ==
Pottery from the excavated and explored–sites help researchers understand the basic cultural components of the various periods of human occupation. In the course of excavation at Tilaurākoṭ, Bañjarāhī, Lumbinī, Rāmagrāma, and Paisiā, excavators discovered clear-cut sequences of cultures beginning from painted grey ware phase to the period of Imperial Guptas. Some of the ancient mounds yielded fragments of P.G. ware, N.B.P. ware, and Red ware from the surface. Vedmau is specially enriched with fragments of painted grey ware, which is called a Vedic site by the local people. The ceramic tradition of this region is similar to the one at Hastināpur from period II to IV. Thus, the archaeologists rightly compared the chronology and ceramic tradition of the area with that of Hastināpur. The most characteristic shape in greyware is a dish with convex sides and beaked edges. The pottery is thick in section having horizontal and vertical bands. The clay used was well-levigated. A metallic sound is produced by the fragments of greyware when struck. Northern black polished ware is thin and perfect in treatment. The clay used is not so well levigated and well-baked as in the case of greyware. It carries black and silver shades. These two phases are comparable to the periods II and III of Hastināpur, dated there in c.11-8th and c.6th-5th centuries BC respectively.

The red–slipped ware is abundant in quantity in the trenches as well as on the surface of the ancient mounds. Dishes, bowls, and basins are representative types of this ceramic tradition as well. Redware pottery and terracotta seals with Brāhmi scripts were found in the same layers. The quality of clay is very fine and is also well-fired.

== Painted Grey Ware ==
The P.G. ware is thicker in section and decorated with horizontal or vertical bands, criss-cross bands, and irregular dots over the grey surface with black pigments. Some of them are plain having shining on the surface.

Northern Black Polished Ware

North black polished ware was popular throughout the western Terai region of Nepāl succeeding the painted Grey ware. The treatment and finish of the ware looks perfect. The surface is usually coal-black and rarely steel-grey or silvery. In some cases, it has golden-brown patches. The core is either grey or reddish. The part immediately below the surface is generally dull red. NBP ware fragments are thin and well-baked and are made of good-quality clay. This region is completely dominated by the N.B.P ware, rather than the black polished ware, as is seen in the eastern parts of Uttar Pradesh in India. Fragments of black-polished ware are thinner in section and are not as perfect in treatment as NBP ware. Fragments of this ware are similar to that of the pottery of period III at Hastināpur. It is datable in c.6th-5th centuries B.C. Dishes, bowls, saucers, small basins, lids with tapering sides, small vases with different types of rims, and carinated handis are the representative types of this ceramic. There are deep or shallow bowls with convex, receding, or progressively widening sides, small basins with receding sides, lids with tapering sides, some with a projection for flanged vessels, and small vases with different types of rims.

Red ware

This type of ceramic is usually associated with the Mauryan Period. Some of the fragments in redware are painted in circular lines. In some cases, the black portion is so well merged with the red that it is difficult to find out the main feature. Mainly bowls, basins, and vases are reported. However, these shapes are not peculiar to this type alone. It is usually of medium fabric with some red slip on it. It is found at Bañjarāhī, Tilaurākoṭ, and Goṭihawā during excavations. From period I A at Bañjarāhī, smooth and heavy red wares with black wash, and heavy unslipped redware with coarse redware are reported to be common. Smooth and heavy red ware with black wash is wheel–turned and is not well-fired. It has several shapes, viz. lid, bowls, shallow plate, pot with an elongated body, basins, and convex-sided pots. Rimless bowls have either straight or slightly convex sides and a pointed edge. A single fragment of the small bowl is thick-sided with a beveled-in edge. Dishes are convex-sided with a slightly clubbed-out edge or pointed edge. Basins also have beaked-in edges. Heavy red ware with unslipped and roughened surface has a gritty core. All shapes are mostly utilitarian, viz. pots with high and straight or flared mouths and globular pots. Vessels representing coarse redware type were meant for everyday use, viz. pots with constricted necks and basins.

Red-slipped ware

Red-slipped ware represents identical types in several shapes. The simultaneous use of this ware and grey ware copiously for utensils of daily use in hundreds of contemporaneous sites of Northern India and the western Terai region of Nepāl suggest that both were manufactured in the immediate vicinity of the sites. These wares represent the particular significance of their utility as well as their social significance in contemporary society. This ware is reported from various mounds in the region. Stratified specimens are reported from Bañjarāhī and Tilaurākoṭ. From period I A at Bañjarāhī the red-slipped ware has a red core with a bright red slip on it. It is made of purer clay. There is a fragment of a high-necked pot with flared ends. The other fragment of a basin with a red wash on its surface and convex sides and a beaded out rim is also reported from this site.

Late Grey Ware

The ceramic industry of late greyware is distinguished by the mode of its firing. It has a medium-thick section like the one from period III. It is particularly characteristic of pottery in period IV of Hastināpur, where it is called late grey ware. The red and grey wares were manufactured in contemporaneous sites of Northern India and Nepālese Terai. Its core is generally ashy-grey and rarely blackish-grey. Most of the vessels were treated with a slip both internally and externally. The colour was either grey with shades varying from medium to dark grey or black. Some of the sherds bear bands, dots, and strokes in black. Dishes, bowls, and dining–plates are representative types of this ceramic. Bowls in this ware are as frequent as in the red ware and represent a wide variety of types. Mitra has recorded various types of this ware from Tilaurākoṭ. According to her these indifferently-painted pots found in association with the Northern Black Polished Ware cannot be assigned to a distinctly pre-NBP ware Phase. One has to carefully examine to determine the original colour of her findings because other excavators have discovered painted grey ware in the course of excavation at the same mound, assignable to period II at Hastināpur.

Chocolate-slipped Ware

The slip on the chocolate-slipped ware is of a better standard than the red-slipped ware. First of all this ware was discovered from period II at Bañjarāhī. It shows a reddish core with degraissant in the form of pieces of hay and fine sand. The original surface was brown-red on which chocolate slip was coated. Fragment of a vessel with a flared mouth internally carinated has also been found at the former site. It has a beaked edge

Black-slipped Ware

Being black-slipped or black-polished its polish and shine are not of perfect quality like that of the Northern black polished ware. Its colour seems to be greyish and not deep black. Dishes and bowls are representative types of this ceramic. Layers 1–4 at Tilaurākoṭ yielded mainly red wares and black-slipped grey ware of a coarse variety. Period IV of this site is related to the Suṅga and the first phase of the Kushāṇa periods. Period V, consisting of Layers 1–3, has also mainly yielded red ware and black-slipped grey ware of a coarse variety at Tilaurākoṭ.

Mauryan Figurines

A number of Mauryan figurines have been reported from Tilaurākoṭ. They are quite large and are characterised by smooth and sensitive modelling though only the face was moulded and the rest of the body was hand-made. Decorations were done with suitable clay bands made separately and added later over the body. Sometimes wooden pins have been used to decorate the body. The figurines have big eyes, a prominent nose, a slit mouth, and incised lines to mark hair. They are either red or smoky colours and are made of fine levigated clay. The ears are separately made with a heavy lump of clay shaped like ears with a pendent and applied over it. The left one is missing. The roundish face is worn out, however, it carries a dignified expression. There are big circular earrings and a flat band of a necklace. It belongs to the third century B.C. Such figures from North India are dated in the pre-Mauryan period by Coomarswamy, Zimmer^{,}, and Rowland. The other handsome figure from Tilaurākoṭ also represents the bust of a female. The face is ovalish and a bicornate headdress up to the shoulder is shown on it. The figure wears heavy earrings and a triple flat band necklace, and, the nose, eyes, mouth, and nostrils are indicated by incised lines and punctures. Rijal dates these two figurines pre-Mauryan period. However, the style and technique of the figure undoubtedly place it in the Mauryan period. The latter figurine is illustrated in the text published by Rissho University Japan.

Suṅga Figurines

The Mauryan and the Suṅga art do not appear to have any relation with each other so far as stone sculptures are concerned. However, in terracotta art there appears to be some relationships between the two. There was a sudden increase in the manufacture of terracotta art due to an important change in the technique and tradition of its production. Modeling was given up during this period. It was replaced by the molding technique, which was extensively used for the depiction of a variety of subjects. This change of technique was probably due to the heavy demand for terracotta art in contemporary society. Stone was a hard and scarce material. So, it was not a convenient medium for mass production. It was not available in plenty in most regions. Due to its dexterous quality, it could not be easily converted into figurines or plaques. However, it was easy to display sensitive features of the body in clay by subtle modeling. The plaques were produced from a single mold, and are, therefore, entirely flat without any decoration at the back. Some are produced in low flattened relief, while others come out with the background in fairly high relief. Some plaques are provided with holes at the top for hanging on the wall. In the course of time, the Suṅga artist produced fine pieces modeled in bold relief displaying disciplined sensitive modeling. They are of extremely fine fabric and are uniformly baked. They have a light darkish red colour, though some of them have a red slip on them. They have an elaborate headdress, beaded bands on the head, studs or disc-shaped earrings in their ears, and elaborate flat necklaces. Apart from these, they are heavily decorated with bangles anklets armlets, and broad bejewelled girdles on the waist. As a rule, the figures have heavy coiffure and wear elaborate apparel and jewelry concealing, to a certain extent, the beauty of the delicately modeled body. The female wears an extremely elaborate headdress and is loaded with jewelry, while the male wears a turban around his head. The plaques have decorative borders and the background is stamped with floral and rosette patterns. The treatment of the drapery is also varied.

Kushāṇa Figurines

A large number of big-size male and female heads, busts, and figures which usually betray crude workmanship have been found at different sites, especially from Tilaurākoṭ, Piprī, Lumbinī, and Sisahaniyā-Pandey. The specimens reflect that the artist did not use the mold, which was so commonly employed by the Suṅga artists. In some cases, a mold was occasionally used, particularly for producing large figures of which the busts were hand modeled, and only the heads were pressed out of the molds. The inferior quality of clay, mixed with grit, husk, and other impurities has been used to execute these Kushāṇa figurines. The eyes and mouth are wide open and the nose is long, pinched out by hand. The workmanship of this group is poorer than other Suṅga figurines found at the site.

The return of modeling forms does not seem to have been successful. According to Agrawal available specimens from the datable layers at Ahichchhatra are of crude workmanship, showing neglect in the use of mold and a reversal to hand-made form. A large quantity of figurines made in the same tradition of manufacturing is found in this region. Deterioration in terracotta figurines may have been due to the mass production of stone sculptures in contemporary society. Eyes, mouth, and nose are made with either incised lines or punched dots made with the help of bamboo or wooden pins. The female figurines have been bedecked with heavy ornaments, especially earrings, necklaces, and fan–like headgear. Mishra has classified these specimens into three groups: round and carved up to the feet, figures with oil lamps, and Negam type. However, his classification is not attested in this region probably due to a lack of sufficient specimens. These are classified into four groups on the basis of fragments and models available in this area.

Terracotta Figurines

Terracotta, being a cheap and popular medium and within the reach of the poor and common man, has been used not only as the medium for artistic expression but also for personal ornaments like beads, bangles and rings, seals and sealing, children's toys and objects of domestic and ritualistic needs. A large number of terracotta animals and bird figurines were undoubtedly children's toys. Terracotta plaques with holes at the top were suspended against the walls. Some of them were kept as decorating objects on the mantel-pieces or niches made on or in the walls of the houses. Flat, rectangular, oval, or round plaques could be made out of clay without any difficulty. Being a cheap and tractable medium it was highly demanded in contemporary society. It is largely concerned with the representation of the scenes of everyday life, and, as such, its social imports appear to be immense. Terracotta, in its varied uses and applications, gives us an idea for constructing the social, cultural, political, and religious life of contemporary people. Terracotta human and animal figurines give us a clear picture of the life-ways during the ancient period. The increase in communication between Northern India and the western Terai region of Nepāl resulted in the introduction of many classical elements of Indian art, the pattern of Nepālese culture, and art tradition. Terracotta figurines from Tilaurākoṭ, Lumbinī, Kudān, Bañjarāhi, Piprῑ, Kadzahawā, etc. have brought to light a large variety of terracotta remains, which throw considerable light on the trends of plastic art and nature of Nepāli artists during the pre-Christian and early Christian centuries. Tilaurākoṭ may be called a mine of such objects as it has yielded a very large number of terracotta human and animal figurines by which it is called a mine.

So far as the dating of the human figurines is concerned, scholars generally believe that hand–made figurines were made earlier than those produced with the help of a mold. However, this common belief does not find any favor in this region because the practice of both modeling and molding went hand in hand at one and the same time in some cases. However, many of the significant terracotta figurines, relevant for a study of this art, are simply accidental finds and no accurate data with regard to the level of their discovery are available. These specimens seem to have been disturbed from their original level due to some actions of men or of nature. Some terracotta figurines of different dates have been discovered in the same Pit. In the study of the terracotta art of this region, special attention has been taken to spell out its date, even if it could be ascribed to a particular piece on the basis of its context. Many of the excavating teams have not published their detailed excavation reports. In such cases, only illustrations and brief outlines are given in this study. Terracotta figurines have been classified on the basis of the variations in use, style, model, shape, and type.

Human Figurines

Both human and divine figurines reflect not only the socio–cultural, economic, and religious modes and thoughts of a community, but also delineate its artistic tradition. In the primitive stage of human civilization, many symbols as well as anthropomorphic forms had been used to express human emotions and spiritual feelings e.g. snake and mother goddess associated with the ritual of fertility or agriculture, a phenomenon common to all cultures. In the study of human figurines, many specimens as well as fragments are included which were found in the course of excavation, especially from Tilaurākoṭ. These figurines hardly reflect any characteristics peculiar to this region alone. Bearing the impression of the trends, tastes, and fashions of the artistic movements of the Mauryan, Suṅga, and Kushāṇa periods, most of them throw light on the common features of the contemporary terracotta art tradition of northern and eastern India. Latter among them were intended for house–decoration, a presumption substantiated by the suspension holes made in plaques found here.

The study of terracotta of the region leads one to divide them into two groups–one indicating a primitive form and experience and the other showing the impress and formulations of a stylistic advance natural to a progressive art movement in a chronological sequence. In form and technique, the former differs from the latter and the primitive type is also being fashioned out by the rural people even in the present day. Scholars have described these types as "ageless" in distinction to the second, which is designated as terracotta figurines with the "time variation ". The ageless type is characterized by modeling that reduces the form to a simple description of the main volumes of the figures corresponding to the principal parts of the body. These are fashioned entirely by hand by means of such rough and ready Devices as modeling the body, pinching up, and pressing down soft clay according to the requirements of the forms. Eyes, lips, ears, navel, hair, etc. are indicated either by incisions or by strips and pellets separately fashioned and applied on the modeled form. The applique technique is also adapted for delineating ornaments and headdresses. The human figurines of these groups have been reported from the Tilaurākoṭ area.

Mitra has reported such an ageless type figurine, which was purely hand–modeled and crudely fashioned, from the rampart filling at Tilaurākoṭ.

Animal Figurines

The terracotta animal figurines were produced in greater numbers than other figurines. A large number of terracotta animal and bird figurines were meant undoubtedly to be children's toys. Some of them might have been made by the family members of the artists. Toys were quite popular in this area during the ancient period. As recorded in Bhaddasāla Jātaka Prince Vidudabha questions his mother as to why he does not get gifts like horses, elephants, and toys which other princes were receiving from their maternal side. Among animal figurines, elephants, bulls, horses, rams, dogs, deer, and birds are found in larger proportion. Crude animal figurines when decorated become more realistic and beautiful. The artists show a preference for elephants. Animals are made of baked clay. One of them recovered from the excavation at Tilaurākoṭ seems to be carefully modeled by hand, possessing a solid body. Its ears and nostrils are marked by simple depressions. In making animal figurines, pinholes or applique pellets also serve the purpose of eyes. Anatomical details such as legs, trunk, tail, etc. have been realistically delineated in some examples. The first type of figurine is generally well-modeled and the favorite device for decorating the body of elephants was to cover them with circlets which were punched, stamped, pierced, or notched. However, in still more artistic figurines they stamped elegant chakras and leaves on the body and temples of the elephants. The second type of figurines, particularly the bulls, reflects skill and imagination in their modeling. The nostrils and the mouth are clearly marked by punctured dots and oblong incisions respectively. They are stamped with solar symbols, eight–spoked symbols, and four-spoked wheels. The third type of figurines, especially, horses present a longish neck sometimes with beaked faces. The eyes are diamond-shaped with a punctured dot or dash for pupils. Other specimens, viz. dog, deer, ram, and birds, are also modeled or molded in the usual tradition and technique in contemporary society. All the specimens are made of fine-grained clay. They are usually red in colour and fairly well-burnt, often with a grey core. Grey specimens and a few smoky-red figurines are treated with black slip. The terracotta figurines are classified into seven groups on the basis of the form of animals. The bull figurine seems to be ubiquitous in all cultural traditions, symbolizing as it did strength, virility, and agricultural productivity. N.B.P ware Phase is marked by a dominance of bull figurines among other animal figurines.

== See also ==
- List of museums in Nepal
