= Bronze and Brass Museum =

Museum in Bakhtapur, Nepal

The Bronze and Brass Museum is a museum located in Bhaktapur, Nepal.

== See also ==
- List of museums in Nepal
