= National Museum of Nepal =

This museum was kept in a large building built by Bhimsen Thapa

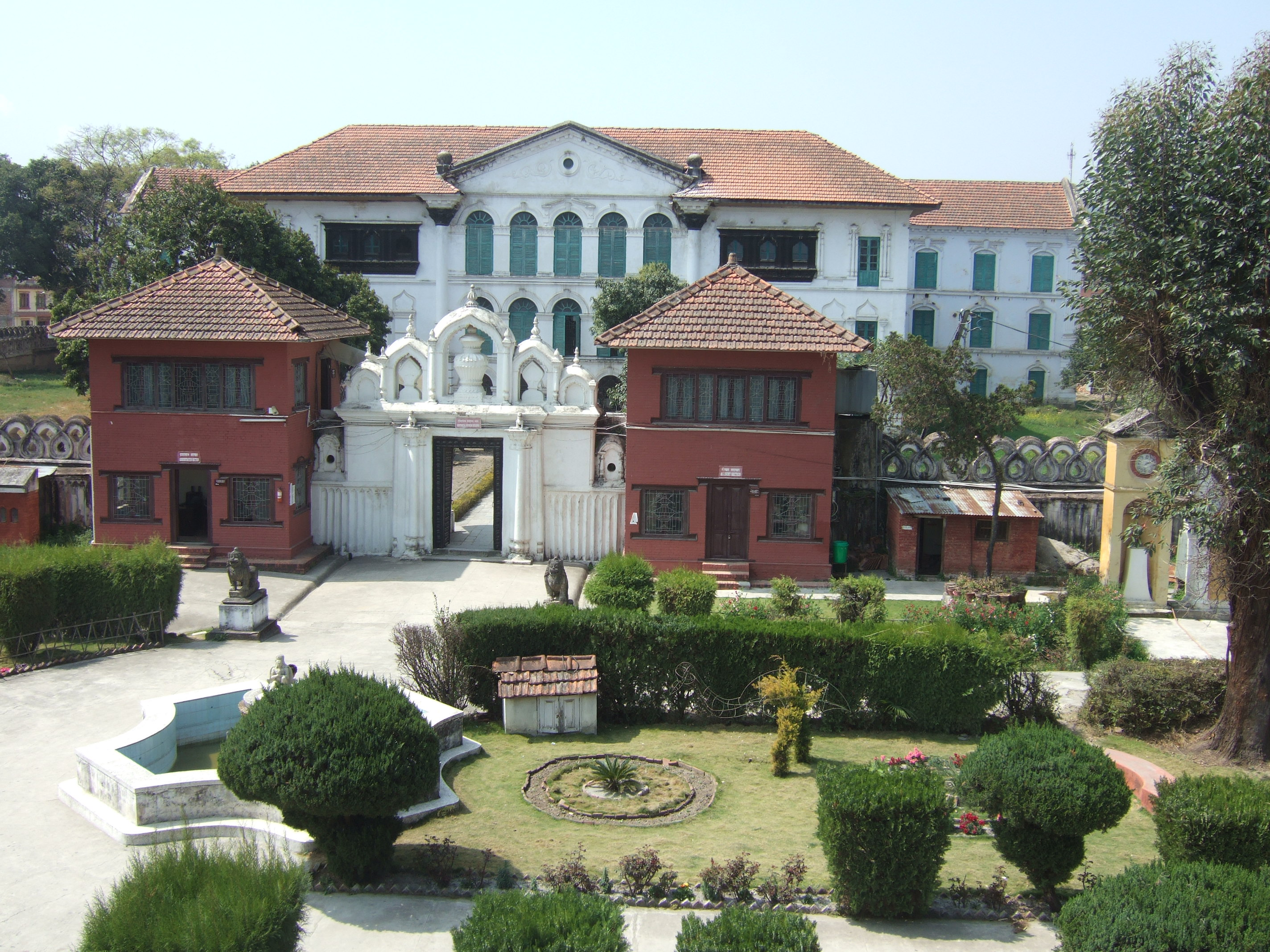

- location in Nepal Map, National Museum, Chhauni
- Established: 1928 AD
- Location: Chhauni, Kathmandu
- Coordinates: 27.7056°N 85.2890°E
- Type: History museum
- Website: www.nationalmuseum.gov.np

National Museum, located at the base of Swayambhu, a sacred hill in the Kathmandu Valley, is the first Nepalese museum. Covering an area of approximately 50 Ropani (27.38 hectares), the museum comprises various buildings, gardens, and open spaces within its premises. Its primary function is to preserve and exhibit rare and valuable art treasures.

== History ==
The museum has a rich history, initially serving as an Arsenal house constructed in 1824 by Prime Minister General Bhimsen Thapa. In 1926, Rana Prime Minister Chandra Shumsher added two wings to the north and south of the main building and renamed it Silkhana Museum. Later, in 1938, Rana Prime Minister Juddha Shumsher renamed it Nepal Museum and opened its doors to the public on February 12, 1939.

Initially, the buildings that house the National Museum were not intended for the storage, conservation, preservation, and display of art treasures. As the museum developed, it became challenging to manage in an appropriate manner. In response to this need, Prime Minister Juddha Shumsher established the Judhha Jatiya Kala Bhavan in front of the Nepal Museum in 1943. It was opened to the public on April 18, 1943.

In addition to this, the museum has an art section dedicated to the Buddhist collection, which was expanded with financial support from the Japanese government in 1997

Over time, the National Museum has undergone changes in its administrative system and management situation. Initially, from its establishment until 1951, it operated as a separate department of the government. From 1951, its administrative authority was transferred to the Ministry of Education under the leadership of a curator, which continued until 1962 A.D. Thereafter, the Department of Archaeology has been managing the museum.

As the museum has evolved, its name has also changed. It was originally known as the Arsenal Museum, which was transformed into the Nepal Museum in 1939 Later on, in 1968, it was renamed the National Museum, which remains popular to this day.

Currently, the museum's historical galleries, Judhhajatiya art galleries, and Buddhist art galleries offer services to visitors, including students, domestic and international tourists. Over time, it has become an important destination for those interested in art and history.

The museum also has an auditorium having a sitting capacity of 142 participants with a comfortable chair with a podium facilitated, a good audiovisual and lighting system. It complexes are provided with gardens and are also good for a day's outing for a family with children and spend a day in an academic tour and relaxation.

== Location ==
The National Museum of Nepal is in the city of Kathmandu at a short distance from the stupa. The classical building of the museum is on the Western side of the river Vishnu against a hilly background. Entering the museum, on the left is the Art Gallery displaying statues, wood carvings and paintings. The building straight ahead is the Buddhist Art Gallery displaying Buddhist art objects while the building on the right is the Museum of Natural History.

== Art Gallery ==
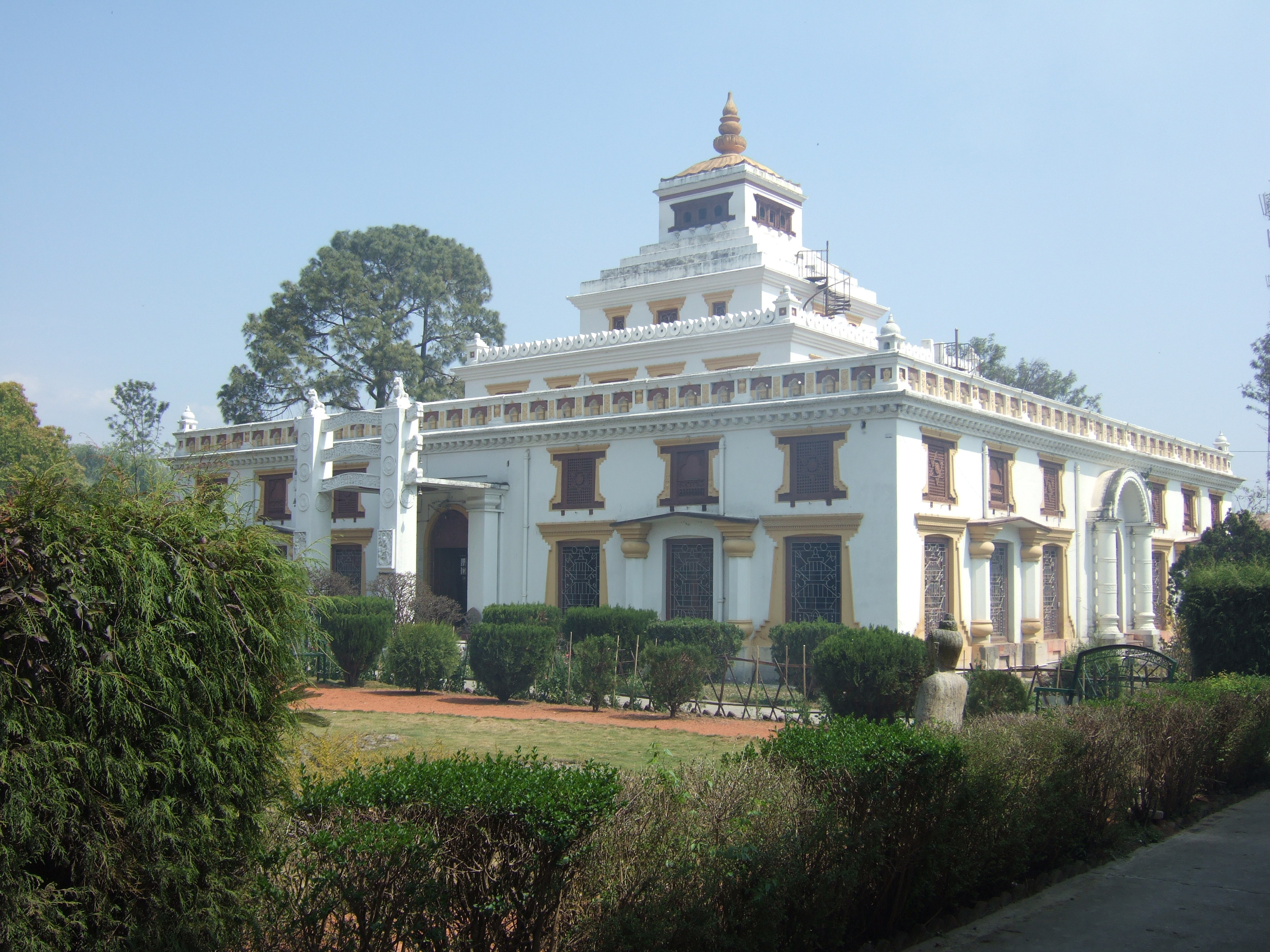
Kathmandu, National Museum:Art Gallery

The Art Gallery exhibits metal works, wood and stone carvings. Prominent among the stone images is the one of Licchavi King Jayavarma of the second century. This large statue found in Handigaon stands majestically after being restored by an Italian project. Four stolen sculptures — the head of the 12th century Veenadharini Saraswati from Pharping's Kamalpokhari; the ninth century Buddha from Bhinchhe Bahal, Patan; the 14th century Surya from Panauti's Triveni Ghat and the tenth century Garudasana Vishnu from Hyumat Tole, Kathmandu — received from a Los Angeles based art-collector, have remained artifacts of great interest. These objects are kept in the stone work section of the gallery.

Nritya Devi is a restored wooden sculpture of a dancing goddess of the 15th century stored in the wood-carving section. Intricate motifs, carved on teak, sal or rose wood, on mountable window frames give a sense of refinement in woodcarving. A series of paintings depicting Krishna's miraculous deeds known as "Krishna Lila" are important artwork and covers major part of the gallery in the painting section.

== Buddhist Art Gallery ==
The Buddhist Art Gallery stores Buddhist paintings, sculptures and ritualistic objects. To provide a glimpse of the Buddhist art of the kingdom of Nepal, this gallery has been divided into three sections: the Terai, Kathmandu Valley and northern Himalayan sections. The Terai section is adorned with photographs of Lord Buddha's birthplace in Lumbini. Chaityas (stupas), statues of Buddha and Bodhisattvas cast in bronze comprise the Kathmandu valley section. The northern Himalayan section reflects the influence of Tibetan Buddhism, which apparently developed many rites and rituals. Therefore, ritualistic objects like phurpa (magical dart used especially for the ritual slaying of human effigy of foes) and dorje (represents thunder bolt) are found in this section. Thangka paintings made on cotton canvas or silk, Tibetan amulets and religious objects, also adorn the gallery. Appealing images of Manjushri (the deity of wisdom), yantra of the 19th century (showing chakras of the body), Dipankara Buddha are other important parts of the Buddhist collection.

== Historical Museum ==
The monumental building housing the Historical Museum was built by Bhimsen Thapa, prime minister of Nepal in the 18th century. Riches of Nepal's biodiversity are exhibited in these chambers — mammals, amphibians, reptiles, birds, butterflies and insects. Pelt, horn or endo-skeletons of tiger, leopard, red panda, flying squirrel, rhinoceros, whale, colourful plumage of birds may be cited.

The Military section is a collection of weapons and artifacts from ancient, medieval and modern Nepal. The leather-canons (seized during the first Nepal-Tibet war in 1792 A.D), cane helmets (from the time of early rulers), antique, electric and Thomson submachine guns, Birgun (a gun supposedly invented by Gahendra Shamsher JB Rana) have remained valuable possessions. The gallery has a sword presented by Napoleon III and life-size paintings of tiger hunting as royal sport, on display. Historical and modern paintings of Prime Ministers and kings of the Malla and Shah dynasties are exhibited along with show cases presenting Nepalese historical weapons.

The Numismatic section preserves rare copper, silver and gold coins from the Licchavi era (fifth to seventh century) until modern times. Some tokens made of clay or leather, and banknotes are also on display.

== See also ==
- List of museums in Nepal
