= Sneha Shrestha (artist) =

Nepali contemporary artist most

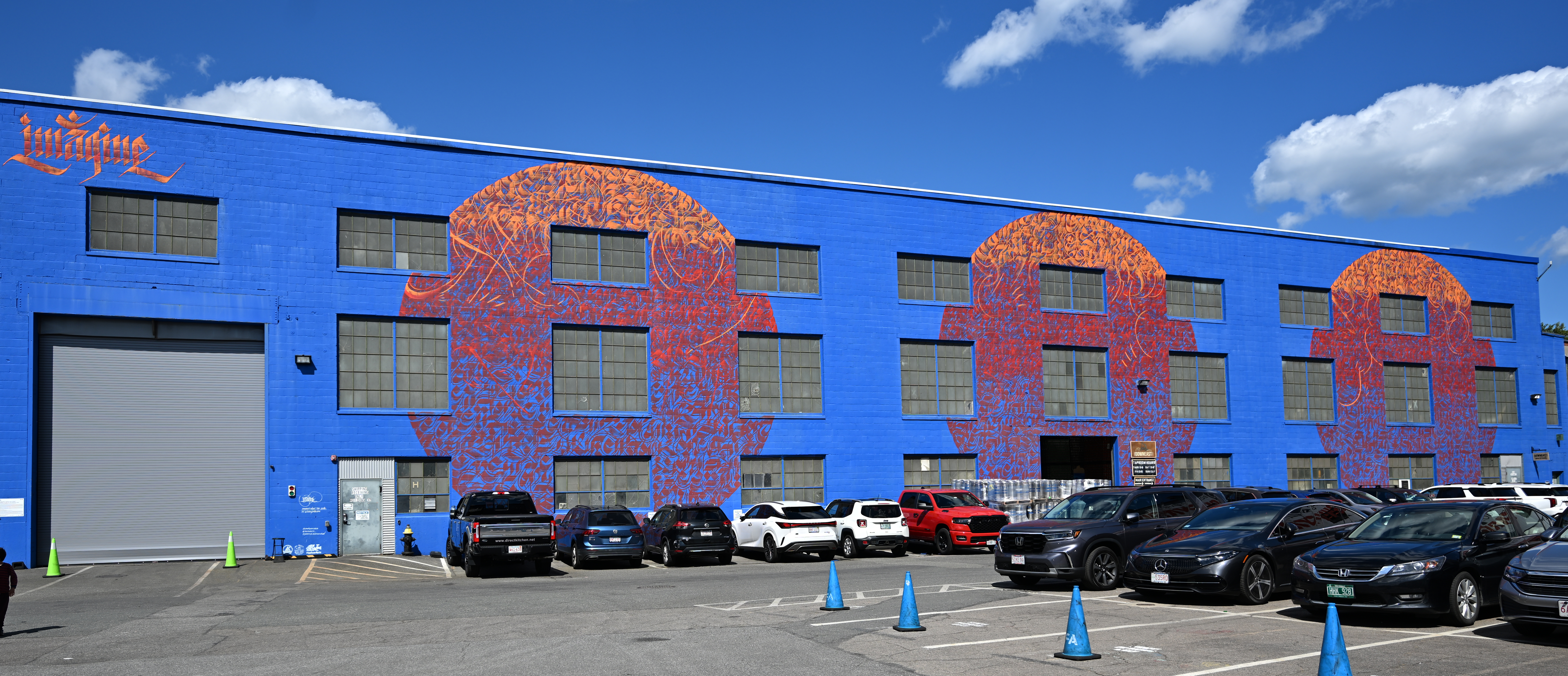
- Mural by Shresta in the East Boston Shipyard
- Born: Kathmandu, Nepal
- Other names: IMAGINE
- Education: Gettysburg College (BA), Harvard Graduate School of Education (MEd),
- Occupations: Painter, street artist, educator, arts administrator
- Website: www.snehashrestha.com

Sneha Shrestha (Nepali: स्नेहा श्रेष्ठ) is a Nepali contemporary visual artist, street artist, educator, and arts administrator. She is known for starting the Children's Art Museum of Nepal, and for her graffiti art, using the handle IMAGINE.

== Biography ==
Shrestha was born in Kathmandu, Nepal. After graduating in 2010 from Gettysburg College in Gettysburg, Pennsylvania, Shrestha moved to Boston, Massachusetts. She earned a master's degree from the Harvard Graduate School of Education in 2017.

Shrestha works at the Mittal Institute at Harvard University, as an arts program manager. Her signature for her graffiti work is "IMAGINE," which is her mother's name translated into English.

== Career ==
=== Children's Art Museum of Nepal ===
Shrestha founded the Children's Art Museum of Nepal in 2013 with support from World Learning.

=== Graffiti ===
In her graffiti work, Shrestha uses the Nepali alphabet, taking inspiration from Sanskrit scriptures. Shrestha calls these works "calligraffiti," a portmanteau of calligraphy and graffiti.

She has painted numerous murals in Cambridge and Boston, including "For Cambridge With Love From Nepal," "Saya Patri (The One With A Hundred Petals)," "Knowledge is Power" at Northeastern University, and around the world in Kathmandu, Istanbul, and Bali.

She has also collaborated with companies including Reebok, as part of their Artist's Collective collection, as well as TripAdvisor, Red Bull, and Boston craft brewery Aeronaut Brewing Company.

=== Awards and honors ===
In 2025, she was recognized by the James and Audrey Foster Prize. First established in 1999, the prize (formerly the ICA Artist Prize) and exhibition were endowed by James and Audrey Foster to nurture and recognize exceptional Boston-area artists. https://www.icaboston.org/exhibitions/2025-james-and-audrey-foster-prize/

In 2018, she was Boston's Artist-in-Residence. In 2019, she was one of the artists selected for the Boston Museum of Fine Art's Community Arts Initiative Artist Project.

Her work is held in the private collections of Capital One, Fidelity Investments, Google, and Facebook.

== Exhibitions ==
=== Solo exhibitions ===
- 2025: ‘’2025 James and Audrey Foster Prize,’’ ICA Boston Fotene Demoulas Gallery https://www.icaboston.org/exhibitions/2025-james-and-audrey-foster-prize/
- 2019: Golden Equinox, Simmons University Trustman Gallery.
- 2019: Mindful Mandalas, Museum of Fine Arts, Boston.
- 2018: MANTRA: Sneha Shrestha, Distillery Gallery, Boston.
