= Cosmic Air =

Nepalese airline

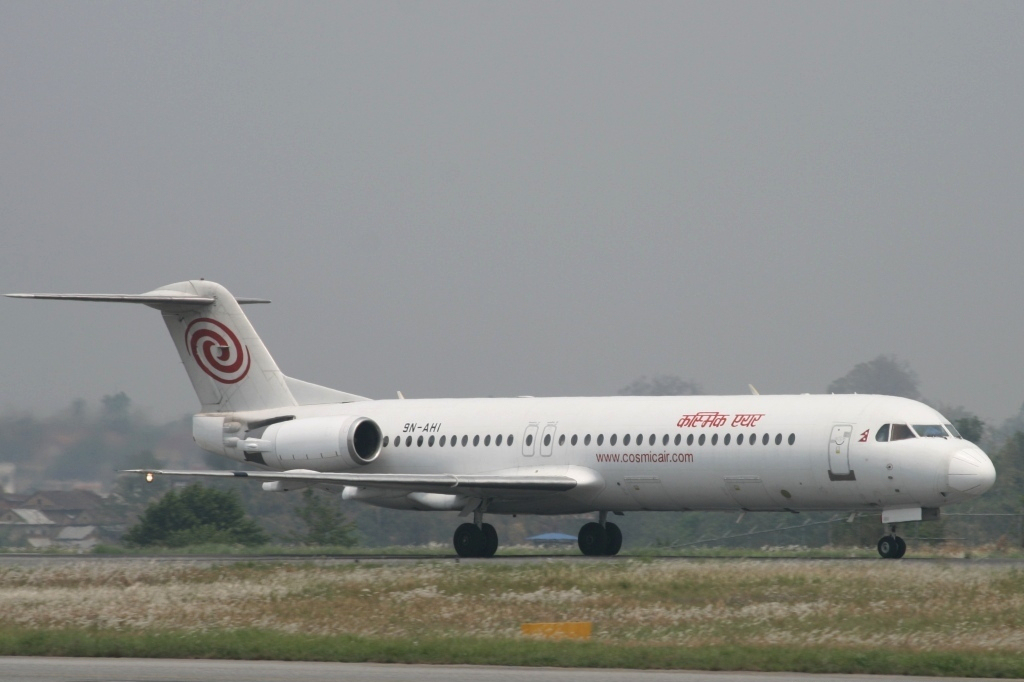
- Fokker 100 9N-AHI at Tribhuvan Int'l Airport
IATA	ICAO	Call sign
F5	COZ	COSMIC AIR
- Founded: 1997
- Ceased operations: 2008
- AOC #: 018/2003
- Hubs: Tribhuvan International Airport
- Focus cities: Indira Gandhi International Airport
- Fleet size: 9 (at closure)
- Parent company: SOI Group
- Headquarters: Kathmandu, Nepal
- Key people: Sushil Shrestha (president)

Cosmic Air Pvt. Ltd. (Nepali: कस्मिक एयर) was an airline based in Kathmandu, Nepal. It operated scheduled domestic and international services out of Tribhuvan International Airport. After already having been forced to temporarily suspend flights in 2005 and 2006 due to budgetary constraints, Cosmic Air ceased its operations in 2008.

== History ==
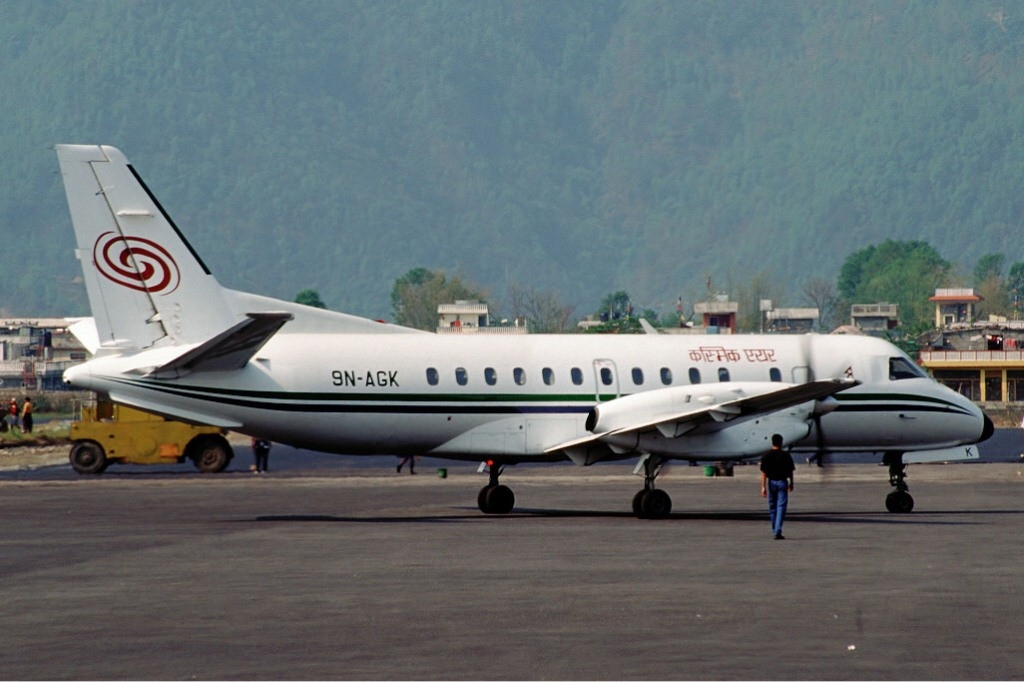
Cosmic Air Saab 340 at Pokhara Airport (April 2001)

Cosmic Air was established in 1997 as a company wholly owned by Captain RP Pradhan. Flight operations started on 1 January 1998 with two Mil Mi-17 helicopters. In August 1998 Dornier 228 aircraft were added to the fleet. In October 2004 Cosmic Air acquired its first 105-seat Fokker 100 aircraft on lease from AerCap. In January and April 2005 two further airplanes of this type were leased to Cosmic Air.

At its height in 2005 international services were launched. Financial problems became public in November of the same year, when the airline had to halt its domestic operations after the state-owned Nepal Oil Corporation refused to sell it fuel unless it cleared past debts of 125 million rupees. Operations were restarted after Cosmic Air managed to pay its first instalment of 5 million rupees. Still, Cosmic Air incurred a loss of 620 million rupees for 2005.

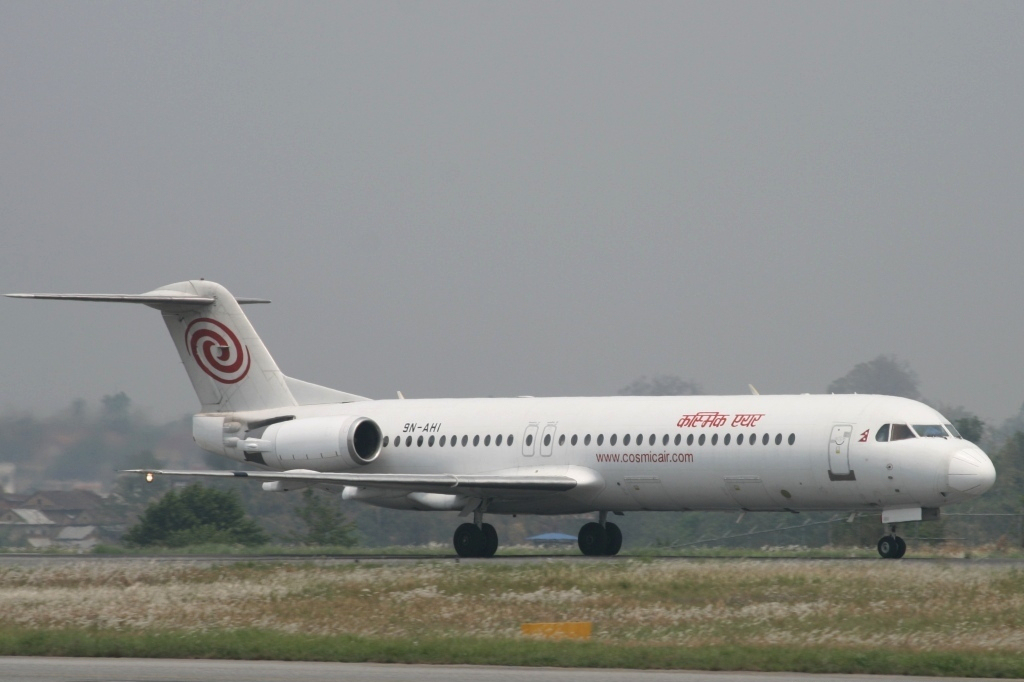
Cosmic Air Fokker 100 at Tribhuvan International Airport (April 2008).

Another temporary suspension of operations occurred on 14 October 2006 due technical problems with the airline's only operational Fokker 100 aircraft forcing it to be grounded at Tribhuvan International Airport. On 1 January 2007, India provided a temporary maintenance and operational base at New Delhi. By, then Cosmic air flew only to Kolkata, Mumbai and Varanasi also, limited cargo flights continued into India western provinces Gujarat Ahmedabad. After one year of suspension of its operations, Cosmic Air restarted scheduled services in October 2007.

In 2008, Cosmic Air ceased its operations. According to The Kathmandu Post, this was caused mostly by the price war between the three biggest private airlines of Nepal at that time, Cosmic Air, Buddha Air and Yeti Airlines.

On 10 January 2010, the Civil Aviation Authority of Nepal officially retracted Cosmic Air's Air operator's certificate.

== Destinations ==
Cosmic Air regularly served the following destinations from its hub at Tribhuvan International Airport, which were cancelled either at the closure of operations or before:

Country	City	IATA	ICAO	Airport	Notes	Refs
Bangladesh	Dhaka	DAC	VGHS	Shahjalal International Airport		
India	New Delhi	DEL	VIDP	Indira Gandhi International Airport		
India	Varanasi	VNS	VEBN	Lal Bahadur Shastri Airport		
India	Kolkata	CCU	VECC	Netaji Subhas Chandra Bose International Airport		
Nepal	Bhairahawa	BWA	VNBW	Bhairahawa Airport		
Nepal	Bharatpur	BHR	VNBP	Bharatpur Airport		
Nepal	Biratnagar	BIR	VNVT	Biratnagar Airport		
Nepal	Jomsom	JMO	VNJS	Jomsom Airport		
Nepal	Kathmandu	KTM	VNKT	Tribhuvan International Airport	Hub	
Nepal	Nepalgunj	KEP	VNNG	Nepalgunj Airport		
Nepal	Pokhara	PKR	VNPK	Pokhara Airport		

Cosmic Air also operated scheduled mountain sightseeing flights from Kathmandu to Mount Everest range. The flights usually departed in the early morning hours and returned to the airport one hour later.

== Fleet ==
At its height during 2005/2006, Cosmic Air operated a fleet the following types of aircraft:

Cosmic Air fleet
Aircraft	In service	Passengers			Notes	Refs
Aircraft	In service	C	Y	Total	Notes	Refs
Fokker 100	4	—	105	105	only one of which remained with the airline upon closure	
Saab 340	1	—	33	33		
Dornier 228	4	—	18	18		
Total	9					

=== Former fleet ===
Cosmic Air historical fleet
Aircraft	Introduced	Retired	Notes
Mil Mi-17	1997	?	

== Trivia ==
After Cosmic Air's closure, one former Fokker 100 aircraft of the airline is at display at Aircraft Museum Dhangadhi, Nepal's first aviation museum.
