= Statue of Jayavarma =

Sculpture of King Jayavarma of Nepal

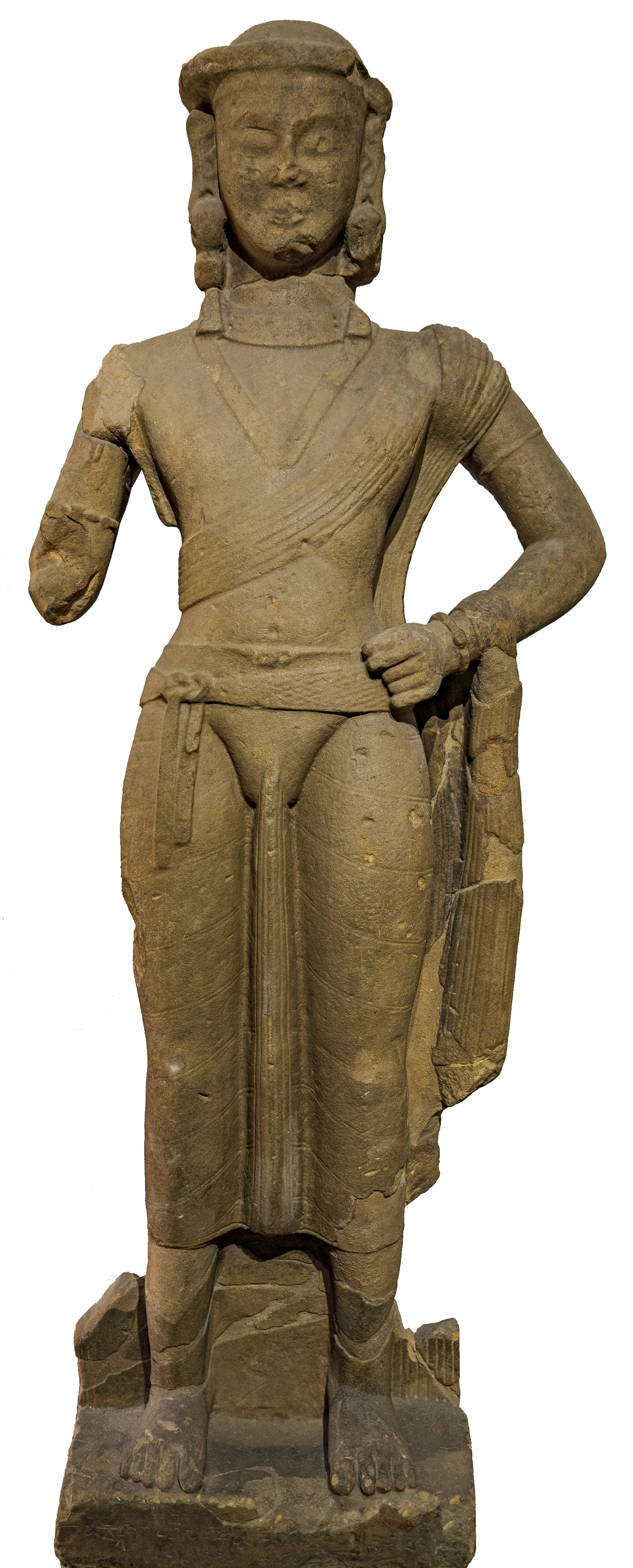
- Year: 185
- Subject: King Jayavarma
- Location: National Museum of Nepal; Kathmandu

The Statue of Jayavarma (Nepali: जयवर्माको मूर्ति) is a sculpture of King Jayavarma. It was found in 1992 in Maligaon, Kathmandu and it dates back to 184/185 AD. The inscription is written in Gupta style Brahmi script and its the Jayavarma's name and the year.

The Statue of Jayavarma is currently kept at the National Museum of Nepal. It is considered that the Statue of Jayavarma is the oldest sandstone sculpture in Nepal. In 2004, the Government of Nepal, issued stamps featuring the Statue of Jayavarma.
