= Aircraft Museum Kathmandu =

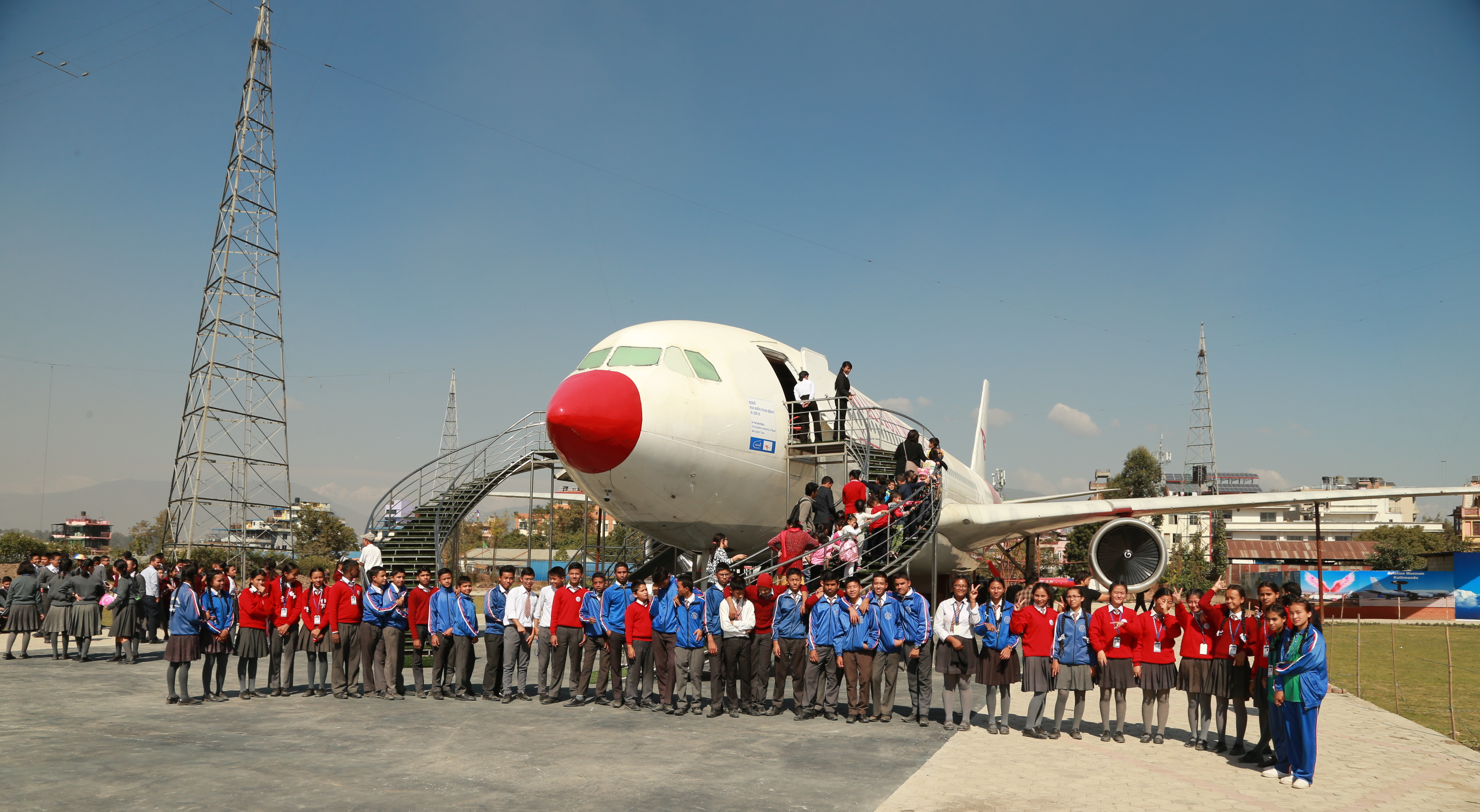
- Established: 5 November 2017
- Location: Sinamangal, Kathmandu, Nepal
- Coordinates: 27.694002649010965°N 85.35355971410345°E
- Type: Aviation museum
- Website: www.aviationmuseumnepal.com

Aircraft Museum Kathmandu is an aviation museum located in Sinamangal, Kathmandu, Nepal. The museum is inside an Airbus A330-300 of Turkish Airlines that only flew for about eight months before suffering a runway excursion at Tribhuvan International Airport in Kathmandu in March 2015. It was established under a joint initiative by the Civil Aviation Authority of Nepal and pilot Bed Upreti and his trust. This museum was officially opened to public on 28 November, 2017. The museum's exhibits include the aircraft's original cockpit setting, model and miniature aircraft and items documenting the history of Nepalese aviation. The museum is the second of its kind in Nepal, after Bed Upreti had already set up a similar, yet smaller aviation museum, the Aircraft Museum Dhangadhi in Dhangadhi in Western Nepal. The museum cost around NPRs 70 million.
