= Aircraft Museum Dhangadhi =

- Established: 17 September 2014
- Location: Dhangadhi, Nepal
- Coordinates: 28.707477113580655°N 80.58837753556874°E
- Type: Aviation museum

Aircraft Museum Dhangadhi is an aviation museum located in Dhangadhi, Nepal some 500 km west from Kathmandu. It was established by former Nepalese pilot Bed Upreti and his trust on September 17, 2014, as Nepal's first aircraft museum. The museum is housed inside a decommissioned Fokker-100 plane, which is 35.53 meters long and was operated by Cosmic Air until it ceased operations in 2008. Approximately 200 miniature commercial planes and fighter jets are on display. In addition to the miniature planes, there is an aerial photo gallery and a cockpit café. The revenue generated by the museum is used to assist cancer patients. A second museum, the Aviation Museum Kathmandu, has been established in the capital of Nepal, Kathmandu by Bed Upreti Trust in 2017 following the success of the Aircraft Museum Dhangadhi.
