= Sports Museum =

A Sports Museum is a museum dedicated to sports. It can refer to:

- 3-2-1 Qatar Olympic and Sports Museum, located in Al Rayyan, Qatar
- Australian Sports Museum, located in Melbourne, Australia
- Chicago Sports Museum, located in Chicago
- Estonian Sports and Olympic Museum, located in Tartu, Estonia
- Fanattic Sports Museum, located in New Town, India
- Singapore Sports Museum, in Singapore
- Sports Museum of Aruba, located in Aruba
- Sports Museum of Finland, located in Finland
- The Sports Museum, located in Boston, Massachusetts

== Former ==
- Newport Sports Museum, in Newport Beach, California, closed 2014
- Sports Museum of America, in New York City, closed 2009
