= Mahendra Museum =

Museum in Nepal

Coordinates: 27.70436°N 85.30721°E

The Mahendra Museum is a museum located in Nepal. The museum is situated inside Hanuman Dhoka palace Museum in Kathmandu Durbar square. The museum is named in honor of His Majesty Mahendra Bir Bikram Shah Dev.

== See also ==
- List of museums in Nepal
