= Palace museum =

A palace museum refers a number of museums that are housed in former royal palaces.

- In Mainland China
  - The Palace Museum, housed in the Forbidden City in Beijing.
    - The Kulangsu Gallery of Foreign Artifacts from the Palace Museum Collection in Kulangsu, Xiamen.
  - The Shenyang Imperial Palace Museum in Shenyang, Liaoning.
- In Hong Kong
  - The Hong Kong Palace Museum, a public museum exhibiting artefacts of the Beijing's Palace Museum in West Kowloon.
- In Taiwan
  - The National Palace Museum, formerly housed in the Forbidden City, now sits in Taipei and houses part of its former collection.
  - The Southern Branch of the National Palace Museum in Chiayi.
- In other regions
  - The National Palace Museum of Korea, repository of royal heritage in Seoul, South Korea.
  - The Topkapı Palace Museum in Istanbul, Turkey.
  - The Red Fort Archaeological Museum in Delhi, India, known as Palace Museum during the British rule.
  - The Malacca Sultanate Palace Museum, an example of a palace that was reconstructed to function as a museum, in Malacca, Malaysia

Many former royal palaces house museums; these include.

- The Louvre Palace in Paris
- The Palace of Versailles near Paris
- The Winter Palace in St Petersburg
- The Royal Palace, Luang Prabang
- The Royal Palace, Porto-Novo
- The Museum of King John III's Palace at Wilanów in Warsaw
- The Niavaran Palace Complex near Tehran
- The Istana Negara, Jalan Istana in Kuala Lumpur

== See also ==
- Royal Palace Museum (disambiguation)
