= Patan Durbar Square =

Palace square in Lalitpur, Nepal

- Yela Lāyekū (Newar)
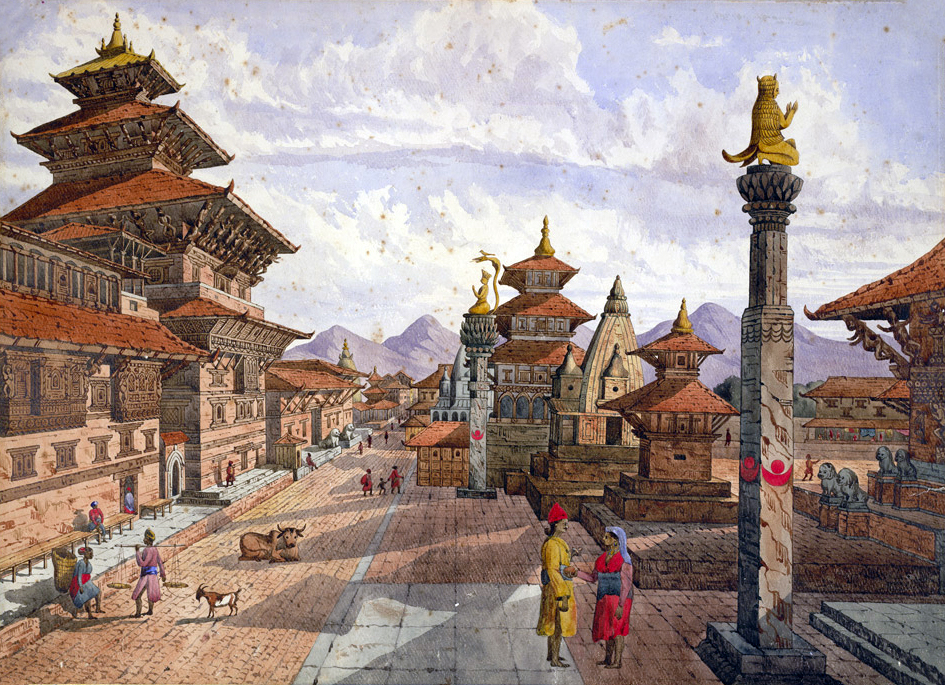
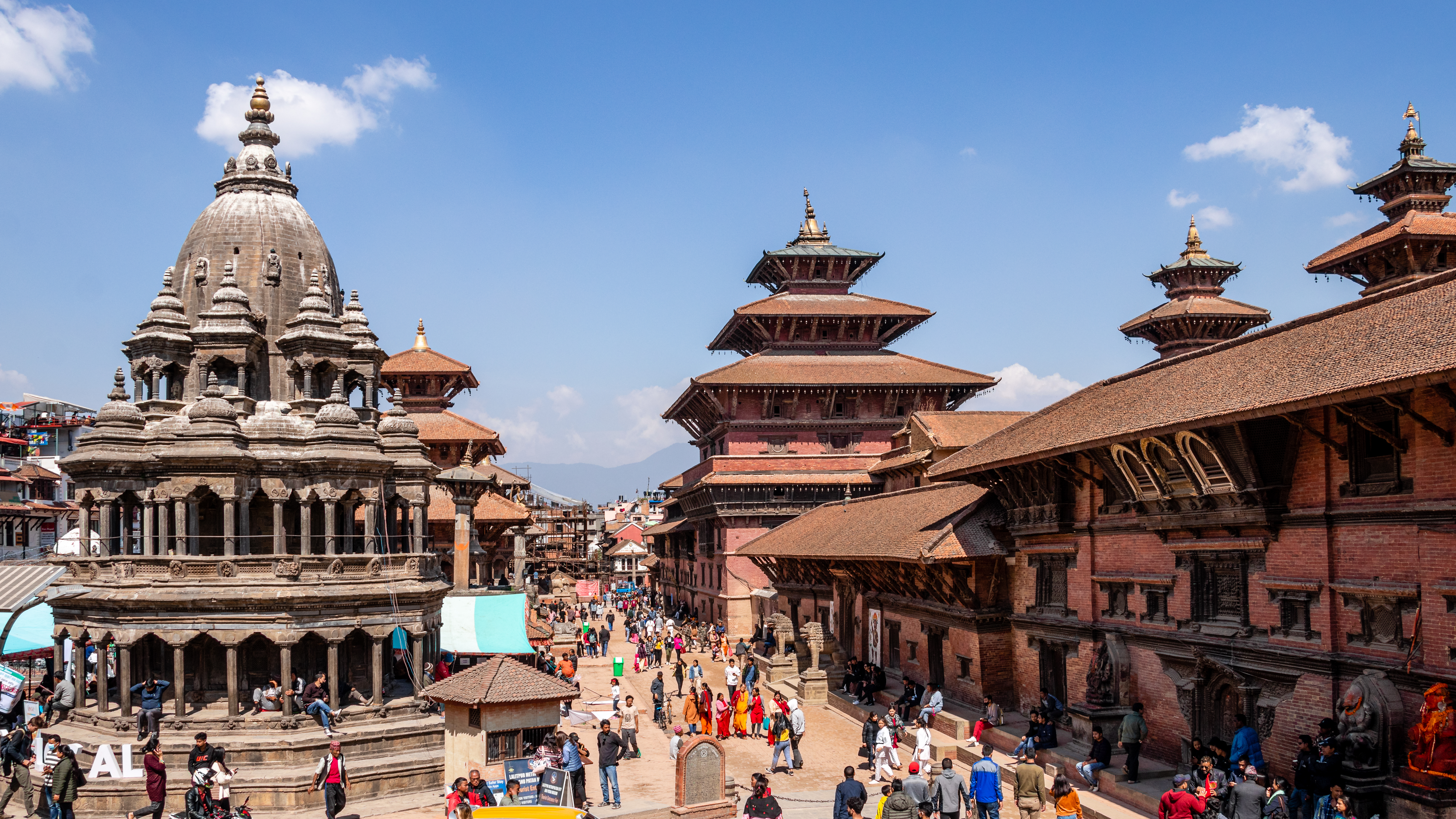
- Patan Durbar Square in 1855, painted by Henry Ambrose Oldfield Current view of the square

- Location within Nepal
- Interactive map of Patan Durbar Square
- 27°40′24″N 85°19′30″E
- Location: Lalitpur, Nepal

History
- Built: 1637 AD
- Original use: Royal Palace

Site notes
- Area: 18.85 ha (46.6 acres)
- Architectural style: Newar architecture
- Website: http://www.patanmuseum.gov.np

UNESCO World Heritage Site
- Type: Cultural
- Criteria: iii, iv, vi
- Designated: 1979
- Part of: Kathmandu Valley
- Reference no.: 121
- Region: Asia
- Session: 3rd

Protected Monument Zone
- Law: Ancient Monuments Preservation Act, 2013 (1956)

Patan Durbar Square (Nepal Bhasa: 𑐫𑐮 𑐮𑐵𑐫𑐎𑐹/यल लायकु, Nepali: पाटन दरबार क्षेत्र) is situated at the centre of the city of Lalitpur in Nepal. It is one of the three Durbar Squares in the Kathmandu Valley, all of which are UNESCO World Heritage Sites. One of its attractions is the medieval royal palace where the Malla Kings of Lalitpur resided.

The Durbar Square is a marvel of Newa architecture. The square is paved with red bricks bordered by stone. There are many temples and statues in the area. The main temples are aligned opposite the western face of the palace. The entrance of the temples faces east, towards the palace. There is also a bell situated in the alignment beside the main temples. The Square also holds old Newari residential houses. There are other temples and structures in and around Patan Durbar Square built by the Newa People. A center of both Hinduism and Buddhism, Patan Durbar Square has 136 "bahals" (courtyards) and 55 major temples.

The square was heavily damaged by the earthquake in April 2015.

== History ==
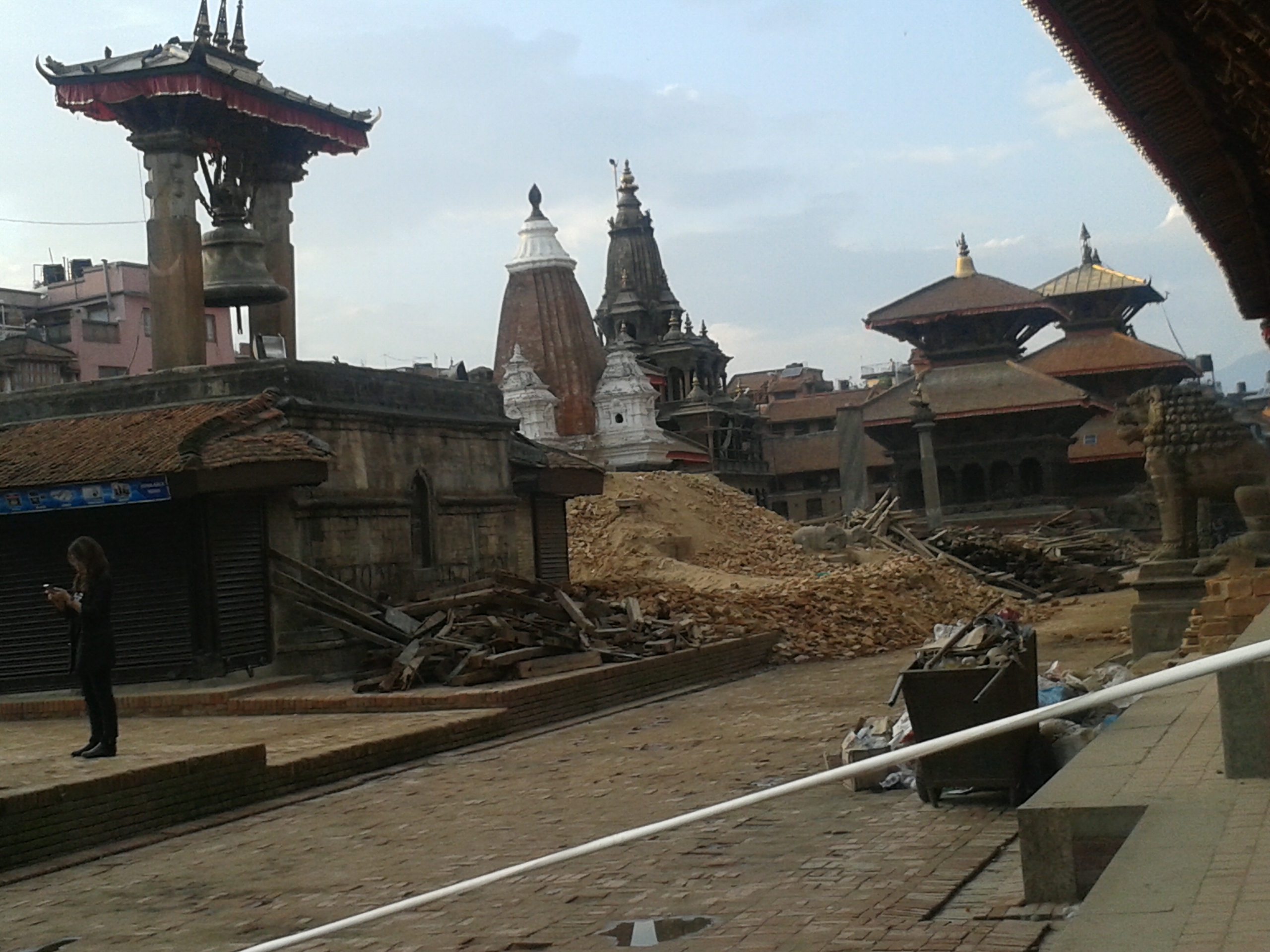
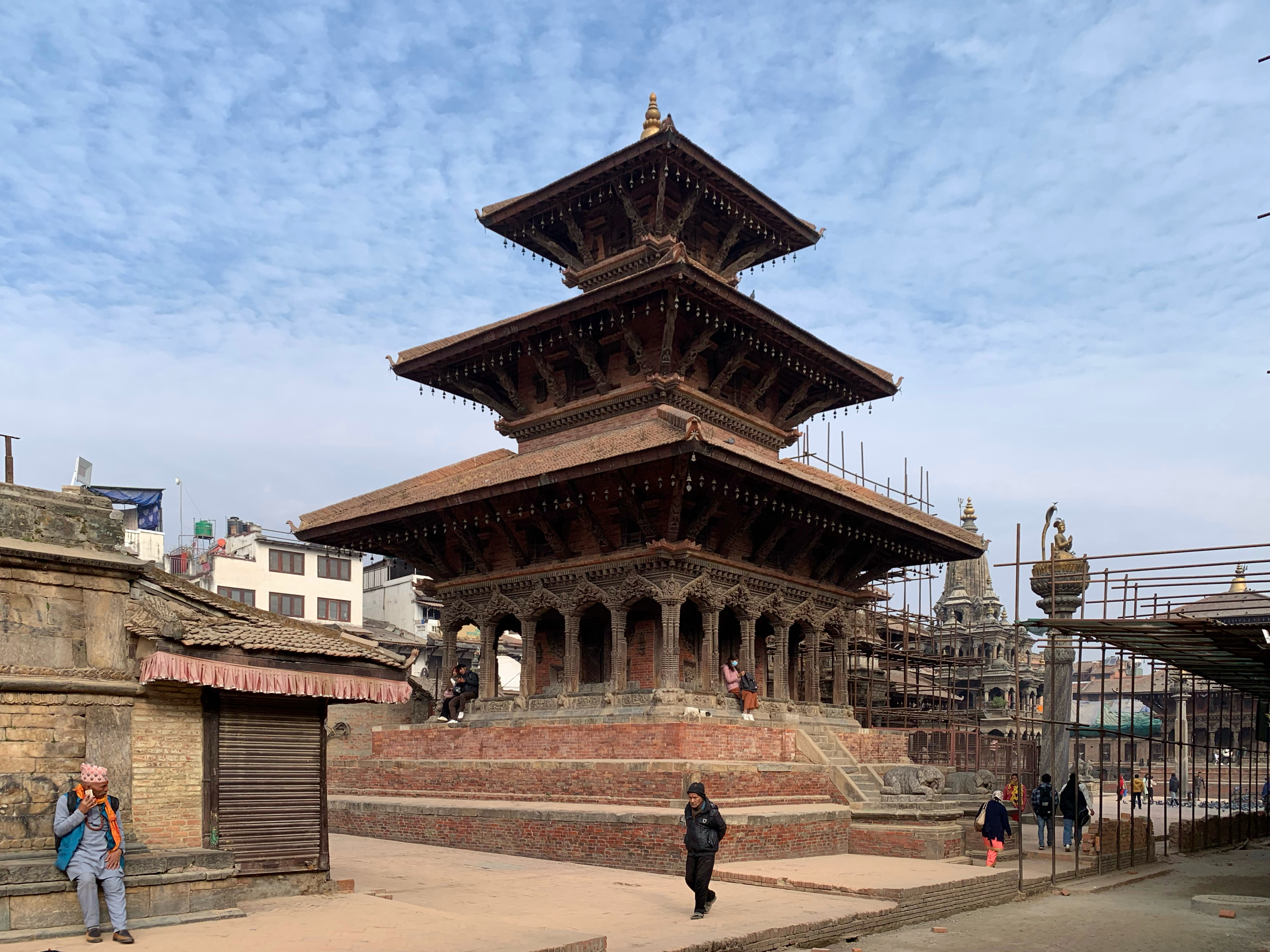
Hari Shankar Temple completely collapsed after 2015 earthquake (left), and after its full restoration; pictured in 2023 (right)

The history of Durbar Square is not clear. Although the Malla Kings of Lalitpur are credited with the establishment of the royal square, it is known that the site was an ancient crossroad. The Pradhanas, who settled around the site before the Mallas, have connections with the Durbar Square. Some chronicles hint that the Thakuri dynasty built a palace and made reforms to the locality, but there is little evidence of this. Scholars are certain that Patan was a prosperous city since ancient times. There is also an evidence that the Patan was founded during the 3rd century BC by the Kirat dynasty and was later expanded in the sixth century.

The Malla Kings made important changes to the square. Most of the current architecture is from the 1600s, constructed during the reign of King Siddhi Narsingh Malla and his son Srinivasa Sukriti. Some of the notable Malla Kings who improved the square include Purandarasimha, Sivasimha Malla and Yoganarendra Malla.

== Important buildings ==
Patan is one of the oldest Buddhist cities. It is a center of both Hinduism and Buddhism with 136 bahals or courtyards and 55 major temples. Most of these structures are in the vicinity of the Durbar Square.

=== Krishna Mandir ===
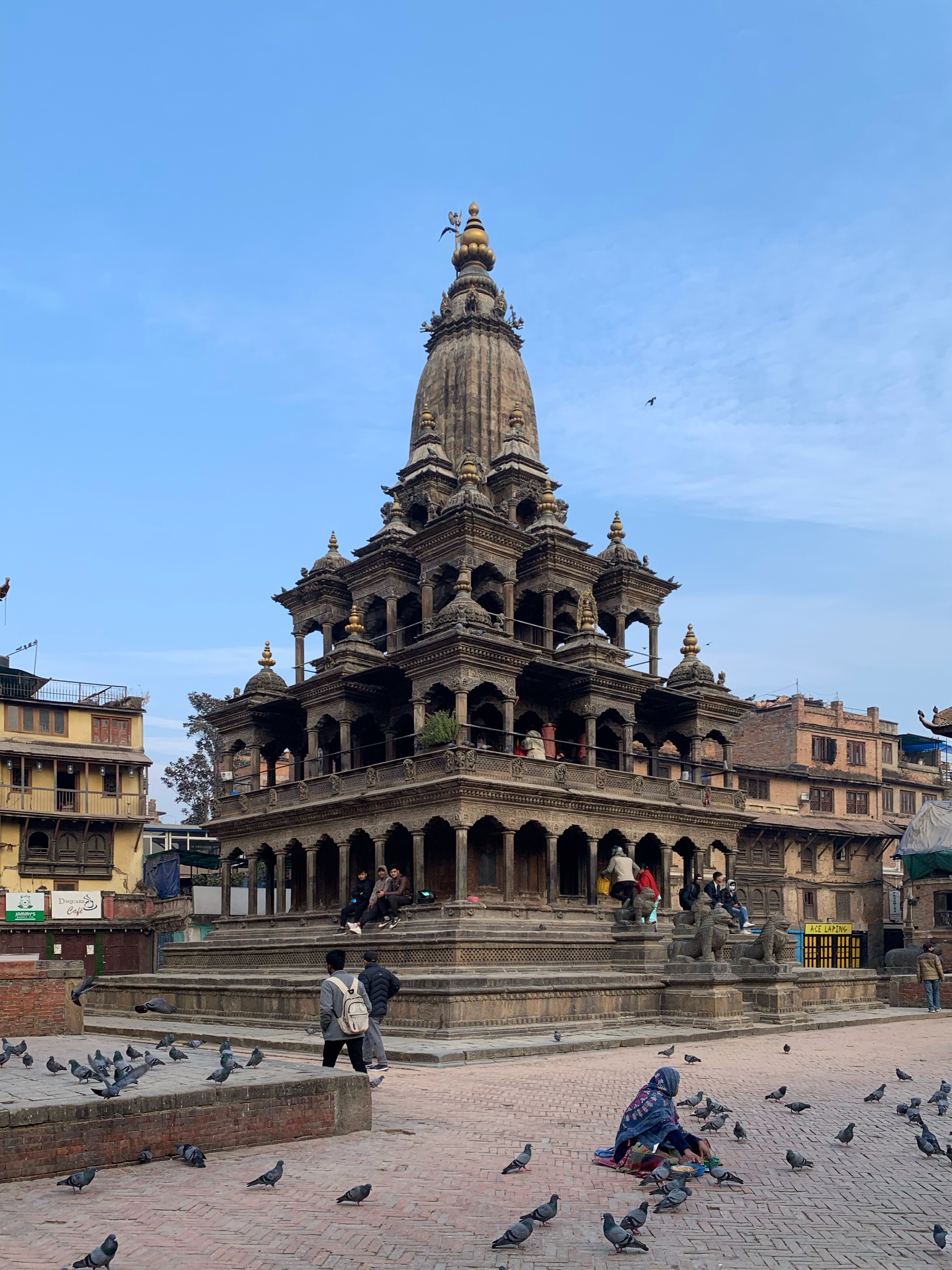
Krishna Mandir

Krishna Mandir is one of the most important temple in Patan Durbar Square. A three-storied structure, it was built in the local variety of Shikhara style called Granthakuta. The stone carvings along the beam above the first and second-floor pillar are most notable. The first-floor pillar carvings narrate the events of the Mahabharata, while on the second floor there are visual carvings from Ramayana.

The temple was built in 1667 by King Siddhi Narsingh Malla. It is said that one night the King saw Lord Krishna and his consort Srimati Radha standing in front of the royal palace. He ordered a temple to be built on the same spot. There are 21 golden pinnacles in the temple. Below the pinnacles are three stories. The first floor holds the main shrine of Lord Krishna with shrines of Radha and Rukmini at each side. The second floor is dedicated to Lord Shiva and the third to Lokeshwor (Avalokiteshvara).

The square is crowded with thousands of Hindu Pilgrims and devotees during Krishnastami.

=== Bhimsen Temple ===
Bhimsen (Bhin : dya) Temple was built by Srinivasa Malla in 1680. It is renowned for its three interconnected golden windows. Bhimsen is a great personality in Mahabharata. He is the second-born son of Kunti and King Pandu, and one of the five Pandavas, known for his bravery and strength. Newa people worship him as a god of business and trade. Tourists are not allowed inside the temple. Photos are also not allowed to be taken inside the temple.

=== Vishwanath Temple ===
Vishwanath Temple is dedicated to Lord Shiva. It was built in 1627 AD during the reign of Siddhi Narsingh Malla. The roof supports are decorated with erotic carvings similar to imagery widespread in Shiva temples in India. The temple is guarded by two stone elephants in the front entrance. On the other side of the temple is the sculpture of a bull, Shiva's vehicle. A stone linga is enshrined inside the temple. It is located between Krishna Mandir and Bhimsen Temple.

=== Taleju Bhawani Temple ===
Taleju temple was built by Siddhi Narsingh Malla in 1640 and rebuilt by Srinivasa Malla in 1667 after a fire. Taleju Bhawani was the personal deity of the Malla kings. It is a five-storey temple with triple-roofs. The 14th century chronicle of Gopala kings hints that the Taleju temple was built by the Pradhanas before the Mallas. The temple is not open to the public.

== Layout of the Palace ==
The three main courtyards in the palace are Mul Chowk, Sundari Chowk and Keshav Narayan Chowk. Besides these courtyards, the complex boasts large temples, religious shrines, and historical places, all noted for their exquisite carvings and display of ancient Newari architecture.

=== Keshav Narayan Chowk ===
Keshav Narayan Chowk is, inside the Patan Museum, to the north of the Mul Chowk. Keshav Narayan Temple is located at the center of this chowk and gave the chowk its name.

=== Mul Chowk ===
Mul Chowk is the central courtyard. It is the most famous and largest courtyard among the three main chowks. Vidya Temple is located at its center and Taleju temples stand around the courtyard. The doorway to the Shrine of Taleju, on the southern side of the courtyard, is confined by the statues of the river goddesses Ganga, on a tortoise, and Jamuna, on a carved makara (mythical crocodile).

=== Sundari Chowk ===
Sundari Chowk is to the south of the Mul Chowk. It is designed with a sunken tank known as Tusha Hiti. Smaller than the Mul Chowk, it is now open to the public. The entrance of the chowk is guarded by the stone statues of Hanuman, Ganesh, and Nara Singha, man-lion forms of Vishnu. As one enters through, the chowk, they can see various local shops selling typical Newari cuisine. The Newari cuisine consists of yomari, kachela, chhoila, black beans, beaten rice, vegetables along with the Newari drink called chhyang which is made from rice. Sundari chowk is known for the nightlife and recently there is a gigantic self-illuminating moon placed in the chowk which has now become the attraction for tourists as well as the local people.

== Gallery ==
Patan Durbar Square, 1988

Temples at Patan Durbar Square, 1988

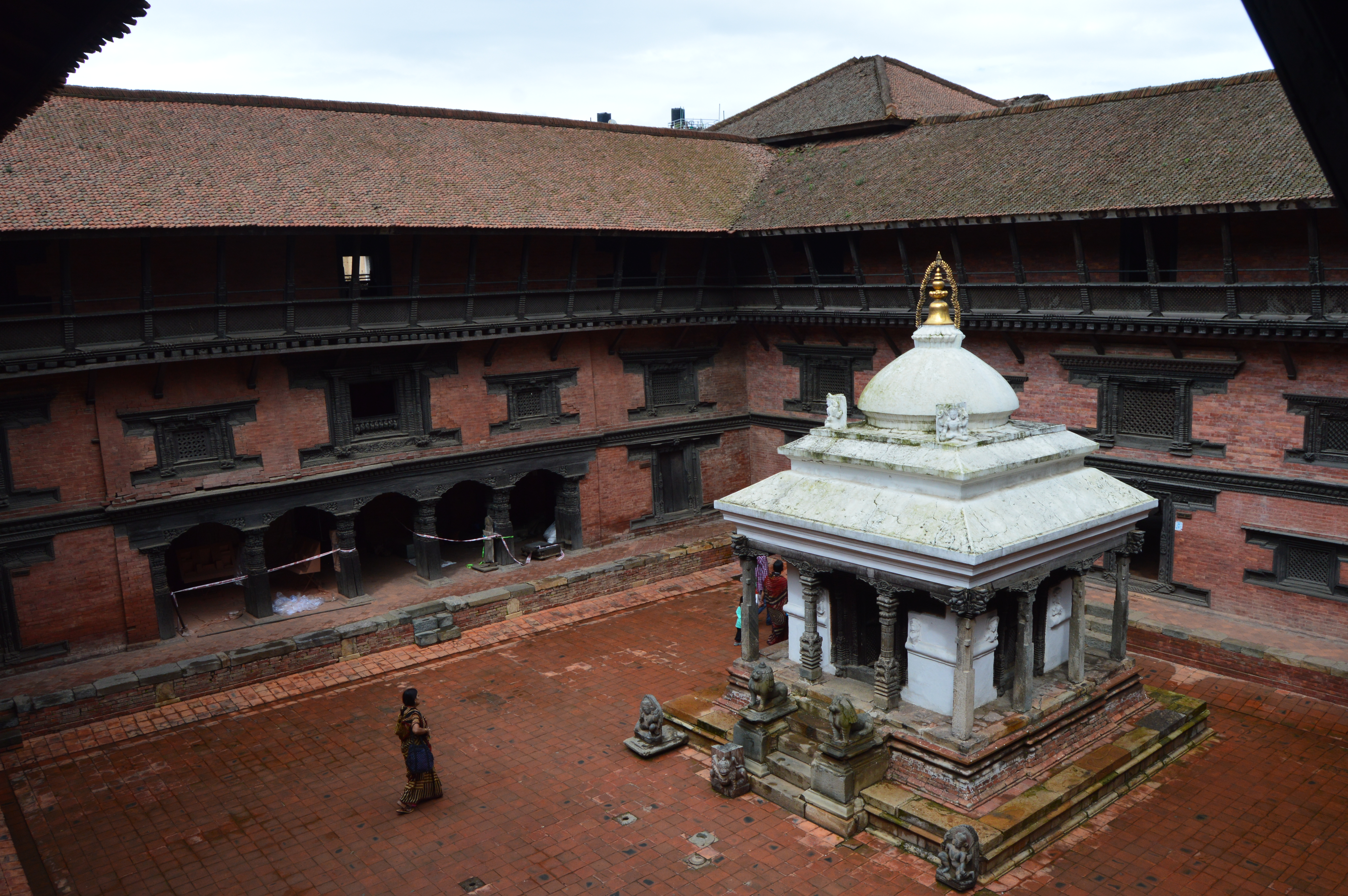
Keshav Narayan Chowk

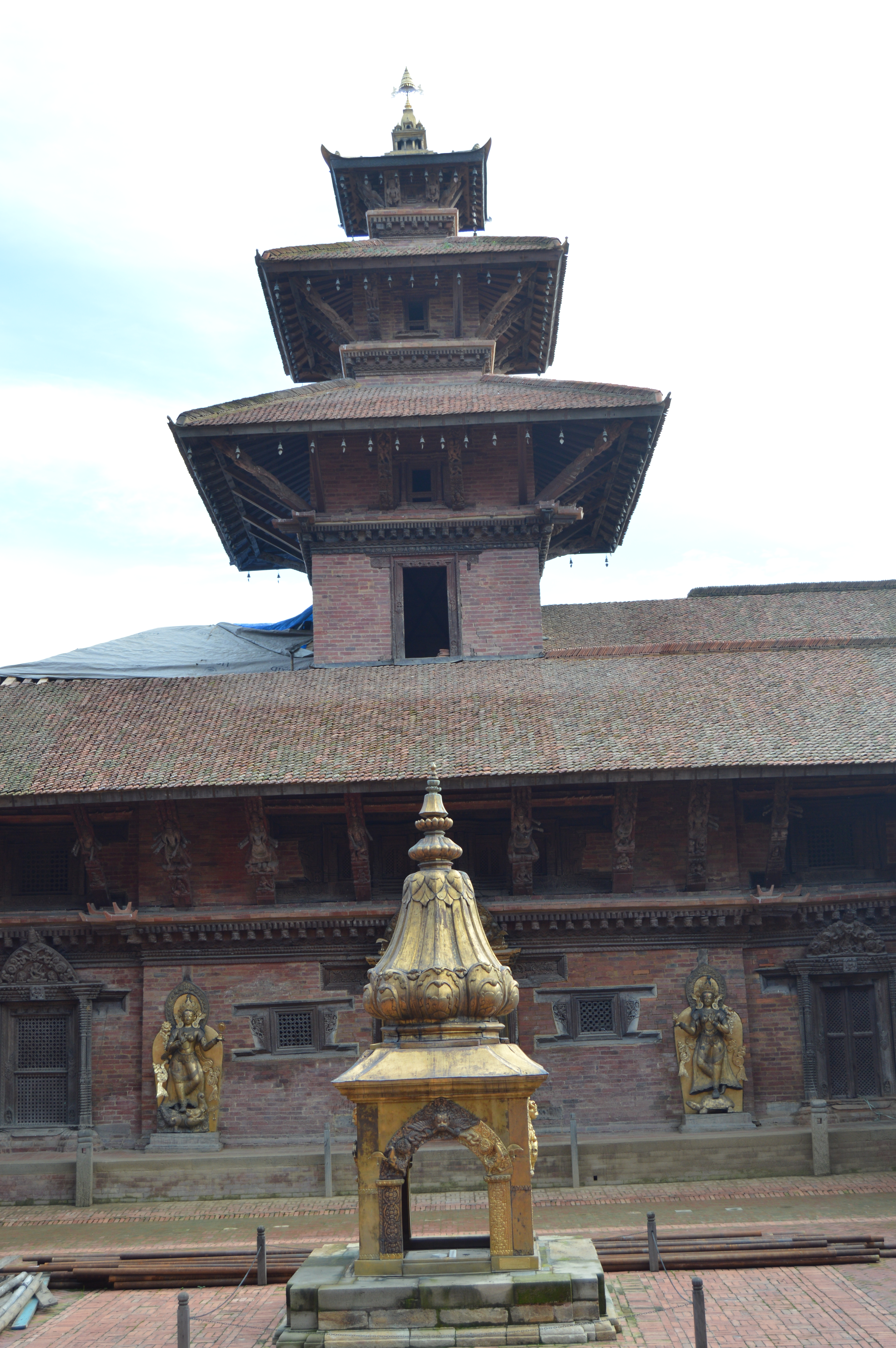
Mul chowk, Patan Durbar Square

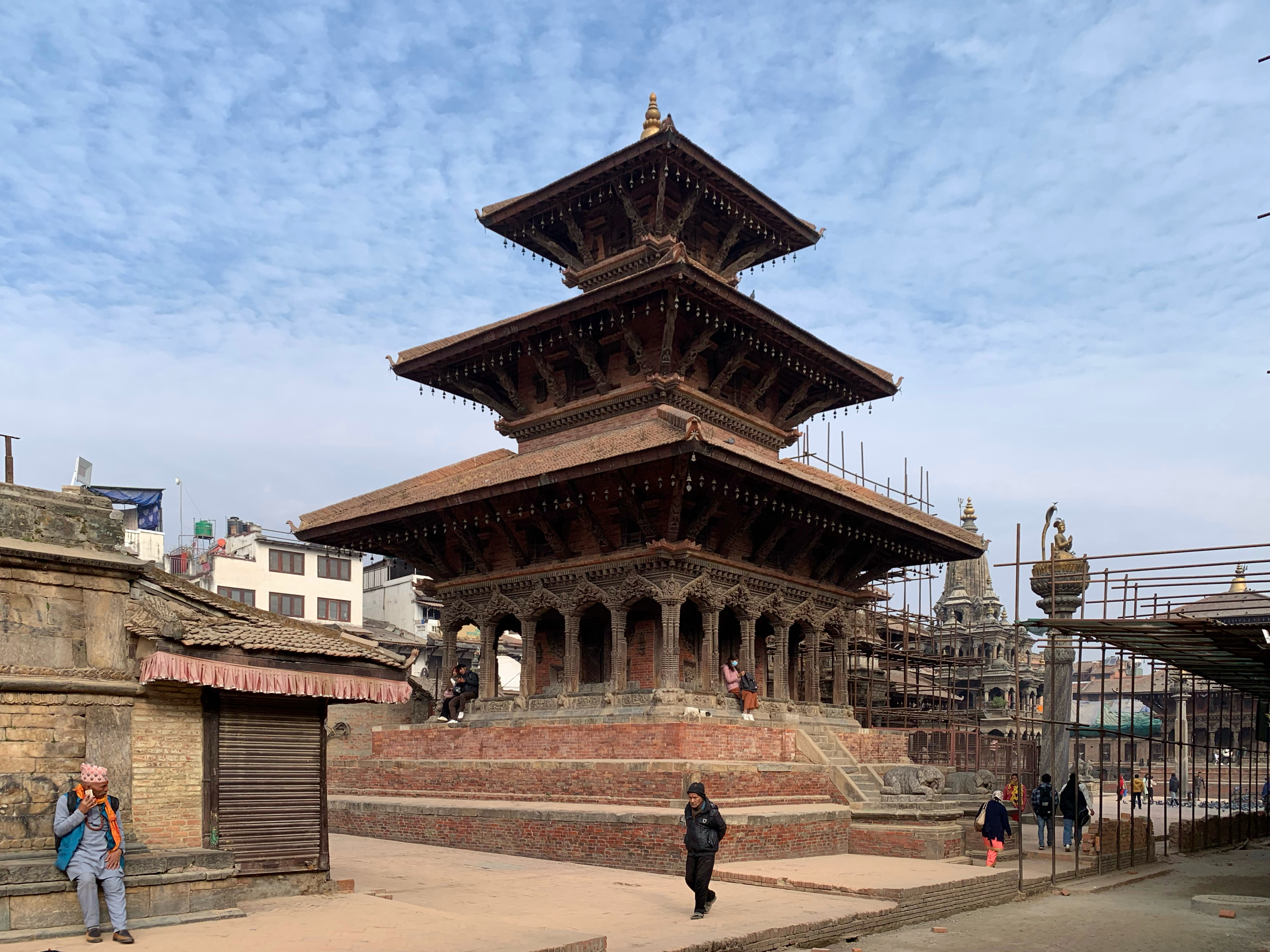
Hari Shankar Temple

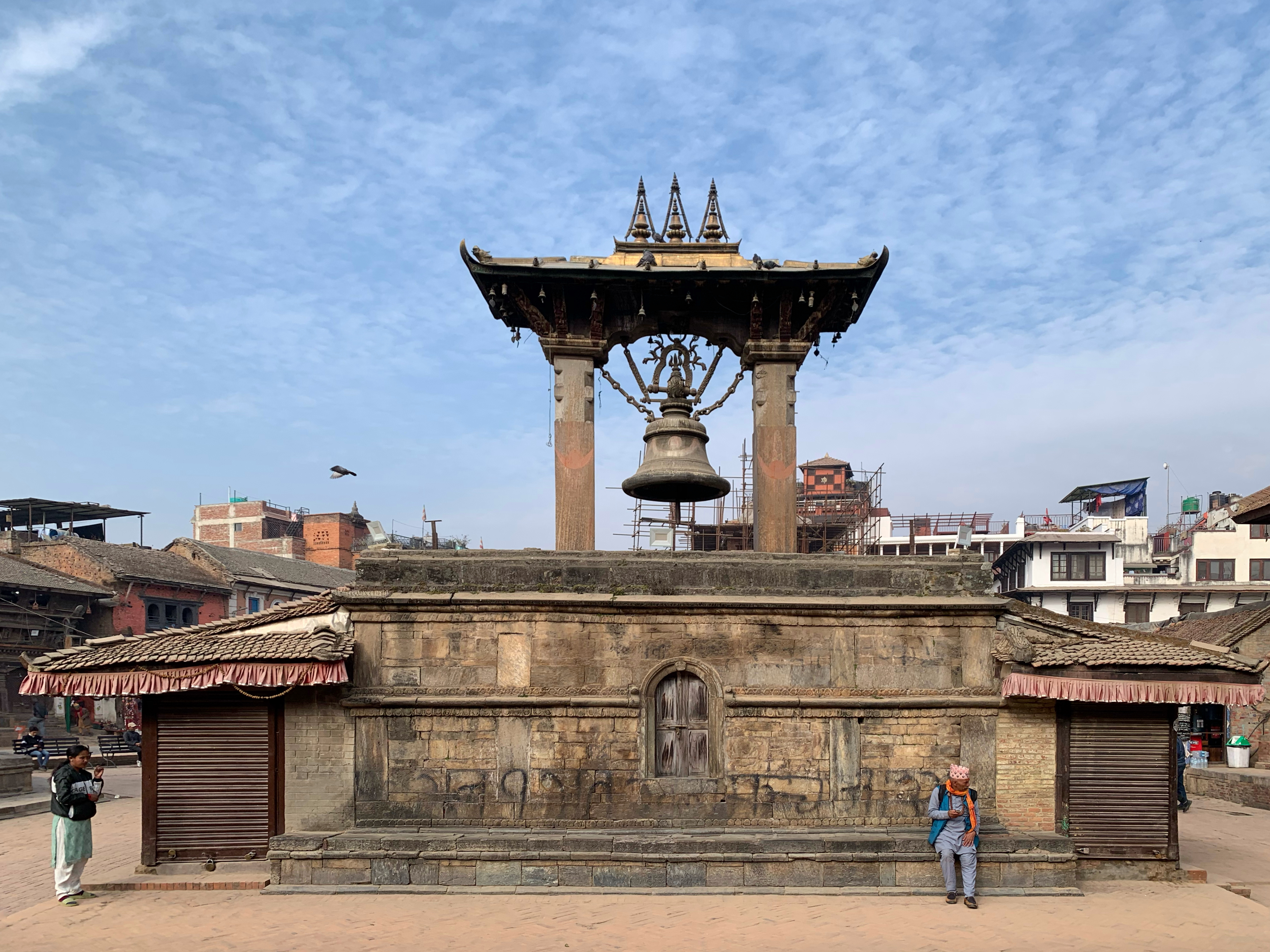
Big Bell

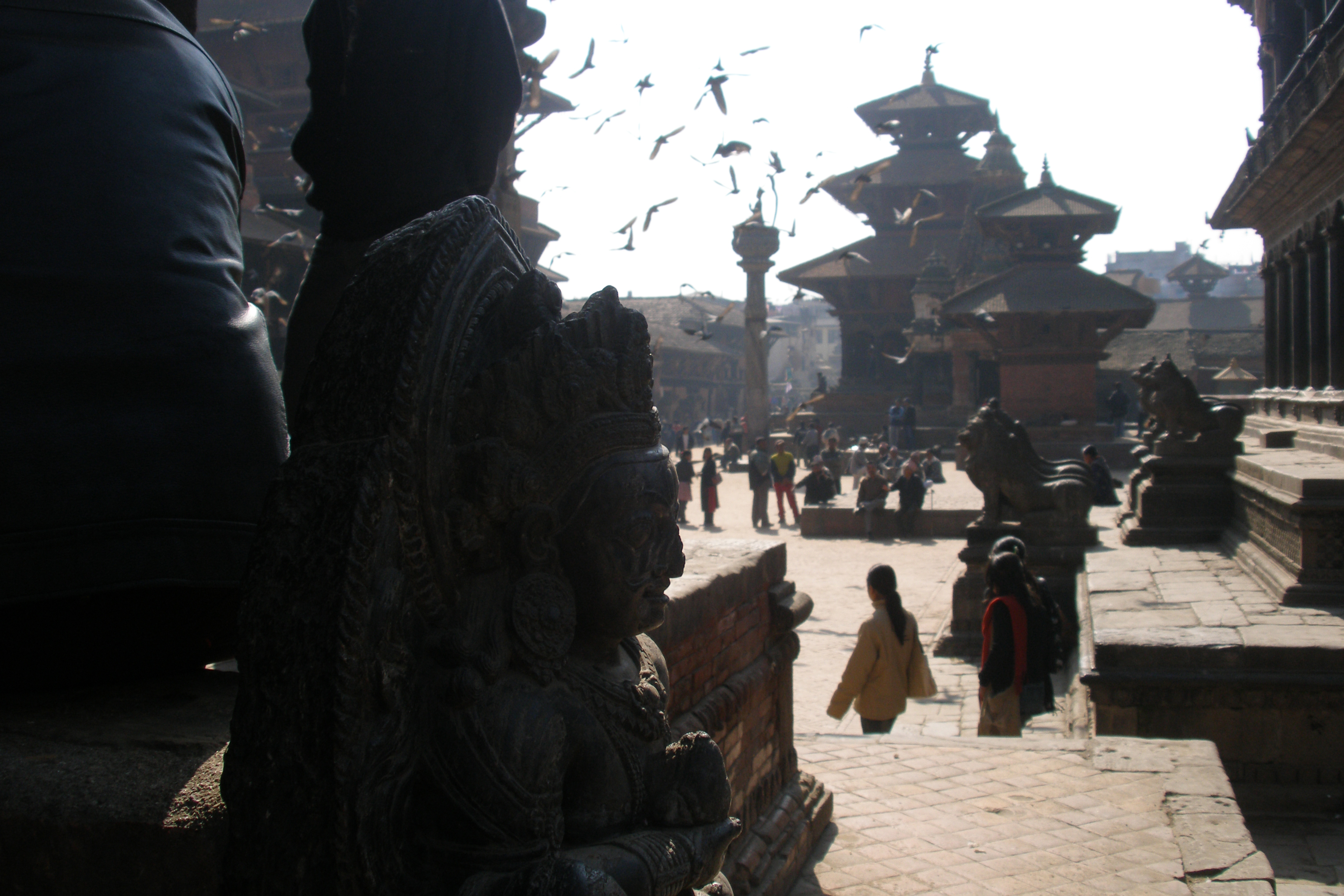

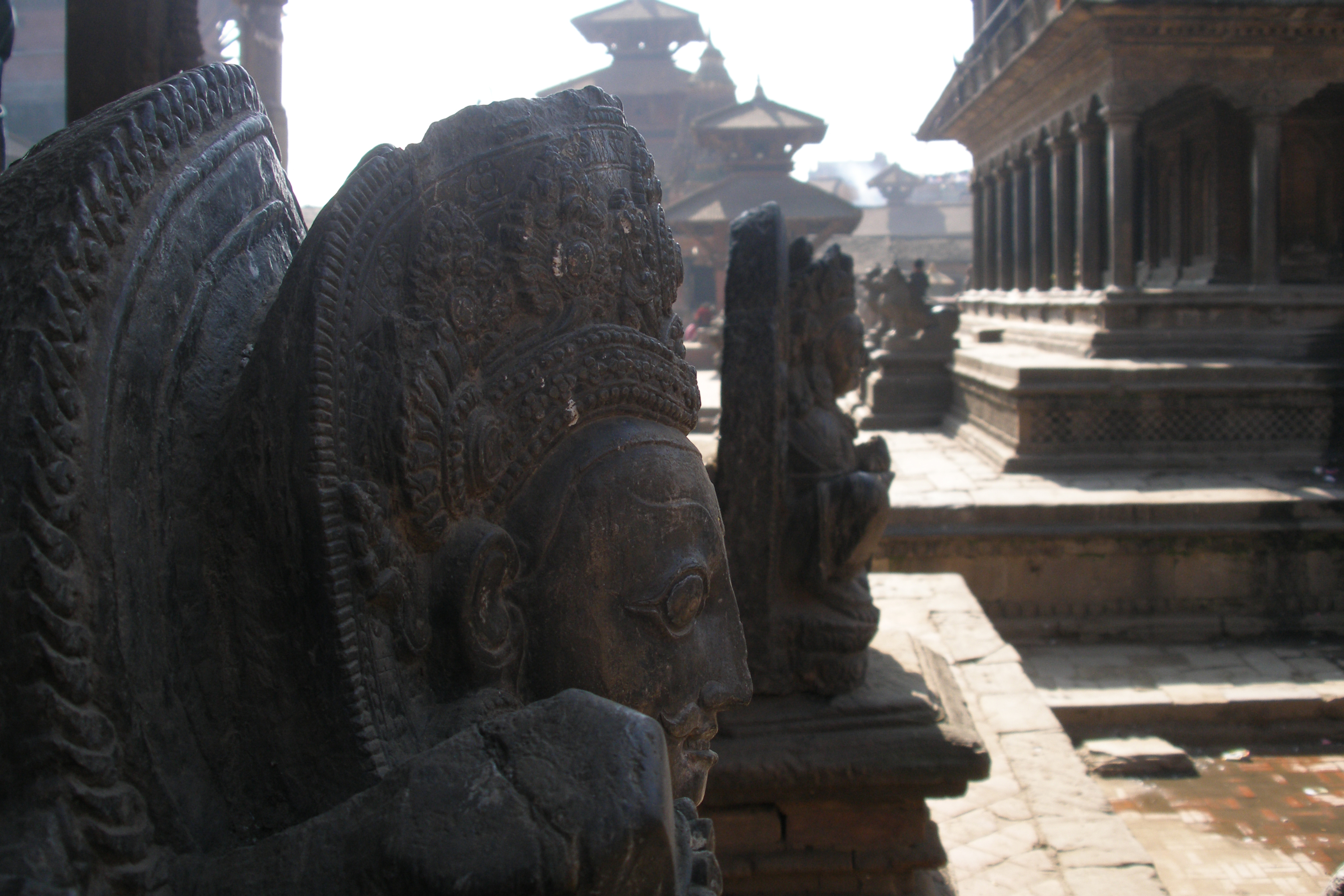

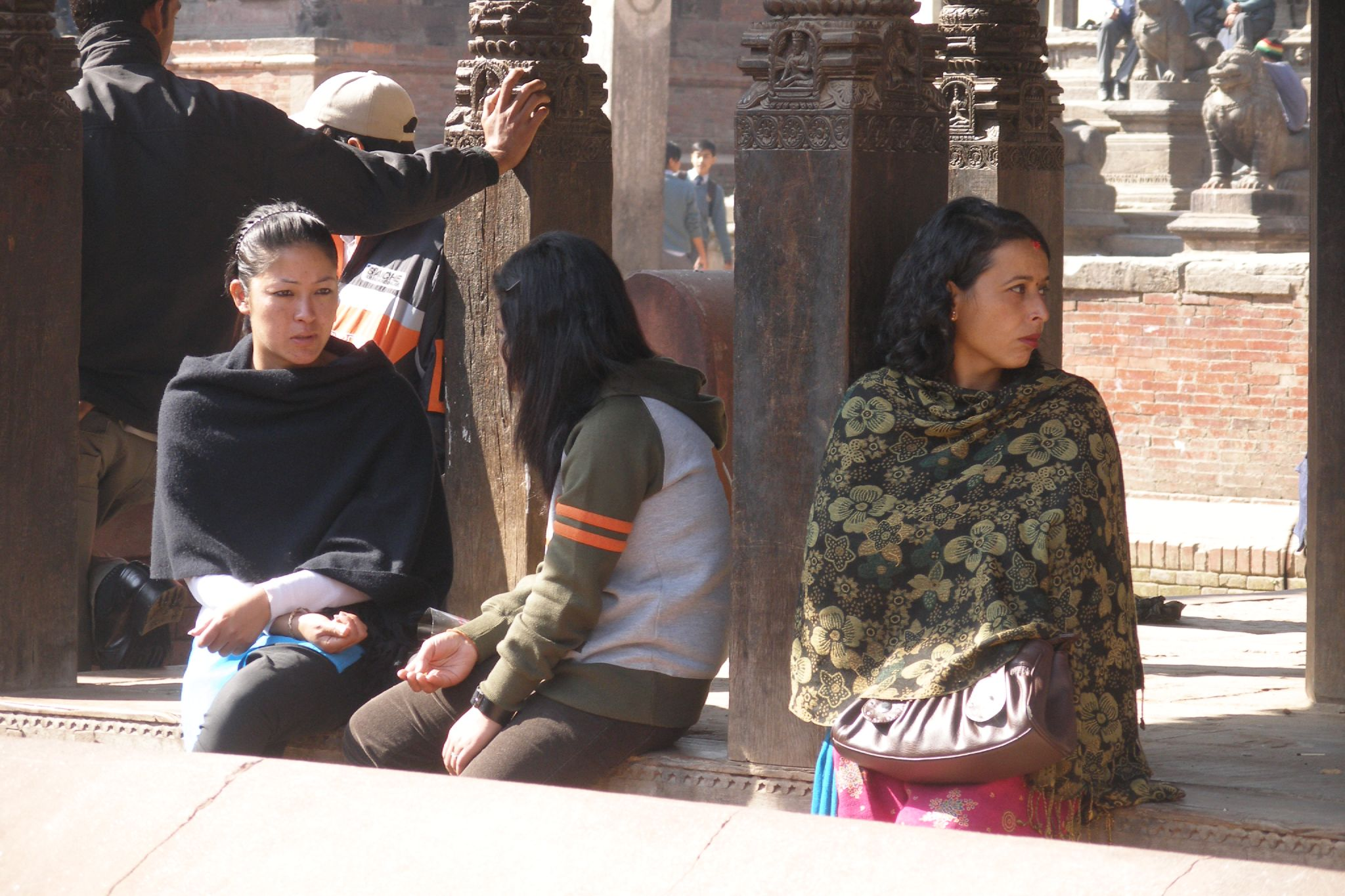

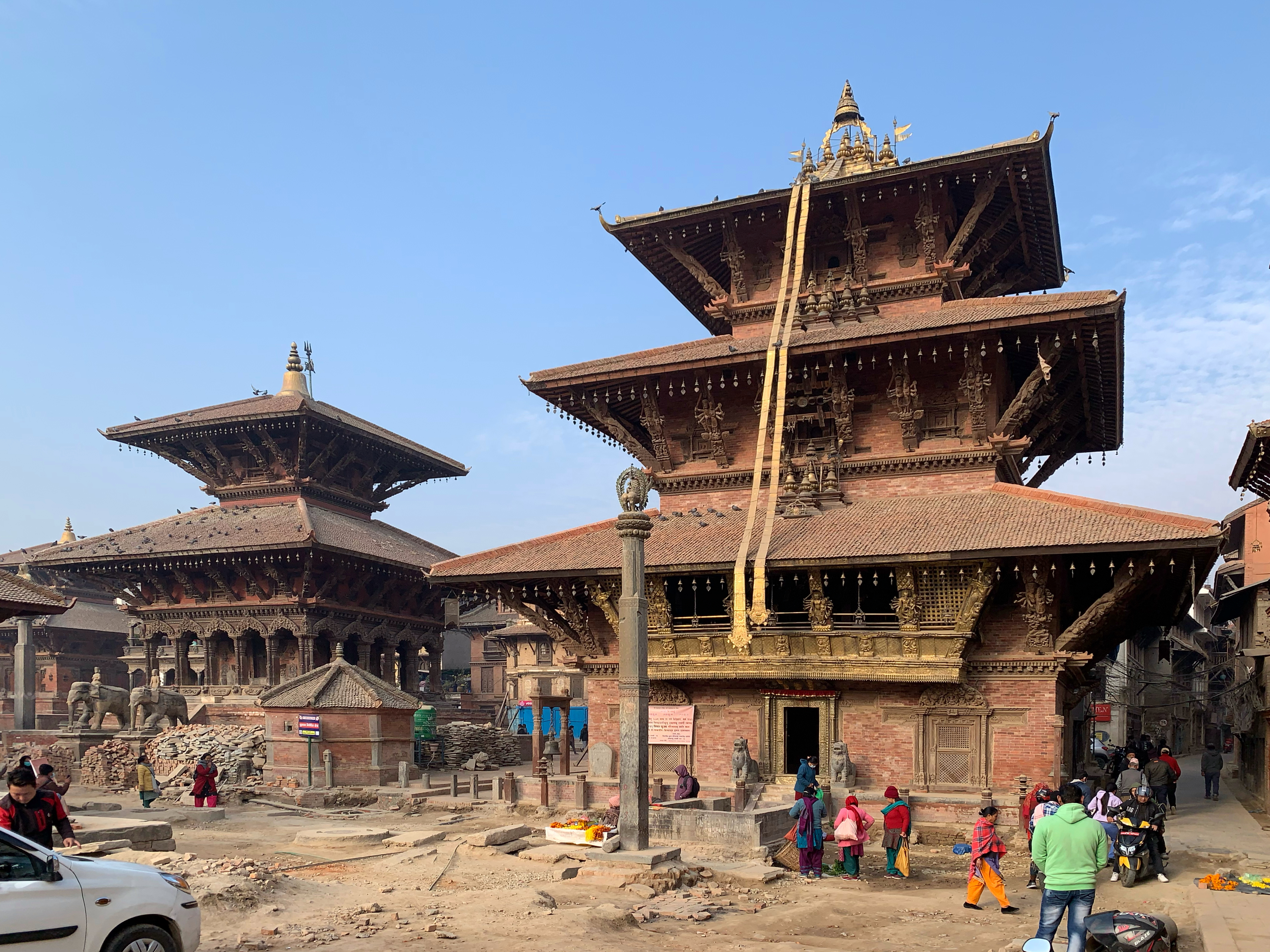
Bhimsen Temple (right), and Vishwanath Temple (left)

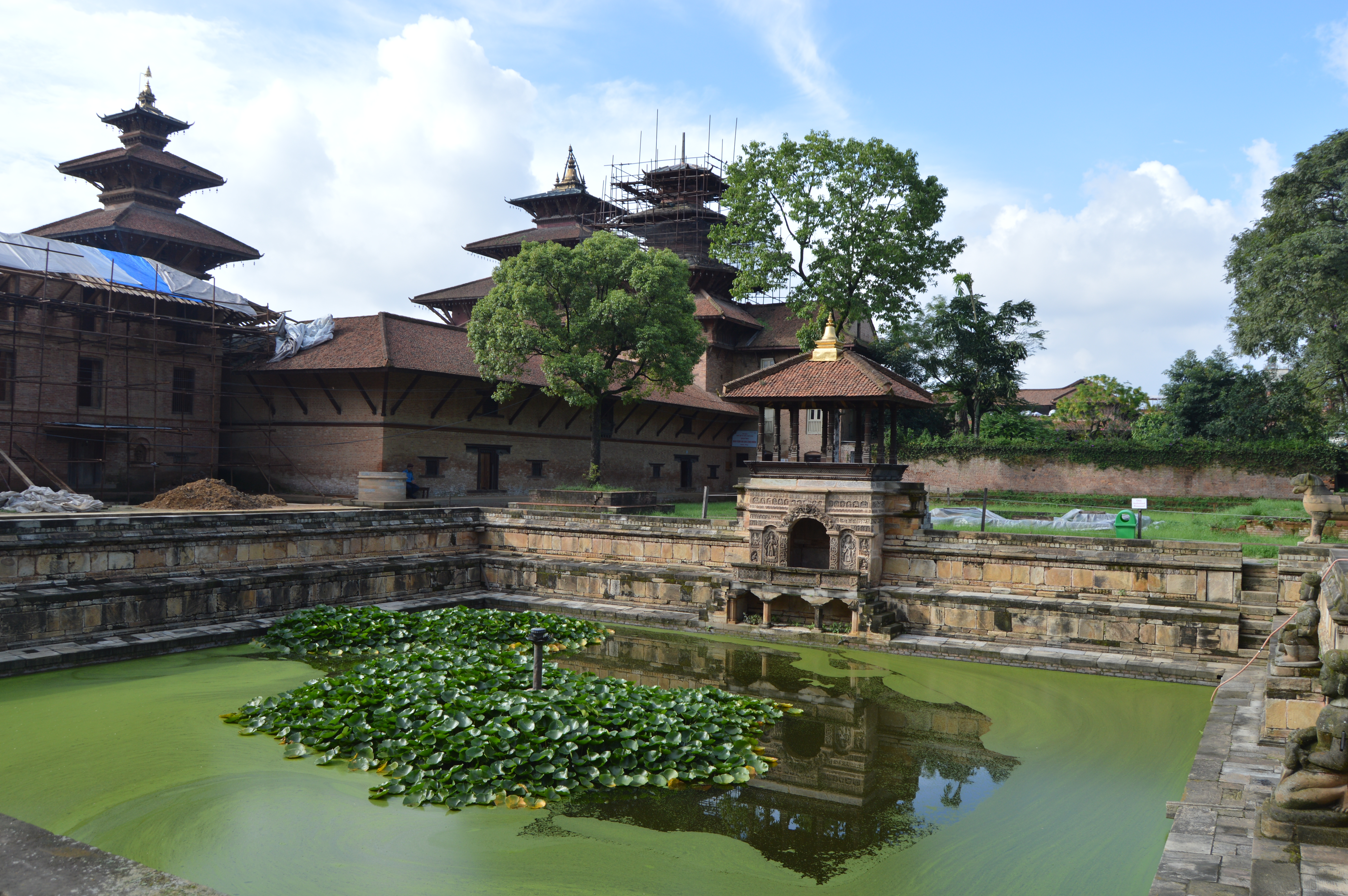
Bhandarkhal Garden and water tank

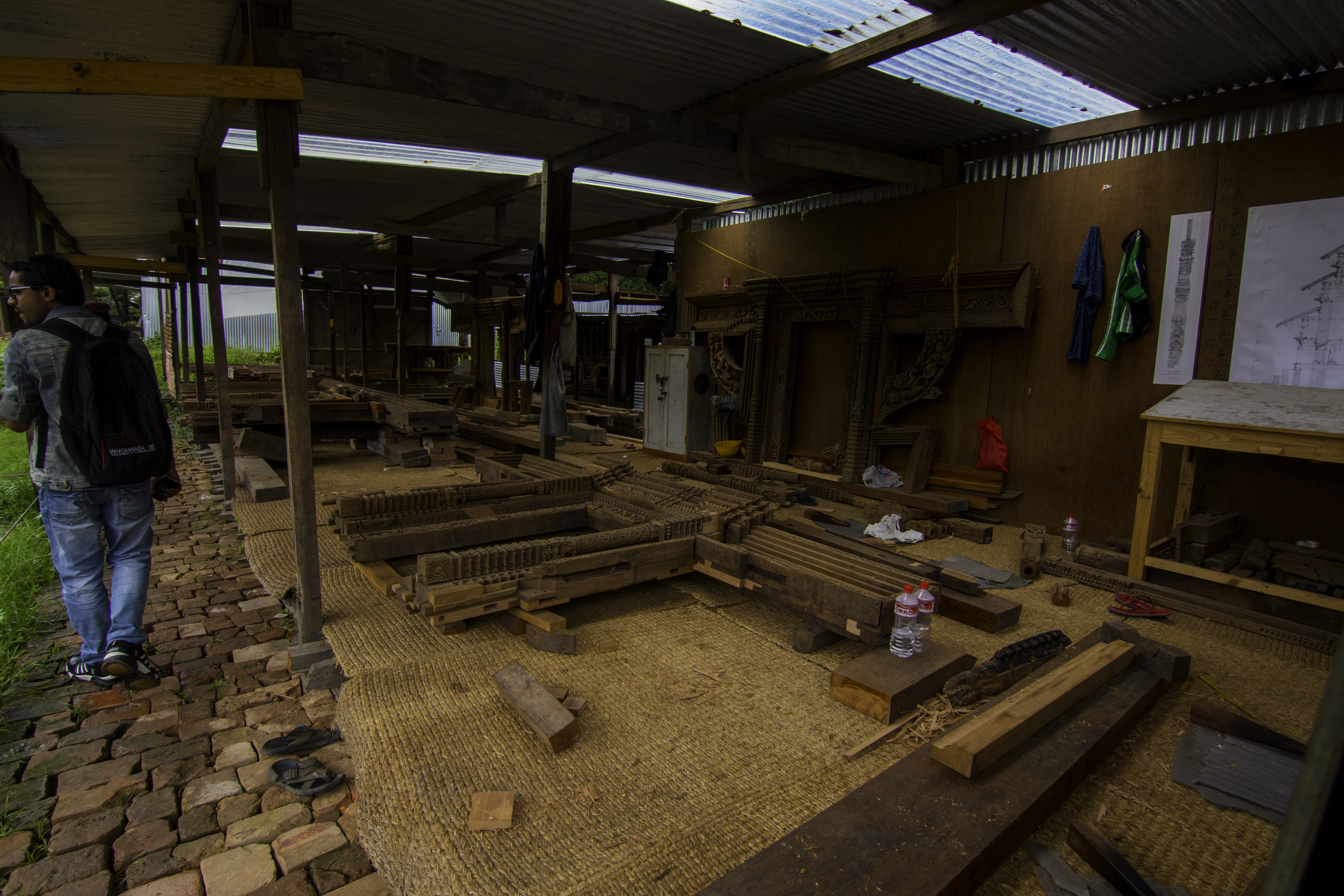
Under construction during renovation of Patan Durbar Square

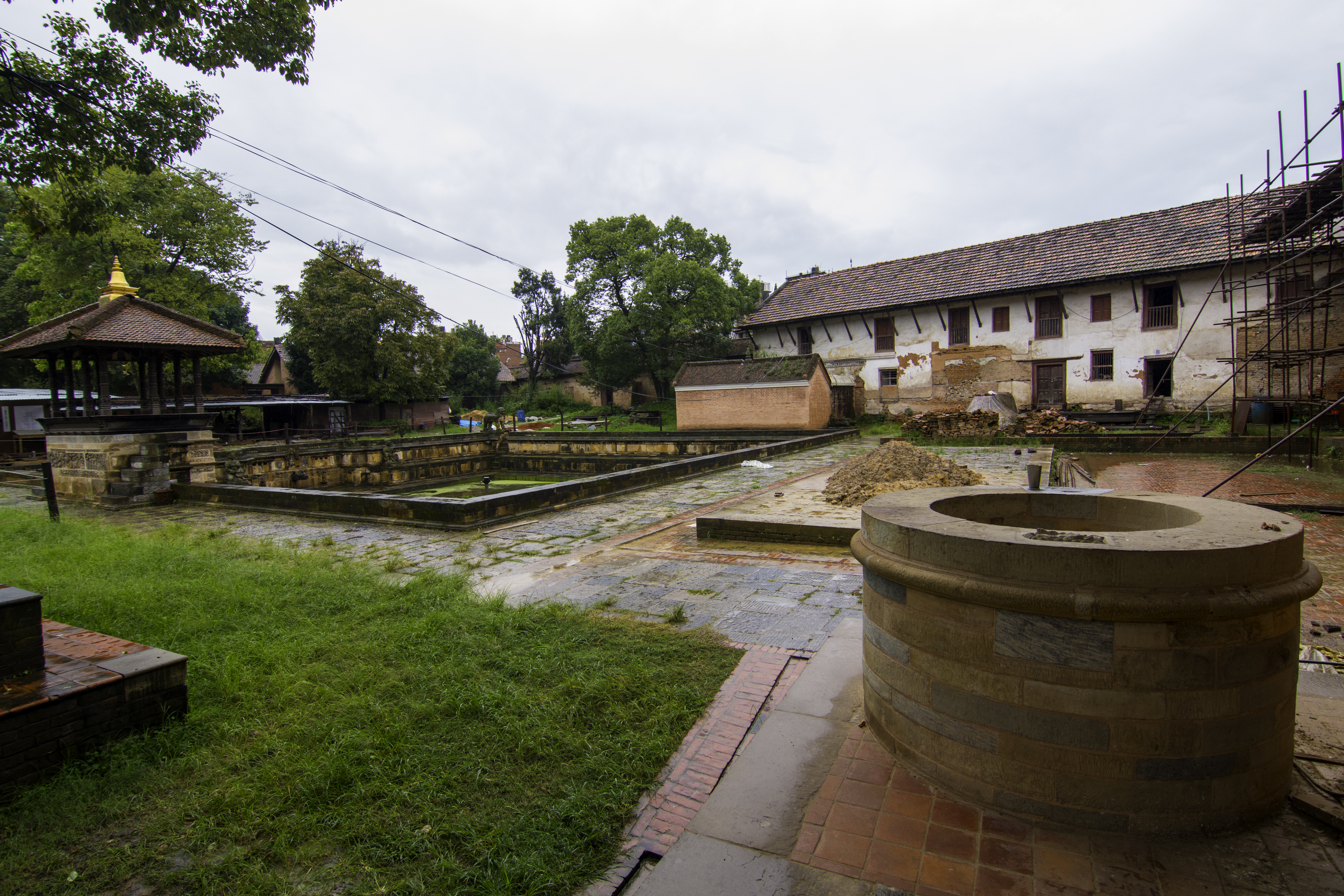

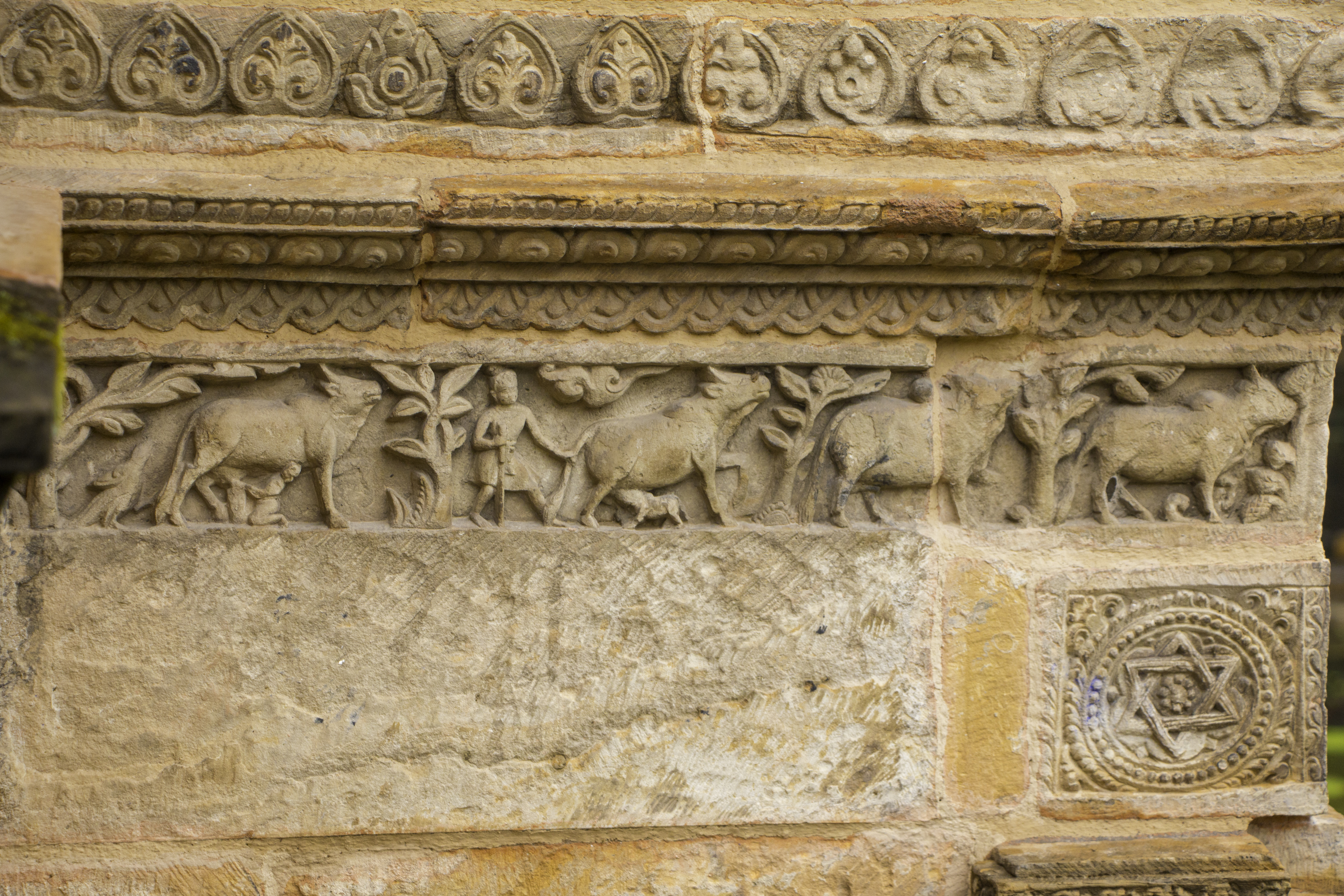
An agriculture stone sculpture inside the Patan Durbar Square

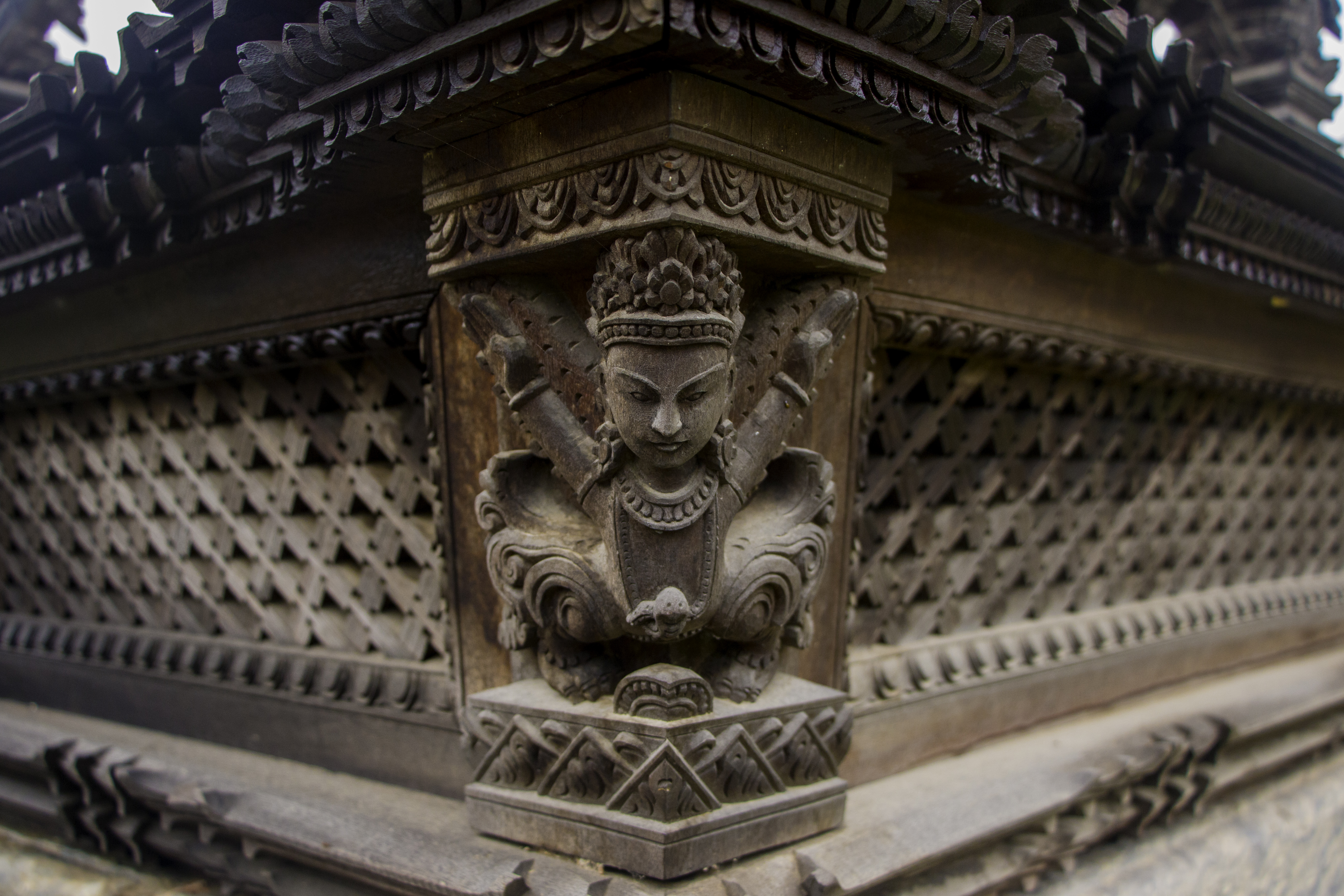

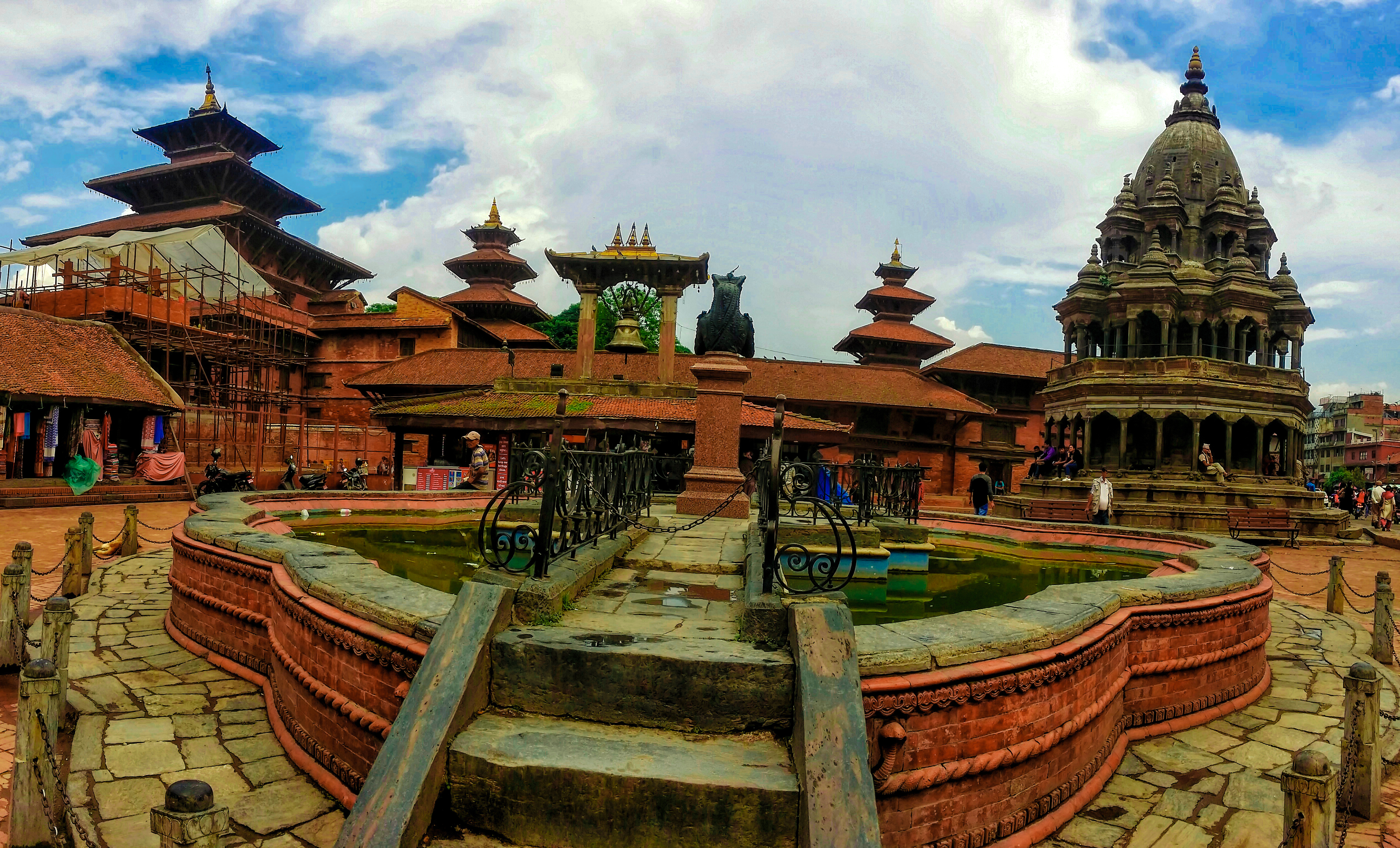

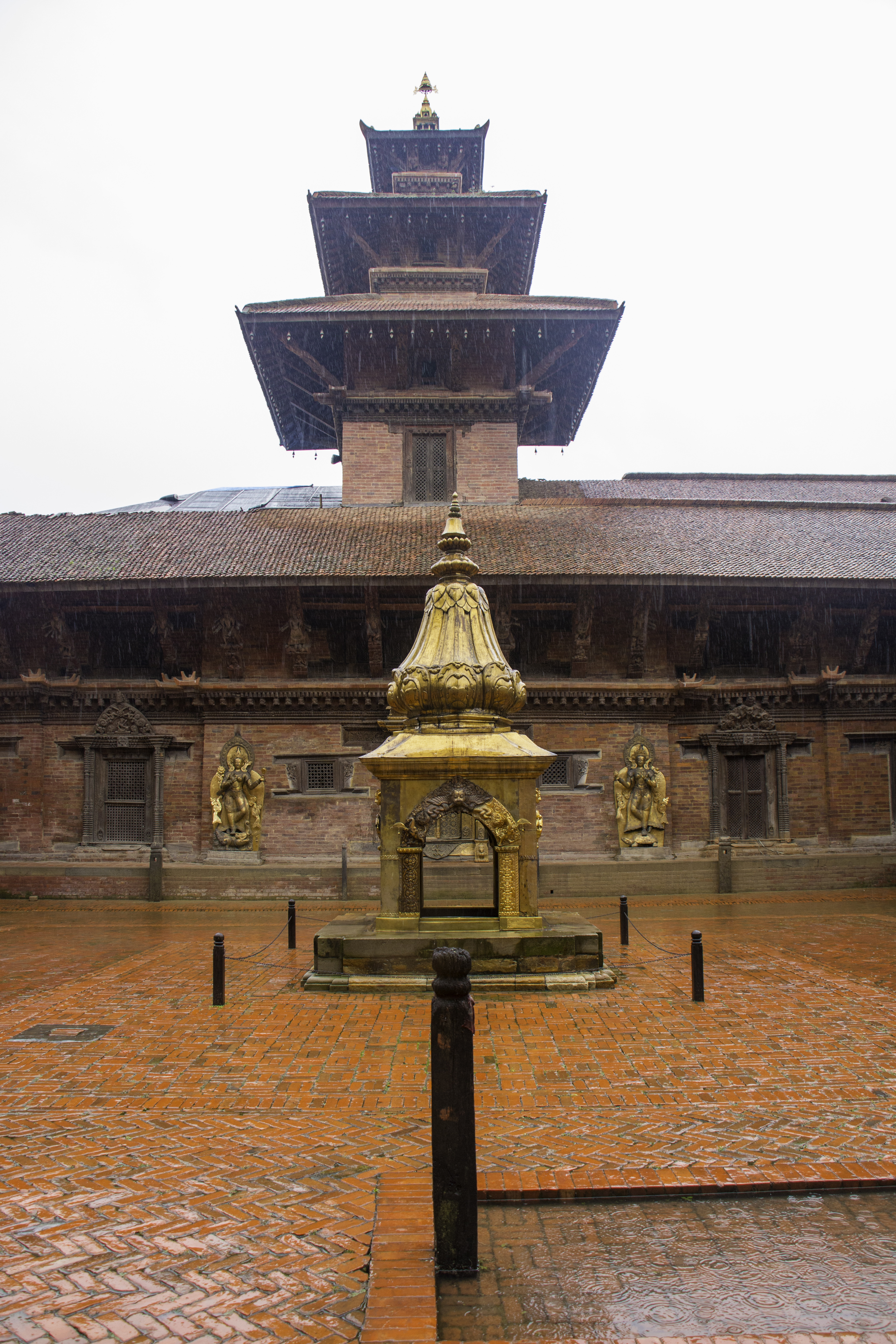

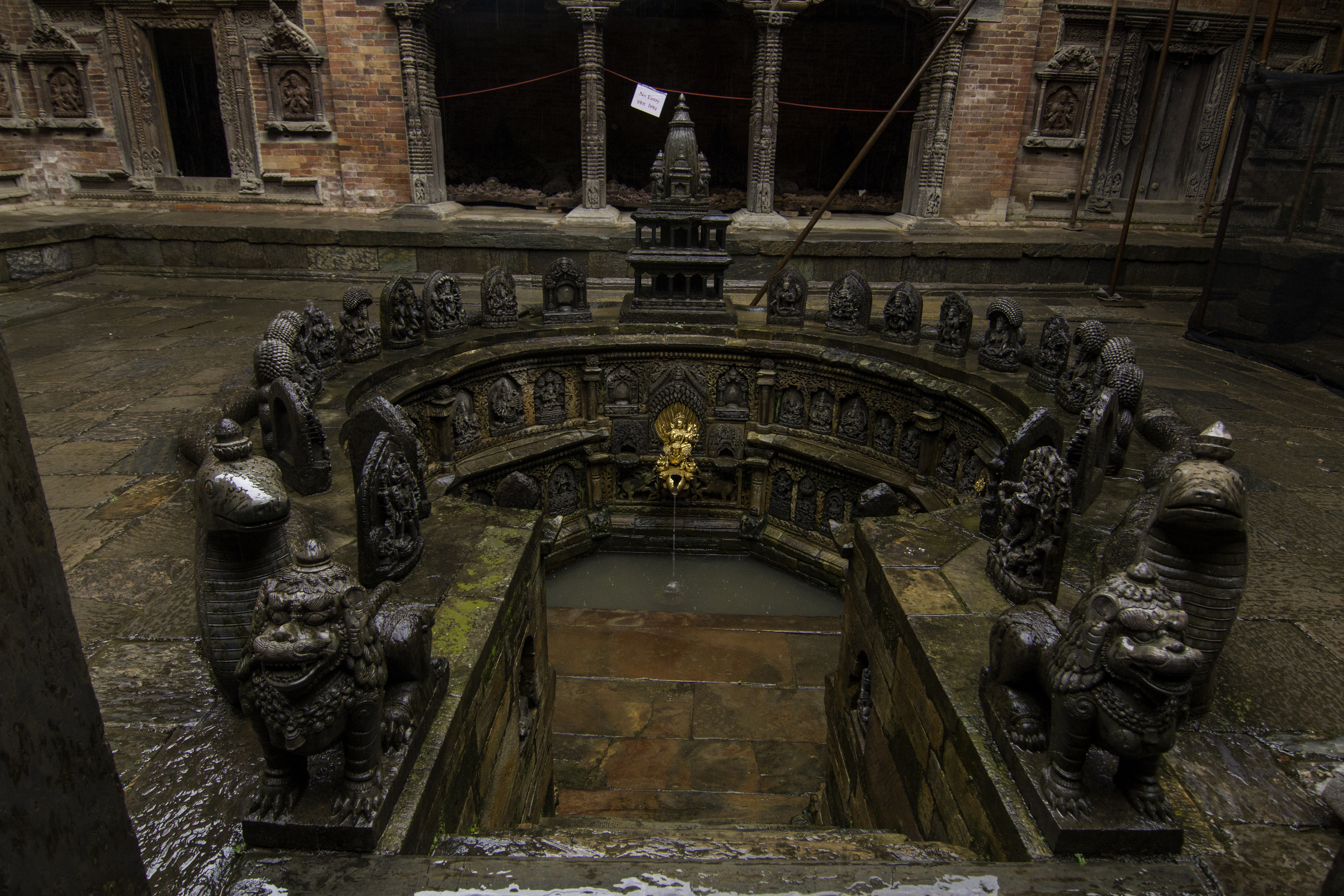

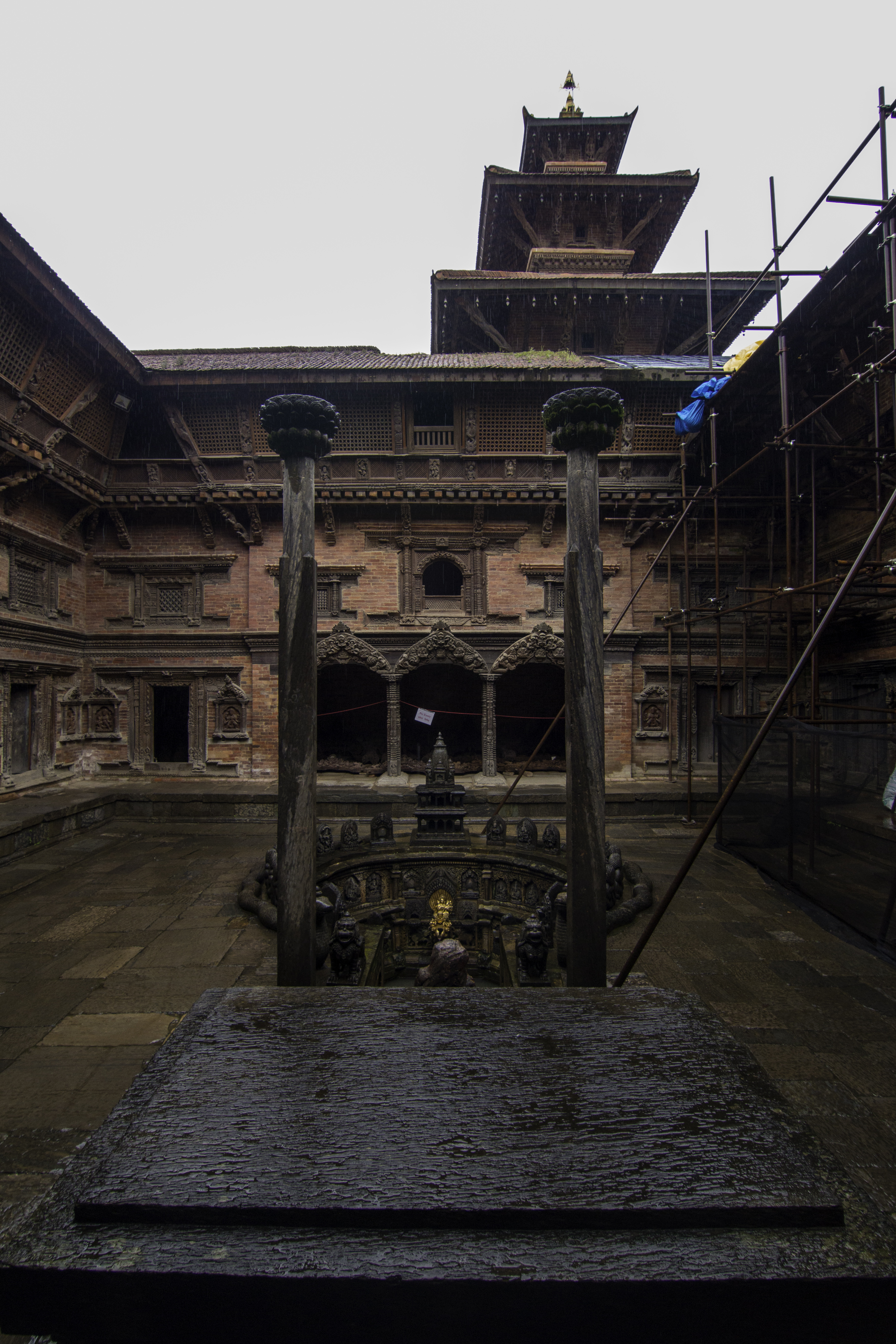

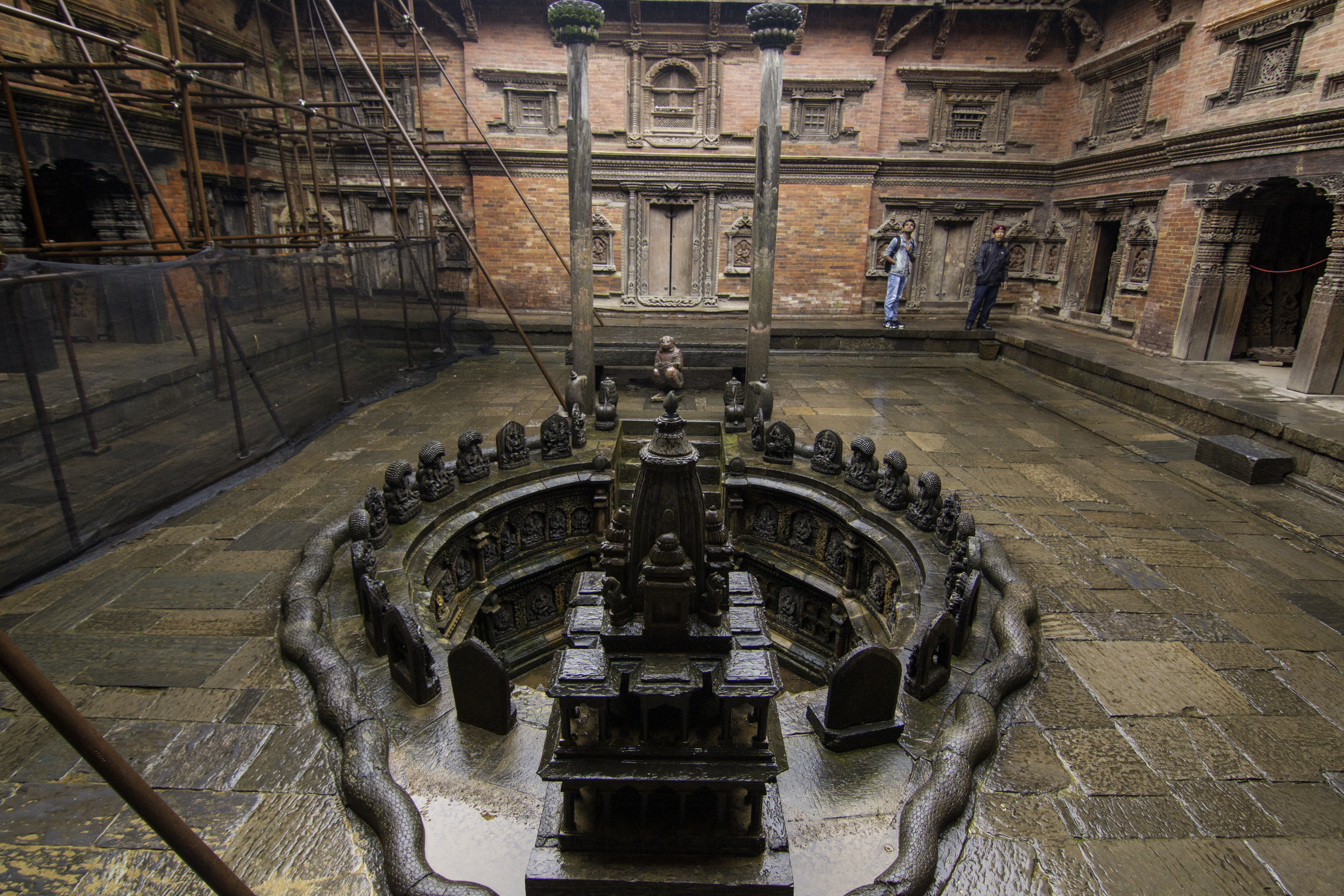

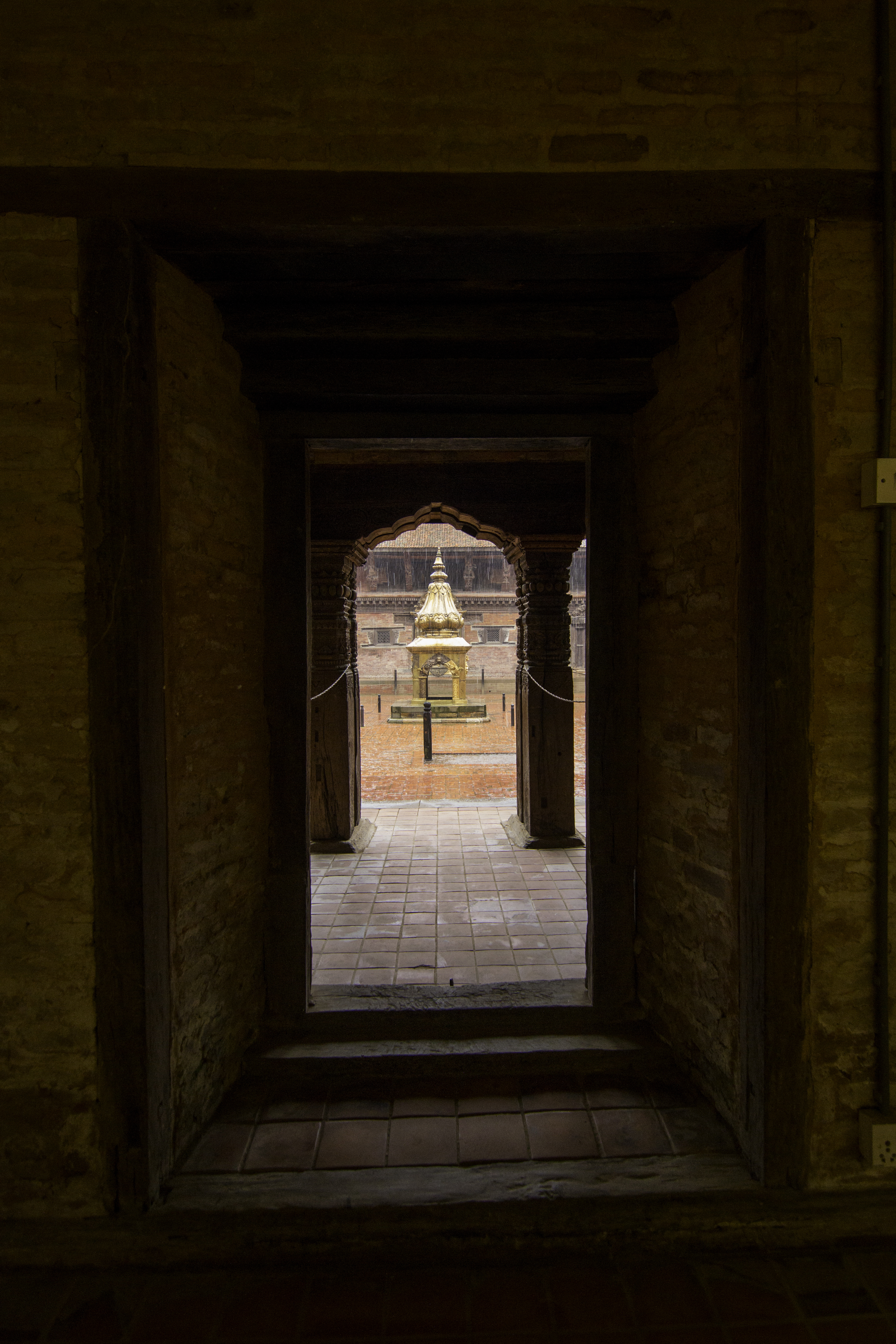

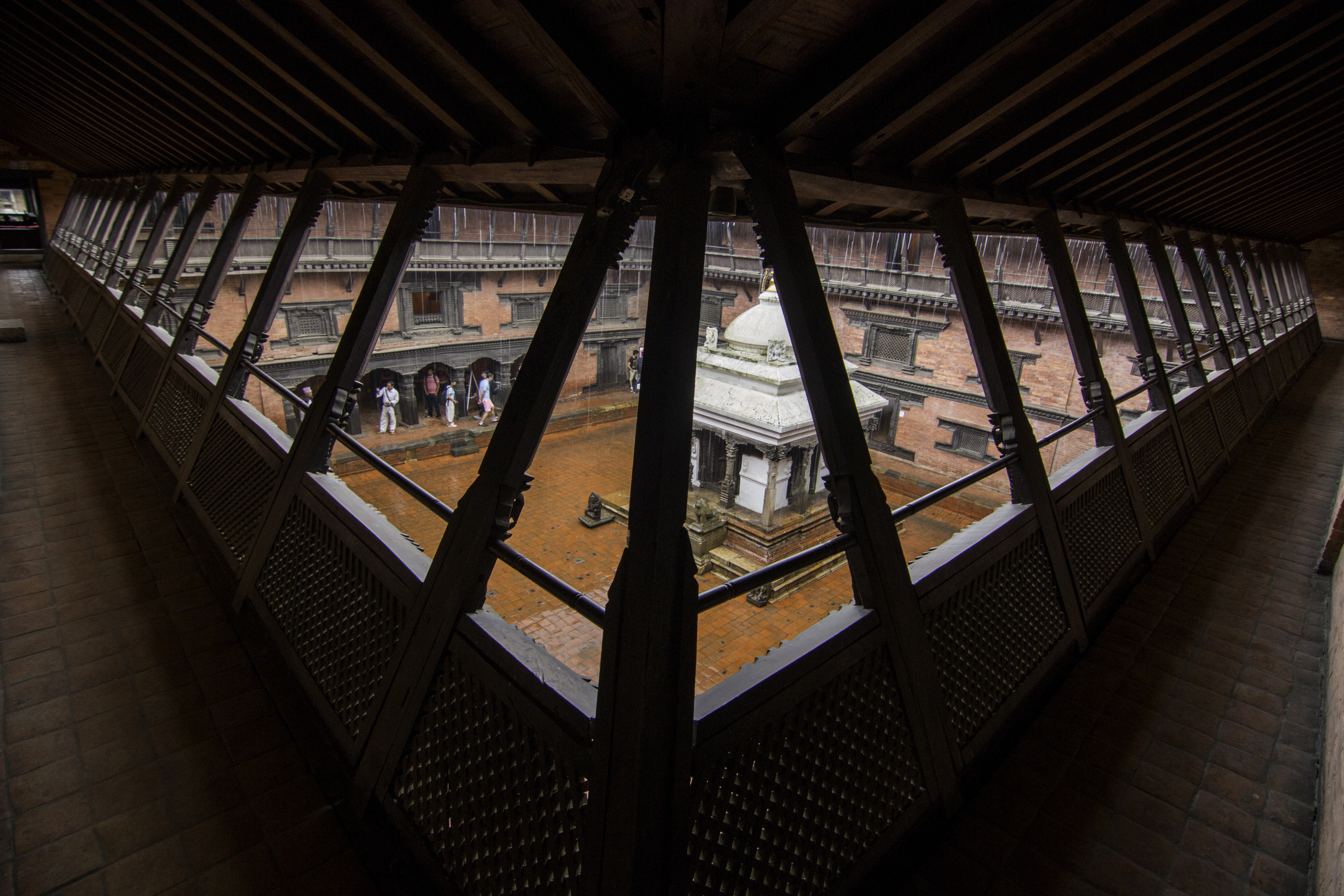

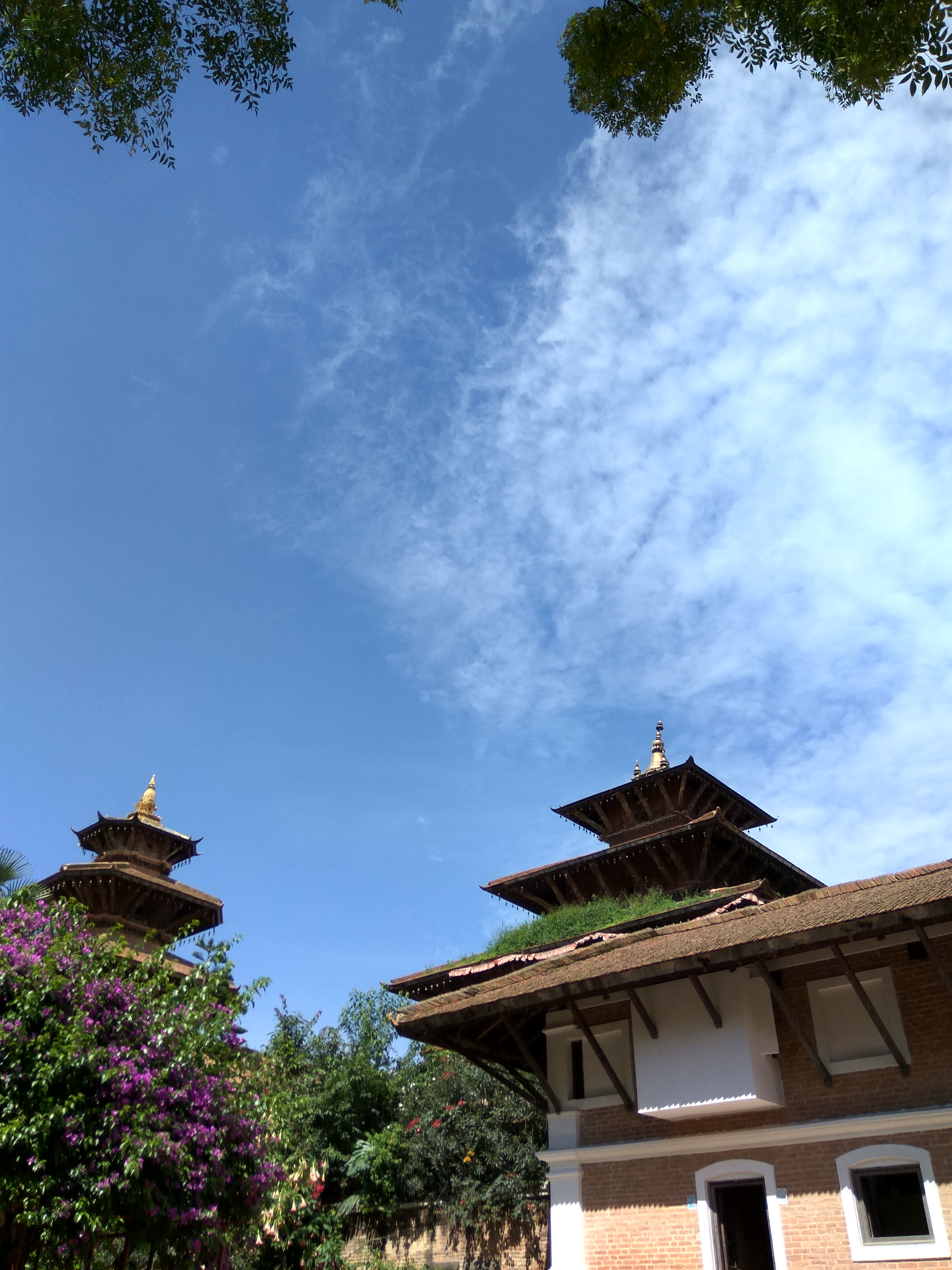

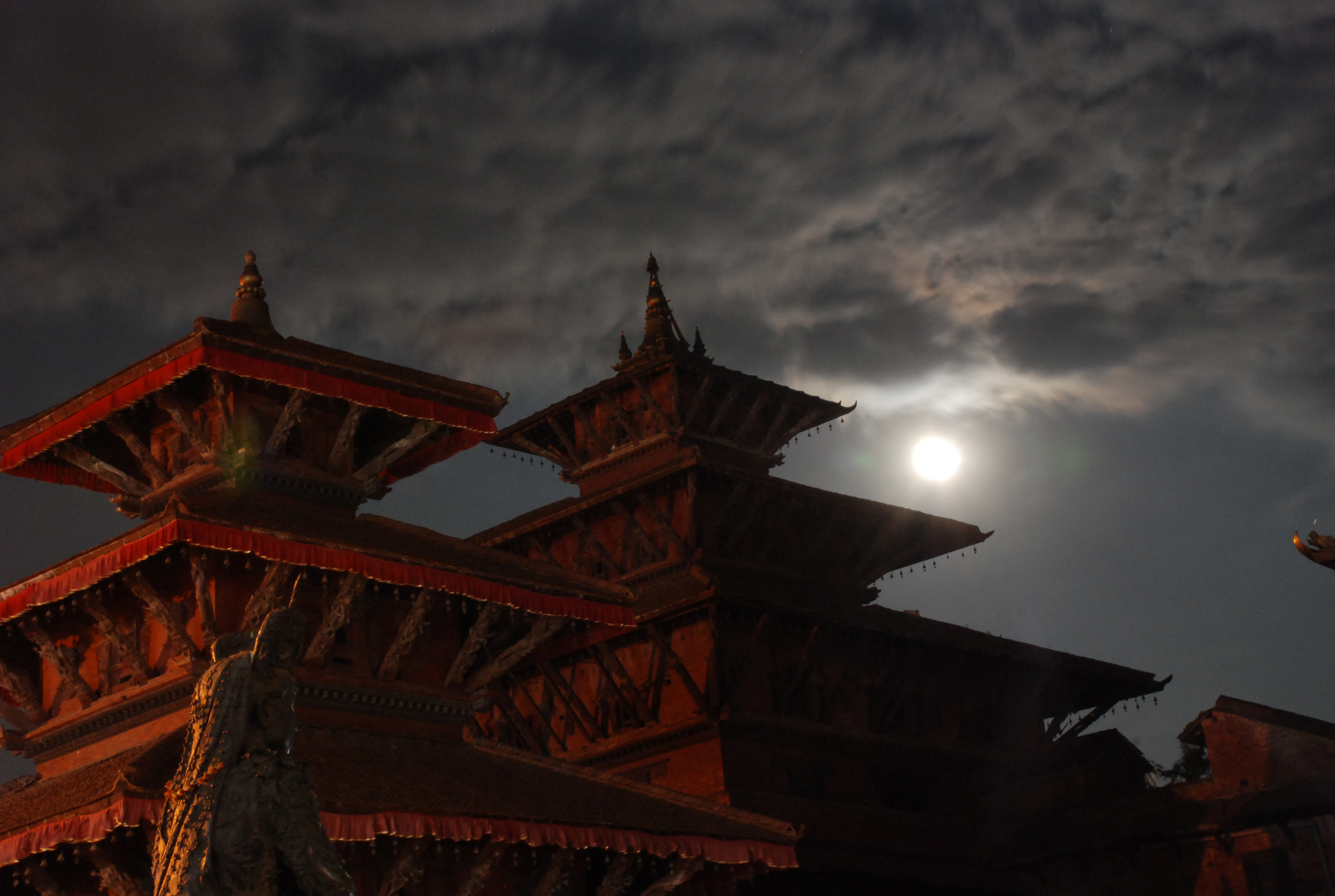
Patan Durbar Square as seen in the night

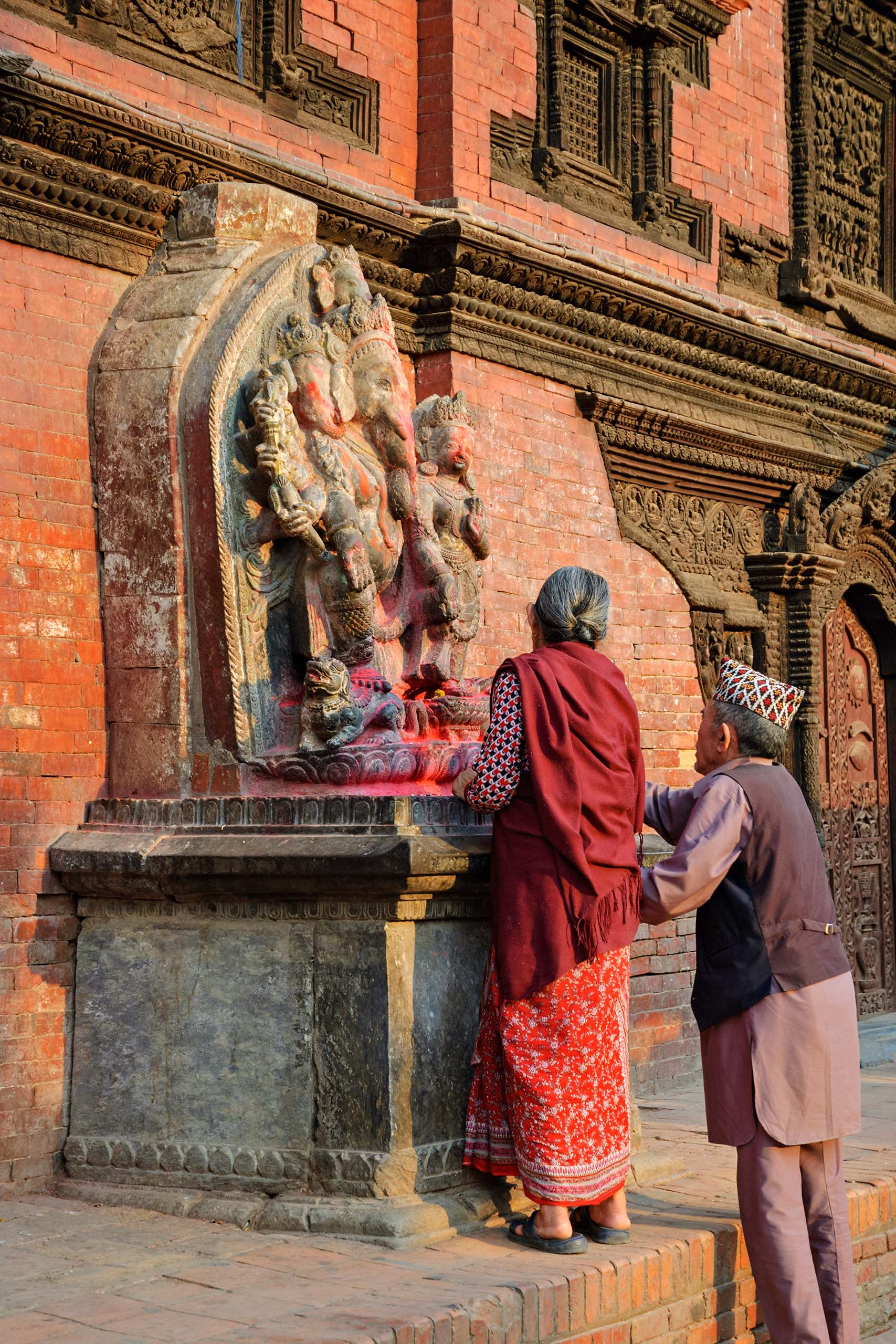
Patan Durbar Square woman and man worshipping Ganesh statue, Lalitpur, Nepal
