= Lakshmi Narasimha Malla =

17th-century King of Kantipur

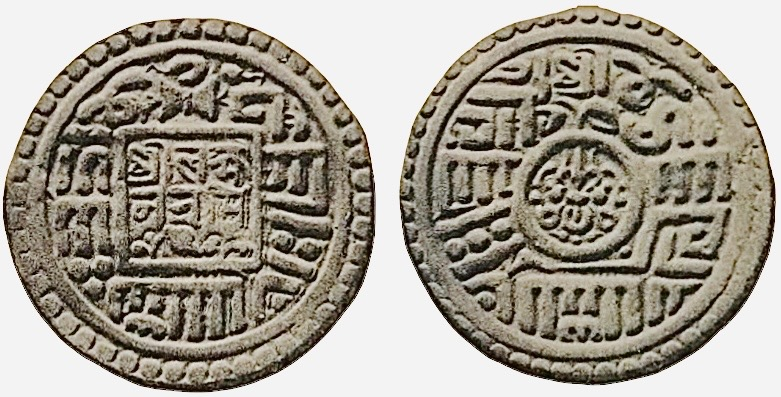
- Coin of Lakshmi Narasimha Malla with coin legend in the Newar script, 17th century.

King of Kantipur
- Reign: 1619–1641
- Predecessor: Shivasimha Malla
- Successor: Pratap Malla
- Issue: Pratap Malla
- Dynasty: Malla
- Father: Harihara Simha Malla
- Mother: Ganga Rani

Lakshmi Narasimha Malla (Newar: 𑐮𑐎𑑂𑐲𑑂𑐩𑐷 𑐣𑐬𑐳𑐶𑑄𑐴 𑐩𑐮𑑂𑐮), also spelled Lakshminarasimha or Laxminarasimha, was a Malla ruler and the seventh king of Kantipur. He was the youngest son of Harihara Simha and succeeded his grandfather Shivasimha Malla in 1619 as the King of Kantipur.

== Reign ==
The reign of Lakshminarasimha started when his grandfather Shivasimha Malla died in 1619. Kantipur had annexed Patan during the reign of Shivasimha Malla but after his death, Siddhi Narasimha Malla (Note: Siddhinarasimha and Lakshminarasimha were brothers; grandsons of Shivasimha Malla through Harihara Simha.) declared Patan independent and hence Laxminarasimha only ruled Kantipur.

Lakshminarasimha had a Kaji (minister) named Bhima Malla. Bhima Malla was sent to Tibet to negotiate a trade treaty. He succeeded in concluding a favorable treaty to Kantipur but after his return, other ministers conspired and accused him of trying to replace the King. The conspirators were successful, and Bhima Malla was sent to death. The then tradition dictated that his wife be burnt along in her husband's pyre (Sati). It is said that she, about to be burnt, cursed the entire country. Due to that event, Nepal is also called Sati le sarapeko desh (land cursed by Sati).

Soon afterwards, the King realized his mistake of sentencing Bhima Malla to death. It greatly depressed him and later on he went insane. He was imprisoned by his son Pratap Malla under the grounds of insanity who ruled Kantipur until 1674.

Preceded by Shivasimha Malla	King of Kantipur; 1619–1641	Succeeded by Pratap Malla
