= Mahendra Malla =

16th-century King of Kantipur

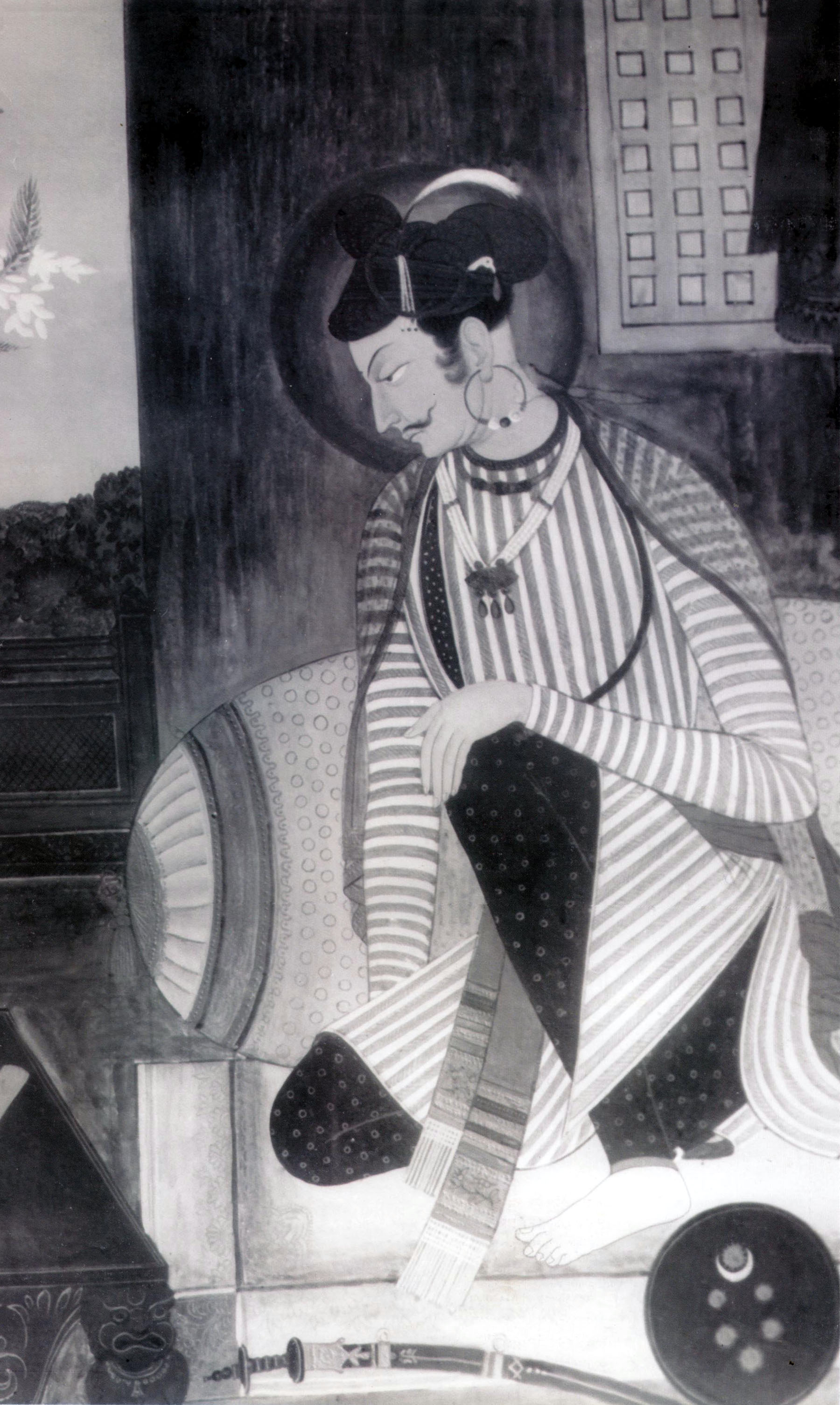
- Portrait of Mahendra Malla located at the Jana bahal monastery.

King of Kantipur
- Reign: 1560–1574
- Predecessor: Amara Malla
- Successor: Sadashiva Malla
- Died: 29 August 1574; Nepal
- Issue: Sadashiva Malla; Shivasimha Malla
- Dynasty: Malla
- Father: Amara Malla

Mahendra Malla (Newar: 𑐩𑐴𑐾𑐣𑑂𑐡𑑂𑐬 𑐩𑐮𑑂𑐮) was a king of the Malla dynasty and the fourth king of Kantipur. He succeeded his father Amara Malla and ruled from 1560 to 1574. He is regarded as the first poet in the Newar language.

== Reign ==
During his reign, Mahendra Malla attempted to develop the economy and trade of his kingdom and thus distributed lands to the people and to different temples. He also built the Taleju Temple situated in Kathmandu.

He issued the first silver mohar coins during his reign and because of this, the coins were called mahendramallis for a long time.

Mahendra Malla's son Bharu Malla went to 24 states. He died on NS 894 bhadra sukla 3, translating to 29 August 1574 and was succeeded by his son Sadashiva Malla.

== Literary work ==
Mahendra Malla was the first poet (Adikavi) in the Newar language. His poem Kapaṭi māyānaṃ kenyā he Rāma is considered the first poem written in the Newar language.

Preceded by Amara Malla	King of Kantipur; 1530–1560	Succeeded by Sadashiva Malla
