= Sadashiva Malla =

16th-century King of Kantipur

King of Kantipur
- Reign: 1574–1578
- Predecessor: Mahendra Malla
- Deposed by: Shivasimha Malla
- Died: 1581; Bhadgaon
- Dynasty: Malla
- Father: Mahendra Malla

Sadashiva Malla (Newar: 𑐳𑐡𑐵𑐱𑐶𑐰 𑐩𑐮𑑂𑐮) was a king of the Malla dynasty and the fifth king of Kantipur. He succeeded his father Mahendra Malla and ruled from 1574 to 1578.

== Reign ==
Sadashiva Malla succeeded as the King of Kantipur after the death of Mahendra Malla. He was involved in extreme profligacy and a feeling of resentment arose among the public during his short reign. He was supposedly once captured and beaten severely by the public.

He was eventually driven out of Kantipur by his brother and the general public, and he took shelter in Bhadgaon, where his forced exile lasted until he died in 1581. After his deposition, his brother, Shivasimha Malla, took charge of the kingdom and expanded the territory of Kantipur.

Preceded by Mahendra Malla	King of Kantipur; 1574–1578	Succeeded by Shivasimha Malla
