= Krishna Mandir, Patan =

Hindu temple in Lalitpur, Nepal

Krishna Mandir
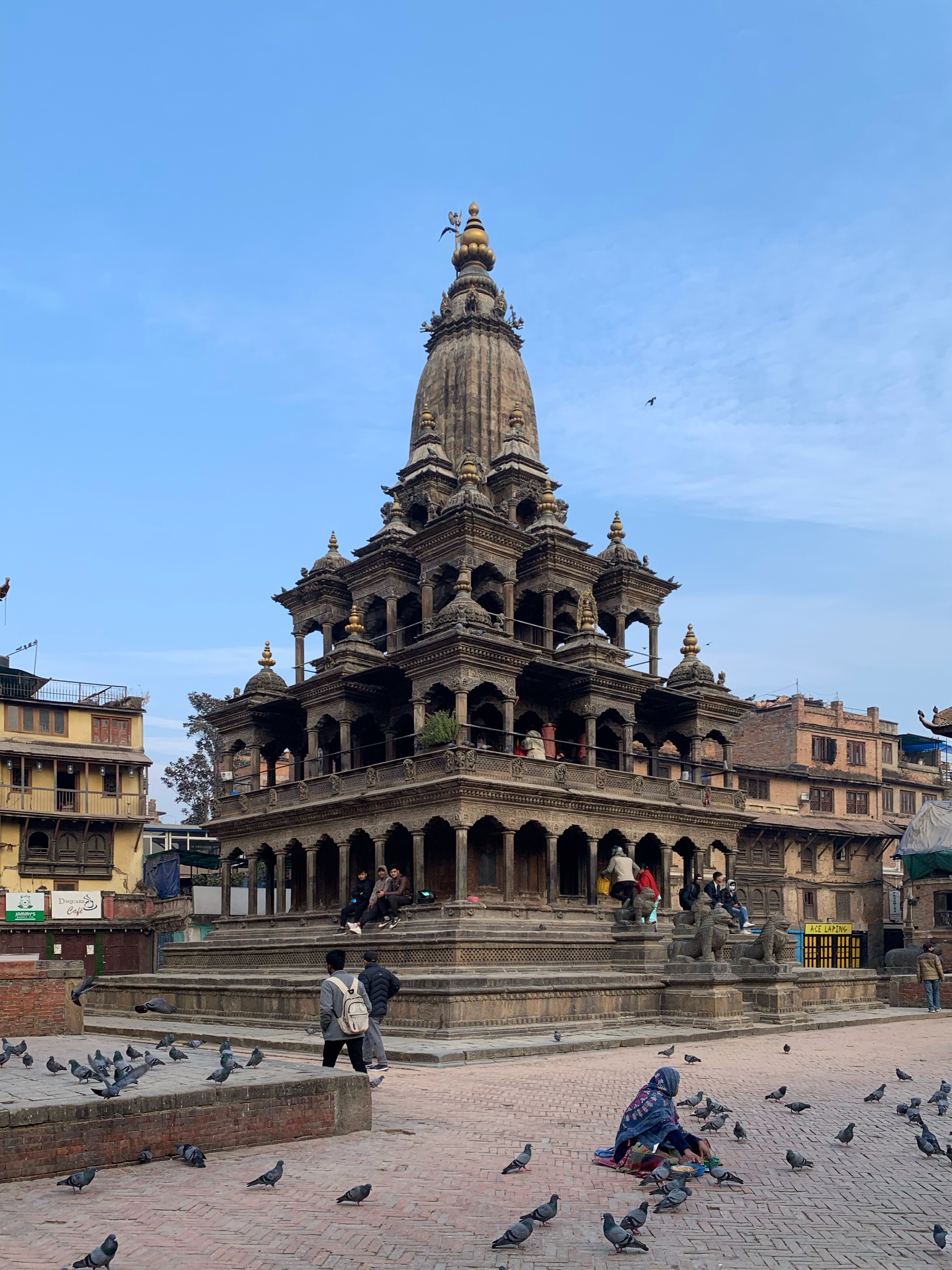
- Krishna Mandir in 2023

- Location within Nepal

Religion
- Affiliation: Hinduism
- District: Lalitpur
- Deity: Rukmini Krishna Satyabhama
- Festival: Krishna Janmashtami

Location
- Location: Patan
- State: Bagmati Province
- Country: Nepal
- Interactive map of Krishna Mandir
- Coordinates: 27°40′25″N 85°19′30″E

Krishna Mandir is a 17th-century Shikhara-style temple built by King Siddhi Narsing Malla. It is located at the Patan Durbar Square, a UNESCO World Heritage Site, in the city of Lalitpur in Nepal. It was damaged by the Nepal earthquake of April 2015, and was later restored in 2018.
