= Siva Simha Malla =

16th-century King of Kantipur and Patan

Shiva Simha Malla
- King of Kantipur and Patan
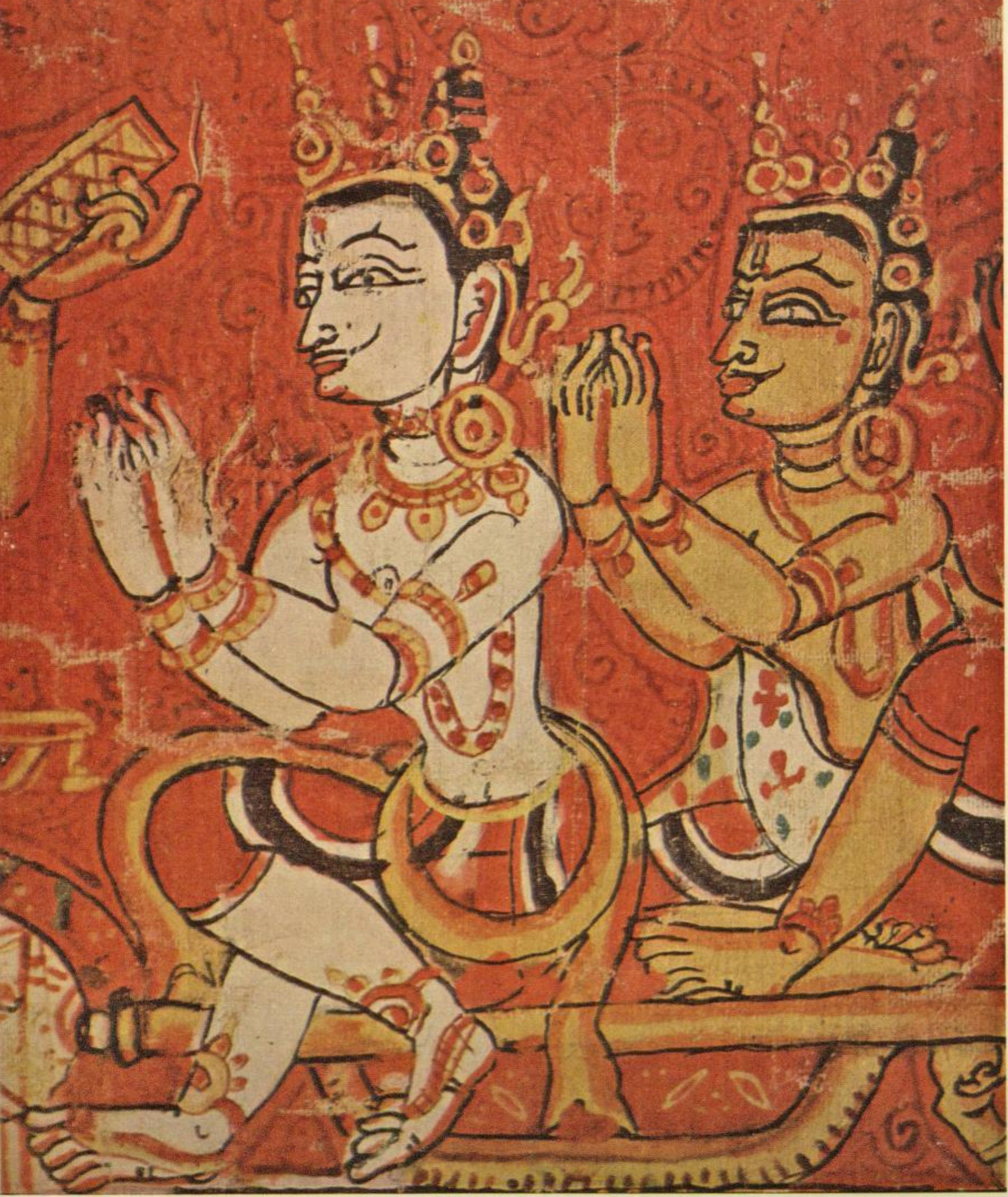
- A possible portrait of Shivasimha Malla with his minister, dated 1617

King of Kantipur
- Reign: 1578–1619
- Predecessor: Sadashiva Malla
- Successor: Lakshmi Narasimha Malla

King of Patan
- Reign: 1600–1619
- Predecessor: Purandar Simha
- Successor: Siddhi Narasimha Malla
- Born: Nepal
- Died: 1619; Nepal
- Spouse: Ganga Rani
- Children: Harihara Simha Malla
- Dynasty: Malla
- Father: Mahendra Malla

Siva Simha Malla (Newar: 𑐱𑐶𑐰 𑐳𑐶𑑄𑐴 𑐩𑐮𑑂𑐮), also known as Shiva Simha or Shivasimha, was a Malla ruler and the sixth king of Kantipur. He started his reign on 1578 after deposing his brother Sadashiva Malla.

== Life ==
His brother, Sadashiva Malla, was a decadent King and was deposed by Shivasimha Malla and the general public in 1578 and forced into exile to Bhadgaon. Shivasimha was then crowned as the King of Kantipur

Shivasimha Malla was of simple nature, but an ambitious king. He annexed Patan in around 1600 which was then ruled by the descendants of Vishnusimha since the time of disintegration after Yakshya Malla. He then conquered Dolakha and brought it under the control of Kantipur.

He first installed his son Harihara Simha as the governor of Patan. Harihara Simha died shortly afterwards, and his eldest son Siddhi Narasimha Malla was the governor of Patan.

== Succession ==
After the death of Shivasimha in 1619, Lakshmi Narasimha Malla, another son of Harihara Simha, succeeded him as the King of Kantipur, and Siddhi Narasimha Malla declared Patan independent from Kantipur. Thus, the kingdoms of Kantipur and Patan united by Shivasimha were divided again by his grandsons.

| Preceded by Sadashiva Malla | King of Kantipur; 1578–1619 | Succeeded by Lakshmi Narasimha Malla |

| Preceded by Purandar Simha | King of Patan; 1600–1619 | Succeeded by Siddhi Narasimha Malla |
