= Siddhi Narasimha Malla =

17th-century King of Patan

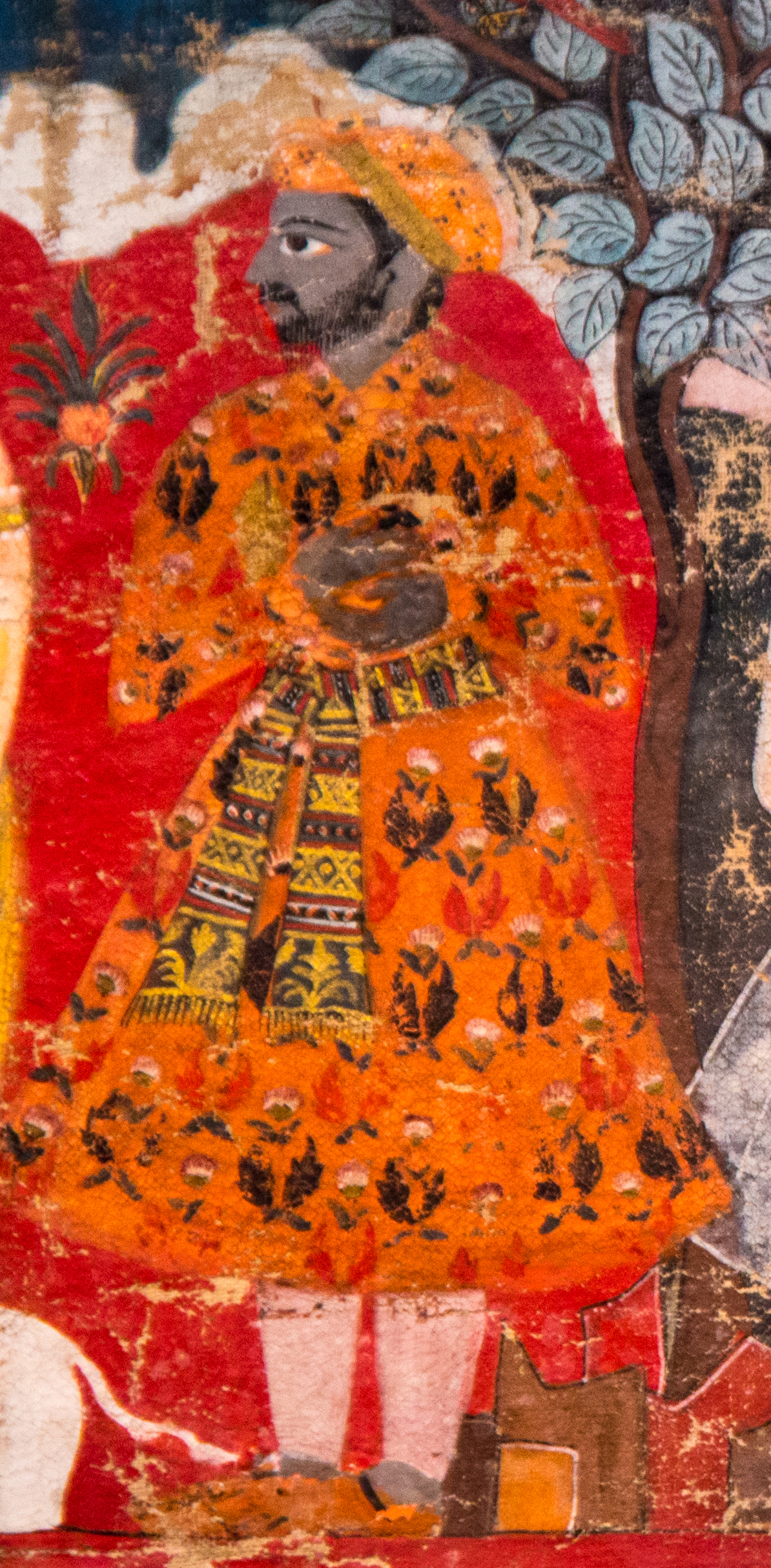
- Contemporary portrait currently at the Patan Museum

King of Lalitpur
- Reign: 1619–1661
- Predecessor: Shivasimha Malla
- Successor: Srinivasa Malla
- Born: 27 July 1606; Lalitpur, Kingdom of Kantipur, Nepal (Present day Bagmati Province, Nepal)
- Died: 1661 (aged 54–55); Varanasi, Mughal Empire (Present day Uttar Pradesh, India)
- Spouse: Bhanumati
- Issue: Srinivasa Malla
- Dynasty: Malla
- Father: Harihara Simha

Siddhi Narasimha Malla (Newar: 𑐳𑐶𑐡𑑂𑐢𑐶 𑐣𑐬𑐳𑐶𑑄𑐴 𑐩𑐮𑑂𑐮), also known as Siddhinarasimha or Siddhi Narasingh or Siddhi Nar Singh, was a Malla dynasty king and the King of Lalitpur. He was a religious king and ruled from 1619 to 1661.

== Background of Patan ==
After the division of Kathmandu Valley into the three kingdoms of Kantipur, Patan, and Bhadgaon, Patan was ruled by feudal lords called pramanas. In around 1697, Shivasimha Malla, grandfather of Siddhinarasimha and Laxmi Narasimha Malla, annexed Patan, which was then ruled by Purandarsimha, the son of Vishnusimha.

Sivasimha Malla installed his son Hariharsimha as the governor of Patan. Hariharsimha died shortly afterwards, and he was succeeded by his eldest son, Siddhinarasimha who was born on NS 726 Āṣāḍha kṛṣṇa aṣṭamī, translating to 27 July 1606 CE. In 1619, when Shivasimha Malla died Siddhinarasimha declared Patan independent from Kantipur.

== Reign ==
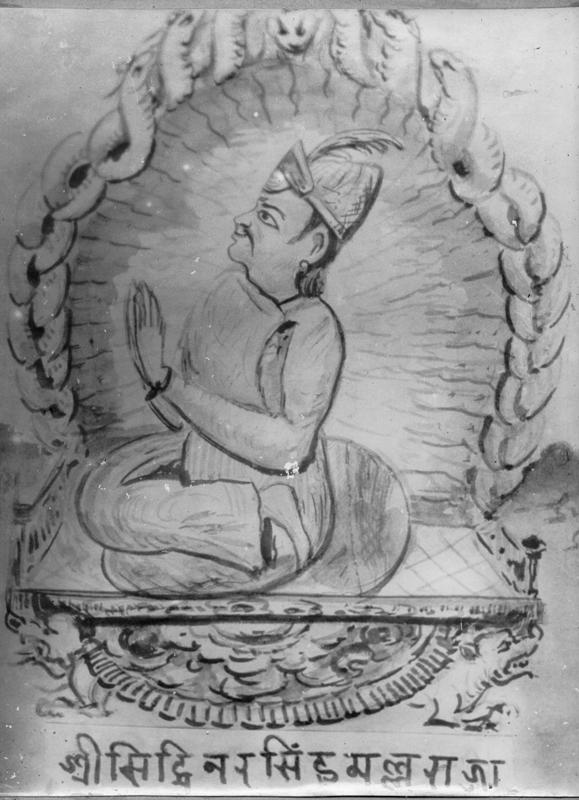
Portrait of Siddhi Narasimha Malla at the walls of the Jana Bahal Temple, Kathmandu.

Siddhinarasima Malla's reign is generally considered one of the finest among the kings of Patan. Patan was on excellent terms with many neighboring kingdoms such as the Gorkha Kingdom which was then ruled by Ram Shah. The two kingdoms had an agreement to have a joint successor if any one of them died without a male heir. He also maintained friendly relations with the kingdoms in Terai as his wife Bhanumati was from the region of Terai. He had maintained an agreement with Kantipur such that the merchants from Patan could trade in Lhasa and had a similar arrangement with Gorkha.

Relations with Kantipur started to deteriorate after Pratap Malla became its king. Pratap Malla, unlike his father, did not like the idea of Patan being independent from Kantipur and laid several attacks against Patan.

Siddhinarasimha educated his son Srinivasa Malla from an early age about ruling a kingdom. This may partly be because of Siddhinarasimha's desires to retire gradually from being a monarch and devote himself to religious activities. Srinivasa jointly handled administrative responsibilities with his father in 1641.

== Religious works ==
Siddhinarasimha was an extremely religious king and lived a disciplined life. He was a Hindu but had a liberal outlook on all religions. He also built several temples such as the Krishna Mandir in 1636. He ritually performed Koti Hom (sacrificial ceremony), and wrote devotional songs in Newar and Maithili. He also renovated many temples built by the early Malla kings.

He made it customary for the people returning from Lhasa to undergo a purification process. In 1652, he went on a two-year pilgrimage to India.

== Literary works ==
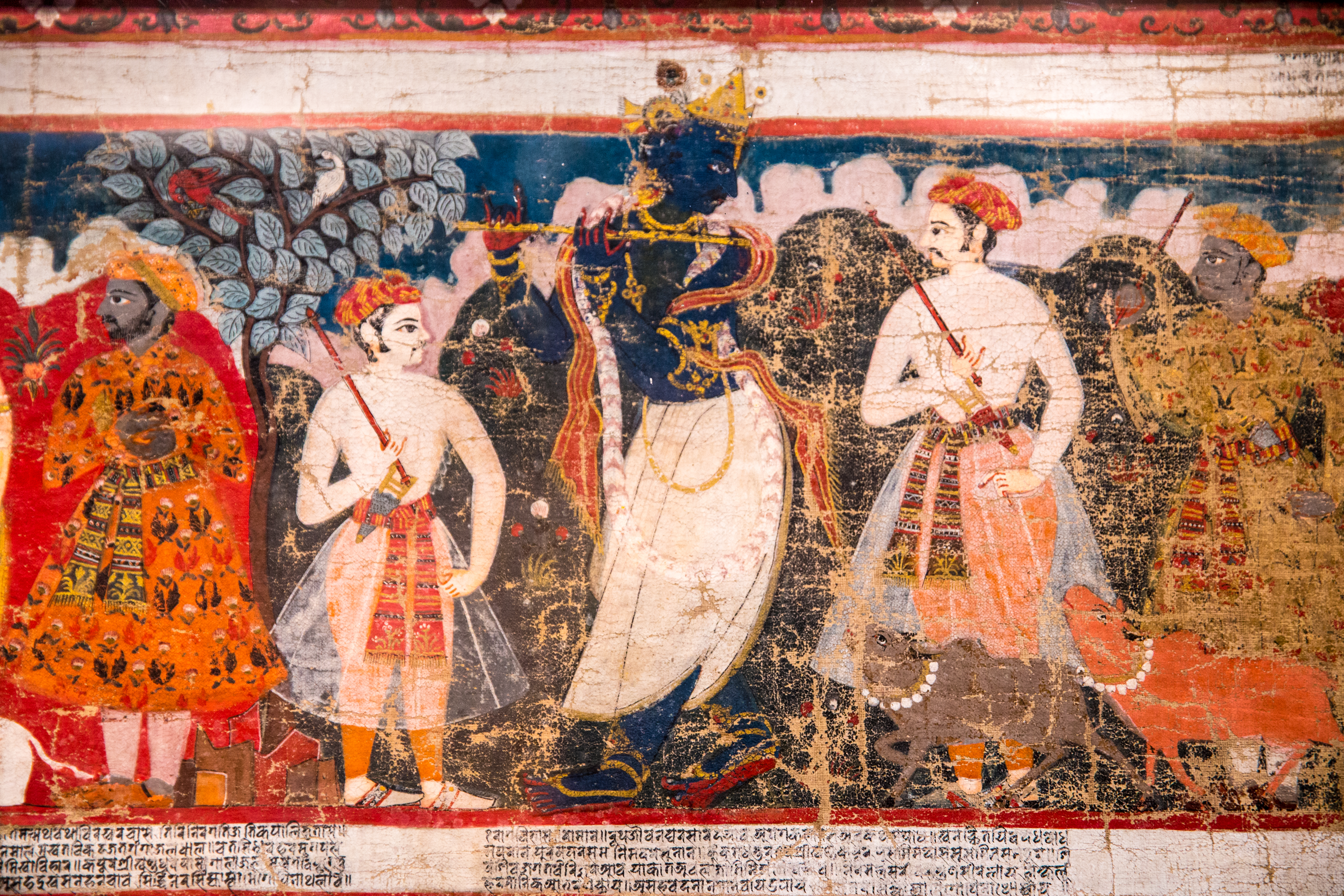
Illustration from Gopinathya Gita, a tulanpati (a type of paubha painting) with the poem written beneath.

Siddhi Narasimha Malla is known as first playwriter in Newar language. The Ekadashivrata Pyakhan, written in 1633 CE, is first drama composed in Newar language by him. He also composed Kartika Pyakhana in Newar language which is still performed every year in Patan since its inception in 1641 CE.

Similarly, Gopinathya Gita, a 31-poem composed by Siddhi Narasimha Malla in Newar, is considered an important work in Newar literature, some of which are still sang in Kartik Nach.

== Death ==
In 1657, he abdicated as the King and went on a religious exile. He lived on the banks of Ganges and in his last years went to Vanarasi where died in 1661.

Preceded by Shivasimha Malla	King of Patan; 1619–1661	Succeeded by Srinivasa Malla
