= Nripendra Malla =

17th-century King of Kantipur

King of Kantipur
- Reign: 1674–1680
- Coronation: 29 June 1674
- Predecessor: Pratap Malla
- Successor: Parthibendra Malla
- Born: November 1661
- Died: 11 June 1680 (aged 18)
- Spouse: Jaya Lakshmi
- Dynasty: Malla
- Father: Pratap Malla

Nripendra Malla (Newar: 𑐣𑐺𑐥𑐾𑐣𑑂𑐡𑑂𑐬 𑐩𑐮𑑂𑐮) was a Malla ruler and the ninth king of Kantipur. He ascended the throne on 29 June 1674 following the death of his father, Pratap Malla. He died at the age of 18 years and 7 months on 11 June 1680.

== Reign ==
Pratap Malla intended for his youngest son, Mahipendra Malla, to succeed him as king. However, due to concerns from neighboring kingdoms regarding the succession, Mahipendra Malla had to yield to his elder brothers, Nripendra Malla and Parthibendra Malla. The Kingdom of Patan played a significant role in supporting Nripendra's ascension to the throne of Kantipur.

Nripendra's reign was relatively insignificant, with the actual governance of the kingdom being exercised by his brother, Parthibendra Malla. In fact, the Vamshavalis (genealogies) do not mention Nripendra Malla as a king. However, coins minted in his name and documents addressing him with royal titles confirm that he ascended the throne immediately following his father's death.

His queen was named Jaya Lakshmi.

Nripendra Malla died in 1680 and was succeeded by his brother, Parthibendra Malla.

== Literary works ==
Nripendra Malla is also known to have composed a hymn entitled Devi mātā nāma candi and a poem called Phasa the begana oṅa in the Newar language.

Preceded by Pratap Malla	King of Kantipur; 1674–1680	Succeeded by Parthibendra Malla
