= Parthibendra Malla =

17th-century King of Kantipur

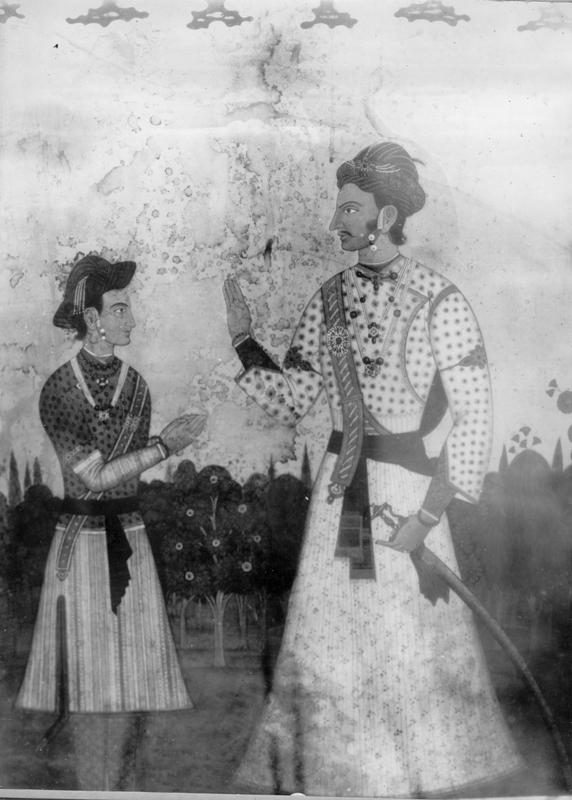
- Portrait at the Jana bahal

King of Kantipur
- Reign: 25 June 1680 – 2 July 1687
- Predecessor: Nripendra Malla
- Successor: Bhupalendra Malla
- Died: 2 July 1687
- Spouse: Riddhi Lakshmi
- Issue: Bhupalendra Malla
- Dynasty: Malla
- Father: Pratap Malla
- Mother: Indumati

Parthibendra Malla (Newar: 𑐥𑐵𑐬𑑂𑐠𑐶𑐰𑐾𑐣𑑂𑐡𑑂𑐬 𑐩𑐮𑑂𑐮) was a Malla ruler and the tenth king of Kantipur. He succeeded his brother Nripendra Malla who died in 1680, on 25 June 1680 .

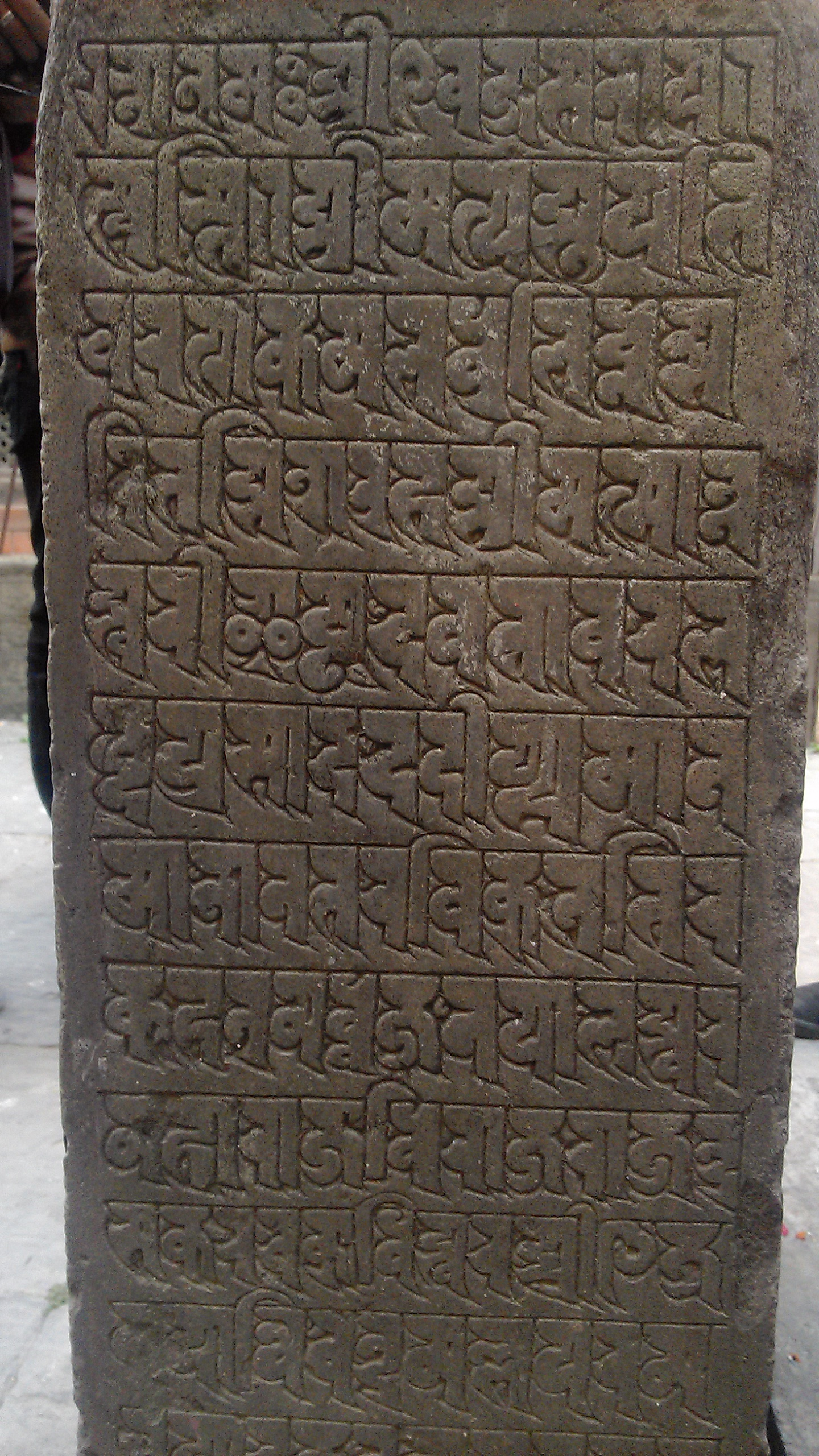
Parthibendra Malla’s stone inscription in the Ranjana script.

== Reign ==
Parthibendra had earlier colluded with his brother Nripendra Malla to install the latter as the king instead of Mahipatendra Malla, their brother and the actual heir. Even during the reign of Nripendra Malla, Parthibendra was the one controlling the city and after Nripendra's death in 1680, Parthibendra Malla succeeded him as the king of Kantipur.

Pathibendra was poisoned to death in 1687 and as many as twenty-four women went Sati. His wife, Riddhilakshmi, however, did not went Sati. He was succeeded by his son Bhupalendra Malla.

== Literary works ==
Parthivendra Malla is known to have composed seven poems in the Newar language, of which five have been published.

Preceded by Nripendra Malla	King of Kantipur; 1680–1687	Succeeded by Bhupalendra Malla
