= Pratap Malla =

17th-century king of Kantipur

- Kavindra, Nepāleśvara
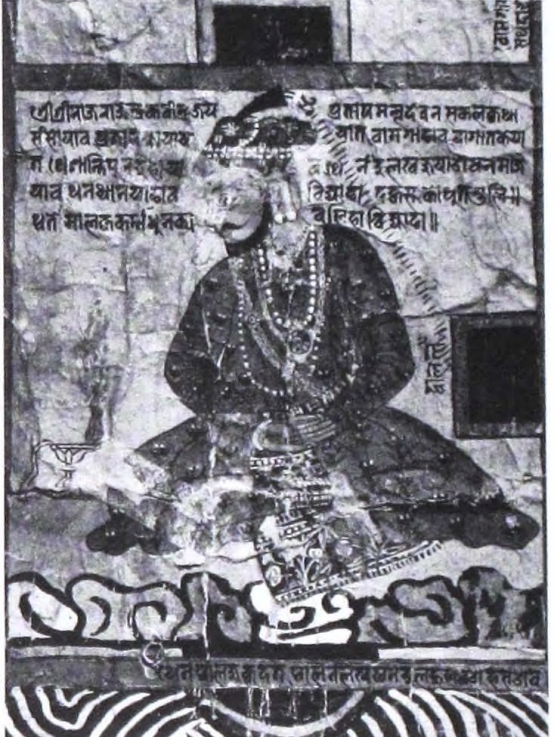
- King Pratap Malla at prayer, watercolors on multi-layered paper, 17th century

King of Kantipur
- Reign: 1641 – 16 April 1674
- Predecessor: Lakshmi Narasimha Malla
- Successor: Nripendra Malla
- Born: 6 June 1623; Kingdom of Kantipur, Nepal Mandala (Present day Bagmati Province, Nepal)
- Died: 16 April 1674 (aged 50); Kathmandu, Kingdom of Kantipur, Nepal Mandala
- Spouse: Rajamati; Rupamati; Lalmati; Laldevi; Anantapriya; Racchamani; Prabhavati; Indravati
- Issue: Nripendra Malla; Parthibendra Malla; Bhupendra Malla; Mahipatendra Malla; Chakravartendra Malla
Regnal name
- Newar: 𑐱𑑂𑐬𑐷 𑐱𑑂𑐬𑐷 𑐬𑐵𑐖 𑐬𑐵𑐖𑐾𑐣𑑂𑐡𑑂𑐬 𑐎𑐰𑐷𑐣𑑂𑐡𑑂𑐬 𑐖𑐫 𑐥𑑂𑐬𑐟𑐵𑐥 𑐩𑐮𑑂𑐮 𑐡𑐾𑐰; Sri Sri Raj Rajendra Kavindra Jaya Pratap Malla Deva
- Dynasty: Malla
- Father: Lakshmi Narasimha Malla
- Religion: Hinduism

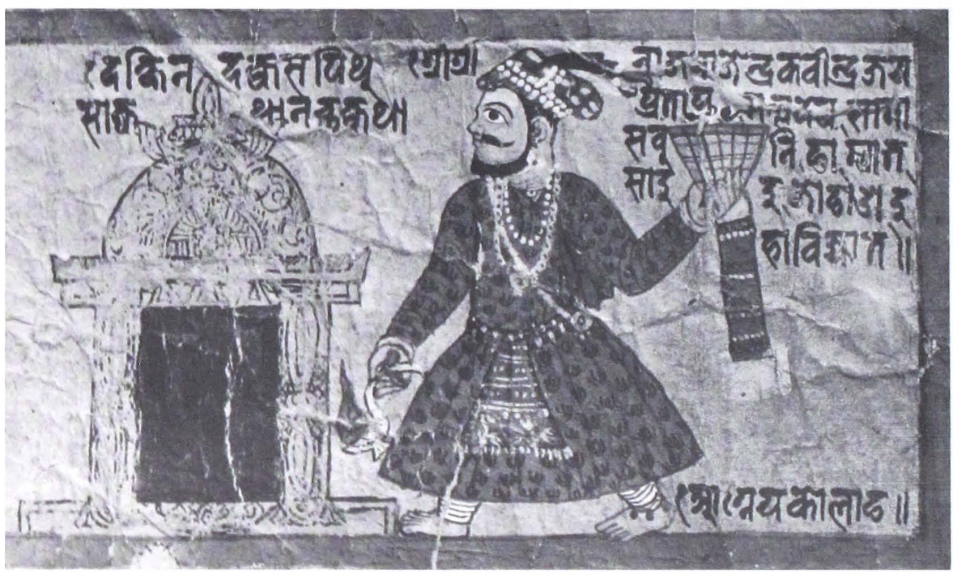
Lamp in hand, Pratap Malla bravely enters Santipura to seek the tantra, detail, watercolors on multi-layered paper, Kathmandu, 17th century.

Pratap Malla (Newar: 𑐥𑑂𑐬𑐟𑐵𑐥 𑐩𑐮𑑂𑐮; 1623–1674) was the eighth King of Kantipur from 1641 until his death in 16 April 1674. He was a poet of the Newar language and composed 138 poems in Newar throughout his life. He attempted to unify Kathmandu Valley by conquering Lalitpur and Bhaktapur, but failed in the effort. He was successful in extending and securing the borders of Kantipur and was responsible for the monopoly over trade with Tibet. The resulting prosperity led to the construction of the majority of the buildings around Durbar Square during his reign. His reign is seen as a cultural and economic high point of the Malla dynasty.

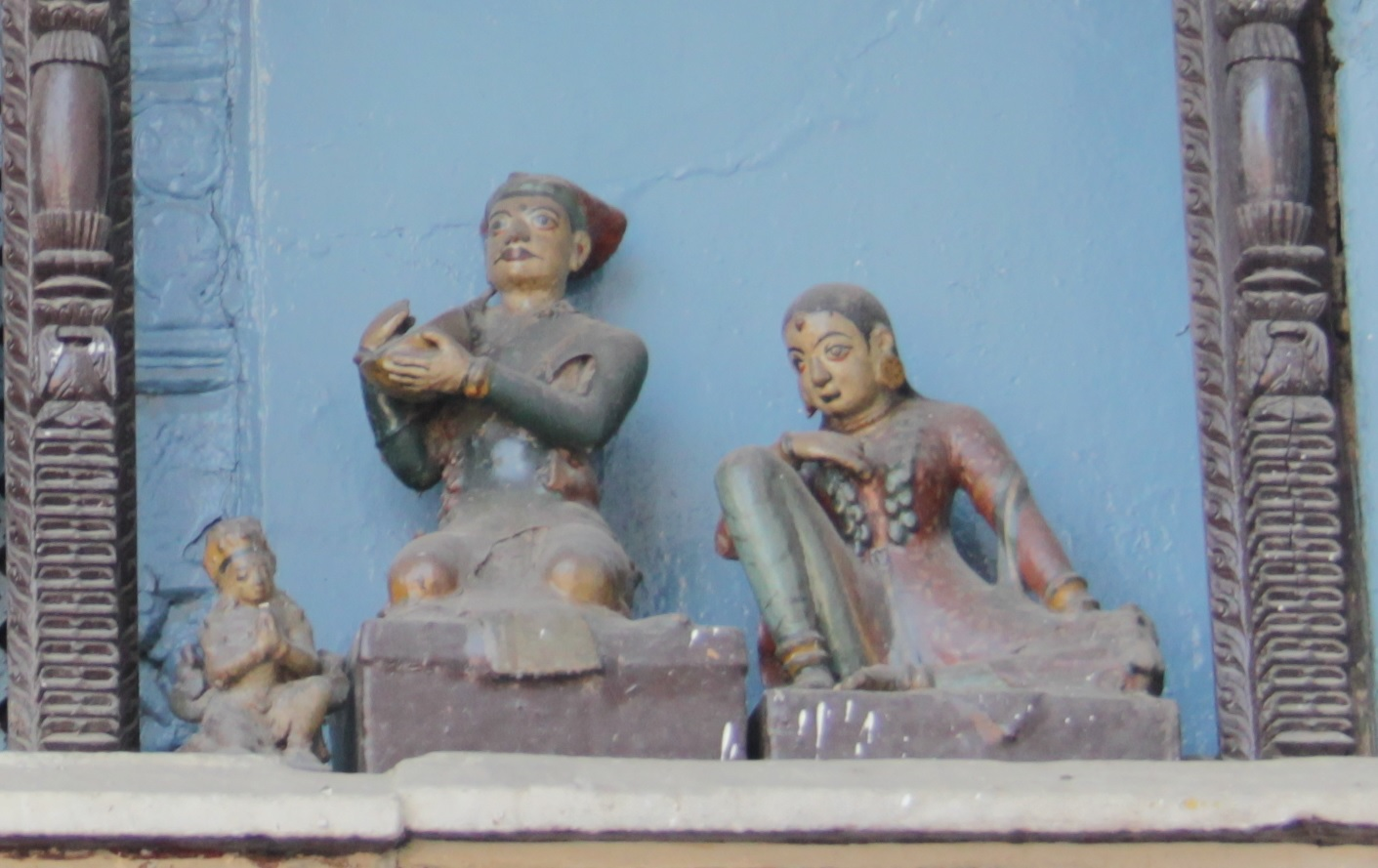
Pratap Malla, playing a lute, and his queen, seen in the niche above the Hanuman Dhoka Palace gate.

A statue of Pratap Malla is found standing on a column facing the palace in the square. His image can also be seen in the niche above the Hanuman Dhoka Palace gate. The niche above the gate is Krishna in his ferocious tantric aspect, flanked by more gentle, amorous Krishna surrounded by gopinis, and by King Pratap Malla playing a lute, and his queen.

== Early life ==
Pratap Malla was born on jyeṣṭha śukla aṣṭamī in Nepal Sambat 743, equivalent to 6 June 1623 CE. He was the second son of Lakshmi Narasimha Malla.

=== Marriage and children ===
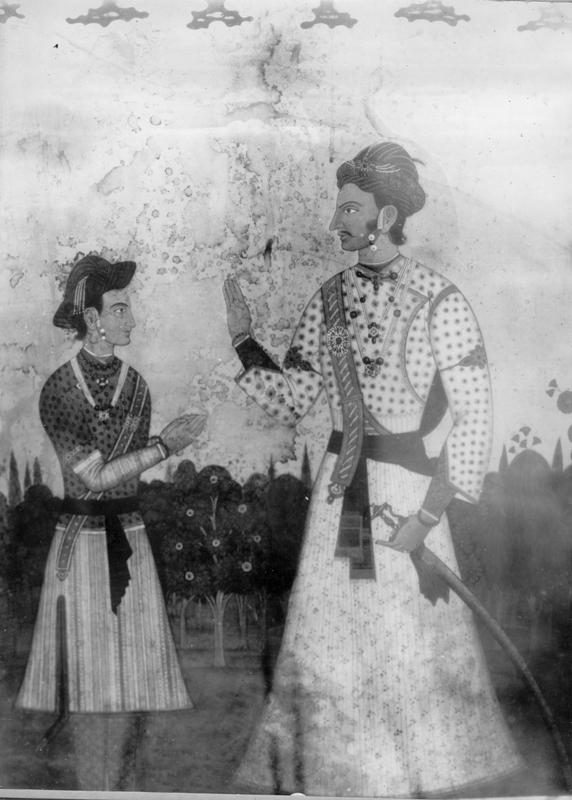
Pratap Malla with his son Parthibendra Malla.

Pratap Malla had eight queens: Rajamati, Rupamati, Lalmati, Laldevi, Anantapriya, Racchamani, Prabhavati, and Indravati.

Pratap Malla had five sons: Bhupendra, Chakravartendra, Nripendra, Mahipatendra, and Parthibendra. He wanted his sons to have experience in the administration of the country even during his own lifetime. With this aim in view, he made them rule over the country for one year in turn. But unfortunately, his second son Chakrabartendra Malla died the day after he took over the administration of the country.

== Reign ==
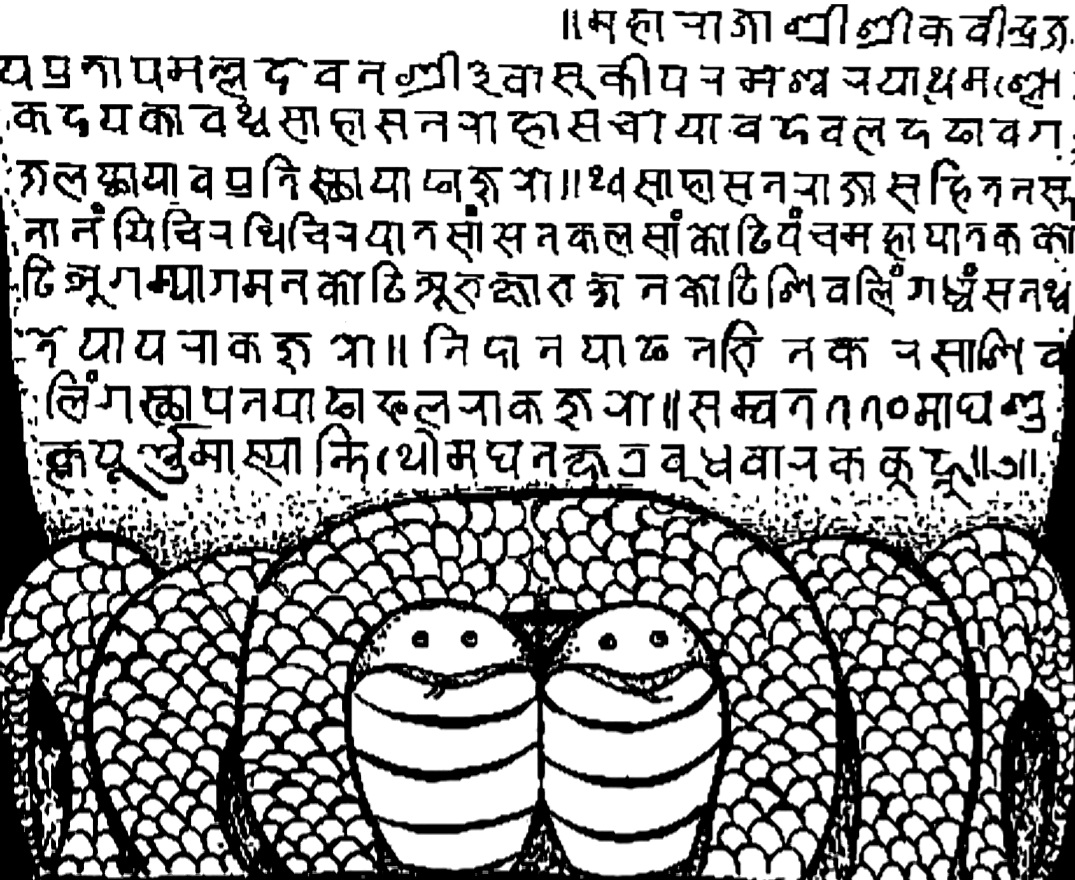
Basuki Temple inscription of Pratap Malla in the Newar language, 1650 CE.

When Pratap Malla’s father was alive, Pratap Malla had the experience of administration. He imprisoned his father on the grounds of insanity and sat on the throne in 1641 CE. He was a very ambitious king.

=== Relation with Lalitpur and Bhaktapur ===
Pratap Malla often fought with Lalitpur and Bhaktapur to annex them to his kingdom but could not succeed. He tried to play the kings of Lalitpur and Bhaktapur against each other. Sometimes he sided with Bhaktapur and posed a menace to Lalitpur. Sometimes he sided with Lalitpur and fell upon Bhaktapur. His main aim was to annex Lalitpur to Kathmandu. But his aim was not fulfilled as the king of Lalitpur had the king of Gorkha, Ram Shah, as his ally. Moreover, Srinivasa Malla, son of Siddhi Narasimha was no less inferior to Pratap Malla in courage and diplomacy. In 1634 A.D., when Siddhi Narasimha Malla was engaged in performing Koṭi Homa, Pratap Malla availing himself of the opportunity, made a surprise attack on Patan and conquered some of the places important from the strategic point of view. Dambar Shah, son of Ram Shah had come with a contingent to help Siddhi Narasimha Malla, but his troops were waylaid and put to rout. Pratap Malla gave a lot of trouble to Naresha Malla, King of Bhaktapur. He made Naresha Malla pay tribute to him in the form of elephants. Later, again he sided with Srinivasa Malla and laid a siege on Bhaktapur. He plundered Bhaktapur and carried away many valuables. But when Lalitpur sided with Bhaktapur, Pratap Malla signed a treaty with Bhaktapur.

=== Relations with Tibet ===
The 16th and 17th centuries were a crucial period in the relations between Nepal and Tibet. By 1600, Tibet was in a state of near chaos as a result of the struggle between competing Buddhist sects and the more basic regional conflict between the two central Tibetan provinces, of which Lhasa and Shigatse are the political centers. The powerful figure of the Fifth Dalai Lama, the head of the Gelugpa (yellow) sect of Tibetan Buddhism, gradually gained control, both spiritual and temporal, over Tibet in the first half of the 17th century, with the valuable assistance of the Khoshote Mongols.

During this critical period, two ambitious kings, Ram Shah of Gorkha (1606–1636) and Pratap Malla of Kantipur, took advantage of Tibetan weakness to seize control of the vital border-pass areas through which most of the trans-Himalayan trade passed. Ram Shah's incursions into Tibet occurred toward the end of his reign, probably from 1625 to 1630, after he had conquered the intervening territory between Gorkha and Kirong district in Tibet. The first Gorkhali invading force was defeated, and the severed heads of the two commanders were sent to the Panchen Lama at Shigatse. Ram Shah led another army into Kirong area, defeated the Tibetans at Khinchog and advanced as far as Kukurghat. He reached an agreement with the Tibetans under which the boundary line between Gorkha and Tibet was drawn at Kukurghat, thus giving Ram Shah control over one of the main channels of communication between Nepal and Tibet.

This posed a serious problem for Kathmandu merchant community, which normally used the route through Kirong in their trade with Tibet. Pratap malla decided against contending directly with the Gorkha ruler for control of Kerong, but sought instead to bring the second major trade route, via Kuti, under his authority. An army commanded by his brother, Bhim Malla, was sent to Kuti in the 1630s and again in the period between 1645 and 1650. On the second occasion, Bhim Malla overran the border district and advanced some distance toward Shigatse before he was met by the deputies of the Dalai Lama, with whom he negotiated a peace settlement. The terms of this treaty were, in summary:

1. Kathmandu was granted joint authority with Tibet over the border towns of Kuti and Kirong.
2. The merchant community of Kathmandu valley was permitted to establish 32 trading houses at Lhasa.
3. The Kathmandu court was given the right to post a representative (Nayo) at Lhasa.
4. Tibet agreed not to impose any charges or customs duties on Newari merchants who were engaged in trade with Tibet.
5. Tibet promised to make a token payment in gold and silver annually to Kathmandu.
6. It was agreed that Nepal would mint coins for Tibet; Tibet would use these coins internally and would either provide the silver required for their minting or would pay for Nepalese coins with gold.
7. Tibet agreed that all trade with India, even though conducted by other than Newari merchants, would be channeled through Kathmandu valley in preference to the routes to the east (i.e., via Sikkim, Bhutan or Towang).

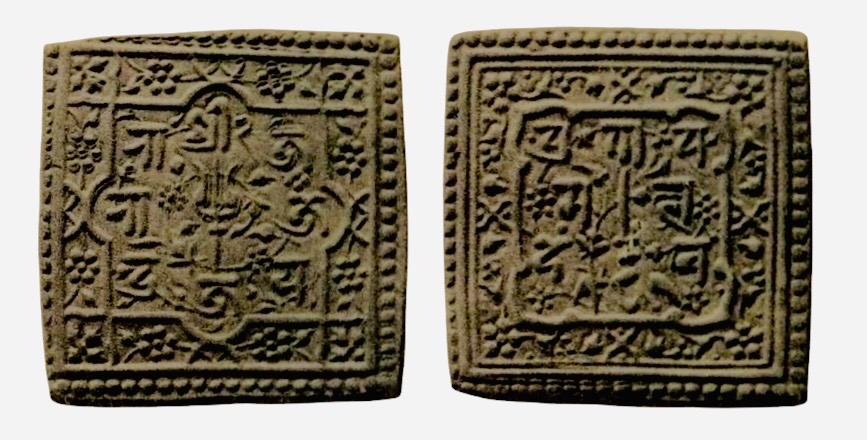
Coin of Pratap Malla, with coin legend in the Newar script, 1661 CE (N.S. 781).

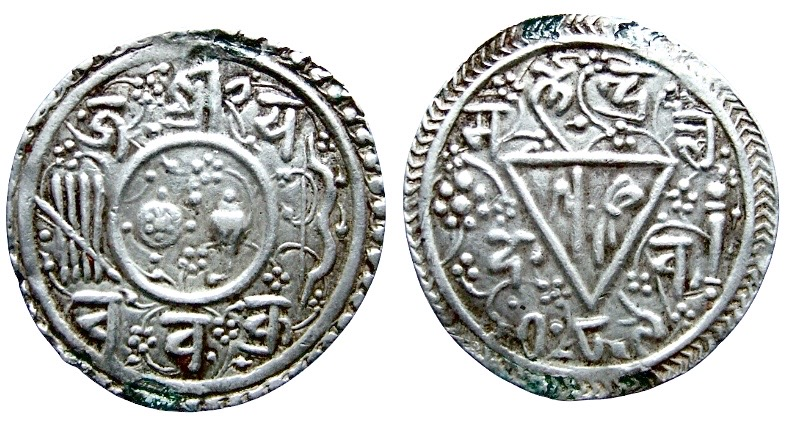
Coin issued in the name of Chakravartendra Malla by Pratap Malla, 1669 CE (N.S. 789).

The king of Kantipur also profited substantially from the process under which he minted coins for the Tibetan government, for he deducted a certain percentage of the silver provided by Lhasa as his fee for this service. These Nepalese coins, were the sole currency in circulation throughout Tibet for more than a century.

=== European visitors ===
In the year 1661, Pratap Malla, the then King of Kathmandu received Albert d’Orville and Johann Grueber – a Belgian and an Austrian with open arms into the valley. They were visiting Kathmandu from the imperial Chinese Observatory in Peking via Lhasa, seeking a land route to India. He granted them permission to preach the new religion, but without waiting for permission for a permanent stay, they left for Agra, the headquarters of the Tibet-Hindustan Mission in India. They had determined the latitude of Kathmandu to be 27"5', which is low by 37', the actual latitude being 27"42'.

== Literary works ==
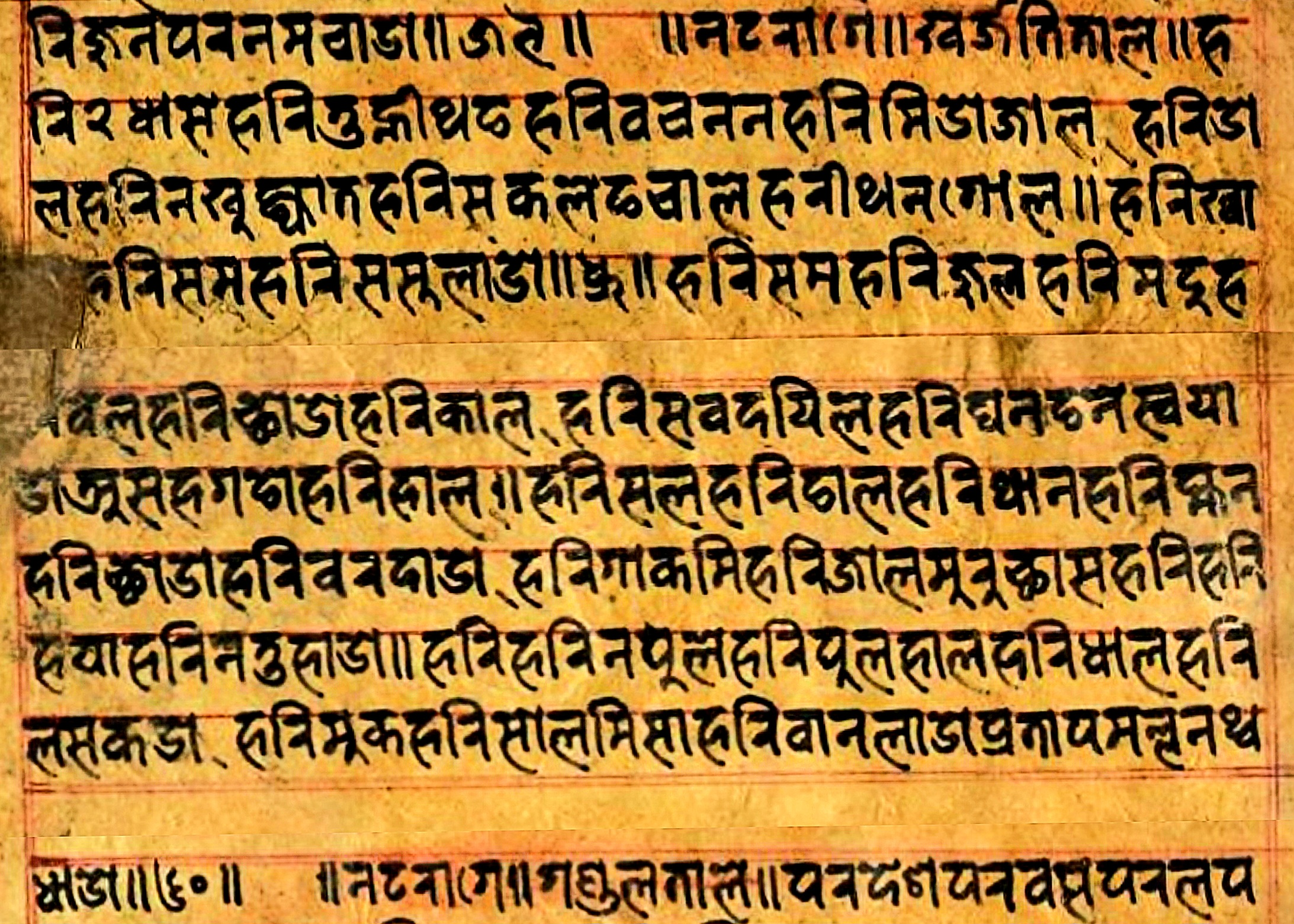
Manuscript of a poem by Pratap Malla in the Newar language.

Pratap Malla was a lover of literature and he himself was a poet. He gave himself the title of "Kavindra", meaning "the King of poets". Pratap malla was a great contributor of Sanskrit hymns and Newar poems. He composed 138 poems in the Newar language; however, 98 poems have been lost and only 40 poems have been found. Similarly, he composed 15 Sanskrit hymns, which have been found in his inscriptions at various temples.

== Death ==
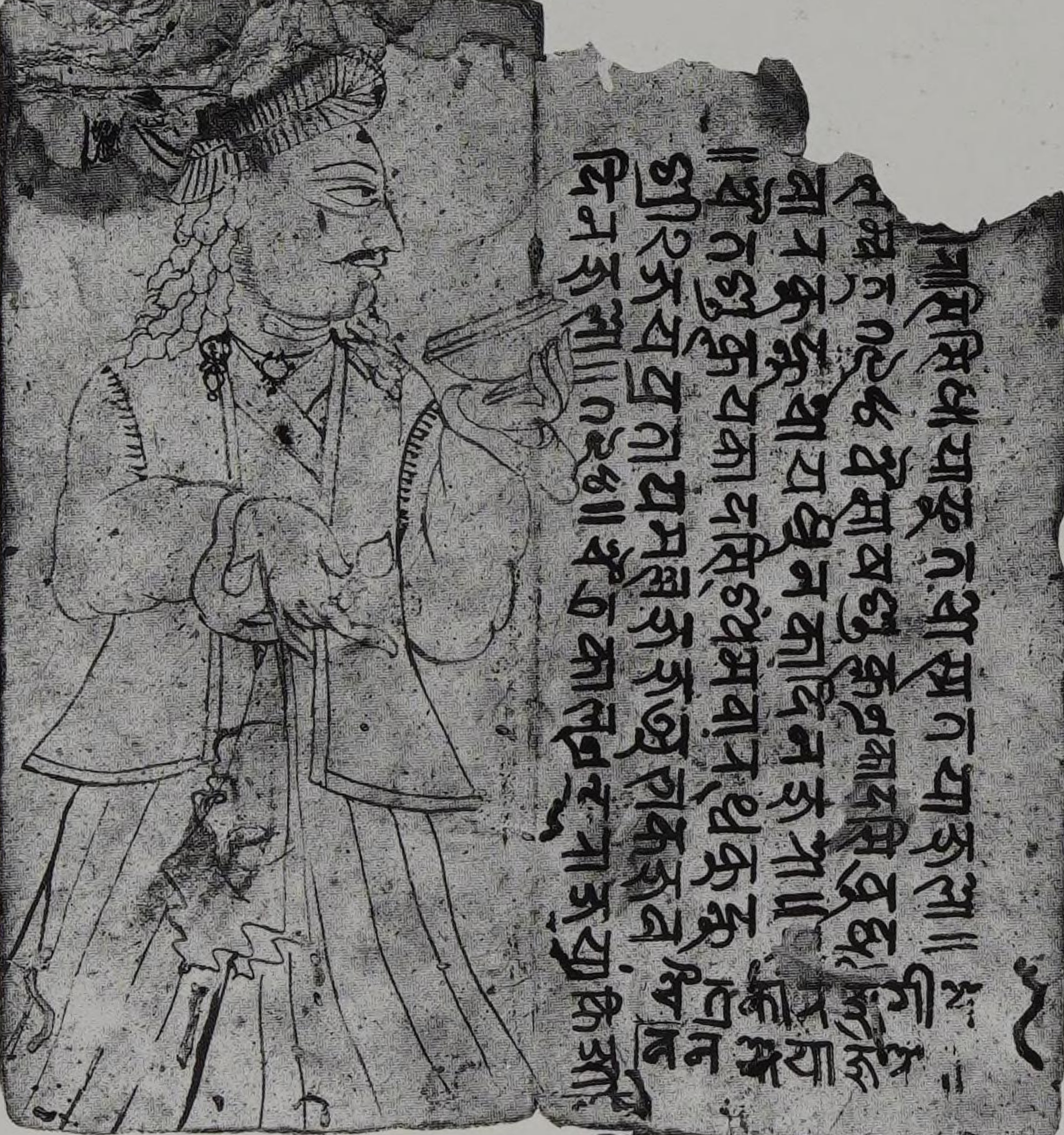
Sketch of Pratap Malla (left), with a Newari colophon recording his date of death (right).

Pratap Malla died a sudden death. While he was watching the religious dance of Harisiddhi, he fell down unconscious and died. After ruling for 33 years, he died in 1674. During his reign for thirty-three years (1641 A.D. to 1674 A.D.) there was peace and prosperity at home and no danger from outside. Trade with India and China made Nepal prosperous. Art and literature flourished. Kings of Bhaktapur, Lalitpur and other neighbouring kingdoms did not dare to invade Kantipur. Just as Muslim culture reached its height in the time of Shah Jahan, so did Nepalese culture reached its height in the time of Pratap Malla.

== Legacy ==
Pratap Malla was fond of building temples. He set up a statue of Hanuman in front door of the palace, which is known as "Hanuman Dhoka". Besides this, he rebuilt the Bajrayogini Temple and the Guhyeshwari Temple. He offered a gold umbrella to Pashupatinath temple. He had great respect for Buddhism. He also introduced Jana Baha Dyah Jatra.

=== Pratap Malla's Column ===
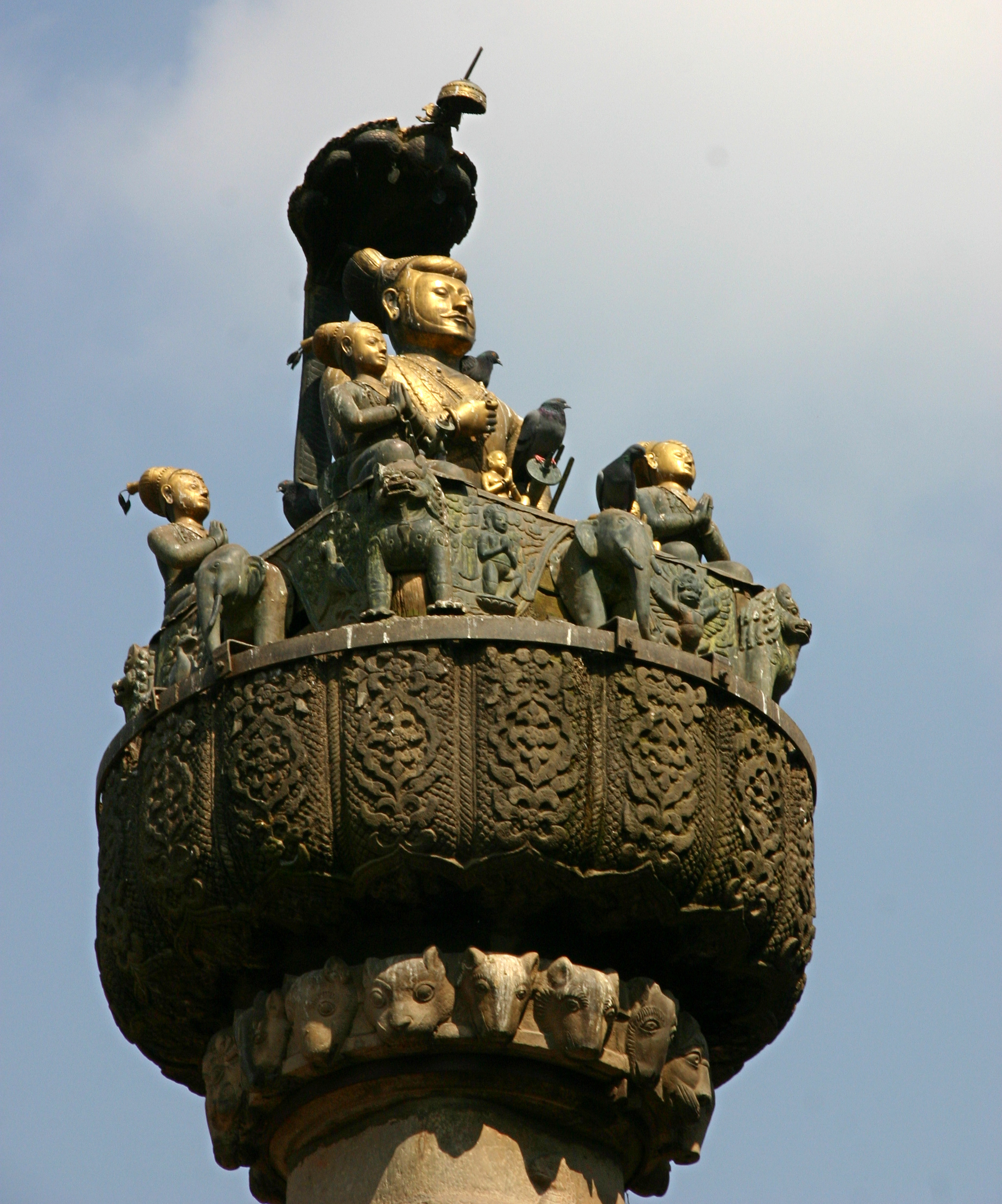
Statue of Pratap Malla with his wives and sons.

Across from the Chyasin Dega Temple, standing on a slightly raised platform in front of the Hanuman Dhoka is the square stone pillar, known as the Pratap Dhvaja. It is topped by a statue of King Pratap Malla, seated with folded hands and surrounded by his two wives and his five (including an infant) sons. He looks towards his private prayer room on the third floor of the Degutaleju Temple. The column was erected in 1670 by Pratap Malla and preceded the similar columns in Patan and Bhaktapur.

=== Chyasin Dega Temple ===
The octagonal Krishna Temple known as Chyasin Dega Temple was built in 1648–1649 by Pratap Malla, either as a response to rival Siddhi Narasimha Malla's Krishna Temple in Patan or as a religious consolation for his earlier failure to conquer that city, or in memory of his two wives, or a combination of all three. The three-tiered traditional Newari building is supported by stone columns around the circumference of the base. The statue of Krishna inside the temple is accompanied by his two wives, Satyabhama and Rukmini, all of which, according to the inscription, bear deliberate resemblance to Pratap Malla and his own two queens.

=== Kal Bhairav Statue ===
North of the Jagannath Temple is the figure of Kal Bhairav. Bhairav is Shiva in his most fearsome aspect, and this huge stone image of the terrifying Kal Bhairav has six arms, wears a garland of skulls and tramples on a corpse, which is symbolic of human ignorance. The figure is said to have been brought to its present location by Pratap Malla, having been found in a field to the north of the city. The image was originally cut from a single stone but the upper left-hand corner has since been repaired. It is said that telling a lie while standing before Kal Bhairav will bring instant death and it was once used as a form of trial by ordeal.

=== Multilingual inscription ===
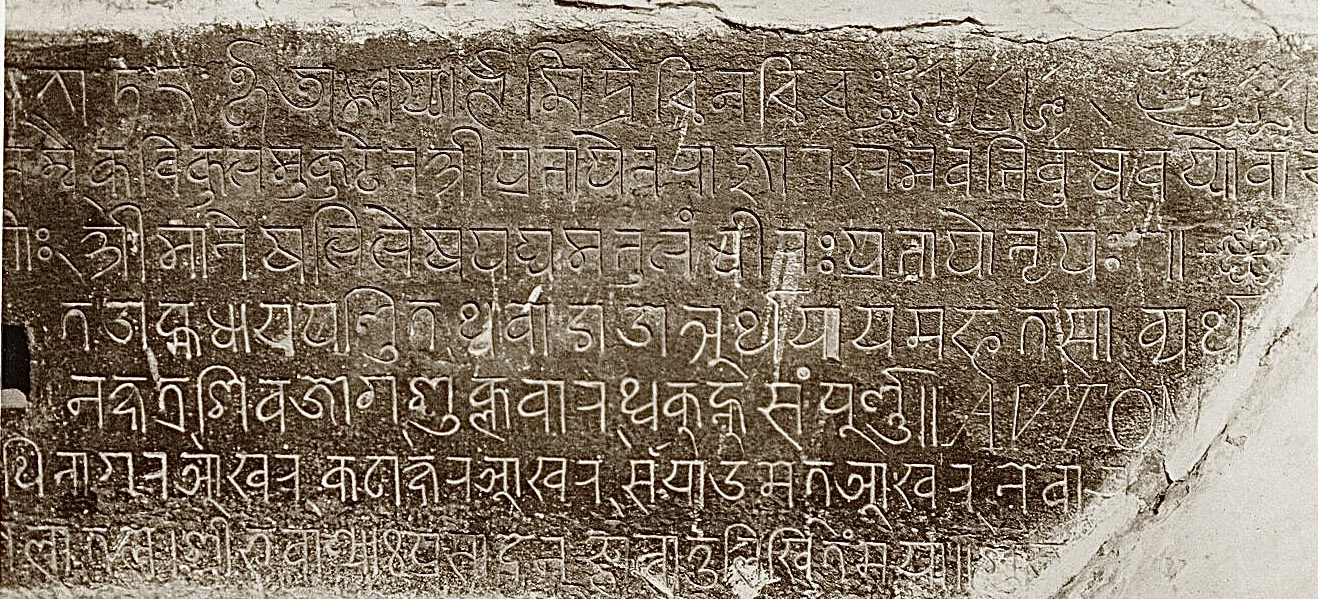
Right side of Pratap Malla's multilingual inscription. The phrase ...𑐱𑐸𑐎𑑂𑐮𑐧𑐵𑐬 𑐠𑑂𑐰 𑐎𑐸𑐴𑑂𑐣𑐸 𑐳𑑄𑐥𑐸𑐬𑑂𑐞𑑌 AVTOM is written in the last line of the fifth row.

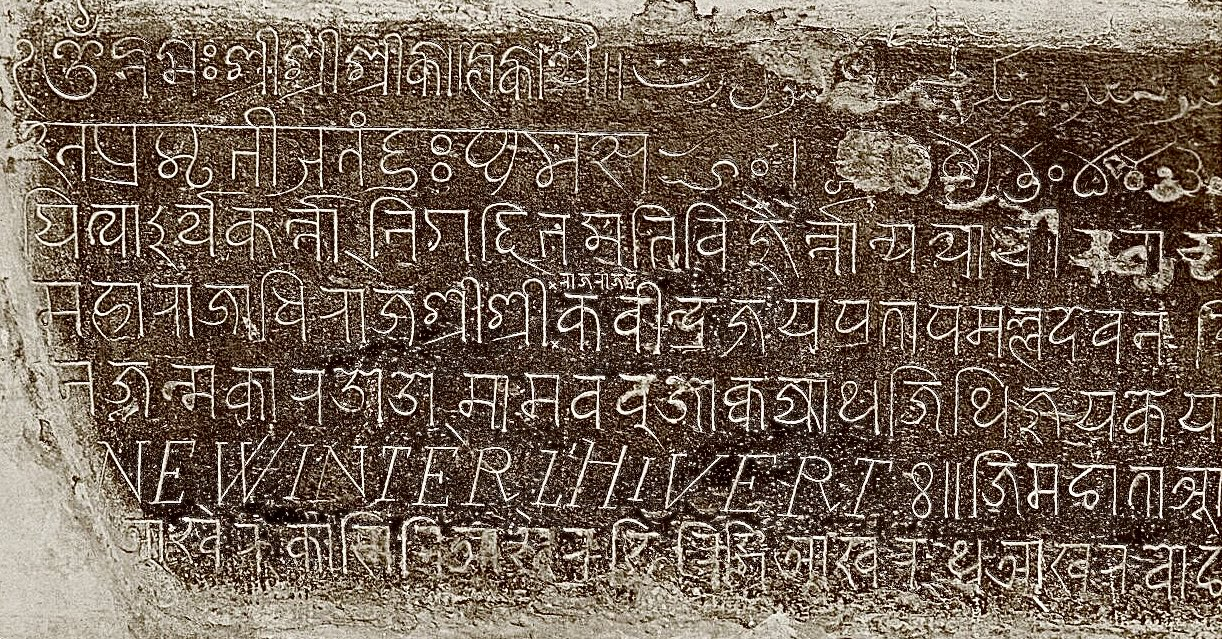
Left side of Pratap Malla's multilingual inscription. The phrase NE WINTER LHIVERT𑑌𑐖𑐶𑐩𑐒𑐵𑐟𑐵... is in the first line of the sixth row.

On the outside of the white wall of Kathmandu Durbar, opposite the Vishnu Temple, is a long low stone inscription about the goddess Kalika written in different languages, including European languages. Pratap Malla, renowned for his linguistic abilities, set up this inscription on 14 January 1654. A legend tells that milk will flow from the spout in the middle if somebody is able to decipher all fifteen scripts. The multilingual inscription he erected in Kathmandu Durbar Square contains the following text:

jimaṅātā ākhalana śloka dayakāo thama cosyaṃ tayā.

golamola ākhara, pārsi ākhara, tirahuti ākhara, raṃja ākhara, mājhepāta ākhara, devanāgara ākhara, sam̐yā ujena ākhara, gotriyā ākhara, ārvī ākhara, kayathināgara ākhara, kaṭākṣara ākhara, sam̐yā umeta ākhara, nevāra ākhara, kāsmirī ākhara, phiriṅgī ākhara. thva ākhara boṅāo ślokayā artha yāya phavamha manukhya janmasa śreṣṭha dhāya, thva ākhara boṅāva ślokayā artha yāya maphatasā odā dhāya paśujanma.

Translation:

I have composed verses in fifteen scripts.

(These are) Golmol script (Bhujimol), Persian script, Tirhuta script, Ranjana script, Majhepat script, Devanagari script, Tibet's Uchen script, Gotria script (Bengali), Arabic script, Kaithi script, Kaṭākṣara script (Telugu), Tibet's Ume script, Newar script, Kashmiri script, and Phiringi script (Roman). If any one reading these scripts could understand the meaning of the shlokas, he is really great in his birth as a human being. But he who cannot know the meaning is a beast.

The account of the wall and the inscription is given by Fr. Giuseppe, writing at the end of eighteenth century:

In a wall of the royal palace of Kathmandu, which is built upon the court before the palace, there is a great stone of a single piece, which is about fifteen feet long, and four or five feet thick: on the top of this great stone there are four square holes at equal distances from each other. In the inside of the wall they pour water into the holes, and in the courtside, each hole having a closed canal, every person may draw water to drink. At the foot of the stone is a large ladder, by which people ascend to drink; but the curiosity of the stone consists in its being quite covered with characters of different languages cut upon it. Some lines contain the characters of the language of the country; others the characters of Tibet, others Persia, others Greece, besides several others of different nations; and in the middle there is a line of Roman characters, which appears in this form AVTOMNE WINTER LHIVERT; but none of the inhabitants have any knowledge how they came there, nor do they know whether or not any European had ever been in Nepal before the missionaries, who arrived there only the beginning of the present century. They are manifestly two French names of seasons, with an English word between them.

=== Swayambhunath ===
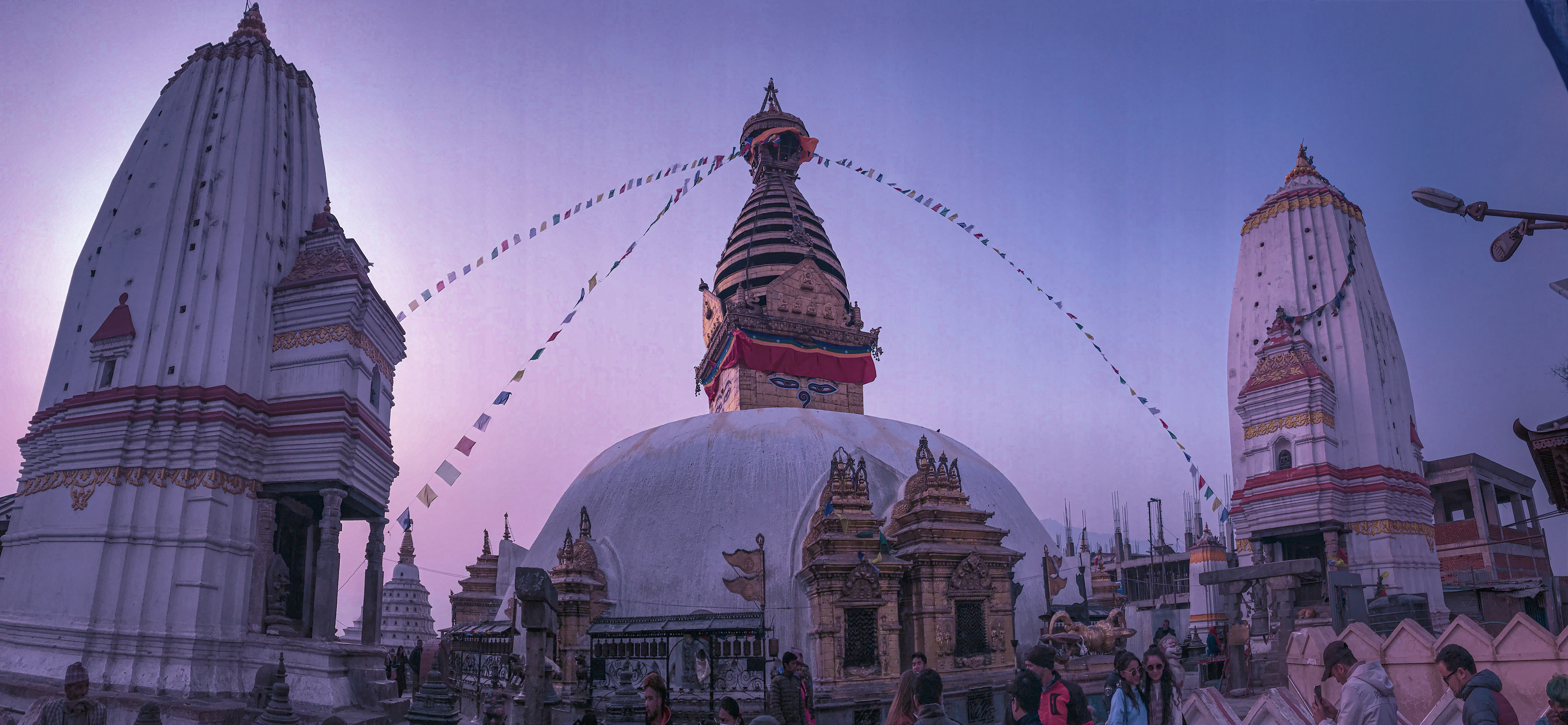
The white spire temples, Anantapur and Pratappur, erected by Pratap Malla in 1646 in Swayambhunath complex.

Additions and renovations of Swayambhunath complex were made during the reign of Pratap Malla. Access from Kathmandu was improved with the construction of a long stairway and a bridge across the Vishnumati. At the bottom of the 400 stone steps are three painted statues symbolizing the Three Precious Jewels of Buddhism, which were erected in 1637 by Pratap Malla and his son, Lakshmandra Singh Malla. Pratap Malla also placed a large vajra placed in front of the stupa. Flanking the vajra, he also added two white shikhar (spires) temples, known as Anantapur (southeast) and Pratappur (northeast), which were built in 1646 to house the protector deities Bhairav and Bhairavi.

=== Rani Pokhari (Nhu Pukhu) ===
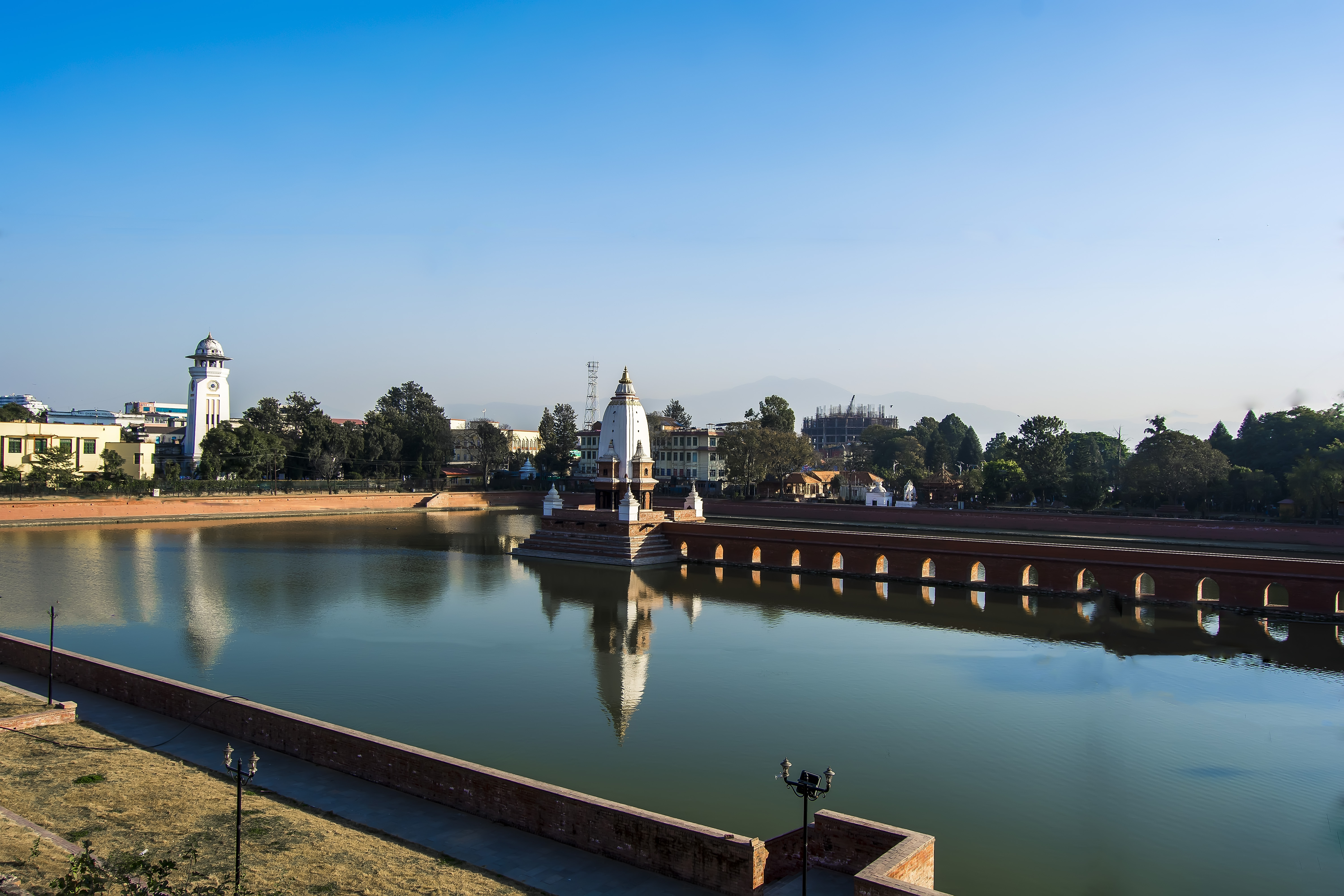
Ranipokhari, commissioned by Pratap Malla in 1669 CE.

Ranipokhari, locally known as Nhū Pukhū (Nepal Bhasa: 𑐴𑑂𑐣𑐹 𑐥𑐸𑐏𑐹, lit. 'new pond'), lies in the heart of Kathmandu, with about fifteen minutes walk from Kathmandu Durbar Square. Rani Pokhari is the artificial square-shaped pond with the temple of Shiva in the middle, which was built in 1669 CE (N.S. 789) by Pratap Malla. Pratap Malla had the pond constructed to console his queen who was distraught with grief after their son, Chakravatendra Malla, who, following his father's abdication in favor of his four sons each of whom would rule for one year, died on the second day of his reign, apparently having been trampled by an elephant.

The water with which the pond was originally filled was taken from fifty-one sacred rivers throughout Nepal and India, thus ensuring its sanctity. The temple in the middle of the pond is built in the Shikhara style. The main statue is of the Shiva lingam, but other deities also feature. Four small shrines at each corner contain images of Bhirav, Harishankar, Shakti, and Tarkeshwari. A large stone statue of an elephant bearing the statues of Pratap Malla and his two sons Chakravartendra Malla and Mahipatendra Malla is situated on the pond's southern embankment.

== Gallery ==
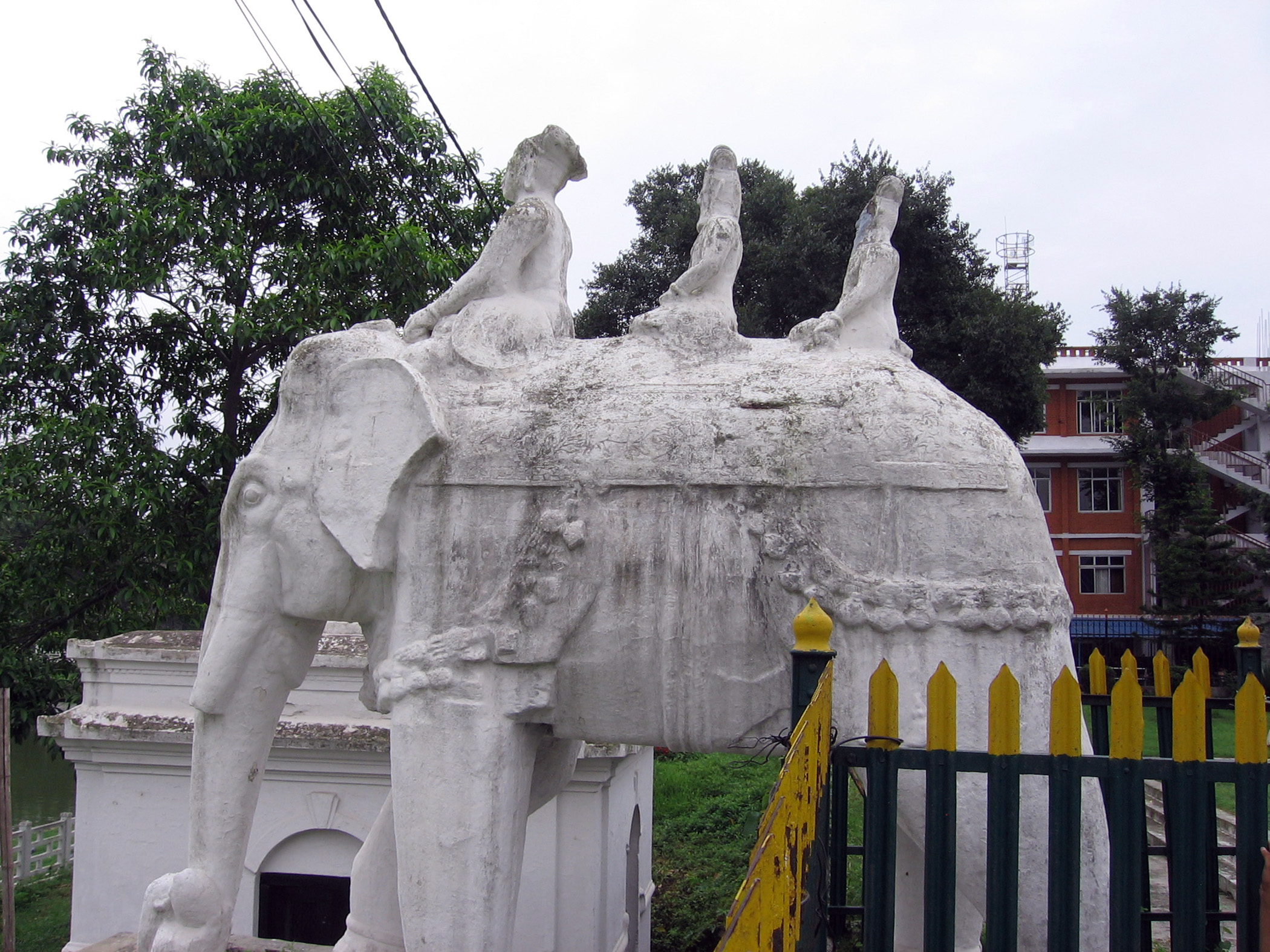
Statue of Pratap Malla riding elephant with his two sons, Chakravartendra Malla and Mahipatendra Malla.

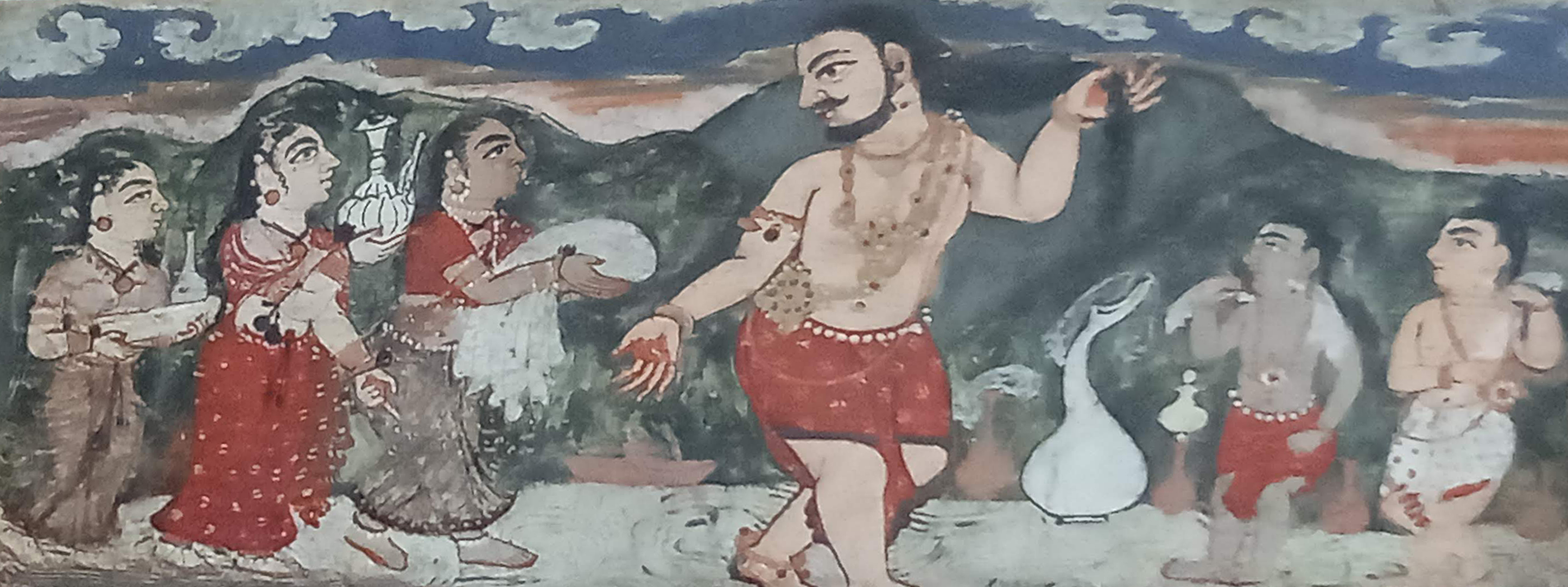
Manuscript painting showing King Pratap Malla collecting water from sacred sites for Rani Pokhari.

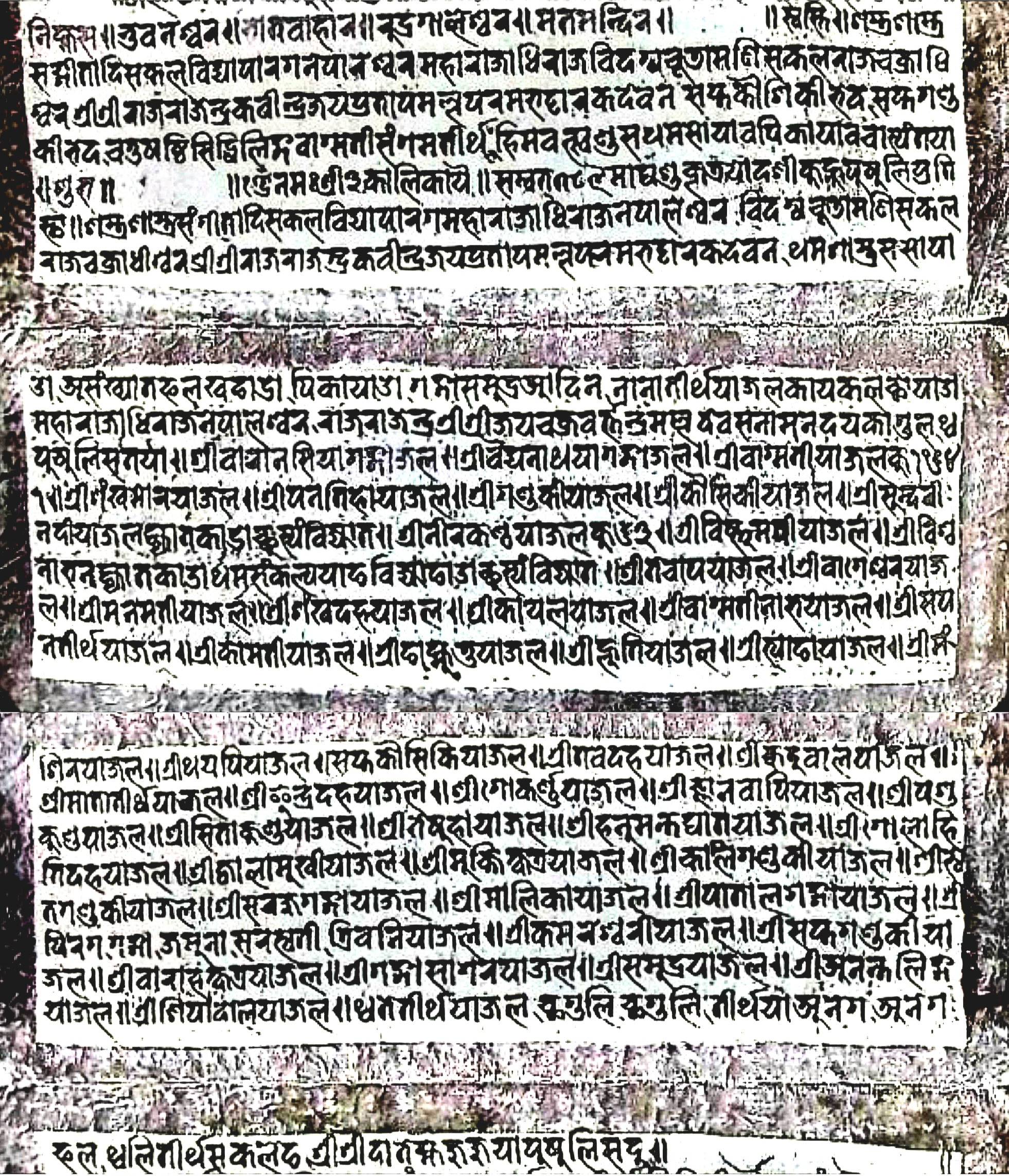
Tirthajatra manuscript, an account of the consecration of Ranipokhari written by Pratap Malla.

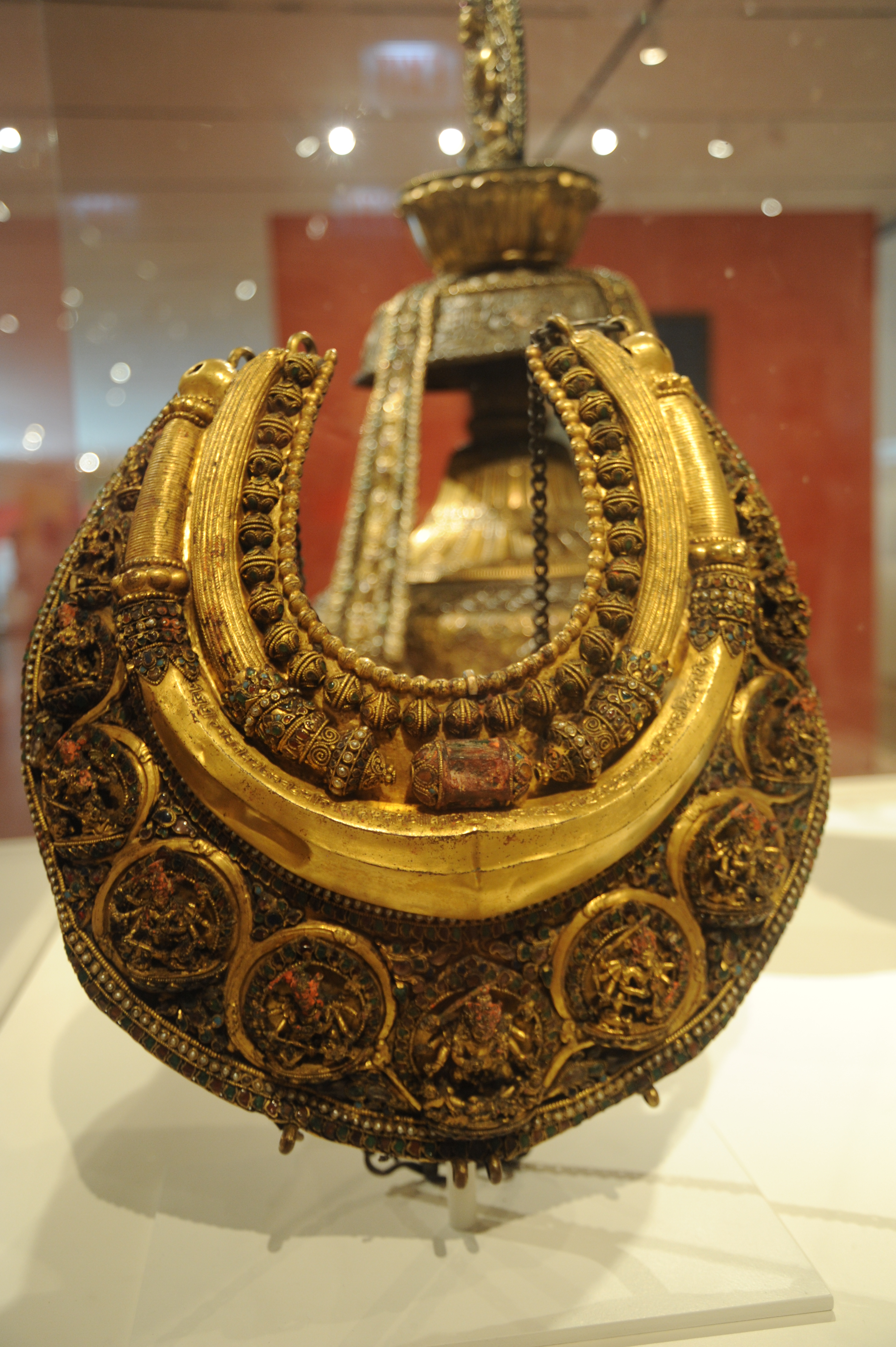
Necklace Inscribed with the Name of King Pratapamalladeva.

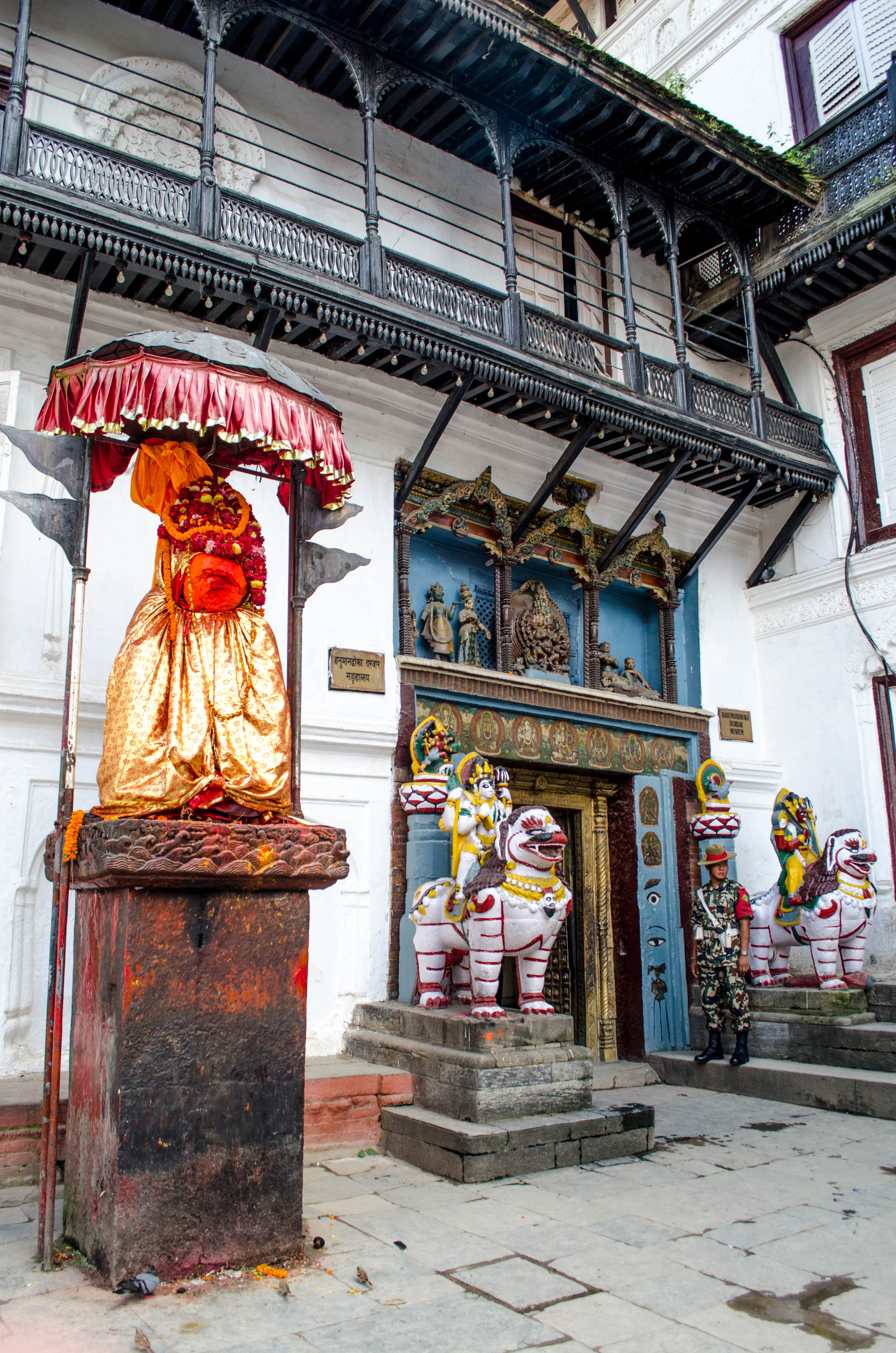
Statue of Hanuman at Hanuman Dhoka.

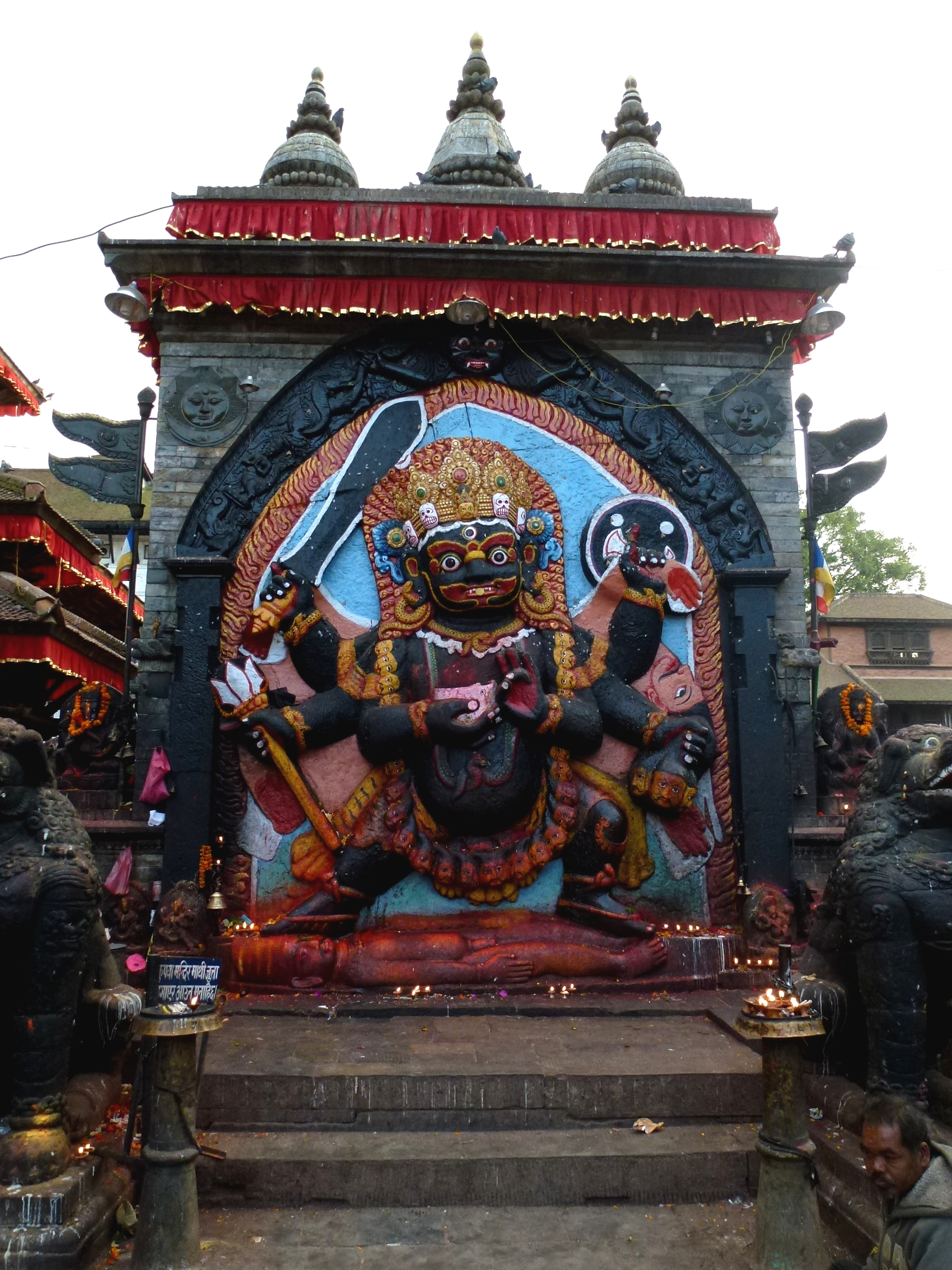
Statue of Kal Bhairav, at Kathmandu Durbar Square.

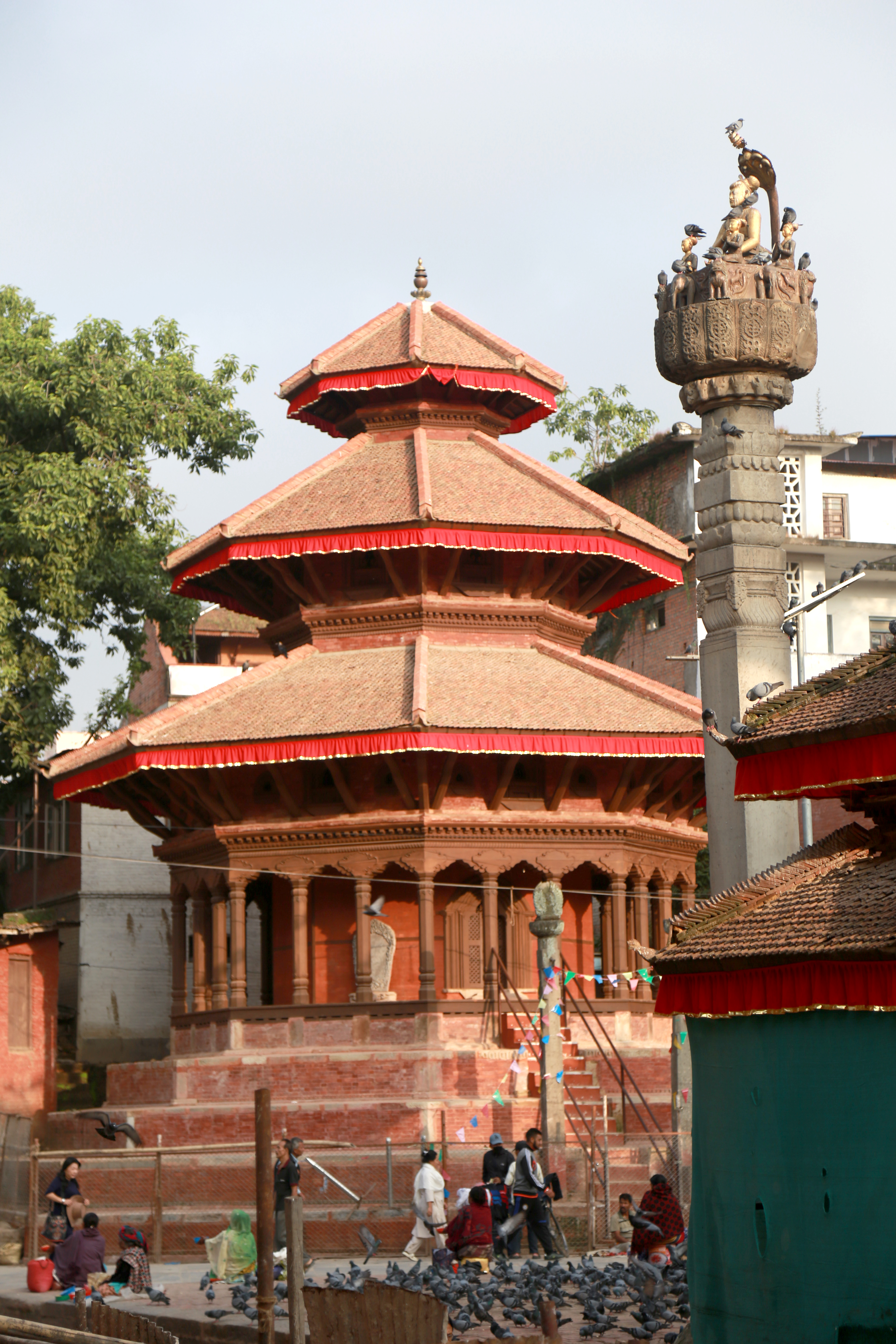
Chyasin Dega Temple

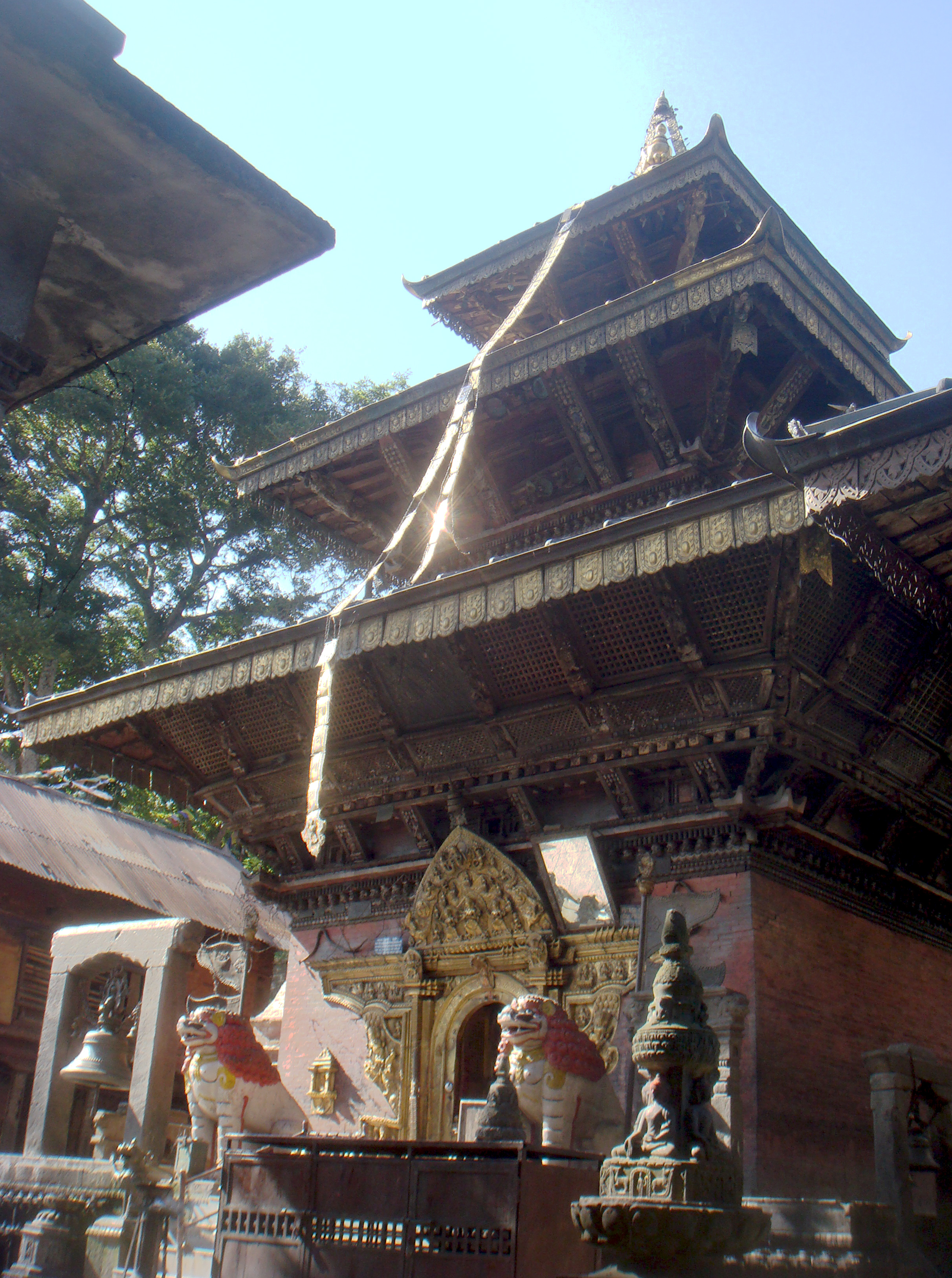
Bajrayogini Temple

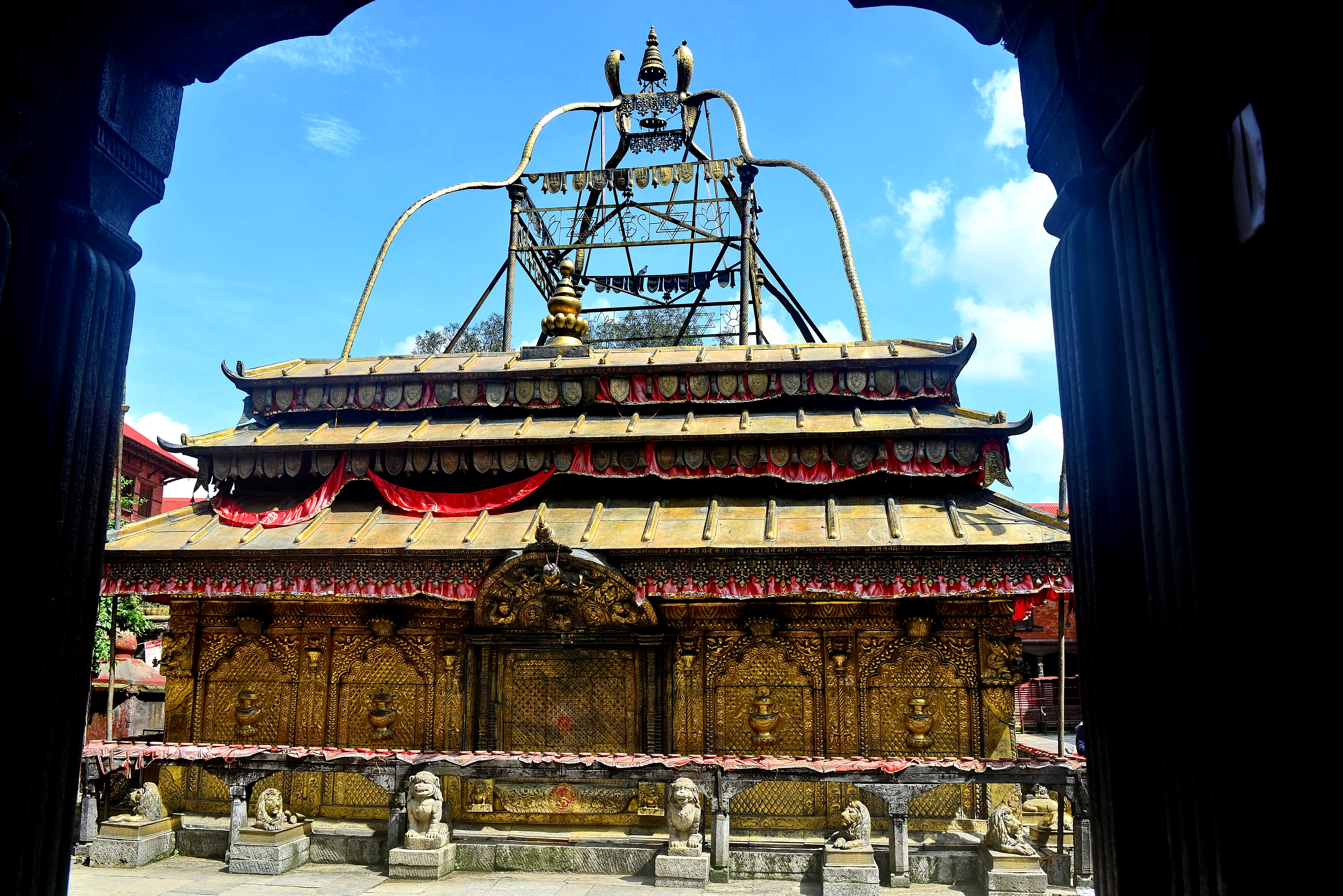
Guhyeshwari Temple

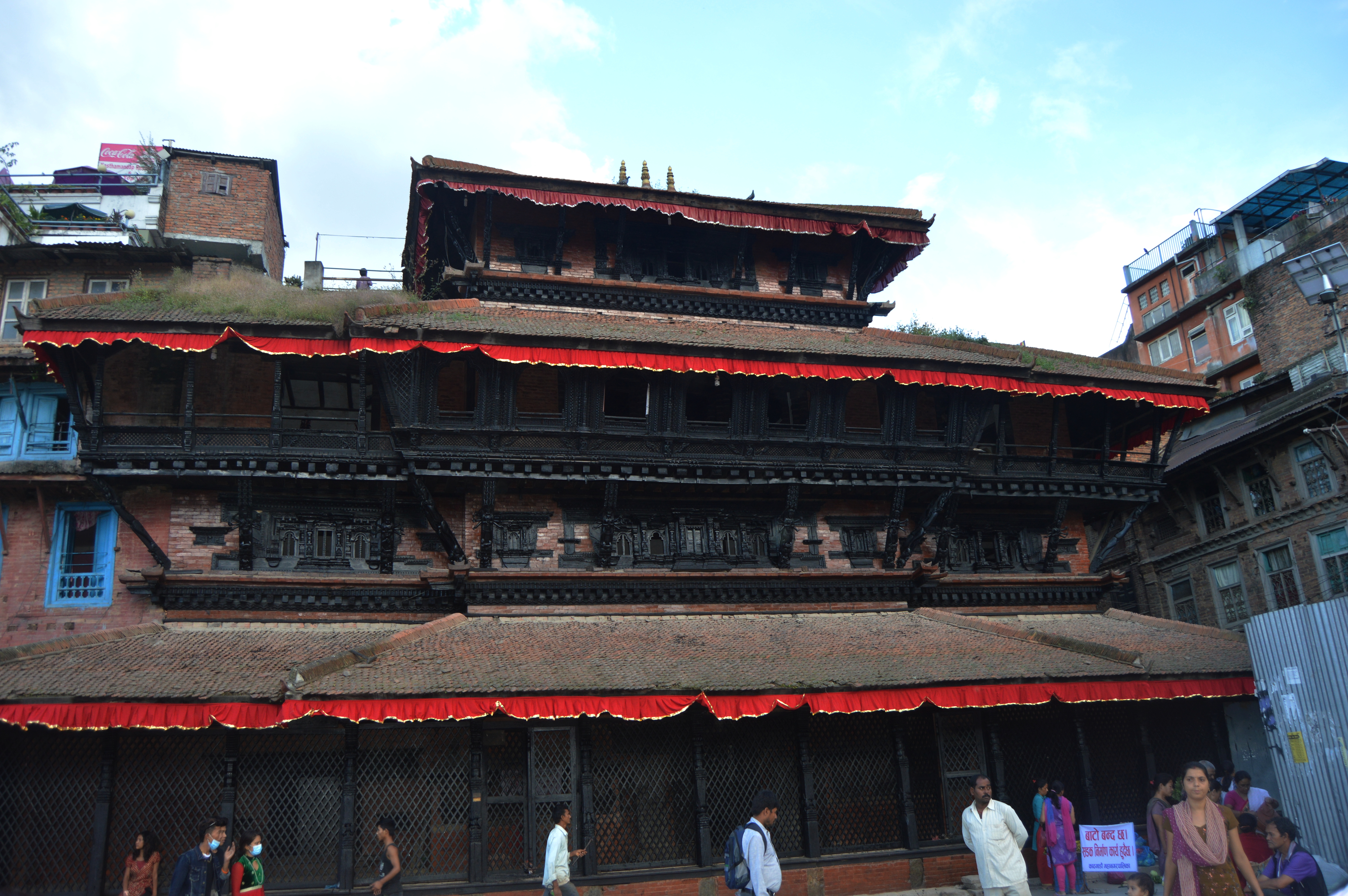
Kabindrapur

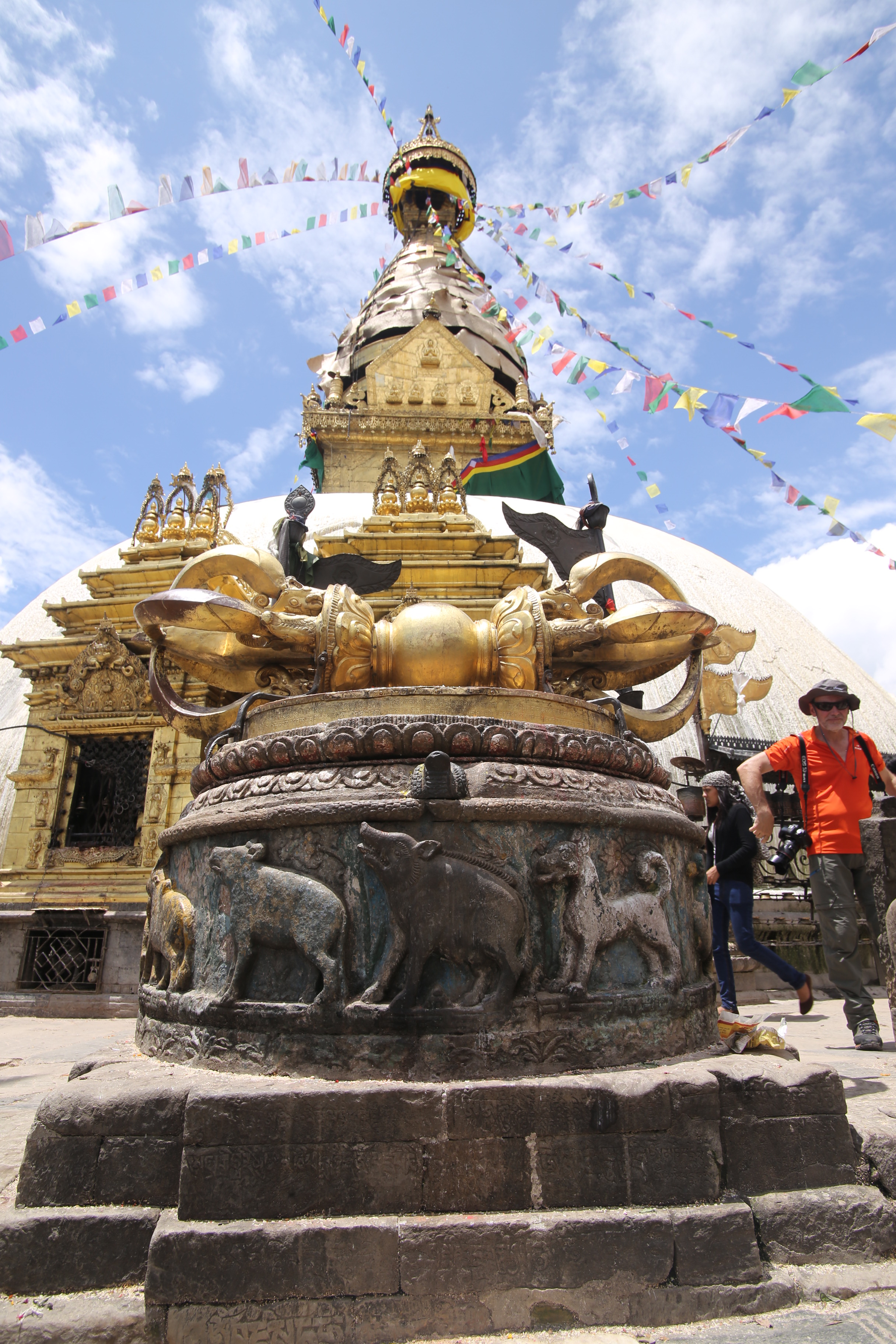
Vajra in front of Swayambhunath.

| Preceded by Lakshmi Narasimha Malla | King of Kantipur; 1641–1674 | Succeeded by Nripendra Malla |
