= Riddhi Lakshmi =

Nepalese Queen and Poet

- śrī śrī ṛddhi lakṣmī devī
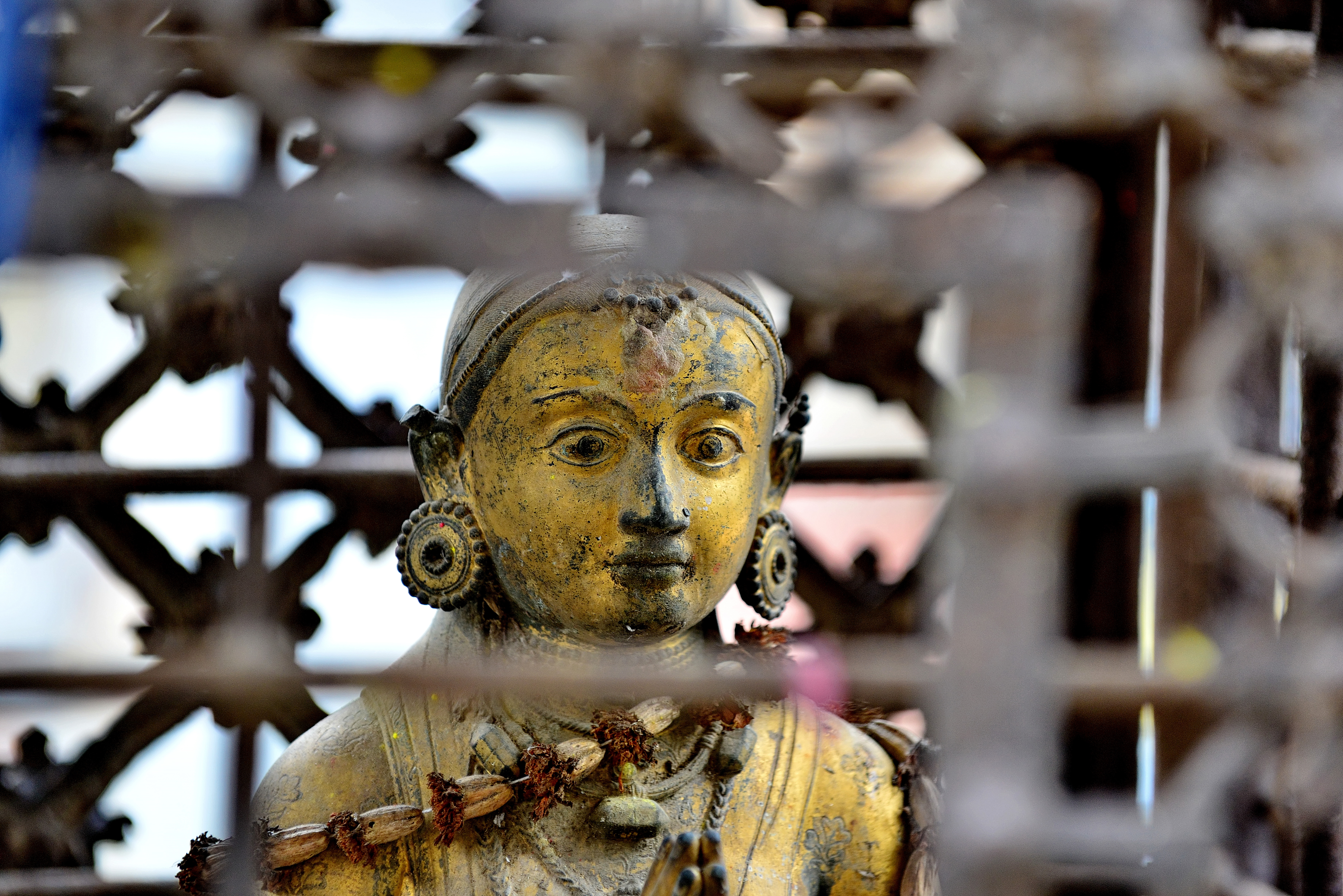
- Portrait at the Changu Narayan Temple

Queen Consort of Kantipur
- Tenure: 25 June 1680–2 July 1687
- Predecessor: Jaya Lakshmi
- Successor: Bhuvana Lakshmi

Queen regent of Kantipur
- Tenure: 2 July 1687– June 1697
- Born: Mithila
- Died: sometime after June 1697; Tavathali, Bhotekoshi (Present day Bahrabise, Bagmati Province, Nepal)
- Spouse: Parthibendra Malla
- Issue: Bhupalendra Malla
- Dynasty: Malla (by marriage)
- Religion: Hinduism

Riddhi Lakshmi (Nepal Bhasa: 𑐬𑐶𑐡𑑂𑐢𑐶𑐮𑐎𑑂𑐲𑑂𑐩𑐷) was the queen consort of the Nepalese Kingdom of Kantipur from 1680 to 1687 as the first wife of Parthibendra Malla and later served as regent for her son Bhupalendra Malla as well as a Newar language poet. Her poetry is the first attested literature written by a woman in Nepal. She served as the regent for her son from the time of her husband's death on 2 July 1687 when her son was eight years old, until their relationship fell off and she was exiled in June 1697 by her son to a place called Tavathali, near the banks of the Bhotekoshi River where she passed the rest of her life.
