= Bhupalendra Malla =

17th-century King of Kantipur

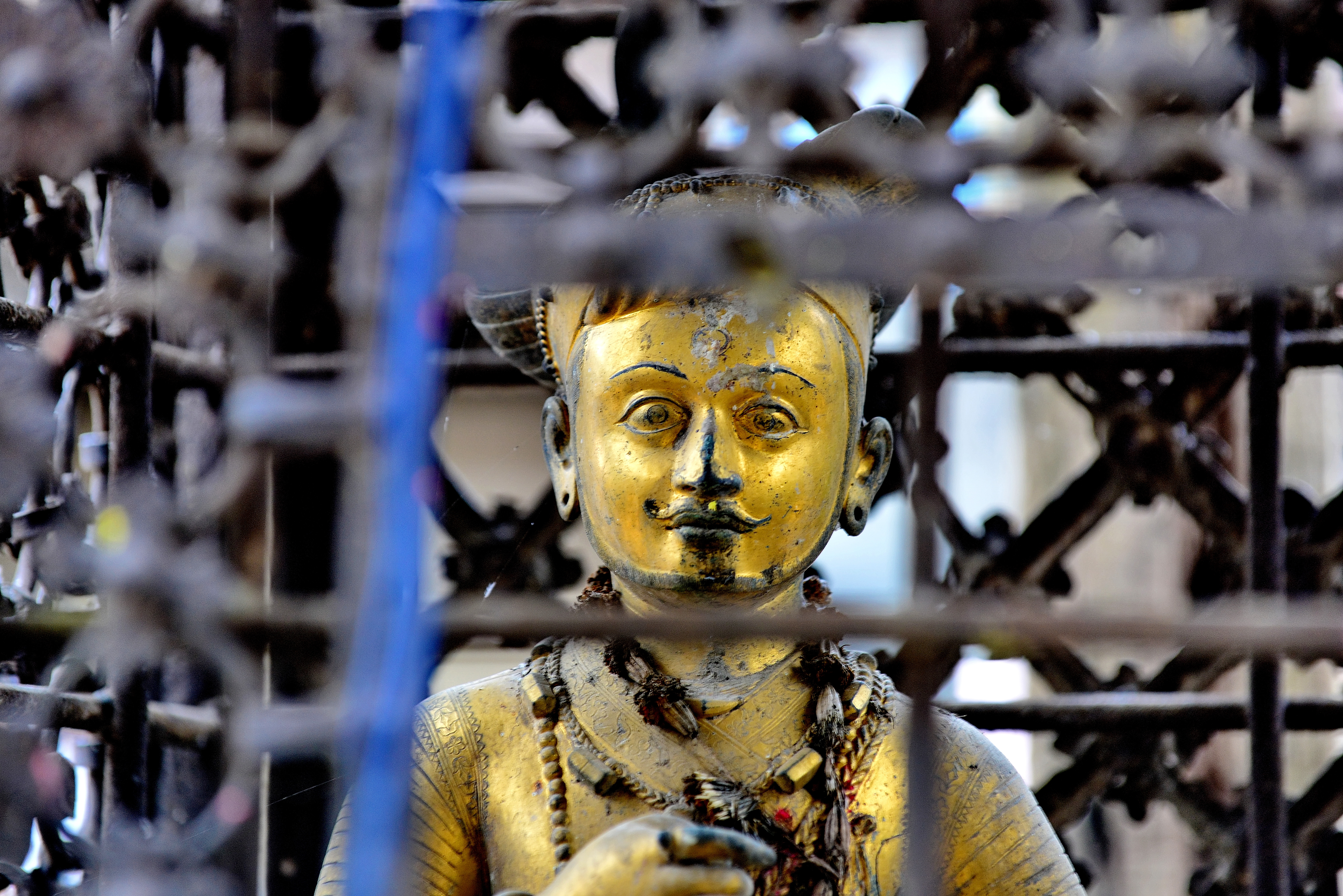
- Portrait at the Changu Narayan Temple

King of Kantipur
- Reign: 1687–1700
- Predecessor: Parthibendra Malla
- Successor: Bhaskara Malla
- Regent: Riddhi Lakshmi
- Born: 14 December 1679; Kathmandu, Kingdom of Kantipur, Nepal (Present day Bagmati Province, Nepal)
- Died: 1700 (aged 20–21); Ayodhya, Mughal Empire (Present day Uttar Pradesh, India)
- Spouse: Bhuwanalakshmi
- Issue: Bhaskara Malla
- Dynasty: Malla
- Father: Parthibendra Malla
- Mother: Riddhi Lakshmi

Bhupalendra Malla (Newar: 𑐨𑐸𑐥𑐵𑐮𑐾𑐣𑑂𑐡𑑂𑐬 𑐩𑐮𑑂𑐮) was a Malla ruler and the eleventh king of Kantipur. He succeeded his father Parthibendra Malla in 1687 as the King of Kantipur.

== Reign ==
Bhupalendra was born on NS 800 Agrahayana sukla dvadashi translating to 14 December 1679. He was just eight years old when he ascended the throne. His mother Riddhi Lakshmi acted as the regent. A minister named Lakshminarayan became the Chief Minister and supreme authority in the realm and even inscribed his name on the coins issued by Bhupalendra Malla. Lakshminarayan assassinated Chikuti, a prominent minister during the reign of Parthibendra Malla, and other significant nobles. Lakshminarayan was assassinated in 1690 following a rumor of illicit relationship with the regent, Riddhi Lakshmi.

Bhupalendra's relationship with his mother gradually worsened and he soon started undertaking the administration. He was fond of military activity but never had any significant battles with the neighboring kingdoms.

He died in 1700 at the age of 21 during his pilgrimage in Ayodhya and was succeeded by his son Bhaskara Malla.

== Literary works ==
Manuscript of Chora Chakravarti drama of Bhupalendra Malla

Bhupalendra Malla is known to have composed a drama named Chora Chakravarti in the Newar language.

Preceded by Parthibendra Malla	King of Kantipur; 1687–1700	Succeeded by Bhaskara Malla
