= Newar literature =

Literature in the Newar language

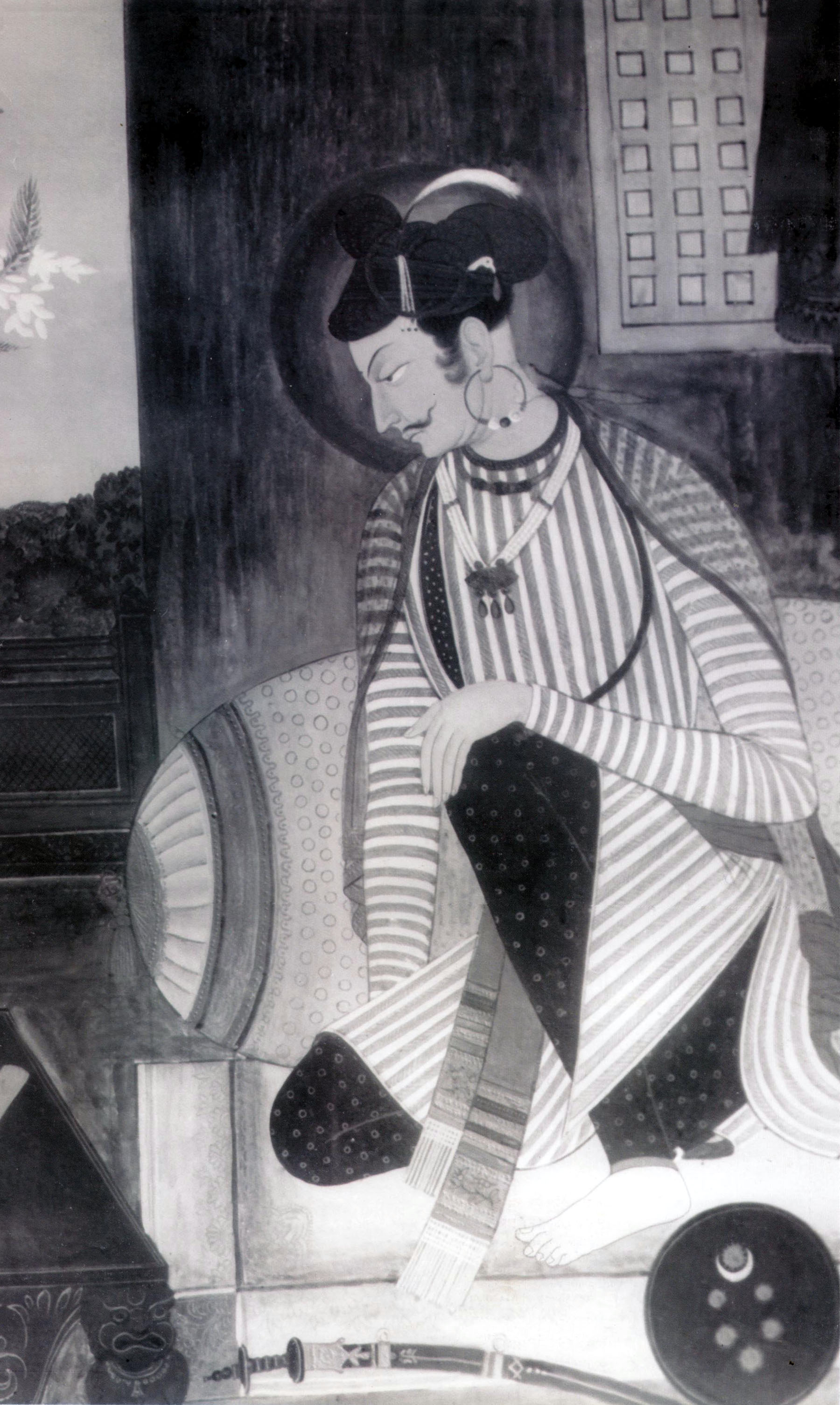
King Mahendra Malla (r. 1560–1574), the first Nepal Bhasa poet.

Newar literature (Newar: 𑐣𑐾𑐥𑐵𑐮𑐨𑐵𑐲𑐵 𑐳𑐵𑐴𑐶𑐟𑑂𑐫, Nepālabhāṣā Sāhitya) includes those literary texts written in the Newar language. The Newar language of Nepal is one of four Tibeto-Burman languages with an old literary tradition, with other three being Tibetan, Burmese, and Manipuri.

The earliest known document in Newar is called "The Palmleaf from Uku Bahal" which dates from 1114 during the Thakuri period. The earliest dated stone inscription in Nepal Bhasa is dated Nepal Sambat 293 (1173 CE). From the 14th century onwards, an overwhelming number of stone inscriptions in the Kathmandu Valley, where they are an ubiquitous element at heritage sites, are in Nepal Bhasa. The first books appeared in the 14th century are:

- Haramekhalā (𑐴𑐬𑐩𑐾𑐏𑐮𑐵), a medical manual written in 1374
- Mānava Nyāyaśāstra (𑐩𑐵𑐣𑐰 𑐣𑑂𑐫𑐵𑐫𑐱𑐵𑐳𑑂𑐟𑑂𑐬), a law book written in 1380
- Amarkośa (𑐀𑐩𑐬𑐎𑑀𑐱), a Sanskrit-Newari dictionary written in 1381
- Gopālarāja Vaṃśāvalī (𑐐𑑀𑐥𑐵𑐮𑐬𑐵𑐖 𑐰𑑄𑐱𑐵𑐰𑐮𑐷), a history of Nepal written in 1389

The first story book is Bhāgavata Purāṇa (1505), and the first one-act play is Ekādaśīvrata (1633) written by King Siddhi Narasimha Malla. Nepal Bhasa literature can be broadly divided into three periods:

- Newar literature
  - Classical Period (1374-1847)
    - Early Classical Period (1374-1768)
    - Late Classical Period (1768-1847)
  - Intermediate Period (1847-1941)
    - Dark Period (1847–1909)
    - Renaissance Period (1909–1941)
  - Modern Period (1941 onwards)

== Classical period ==
=== Early Classical period ===
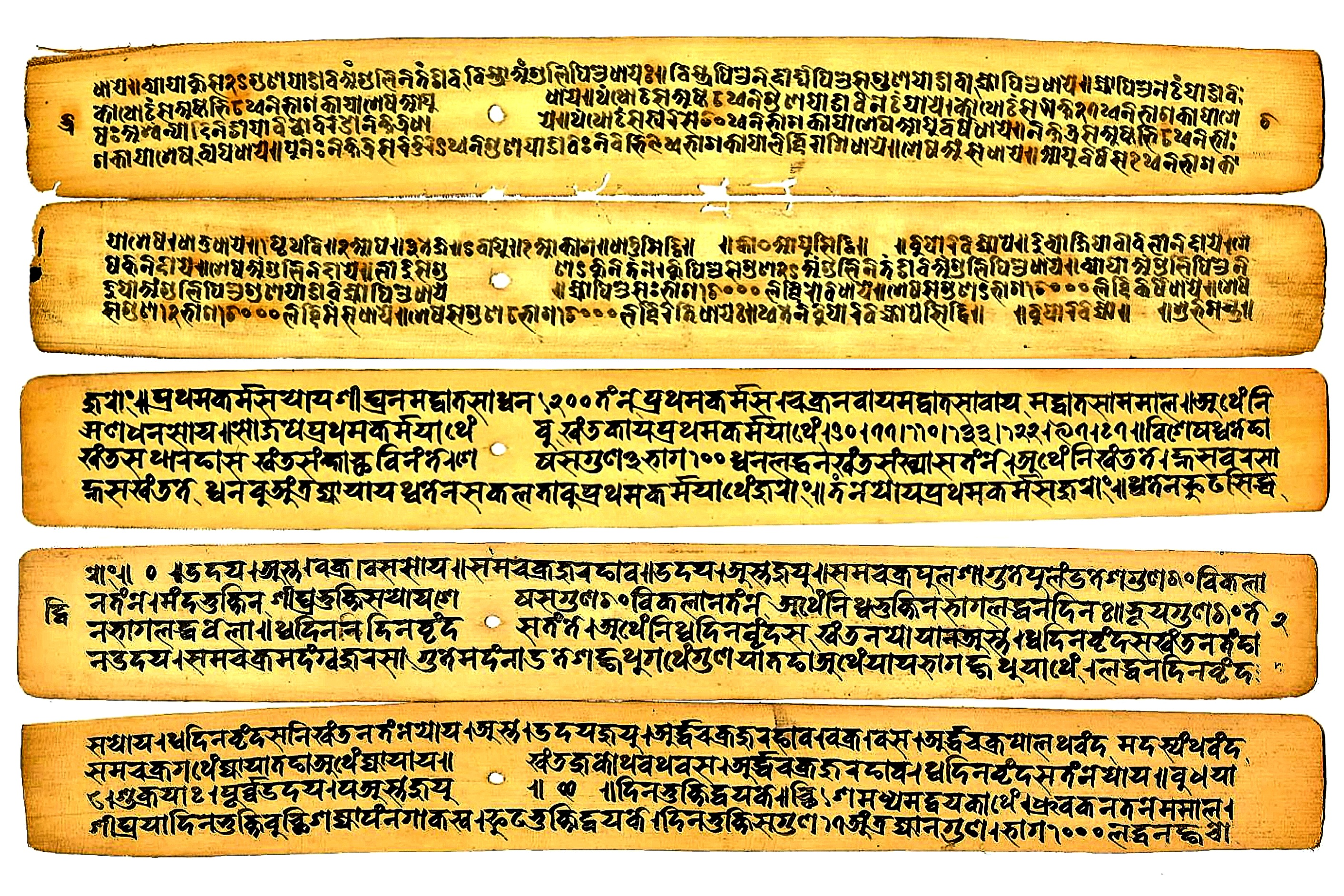
A 1408 CE palm-leaf manuscript of astrology in Classical Newar, written in Bhujimol script and Newar script.

The Early Classical period was a golden age of cultural development and art and architecture in Nepal Mandala besides being a prolific period for Nepal Bhasa literature. The literary genres prevalent during this era consist of chronicles, epics, stories, scientific manuals mainly dealing with astrology & medicine, didactic poems and drama.

The early works of Newar literature are prose works. The prose works in Newar literature are categorized as technical prose, historical prose, and narrative prose. The technical prose is mainly related to Shastras such as Astrology, Ayurveda, Dharmashastra, Kamashastra, Nītiśāstra, Vādyaśāstra, and mathematics. The Manava Nyaya Shastra and Haramekhalā are examples of early technical prose which deal with Dharmashastra and Ayurveda. Historical prose is divided into two forms: Vaṃśāvalī (chronicles) and Thyāsaphū (records and diaries about the court and kingdom). The Gopal Raj Vamshavali is the earliest written historical prose. Narrative prose is divided into three parts: religious, didactic, and popular. The earliest religious prose work in Newar is Svasthānī Bākhan. The earliest works in didactic and popular prose include Tantrākhyāna (1518) and Battisaputalikā.

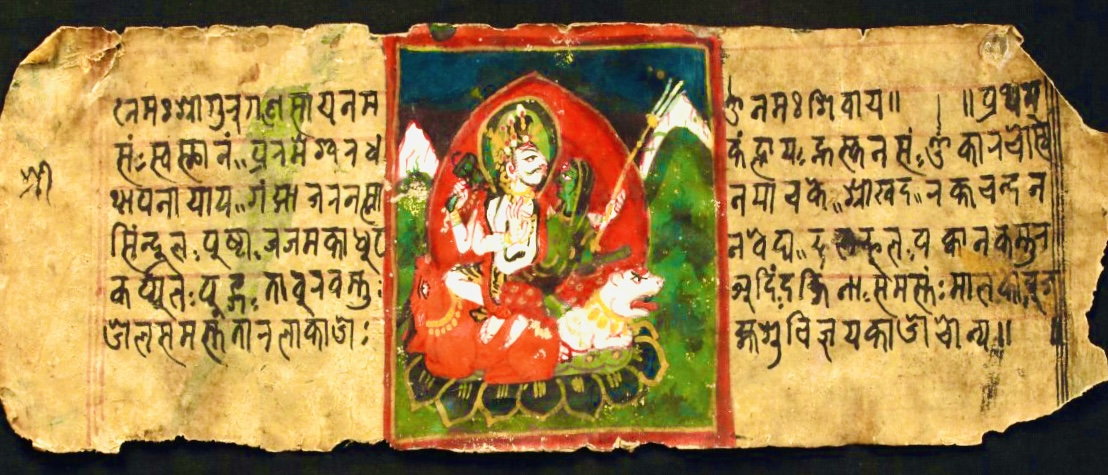
A 16th-century manuscript of Svasthānī Bākhan.

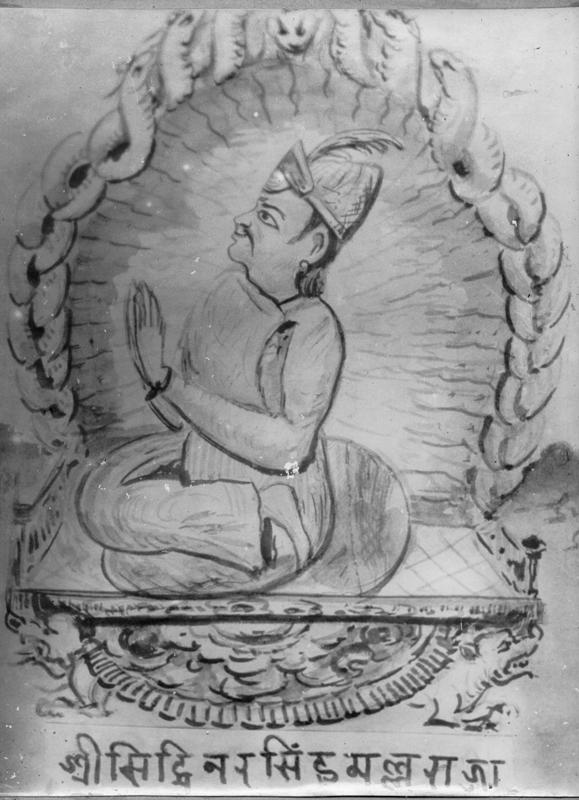
Siddhi Narasimha Malla, the first Newar playwright.

The kings and queens of the Malla dynasty were keen lyricists and playwrights. Dramas written at the time continue to be performed during annual festivals. King Mahendra Malla (reigned 1560–1574) is the first Newar poet. One notable poet who wrote many poems was Jagat Prakash Malla, who composed a collection of 519-poems called Nepālbhāsāyā Gita. Siddhi Narasimha Malla composed a 31-poem collection called Gopināthyā Gita, some of whose poems are still sung in Kartik Pyakhan. Similarly, Jagajjyoti Malla composed a poem collection called Nānārtha Pañcadaśa Gita. Srinivasa Malla is known for his poem nārāyaṇa suragana saṃsāra na bhina, which is the longest poem in the Newar language. Another prominent poet was Pratap Malla, who is known for giving himself the title of Kavindra ("the King of poets"). He composed 138 poems; however, 98 poems have been lost and only 40 poems have been found. The queen Riddhi Laxmi (1680–1687), is the Nepal's first woman poet as her poems are the earliest attested poems written by a woman. The queens Jaya Lakshmi, Bhuvan Lakshmi, Briddhi Lakshmi and Kumudini Devi were also prominent Newar poemwriters. Among the public, Jagat Keshari (1678) of Banepa in the east of the Kathmandu Valley is celebrated for a hymn dedicated to Goddess Chandesvari.

Siddhi Narasimha Malla was the first Nepal Bhasa playwright. He wrote the first Newar play entitled Ekādaśīvrata in 1633. His most famous work is Kārtika Pyākhan (1641) which is shown annually at Patan Durbar Square. Srinivasa Malla is known to have added seven days in Kārtika Pyākhan by adding his play Bāthaḥ Pyākhaṃ. Ranajit Malla’s Śaniścara Rohiṇī Pyākhan, is the longest play written in the Newar language. Jaya Prakash Malla wrote several dramas such as Ratneśvara Prādurbhāva, Viradhvajopākhyān Nātaka and Yayātyupākhyāna. Other playwriters during the classical period includes Yoga Narendra Malla, Bhupalendra Malla, Bhaskara Malla, Jagajjaya Malla, Jagat Prakasha Malla, and Bhupatindra Malla.

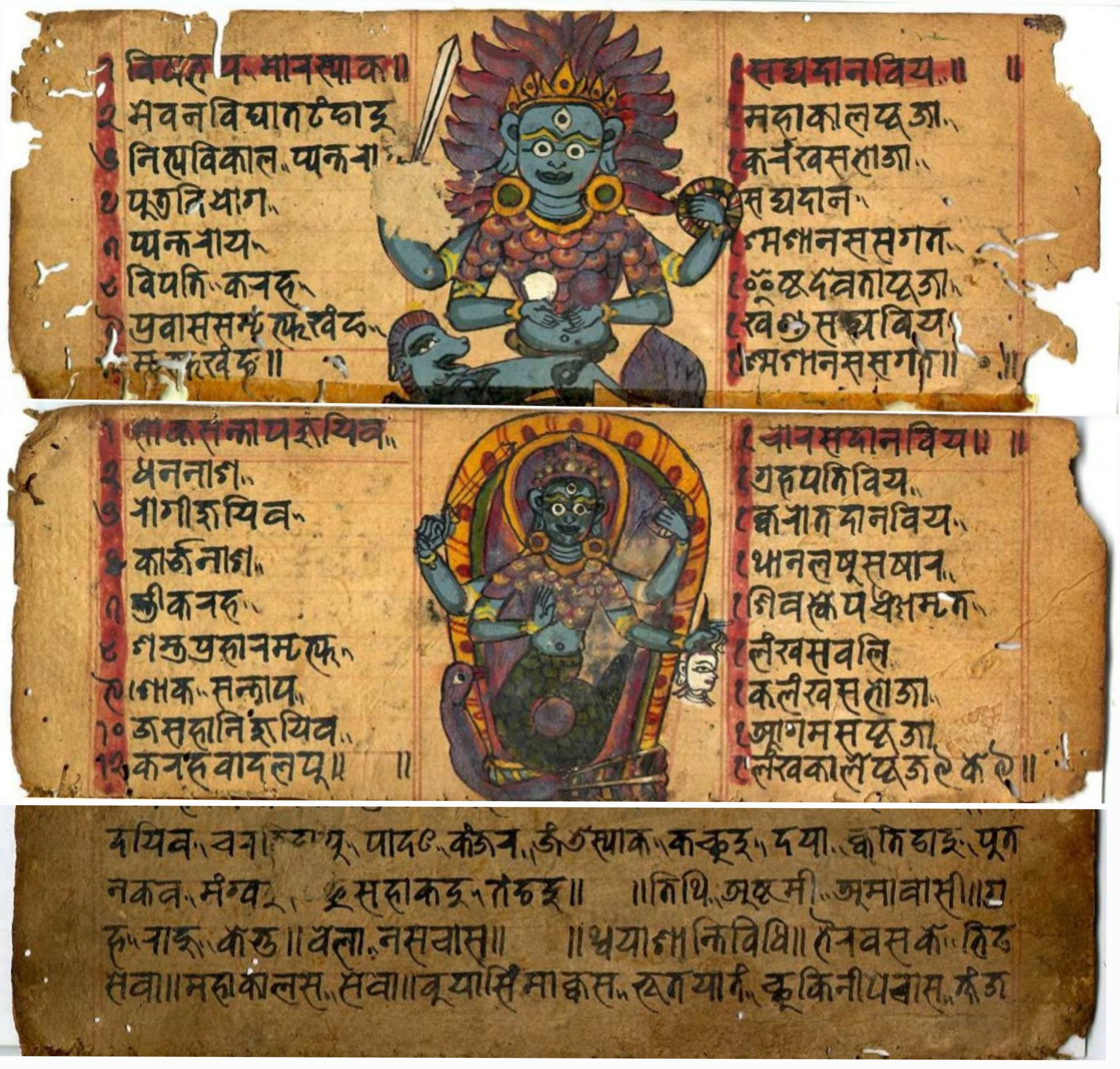
A ritual manual of Navagrahas written in the Newar language.

Other than original poems, plays, and stories, many translations and derivative works of Sanskrit texts were written in the Newar language during the early classical period. Kings like Jitamitra Malla and other rulers commissioned translations of Narapatijayacaryā (1690) and various other Sanskrit texts. King Jagajjyoti Malla himself translated and wrote commentaries in Newar on Sanskrit texts like Natyashastra. Many non royal authors like Dukhi Bhāro composed Newar version of the epic Ramayana and other religious texts. Similarly, numerous Puranic texts were translated, which expanded and enriched the corpus of religious literature. Some of Puranic works in Newar includes Mārkaṇḍeya Purāṇa (1617), Liṅga Purāṇa (1621), Paśupati Purāṇa (1632), Brahma Purāṇa (1695), and Svayambhū Purāṇa (1745).

During the 18th century, Newar also began to catch the interest of Capuchin friars from Italy who had started to settle in Nepal. By the time the mission ended in 1769 with the expulsion of all Christians by the Gorkhalis, the Capuchins had written many literature in Newar, including translations of several catechisms and apologetics and several Newar-Italian dictionaries. The Italian–Nepal Bhasa dictionary written in 1763 by Gaulbert da Massa during his stay as a Capuchin friar in Nepal, is the first alphabetically arranged dictionary of Nepal Bhasa and the first Nepal Bhasa dictionary written in European language.

=== Late Classical period ===
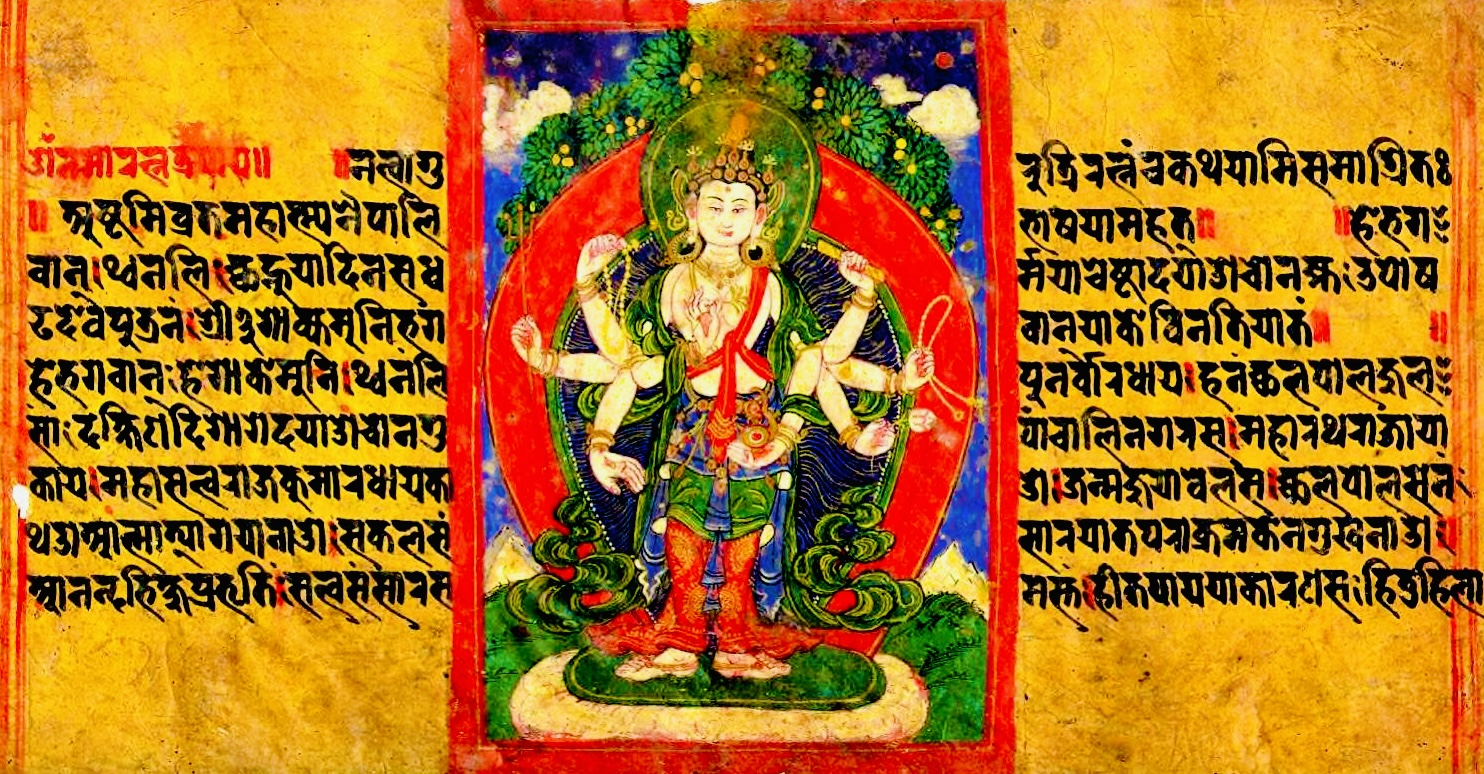
A page from the Aṣṭamīvrata Māhātmya, 18th century.

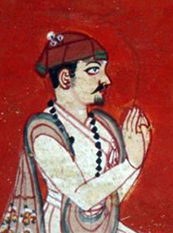
Pandit Amritananda Shakya

During the later part of the Classical period, early Shah kings patronized and wrote several poems, devotional songs and plays. Among the Shah kings, Rajendra Bikram is famed for writing Mahāsatva Pākhyān (1831), a play based on a Buddhist story. King Prithvipal Sen of Palpa, during his stay in Kathmandu Valley, had commissioned plays such as Hanumān Nāṭaka in the Newar language. Pandit Amṛtānanda Śākya composed several poems and wrote the play Hanumān Nāṭaka in 1800 under the commission of King Prithvipal Sen. Besides composing poetry and play, he also wrote the first grammar of Nepal Bhasa in 1831 and a devotional hymn called Carapatipāda Stotra. Similarly, Pandit Sundarānanda (circa 1793–1833) wrote a epic and poems. Vijayānanda Rājopādhyāya, who was a Sanskrit court poet in the court of Girvan Yuddha Bikram Shah, composed many poems and hymns in the Newar language.

A number of prose works and stories during the late classical period were narratives based on Ramayanas, and Avadānas. Some of these include Maheśvara Āju's Rāmāyaṇa (1784), Bhājurāma Karmācārya's Saptakāṇḍa Rāmāyaṇa (1818), Adhyātma Rāmāyaṇa (1829), and a Rāmāyaṇa by an unknown author dated to 1846. Similarly, some Avadāna stories include Kuśāvadāna (1778), Aṣṭamīvrata Māhātmya (1777), and Ahorātravrata Kathā (1840).

== Intermediate period ==
=== Dark Period ===
After the Gorkha conquest of Nepal in 1768 and the advent of the Shah dynasty, the Nepali language, formerly known as Khas kura or Gorkhali, began gradually edging out Newari. Overt suppression was started by the Rana dynasty (1846–1951). In 1905, official documents written in Newari were declared illegal. The use of the language in land registration, business and literary purposes was forbidden. Books were confiscated and writers were jailed. As a result, not only literary creations but also writing for general purposes almost ceased; and the distance between the spoken and the written language began to widen.

Several poems, hymns and religious stories were produced during this period. Notable writers of the era were Ranabir Singh Thapa (younger brother of famed prime minister Bhimsen Thapa), Hari Bhakta Mathema, Man Bahadur Joshi and Bir Bahadur Malla.

=== Renaissance Period ===
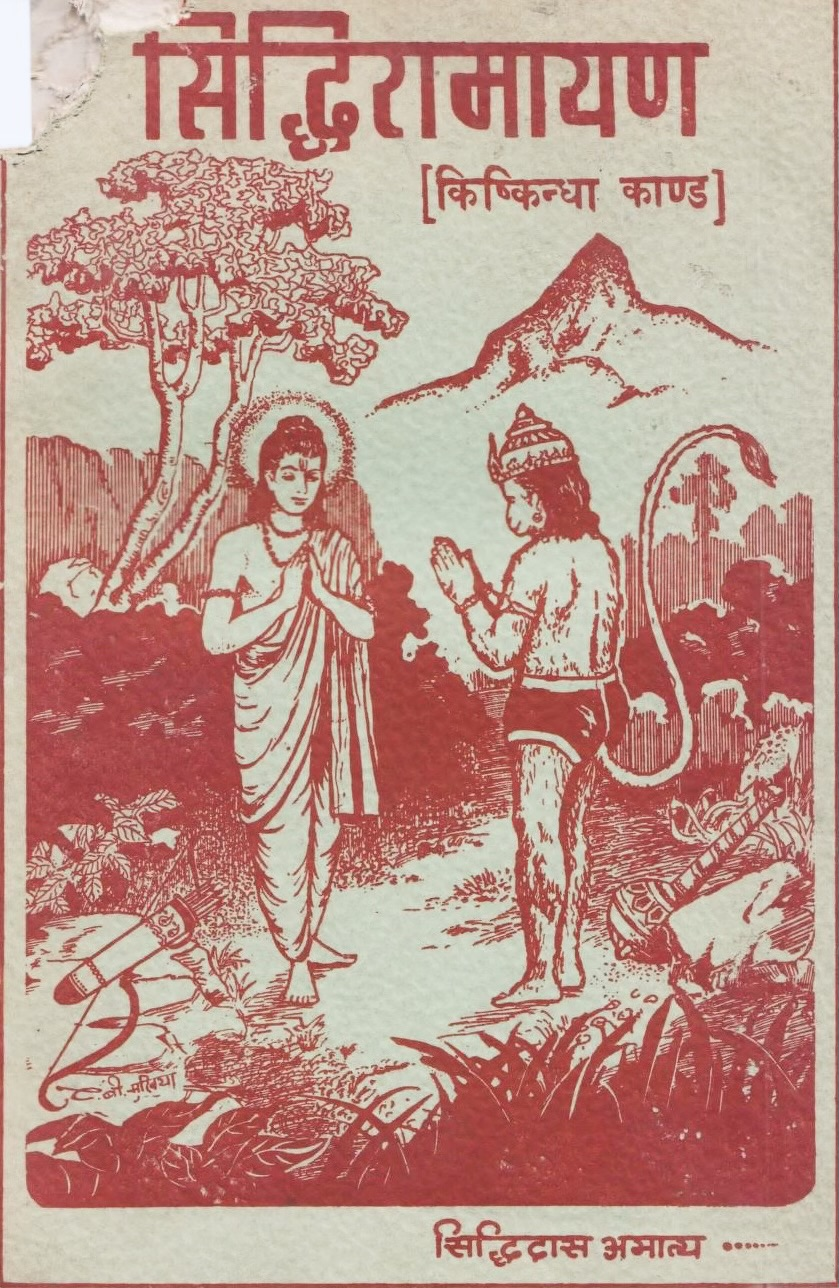
Illustrated cover folio of Siddhidas Mahaju's Siddhi Rāmāyaṇa

During renaissance period, a new generation of writers emerged who asserted themselves by producing literary works defying government restrictions. The renaissance aimed to restore the Newar language's lost glory and stimulate creative literature. The activities of this period laid the foundation for the future course of the language. The Nepal Bhasa movement dates from this period.

The renaissance also marked the advent of private printing presses and the end of handwritten books. In 1909, Nisthananda Bajracharya published the first printed book in Newari, Ek Vimśati Prajñāpāramita, a Buddhist text. In 1913, Siddhidas Mahaju composed Siddhi Ramayana, a Newar version of the Hindu epic. Jagat Sundar Malla worked to promote education. In 1925, Dharmaditya Dharmacharya published Buddha Dharma wa Nepal Bhasa, the first ever magazine in Newari, from Kolkata, India. Authors also worked to standardize the grammar and spelling, and new literary styles and genres were embraced. A grammar of the language, the first in modern times, was published in 1928 by Shukraraj Shastri. The most important figures of this era were:

- Nisthananda Bajracharya
- Siddhidas Mahaju
- Jagat Sundar Malla
- Yogbir Singh Kansakar
- Shukraraj Shastri
- Dharmaditya Dharmacharya

These writers spearheaded the revival of the language. Among the leaders of the renaissance, Bajracharya, Mahaju, Malla and Kansakar are honored as the Four Pillars of Nepal Bhasa.

== Modern period ==
The 1940s marked the beginning of the modern period in Newari literature. During modern period, new genres like short stories, poems, essays, novels and plays were written.

=== The jail years ===
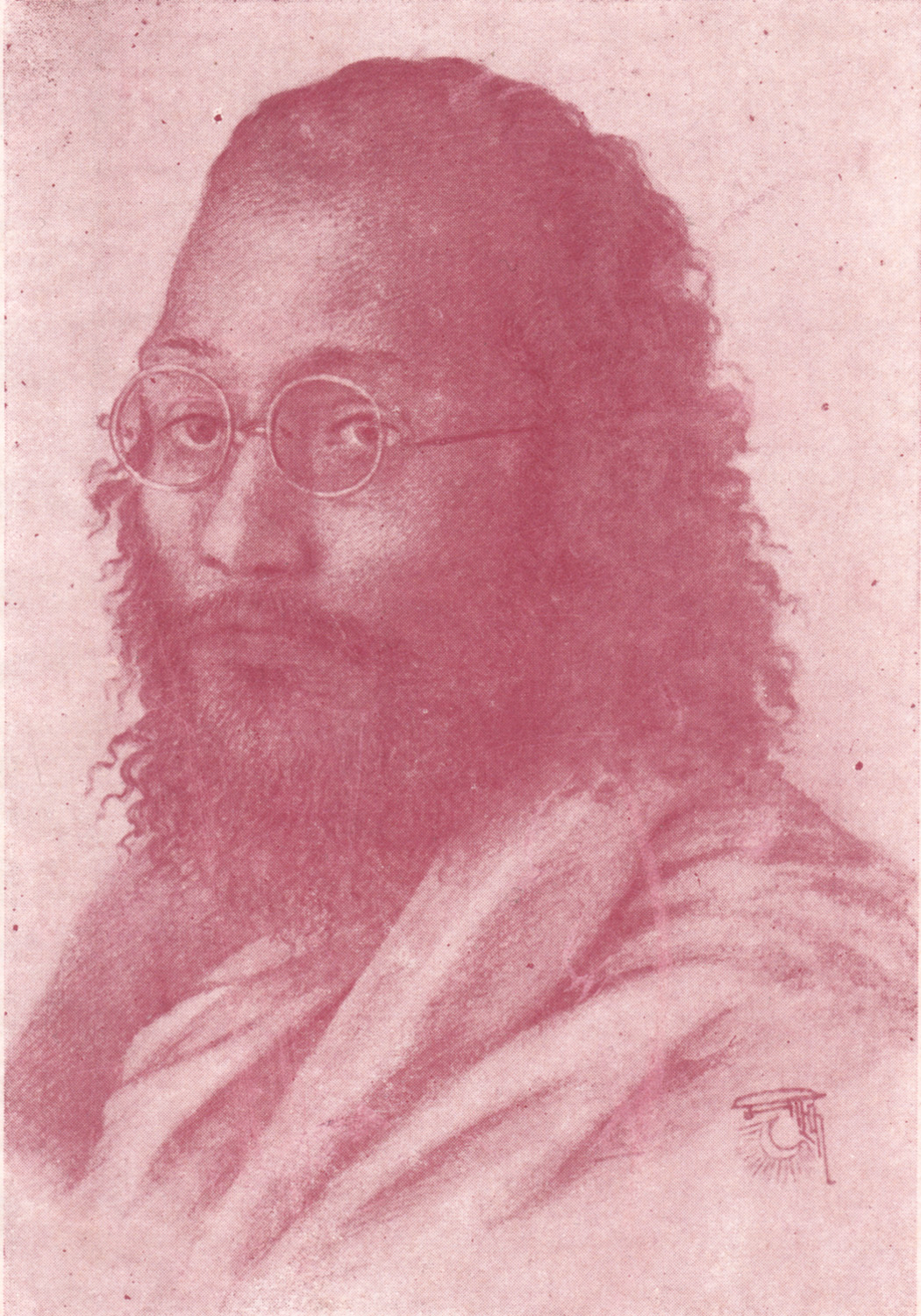
Chittadhar Hridaya, sketched in jail, ca. 1944.

The years 1941–1945 are known as the jail years for the large number of authors who were imprisoned for their literary or political activities. They were a productive period and resulted in an outpouring of works. Chittadhar Hridaya, Siddhicharan Shrestha and Phatte Bahadur Singh were among the prominent writers of the period who were jailed for their writings. While in prison, Hridaya produced his greatest work Sugata Saurabha, an epic poem on the life of the Buddha. Shrestha wrote a collection of poems entitled Sisvān ("Wax Flower", published in 1948) among other works. Singh (1902-1983) was sentenced to life imprisonment for editing and publishing an anthology of poems by various poets entitled Nepali Bihar. He had the book printed in Bettiah, India in 1939 and shipped to Nepal. After half of the print run had been sold, the rest of the copies were confiscated; and the contributors along with Singh were put in prison. Singh is best known as the founder of Nepal Bhasa Patrika, the first daily newspaper in Nepal Bhasa which began publication in Kathmandu in 1955. He was the editor and publisher. Poets like Kedar Man Vyathit and Dharma Ratna Yami, who had been jailed on political charges, began writing in Newari too during their time in prison.

In 1944, the Ranas exiled eight monks for refusing to stop teaching Buddhism and writing in Newari. They went to Sarnath, India and formed an organization named Dharmodaya Sabha. In 1947, the association launched a monthly magazine titled Dharmodaya from Kalimpong. Besides providing an opportunity for the growing number of writers, it had a major effect on standardizing the language. In 1946, the monks were allowed to return, and religious writing in Newari was permitted to be published after being censored. Some prominent Buddhist authors were Bauddha Rishi Mahapragya, Dhammalok Mahasthavir, Pragyananda Mahasthavir and Aniruddha Mahathera.

=== Post-democracy ===
The overthrow of the Ranas in 1951 and move towards democracy brought a freer environment to writers. The 1950s saw a surge in literary activity and the appearance of new authors. Moti Laxmi Upasika (1909–1997) was the first woman poet and short story writer in the modern period. Satya Mohan Joshi (1920-2022) was a poet, historian and cultural expert. The epic Jaya Prakāśa (published in 1955) about the last Malla king of Kathmandu, and Aranikoyā Śveta Caitya (published in 1984) about the Nepalese artist Araniko who went to China in the 13th century, are two of his many notable works. Madan Mohan Mishra (1931–2013) is known for his epic poetry and satire. His Gajiguluyā Mhagasay Paśupatinātha ("Pashupatinath in the Dreams of a Marijuana Smoker"), published in 1975, is one of his most loved works.

Rebati Ramanananda Shrestha (1932–2002) was one of the young generation of writers that emerged in the 1950s. His early works include Malakha ("Dragon", a collection of poems, published in 1955), Kapan ("Rainbow", short stories, 1956) and Uphosvān ("Blue Lotus", story, 1956). Durga Lal Shrestha (born 1937) is a prolific, versatile and popular poet and songwriter. His works range from a collection of children's poems and songs entitled Ciniyāmha Kisicā ("Sugar Elephant") to romantic and progressive compositions that have earned him the epithet of People's Poet. Ganesh Lal Shrestha of Hetauda composed songs and gave music recitals during festivals in the 1940s and 1950s. In Pokhara, the first Grand Nepal Bhasa Literary Conference was held from 17–18 December 1975. Girija Prasad Joshi (1939–1987) was a poet whose works encompass romantic to progressive poetry.

=== Panchayat era ===
In 1960, parliament was abolished and the Panchayat system was established. Under the system's one-language policy, Nepal Bhasa suffered another period of suppression. In 1965, the language was banned from being broadcast over Radio Nepal. The removal of Newari from Nepal's only radio station sparked a protest movement which became known as the Movement of 1965 ("Bais Salya Andolan"). As part of the protests, weekly literary meets were held at street squares and public courtyards for more than a year. Inspired by the literary activity, a host of new and young writers emerged. Poets Buddha Sayami, Nati Bajra Bajracharya, Shree Krishna Anu and Janak Newa and novelist Ratna Bahadur Sayami are some of the figures brought up by the protests. They introduced fresh literary styles and extended the bounds of Nepal Bhasa literature. The 1965 Movement was thus a very productive period. Birat Nepal Bhasa Sahitya Sammelan Guthi (Grand Newari Literary Conference Trust), formed in 1962 in Bhaktapur, and Nepal Bhasa Manka Khala, founded in 1979 in Kathmandu, are some of the prominent organizations that emerged during this period to promote literature and struggle for language rights.

=== Today ===
Newari literature has a niche readership. Poetry, short stories, essays, novels, travelogues, biographies and religious discourses are the popular genres. A number of literary magazines are published. Translations of Nepal Bhasa literature in English and Nepali appear frequently. Literary organizations hold regular public recitals. Shashikala Manandhar is the first female novelist writing in the Nepal Bhasa language.

== Literary genres ==
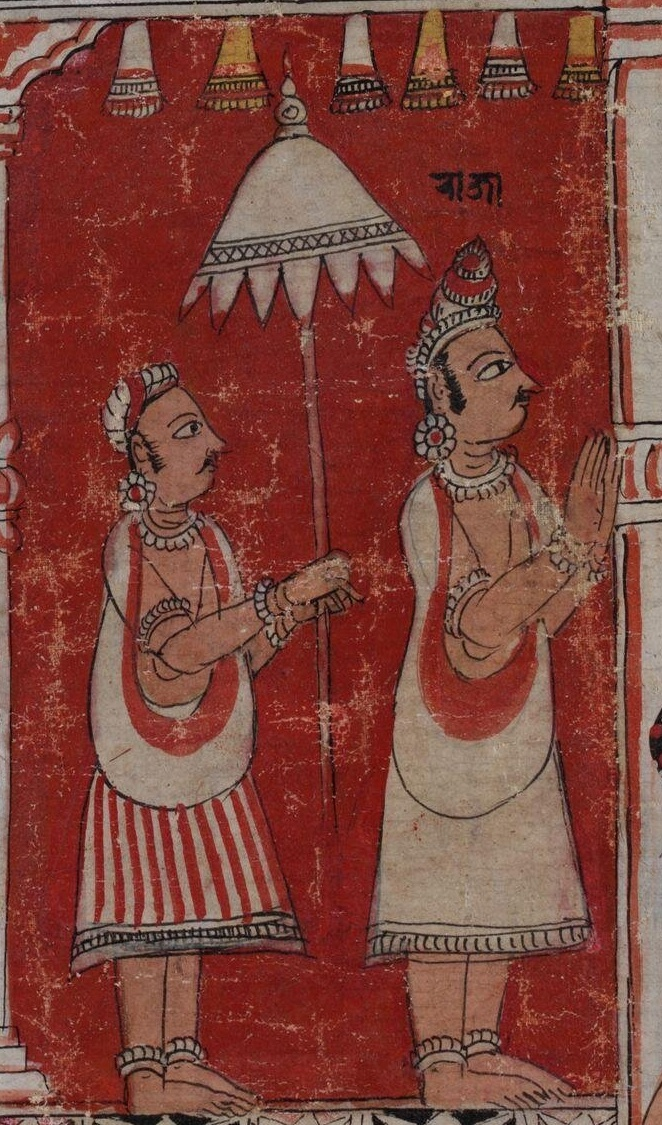
Jagat Prakash Malla is often considered one of the greatest Newar poets.

- Poetry writing constituted a pompous part of medieval Malla aristocracy. Many of the kings were well-renowned poets. Epic poetry is very popular. Sitala Maju, which describes the expulsion of children from Kathmandu in the early 19th century, Ji Waya La Lachhi Maduni, about a luckless Tibet trader, and Silu, about an ill-fated pilgrimage to Gosaikunda, are among the well-known ballads.
- Dramas are traditionally performed on open "dabu" (platform) built at temple squares and major intersections. Most of dramas are narrated with the help of songs sung at intervals and dialougues.
- Stories ranging from secular works such as Dhon Cholecha to religious works such as Swasthani Bakhan have been written in Newari.
- History literature in Newari dates from the Malla era. Stone inscriptions were placed in important places to commemorate important events. Mention of family genealogy and chronicle of the person instilling the inscription is also found in many cases.
- Legal literature formulated during the reign of Jayastithi Malla formulated a major part of the norm of Newar society.

== Sources ==
=== Books ===
- Bajracharya, Phanindra Ratna (2003). Who's Who in Nepal Bhasha. Kathmandu: Nepal Bhasa Academy.
- Brown, T. Louise (1996). The Challenge to Democracy in Nepal: A Political History. Routledge. ISBN 0-415-08576-4.
- Gutschow, Niels (1997). The Nepalese Caitya: 1500 Years of Buddhist Votive Architecture in the Kathmandu Valley. Edition Axel Menges. ISBN 9783930698752.
- Grandin, Ingemar (1989). Music and Media in Local Life: Music Practice in a Newar Neighbourhood in Nepal. Linköping: Linköping University.
- LeVine, Sarah; Gellner, David N. (2005). Rebuilding Buddhism: The Theravada Movement in Twentieth-Century Nepal. Harvard University Press. ISBN 978-0-674-01908-9.
- Lewis, Todd T.; Tuladhar, Subarna Man (2009). Sugata Saurabha: An Epic Poem from Nepal on the Life of the Buddha by Chittadhar Hridaya. Oxford University Press. ISBN 9780195341829.
- Lienhard, Siegfried (1974). Nevārīgītīmañjarī: Religious and Secular Poetry of the Nevars of the Kathmandu Valley. Stockhol: Almqvist & Wiksell.
- Lienhard, Siegfried (1992). Songs of Nepal: An Anthology of Nevar Folksongs and Hymns. New Delhi: Motilal Banarsidas. hdl:10125/23034. ISBN 81-208-0963-7.
- Mahasthavir, Bhikkhu Dharmaloka (1999). A Pilgrimage in China. Kathmandu: Bhikkhu Aniruddha Mahasthavir.
- Malla, Kamal Prakash (1982). Classical Newari Literature: A Sketch. Kathmandu: Educational Enterprise. LCCN 83900126.
- Malla, Kamal P. (1979). The Road to Nowhere. Kathmandu: The Sajha Publication.
- Pal, Pratapaditya (1985). Art of Nepal: A Catalogue of the Los Angeles County Museum of Art Collection. University of California Press. ISBN 978-0-520-05407-3.
- Shrestha, Siddhicharan (1992). Siddhicharanya Nibandha ("Siddhicharan's Essays"). Kathmandu: Phalcha Pithana.
- Tamot, Kashinath (1998). Nepalbhasha Sahityaya Dhwo Kiya (in Newari). Kathmandu, Nepal: Nasana Publication.
- Tuladhar, Premshanti (2000). Nepal Bhasa Sahityaya Itihasa [The History of Nepal Bhasa Literature] (in Newari). Lalitpur, Nepal: Nepal Bhasa Academy. ISBN 99933560-0-X.
- Vaidya, Dr. Janak Lal (1995). nepalbhasaya sahitya dha (in Newari). Kathmandu: Kheluita.
- Vaidya, Dr. Janak Lal (2002). nepalbhasaya prachin kavya srijana [Poetry Composition in Nepal Bhasa] (in Newari). Kathmandu: Nepal Academy. ISBN 99933-50-32-X.

=== Journal articles ===
- Clark, T. W. (December 1969). "Nepali and Pahari". Current Trends in Linguistics. The Hague: Mouton.
- Des Chene, Mary; Gautam, Bhaskar (December 1999). "Nepali and Nepal Bhasa Literature in English Translation: A Reference Bibliography" (PDF). Studies in Nepali History and Society. 4 (2): 383–430.
- Hutt, Michael (December 1986). "Diversity and Change in the Languages of Highland Nepal" (PDF). Contributions to Nepalese Studies. 14 (1). Centre for Nepal and Asian Studies, Tribhuvan University.
- Kalapura, Jose (2008). "Nepal Inscribed: Christian Missionaries in Nepal in the 18th century". Proceedings of the Indian History Congress. 69. ISSN 2249-1937. JSTOR 44147251.
- Kansakar, Tej R. (July 1993). "The Tibeto-Burman Languages of Nepal – A General Survey" (PDF). Contributions to Nepalese Studies. 20 (2). Center for Nepal and Asian Studies, Tribhuvan University.
- Kloppenborg, Ria. "Theravada Buddhism in Nepal" (PDF). Kailash.
- Malla, Kamal P. "The Earliest Dated Document in Newari: The Palmleaf from Uku Bahah NS 234/AD 1114" (PDF). Kailash. Archived from the original (PDF) on 8 January 2016.
- Shrestha, Bal Gopal (January 1999). "The Newars: The Indigenous Population of the Kathmandu Valley in the Modern State of Nepal" (PDF). Contributions to Nepalese Studies. Archived from the original (PDF) on 21 September 2013.
- Tamot, Kashinath (2013). Darnal, Prakash (ed.). "Jagajjyoti Mallako Svarodaya Khoji". Abhilekh (31). Rastriya Abhilekhalaya.
- Tewari, Ramesh Chandra (1983). "Socio-Cultural Aspects of Theravada Buddhism in Nepal". The Journal of the International Association of Buddhist Studies.
- van den Hoek, Bert; Shrestha, Balgopal (January 1995). "Education in the Mother Tongue: The Case of Nepal Bhasa (Newari)" (PDF). Contributions to Nepalese Studies. Archived from the original (PDF) on 22 March 2011.

"Sampada Visheshanka". Nepal. 48 (2). 2017.

=== Online sources ===
- Bajracharya, Hem Bajra (December 1975). "Jhee". Jhee.
- Maharjan, Basanta (2008). "Linguistic Movement of 2022 BS: A Case Study of the Newars in Kathmandu Valley".
- Sada, Ivan (December 2005). "Interview: Satya Mohan Joshi". ECS Nepal.
- Shakya, Ravi (February 2015). "Gian Guaberto Da Massa Dvara Sankalit Nepalbhasha Shabdakosh". Matina. Vol. 8, no. 19.
- Singh, Phatte Bahadur (September 1979). "Nepali Biharya Aitihasik Pristabhumi ("Historical Background of Nepali Bihar")". Jaa. Nepal Bhasa Sahitya Pala, Tri-Chandra Campus.
- "Ganki Basundhara Award given away". The Kathmandu Post. Nepalnews.com. 16 January 2003. Archived from the original on 3 August 2004.
- "History of Nepali Journalism". Nepal Press Institute. 15 February 2010.
- "The South Asian Literary Recording Project". Library of Congress New Delhi Office. 6 October 2010.
- "Ven. Bhikkhu Aniruddha: Patriarch of Nepal". Lumbini Nepalese Buddha Dharma Society (UK). 2008. Archived from the original on 27 September 2013.
