= Siegfried Lienhard =

Siegfried Lienhard (29 August 1924, in Sankt Veit an der Glan – 6 March 2011) was a professor of Indology at Stockholm University and a scholar of Sanskrit and the Newar language.

He published on the history of poetry in South Asia, as well as a catalogue of the Newar manuscripts held in the State Library of Berlin, a collection of Newar folk songs, and textual studies of classical Newar texts. In 1995 his students and colleagues published a Festschrift in his honour. In 2007 Oskar von Hinueber edited the collected minor writings of Siegfried Lienhard.

== Bibliography ==
=== Books ===
- (1963). Maṇicūḍāvadānoddhṛta: a Buddhist re-birth story in the Nevārī language. Stockholm: Almqvist & Wiksell.
- (1974). Nevārīgītīmañjarī: religious and secular poetry of the Nevars of the Kathmandu Valley. Stockholm : Almqvist & Wiksell international.
- (1980). Die Legende vom Prinzen Viśvantara. Eine nepalesische Bilderrolle aus der Sammlung des Museums for Indische Kunst Berlin. Berlin. Veröffentlichungen des Museums für Indische Kunst Berlin, 5.
- (1984). Songs of Nepal: an anthology of Nevar folksongs and hymns. Honolulu: University of Hawaii Press.
- (1984) A History of Classical Poetry: Sanskrit, Pali, Prakrit. Otto Harrassowitz Verlag.
- (1988). Nepalese manuscripts. part 1, Nevari and Sanskrit, Staatsbibliothek Preussischer Kulturbesitz, Berlin. Stuttgart: Franz Steiner.
- (1999). Diamantmeister und Hausvater : Buddhistisches Gemeindeleben in Nepal. Wien: Verlag der Osterreichischen Akademie der Wissenschaften.

=== Articles ===
- (2007). Kleine Schriften / Siegfried Lienhard. Oskar von Hinüber, ed. Wiesbaden: Harrassowitz, 2007.

== Festschrift ==
- Sauhṛdyamaṅgalam : studies in honour of Siegfried Lienhard on his 70th birthday. Mirja Juntunen et al. eds. Stockholm: Association of Oriental Studies, 1995.
