= Naresha Malla =

- Raja of Bhaktapur
- Reign: 1637 – 1644 CE.
- Predecessor: Jagajjyoti Malla
- Successor: Jagat Prakasha Malla
- Born: Nepal
- Died: 8 September 1643; Bhaktapur, Nepal
- Dynasty: Malla

Naresha Malla (Newar: 𑐣𑐬𑐾𑐱 𑐩𑐮𑑂𑐮) (died 1644), often referred to as Naresh or Narindra, was a Malla dynasty king of Bhaktapur, Nepal from 1637 until his death in 8 September 1643. He was succeeded by his son Jagat Prakasha Malla.
