= Jitamitra Malla =

Malla Dynasty King of Bhaktapur

- Sumati
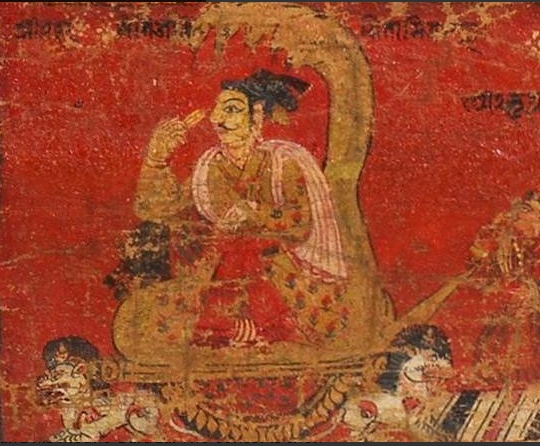
- Miniature of Jitamitra Malla on his throne, c. 1681

King of Bhaktapur
- Reign: 28 November 1672 — 21 September 1696
- Coronation: 28 November 1672
- Predecessor: Jagat Prakasha Malla
- Successor: Bhupatindra Malla
- Born: Unknown date Bhaktapur Durbar Square, Kingdom of Bhaktapur (Present day Bhaktapur, Nepal)
- Died: 14 November 1708; Bhaktapur, Nepal
- Spouse: Lalamati
- Issue: Bhupatindra Malla; Bhānumati Devi
Names
- Jayajitamitra Malla
Regnal name
- Sri Sri Sumati Jayajitamitra Malla Deva
- Dynasty: Malla
- Father: Sri Jaya Jagatprakasa Malla
- Mother: Padmāvati Devi

Jitamitra Malla (Newar: 𑐖𑐶𑐟𑐵𑐩𑐶𑐟𑑂𑐬 𑐩𑐮𑑂𑐮) was a Malla Dynasty King of Bhaktapur, Nepal from 1673 till his abdication in 1696. He was also known by his nom de plume, Sumati, meaning "the wise one".

He left his throne in 1696 to his eldest son Bhupatindra Malla to spend the rest of his life in religious activities, and died on 14 November 1708.

== Construction efforts ==
A son of Sri Jaya Jagatprakasa Malla Raja, Jitamitra was noted for his construction projects. In 1674 he built a Shikara-style Shiva temple with a gilded repousse mask of the God on each side in Bhaktapur. In 1682 he built near the Durbar the two-storied Dharmasala Palace with a golden Mahadeva. The palace was used by royalty until 1769 and today is a museum and part of the World Heritage Site on Durbar Square. To the east of this, he erected the temple and statue of Narayana, along with the temples of Dattatrikasa and Pashupati. An inscription in 1678 states that he built the royal palace Thanathu Dubar and its gardens and courtyard. Jitamitra was also credited with restoring Kumari Chowk, the images of Astamatrikas and, in 1690, donated two large cooper kettledrums (nagara) or bells to his favourite deity, the goddess Taleju for the gilded roof of Taleju. He also contributed a finely carved wooden tympanum above the main entrance to the Mul Chowk and also erected many memorials in Bhaktapur.

His son, Bhupatindra Malla who succeed him in 1696 was equally fascinated with architecture, and continued the development of the Dharmsala Palace, its 55 windows and gardens.

== Death ==
Although historians initially believed that Jitamitra Malla died around the time of the coronation of his son. However, in 1967 Historian Gautama Vajracharya published a previously undiscovered manuscript, where his death date is given as the thirteen day of the waxing moon of Margasira in NS 829 which falls on 14 November 1708 on the Gregorian calendar. The same document mentions that no women were burned as Sati during the funeral.

Sometime after his death, his wife Lalamati consecrated two sets of gilded repoussé statuettes of her and Jitamitra Malla, among which one set is part of a gilded repoussé strut in the former royal palace and the other set is displayed at the palace during the festival of Mohani, on the day of Vijayadashami.

== Gallery ==
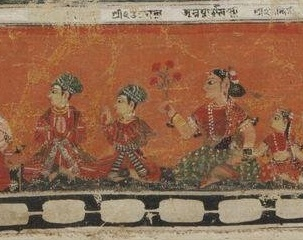
Miniature of Jitamitra Malla (left) from a Paubha dated 1670; sitting behind him are his brother Ugra Malla, his stepmother Annapurna and his half-sister Nandini.

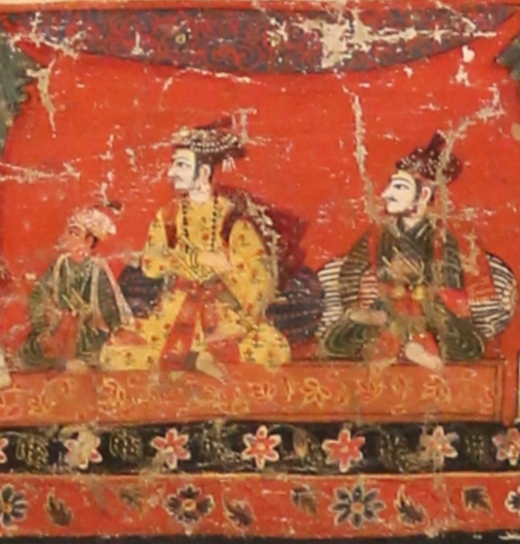
Miniature of Jitamitra alongside his brother Ugra Malla (right) and his son Bhupatindra Malla, dated 1686.

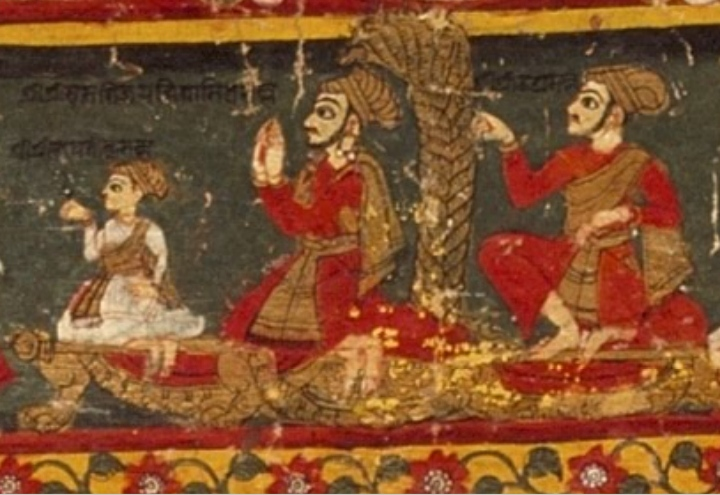
Jitamitra Malla with his brother Ugra Malla (right) and his son Bhupatindra Malla. minitaure from a Paubha dated 1681.

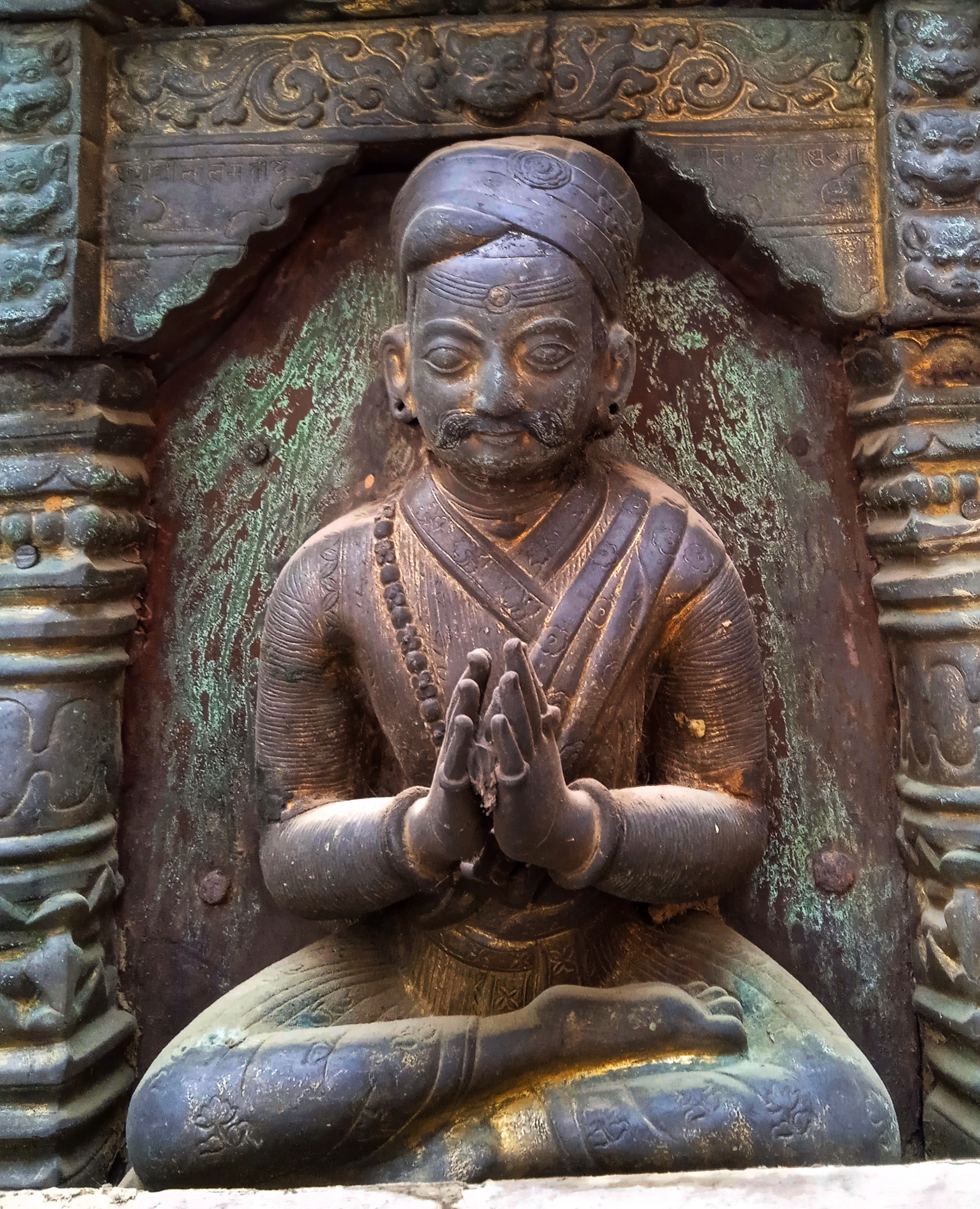
Posthumous gilded sculpture of Jitamitra Malla consecrated by his wife, Lālamati.

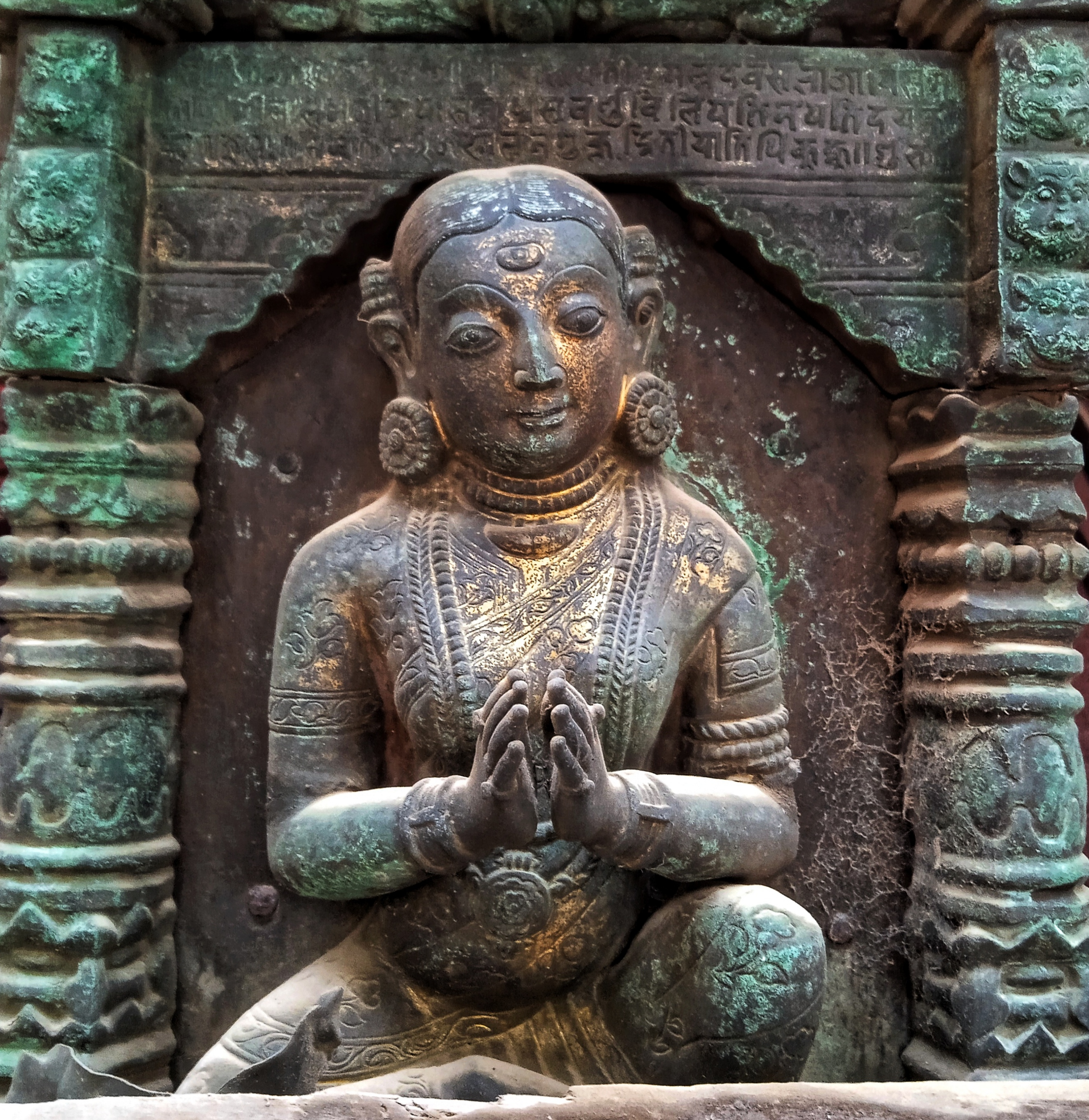
Sculpture of his wife Lālamati.

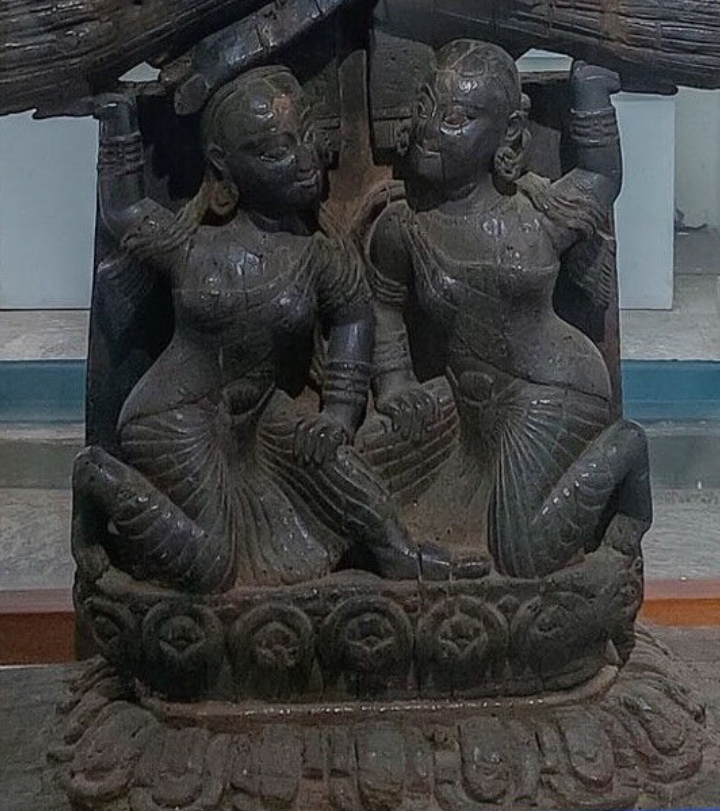
Wooden figurines depicting Jitamitra Malla's mother Padmavati and his step-mother Chandravati, c. 1670.

== Literary works ==
Jitamitra Malla is known to have composed eight poems in the Newar language. Among those poems, only two have been published. He is also known to have composed ten dramas in the Maithili language although none of these have been published. Jitamitra Malla wrote two Newar plays, which are:

- Mahābhārata Nāṭaka (1676)
- Jaiminibhārata Nāṭaka (1689)
