= Nepal Bhasa Academy =

Nepal Bhasa Academy is a Nepal Bhasa organisation. It promotes Nepal Bhasa and aims to develop the language. However, at present it records and makes a systematic study of the culture of the Newars before it is too late as it seems inevitable most of it is given up, forgotten and lost because of changes due to modernization, rapid improvement in information technology, transportation and communication systems and the impact mixed and imported culture.

== History ==
On 18 January 1992, Nepal Bhasa Academy organized a symposium of distinguished scholars, intellectuals, writers, artists and social workers of the Newar community to discuss a long-felt need for an authoritative academic institution to work systematically for the preservation and promotion of the Nepal Bhasa and cultural heritage of the Newars.

On 5 September 1992 the constitution of the Nepal Bhasa Academy was formally approved and an Academic Council with a maximum number of 75 members was formed. Then Nepal Bhasa Academy was established as a self-governing corporate body.

== Projects ==
The projects of Nepal Bhasa Academy are:-

- Construction work of Nepal Bhasa schools
- Creating Nepal Bhasa books
- Providing scholarship to people
- Danyahira Sirpa, an award of fifty thousand rupees for outstanding contributions to the field of Newari literature or music.
