= Shree Swasthani Brata Katha =

1573 Hindu epic by Jayanta Dev

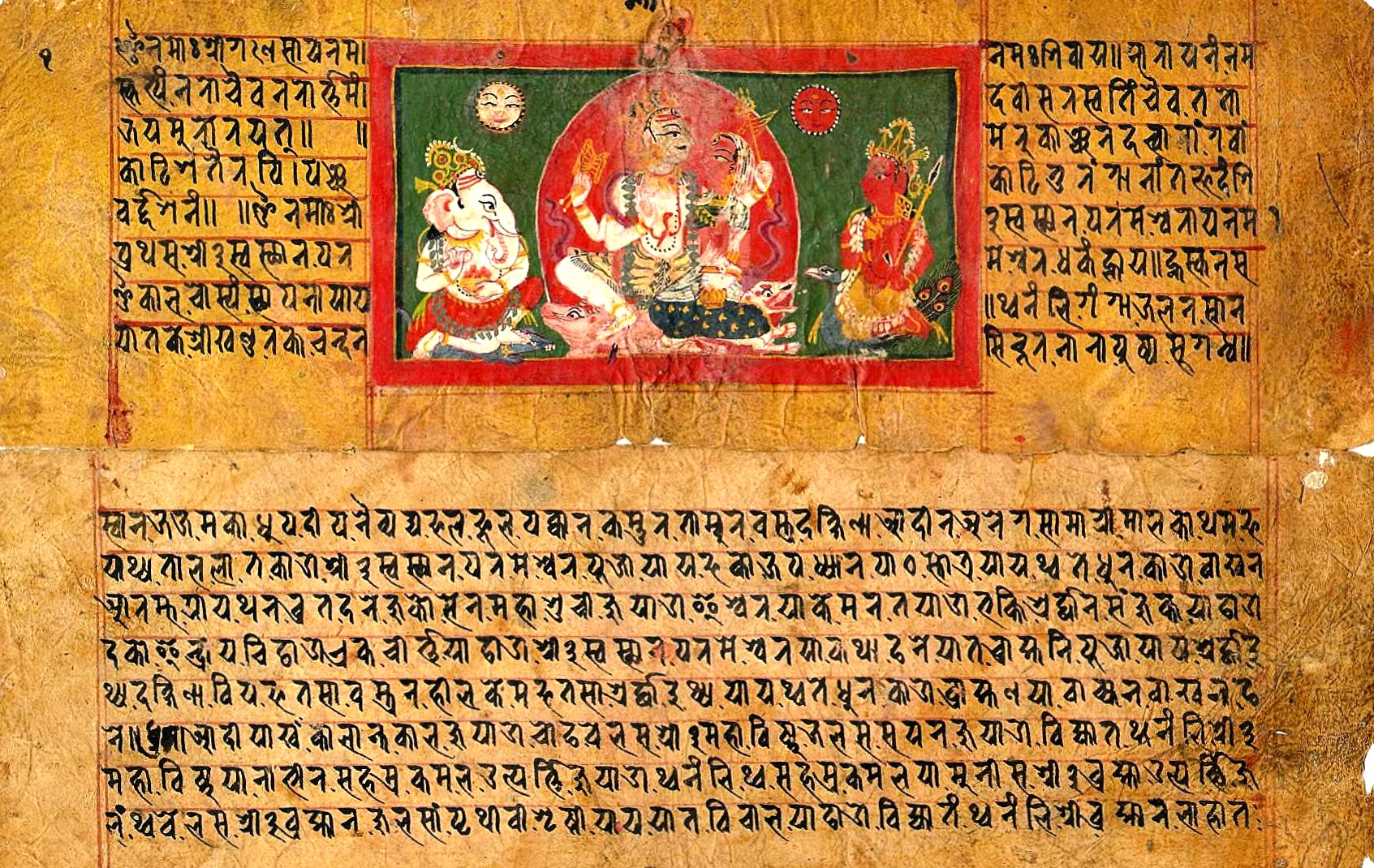
A 1819 CE manuscript of Swasthani Bakhan written in Newar language.

Shree Swasthani Bakhan (Newar: श्री स्वस्थानी बाखं, lit. 'Story of the Goddess Swasthani') is a Hindu epic originating from Nepal.

== History ==
It was first written around 1573 by Jayanta Dev in Newari and later from the early 19th century gained widespread popularity in the country following its translation into Nepali. Shree Swasthani Bakhan takes place in various areas in Nepal, including Sankhu.
