= Sitala Maju =

Traditional Nepalese song

Location in Nepal

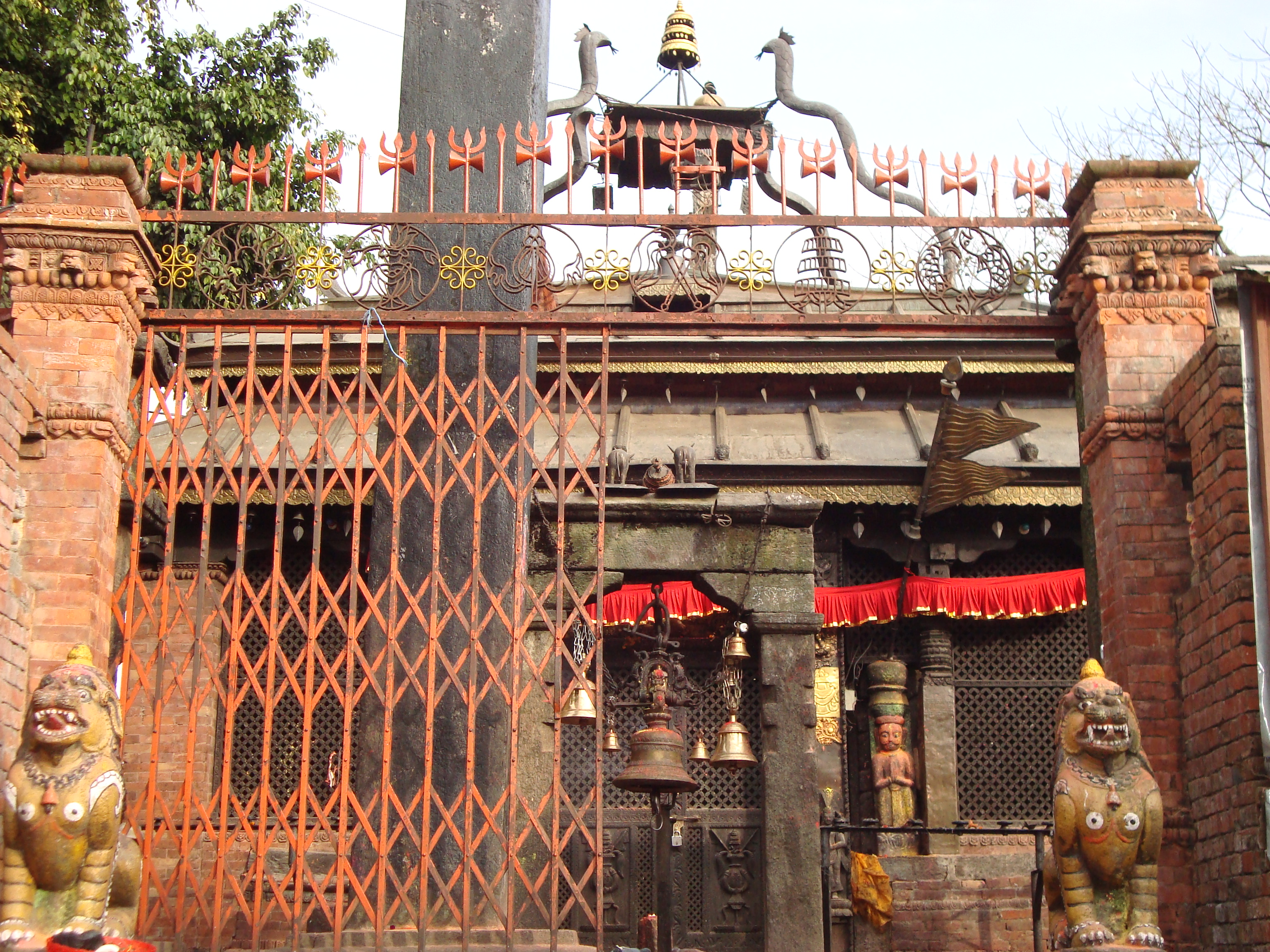
Dolakha Bhimsen Temple

"Sitalā Māju" (Nepal Bhasa: 𑐳𑐶𑐟𑐮𑐵 𑐩𑐵𑐖𑐸) is a traditional Nepalese song based on an historical event, and recounts the expulsion of children from the Kathmandu Valley by the then king Rana Bahadur Shah, who feared they would spread smallpox. Written by an anonymous composer, the lament in Nepal Bhasa dates from the early 19th century.

== Synopsis ==
The song describes how the king ordered the children and their parents to be rounded up and driven to eastern Nepal and across the Tama Koshi River (तामाकोशी). They suffered great hardships on the journey as they had no food, clothes or place to stay. The soldiers drove them forward by beating them with stinging nettles. Children died of cold and they were not allowed to be cremated or buried. So the parents had to throw the dead bodies into the Tama Koshi River.

The deportees were driven from Kathmandu to Bhaktapur, Banepa, Palanchok, Dolaghat, Dolakha and across the Tama Koshi. They were ordered to leave Nepal Mandala (Nepal Proper), whose eastern boundary is marked by the temple of Bhimsen in Dolakha. Many Newar settlements in the towns outside the Kathmandu Valley can be traced to this forced relocation.

The song's lilting tune and heart-rending words have made it an enduring classic. Sitalā Māju is one of the most well-known songs in Newar society. It is one of the six seasonal songs and is sung in the winter (December-January).

== Background ==
Children in the Kathmandu Valley were banished at the order of King Rana Bahadur Shah (reigned 1777-1805) to protect his infant son Girvan Yuddha Bikram Shah Deva (reigned 1799-1816) from catching smallpox. According to another version, the king was afraid that his wife would be infected, and so he had all the children in the valley sent away. Nevertheless, both Girvan Yuddha and the queen died of the disease. Rana Bahadur was so enraged at the deities for not saving his wife despite his prayers that he had the image of Harati (alternative name: Ajima Dyah) (अजिमा द्य:) at Swayambhu desecrated.

The epic poem's title Sitalā Māju refers to the name of the goddess of smallpox according to Hindu and Buddhist traditions.

== Lyrics ==
सितला माजु स्वहुने परजाया गथिन हवाल

न्यना मदु खना मदु कचि मचा तय मदु, महाराजया हुकुम जुल
नायखिन बाजन थायका, सिपाहीन घेरे याका, कचिमचा पितिनाव छोत

नसा बजि ब्यकुंच्यासे, कचिमचा लुकुंछिसे, वनेमाल तामा खुसि पारि
छम्ह मचा लुकुंछिसे, छम्ह मचा ब्यकुंच्यासे, छम्ह मचा लुतुलुसे यने

यें देसं दना वना खोप देसे बास जुल, तलेजु माजु दरसन याये
खोप देसं दना वना बनेपास बास जुल, चन्देस्वरी दरसन याये

बनेपानं दना वना पलांचोस बास जुल, भगवति दरसन याये
पलांचोकं दना वना दोलाघाते बास जुल, भिमसेन दरसन याये

दोलाघातं दना वना तामाखुसि बास जुल, वने मानि तामाखुसि पारि
दोलखा देसं दना वना तामाखुसि पारि थ्यन, महादेव दरसन याये

नय यात नसा मदु तिय यात वस मदु, च्वने यात बास जित मदु
लखि मखु पसि मखु न्हाकंप्वाच दाया हल, सिपाहीन घेरे यानाहल

कइ बीम्ह कछला माजु, लख जायकीम्ह सितला माजु, यनकीम्ह बछला माजुयाके फोने
थ्व हे मचा बचे जुसा जोलिंजोल बखुन बोयके, लुंयागु ओयागु द्वाफो स्वान छाय

सुरज कोमजो थाल चिकुं पुना मचा सित, माम बुबां नुग दाया खोल
सीम्ह मचा उयमदु मचा गाले थुनेमदु, परजाया गथिन हवाल

बाम्ह मचा माम जोंसे बाम्ह मचा बुबां जोंसे तामाखुसि कुतकाव छोत
स्वामि जुजुया धर्म मदया कचिमचा वाके छोत, वनेमाल तामाखुसि पारि

नेपालया छत्रपति श्री रणबहादुर, परजान अति दु:ख सिल
मते मते सितला माजु सहश्र बिनति छिके, याहुने लोक उधार.

== Translation ==
Look at the plight of the people, Mother Sitala.

It has never been heard of nor seen, but children cannot be kept in the country, The king has ordered it.
With drummers beating drums and soldiers surrounding them, The children were expelled.

Carrying pounded rice under their arms and their children on their backs, The people had to go across the Tama Koshi River.
They went away carrying one child on their back, one on their hips, And dragging another one behind them.

They departed from Kathmandu, spent the night at Bhaktapur, And visited the shrine of Mother Taleju.
They departed from Bhaktapur, spent the night at Banepa, And visited the shrine of Chandeshwari.

They departed from Banepa, spent the night at Palanchok, And visited the shrine of Bhagavati.
They departed from Palanchok, spent the night at Dolaghat, And visited the shrine of Bhimsen.

They departed from Dolaghat, spent the night at Tama Koshi, They had to go across the Tama Koshi River.
They departed from Dolakha, reached the other side of the Tama Koshi River, And visited the shrine of Mahadev.

There is no food to eat, there are no clothes to wear, And there is no place for me to stay.
It was not a whip, it was not a cane, they were beaten with stinging nettles, By soldiers who surrounded them and drove them forward.

We beg Mother Kachhala who gives smallpox blisters, Mother Sitala who fills them with water, Mother Bachhala who takes them away.
If this child lives, we will release a pair of pigeons, We will offer jasmine flowers of gold and silver.

At a place where no sunlight fell, the child died of cold, The mother and father beat their breasts and cried.
It is not allowed to cremate the dead child or to bury him, What great suffering of the people.

The father held half of the child's body, the mother held half of the child's body, And they threw it into the Tama Koshi River.
The king had no compassion and ordered the children to be expelled, They had to go across the Tama Koshi River.

King of Nepal, Rana Bahadur, The people suffered greatly.
Don't, don't, Mother Sitala, I beg you a thousand times, Please deliver the people.
