= Jagajjyoti Malla =

Jagajyoti Malla
- King of Bhaktapur
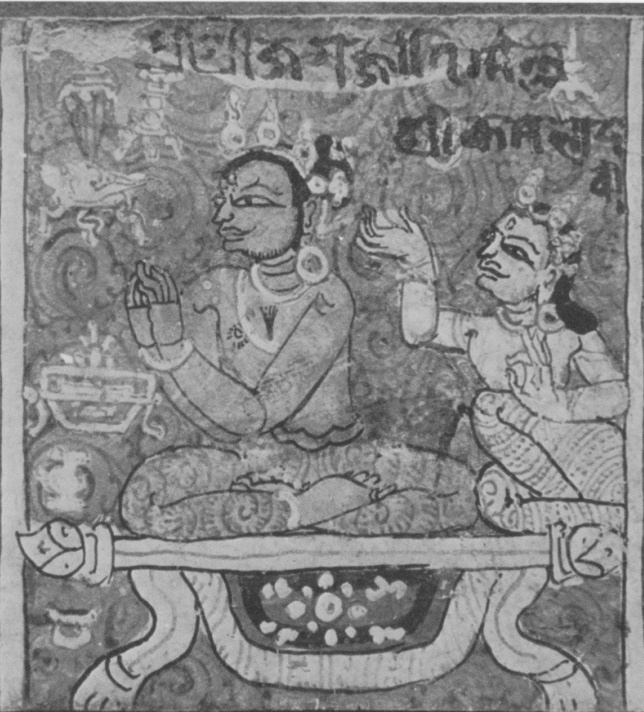
- Early 17th century depciction of Jagajjyoti Malla and his queen Kamala Devi.

King of Bhaktapur
- Reign: 1613–1637
- Predecessor: Trailokya Malla
- Successor: Naresha Malla
- Born: 1613; Bhaktapur, Nepal
- Died: 1637 (aged 23–24); Bhaktapur, Nepal
- Spouse: Kamala Devi
- Issue: Naresha Malla; Kirti Malla
- Dynasty: Malla
- Father: Trailokya Malla

Jagajyoti Malla (Newar: 𑐖𑐐𑐖𑑂𑐫𑑀𑐟𑐶 𑐩𑐮𑑂𑐮) was a Malla Dynasty King of Bhaktapur, Nepal from 1613 to 1637. Unlike many other Malla rulers, there is little evidence that this king was particularly active in construction developments in Nepal.

== Literary works ==
Jagajyoti Malla composed collection of 15 poems in the Newar language called Nānārtha pancadaśa. Similarly, he wrote a commentary on Natyashastra in the Newar language, which is known as Saṅgita Candra. He compiled a Sanskrit text called Nītisārasaṅgraha (collection of the essence of morality), along with a Newar translation to instruct his children. Jagajyoti Malla also wrote in the Maithili language and composed three Maithili plays.

- Muditakuvalayāśva-nātaka (1628)
- Haragaurīvivāha-nātaka (1629)
- Kuñjavihāra-nātaka (unknown date)

Other dramas have also been ascribed to him but copies have yet to be located.

== Gallery ==
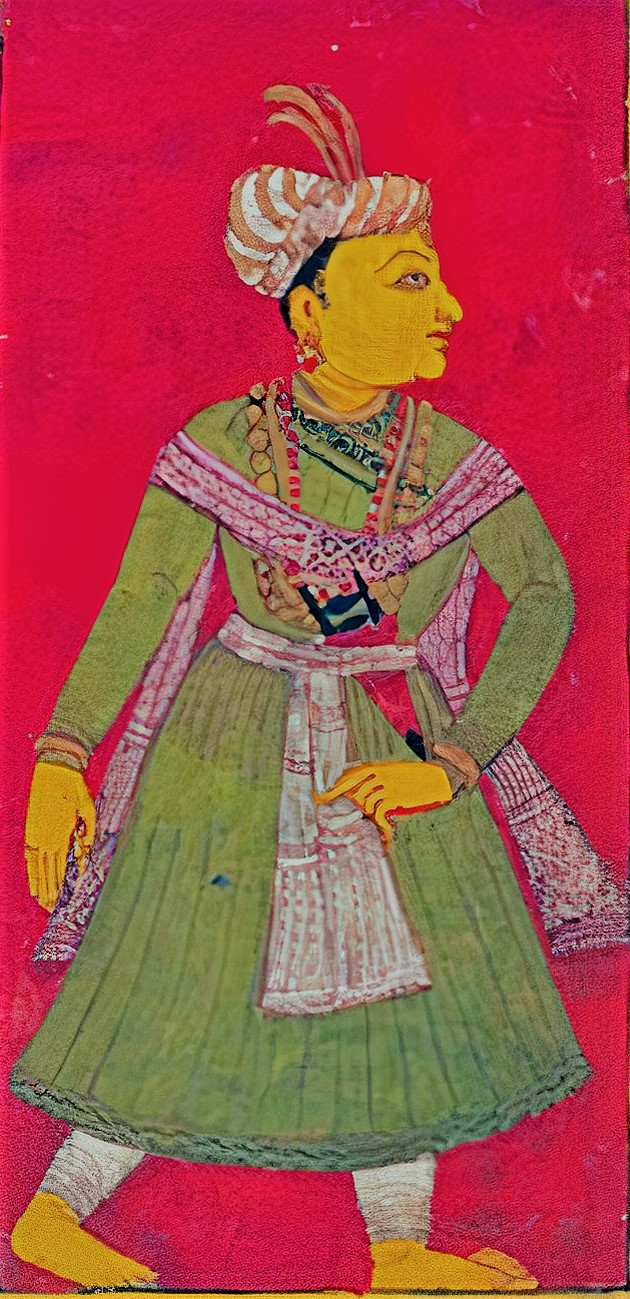
Jagajjyoti Malla, excerpt from a devtional song book c.17th century.

Jagajjyoti Malla's Newar commentary in Natyashastra.

Newar language inscription of Jagajjyoti Malla in the stone sculpture, 1631 CE

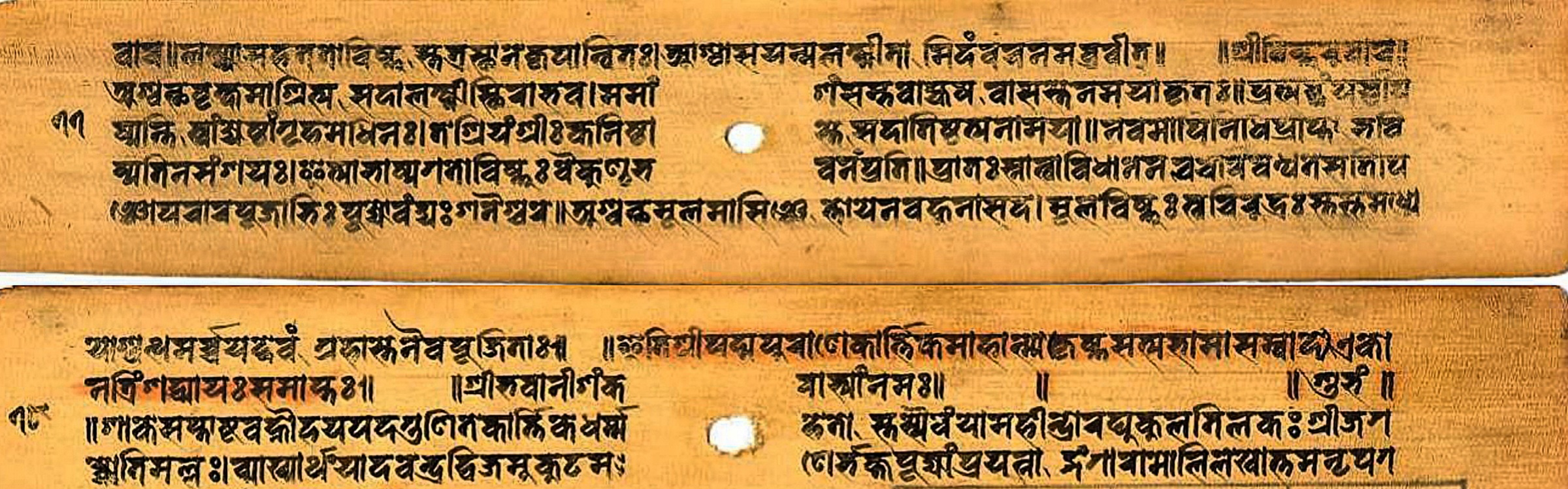
Palm-leaf manuscript of Kartika Mahatmya, Sanskrit language, Newar script, commissioned by Jagajjyoti Malla
