= Jagat Prakasha Malla =

King of Bhaktapur (r. 1643–1672)

- King of Bhaktapur
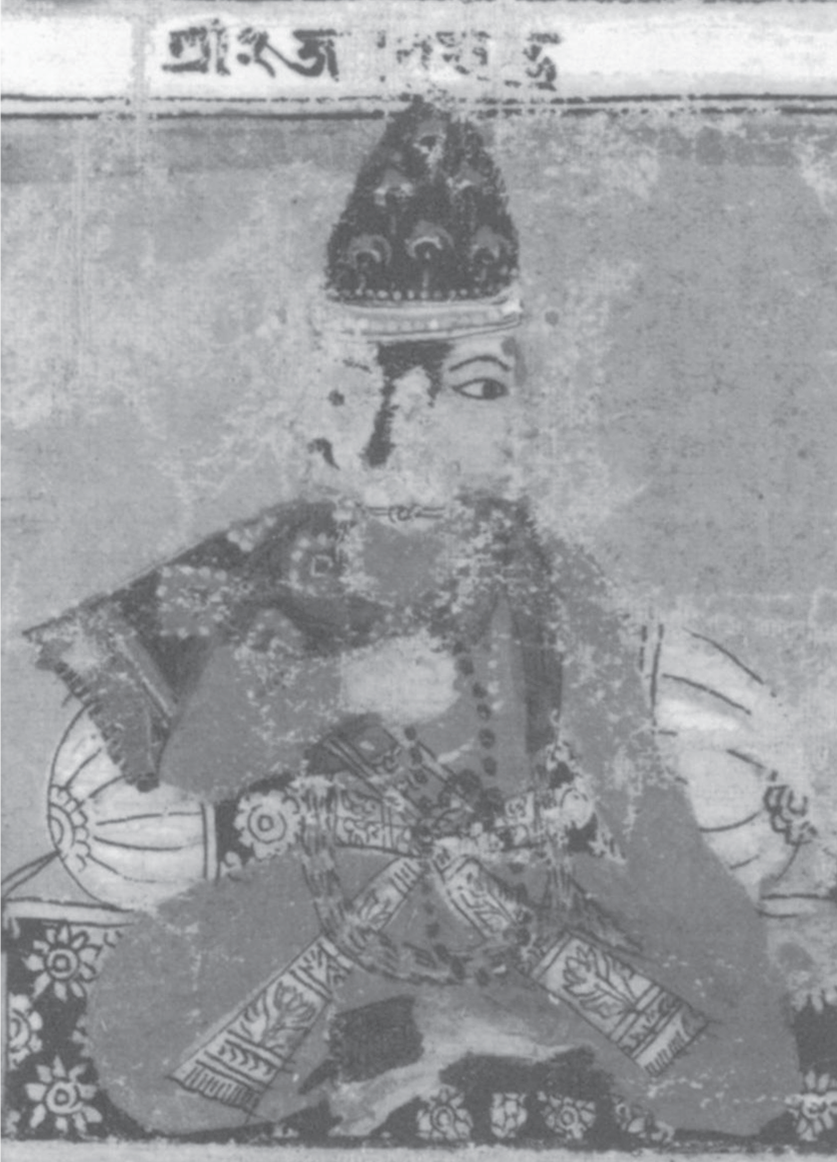
- A 1670 painting of Jagaccanda Malla.

King of Bhaktapur
- Reign: 8 September 1643 – 28 November 1672
- Coronation: 8 September 1643
- Predecessor: Naresha Malla
- Successor: Jitamitra Malla
- Regent: Annapurna Lakshmi; Kamala Devi
- Born: 5 December 1637; Bhaktapur, Kingdom of Bhaktapur, Nepal
- Died: 28 November 1672 (aged 34); Bhaktapur Durbar Square, Kingdom of Bhaktapur, Nepal
- Spouse: Padmavati; Chandravati; Annapurna
- Issue: Jitamitra Malla; Ugra Malla; Nandini; Gherawa
Regnal name
- Sri Jaya Jagat Prakasha Malla Deva
- Dynasty: Malla
- Father: Naresha Malla
- Mother: Kamala Devi

Jagat Prakasha Malla (Nepal Bhasa: 𑐖𑐐𑐟𑐥𑑂𑐬𑐎𑐵𑐱 𑐩𑐮𑑂𑐮) was a Malla Dynasty King of Bhaktapur, Nepal from 1642 to 1673. He succeeded his father Naresha Malla when he was just four years old and was under the regency of his aunt Annapurna Lakshmi and his mother Kamala Devi until his Diksha ceremony in 1654. He is also known as Jagaccanda (Nepal Bhasa: 𑐖𑐐𑐔𑑂𑐔𑐣𑑂𑐡), a syncretic name formed by combining his name with his minister Candrasekhar Simha, a name which he adopted this name following the death of Chandrasekhara in 1661 till his own death in 1672.

Throughout his life, he wrote plays and poems in both Nepal Bhasa and Maithili. His poetry book, Nepal Bhasaya gita ("songs in Nepal Bhasa") which contains 518 different poems, is considered by some experts to be one of the most important works in Nepal Bhasa.

He died of smallpox when he was 35 years old.

== Marriage and Children ==
As per his Maithili drama Prabhāvatīharana-nātaka and his son Jitamitra Malla's inscriptions, his first two wives were Padmavati and Chandravati, the former of whom was the queen consort and the mother to the heir. His third and favourite wife Annapurna was, according to Vaidya, a maiden from Panauti. But Dhaubhadel, based on one of his stone inscriptions which mentions Chandrasekhar performing the Kanyadana of Annapurna, theorizes that Annapurna was likely the sister of Chandrasekhara.

As depicted in a Paubha from 1670, Jagata Prakasha had four children, three sons and a daughter. His sons were:

- Jitamitra Malla (from Padmavati)
- Ugra Malla
- Gherawa

And his daughter was:

- Nandini (from Annapurna)

According to a contemporary expenditure book, Nandini's wedding ceremony took place at sadasiva chuka, a courtyard of the royal palace in 1674 (NS 795). While the expenditure book contains the details of the rituals performed and the expenditure incurred in the wedding ceremony, it doesn't mention the name of her groom.

== Literary works ==
Jagat Prakasha Malla is known to have written many dramas in the Newar language. Some of which are:

- śaśidevopākhyāna nāṭaka
- śrīkṛṣṇarukmaṇī pariṇaya
- śiva pārvatī pariṇaya
- mādhavānala kāma kandalā
- śrīkṛṣṇa caritra

Similarly, he also wrote ten dramas, of which two have been published in the Maithili language. These are:

- Prabhāvatīharana-nātaka (1656)
- Pradyumnavijaya-nātaka (unknown date of composition)

== Gallery ==
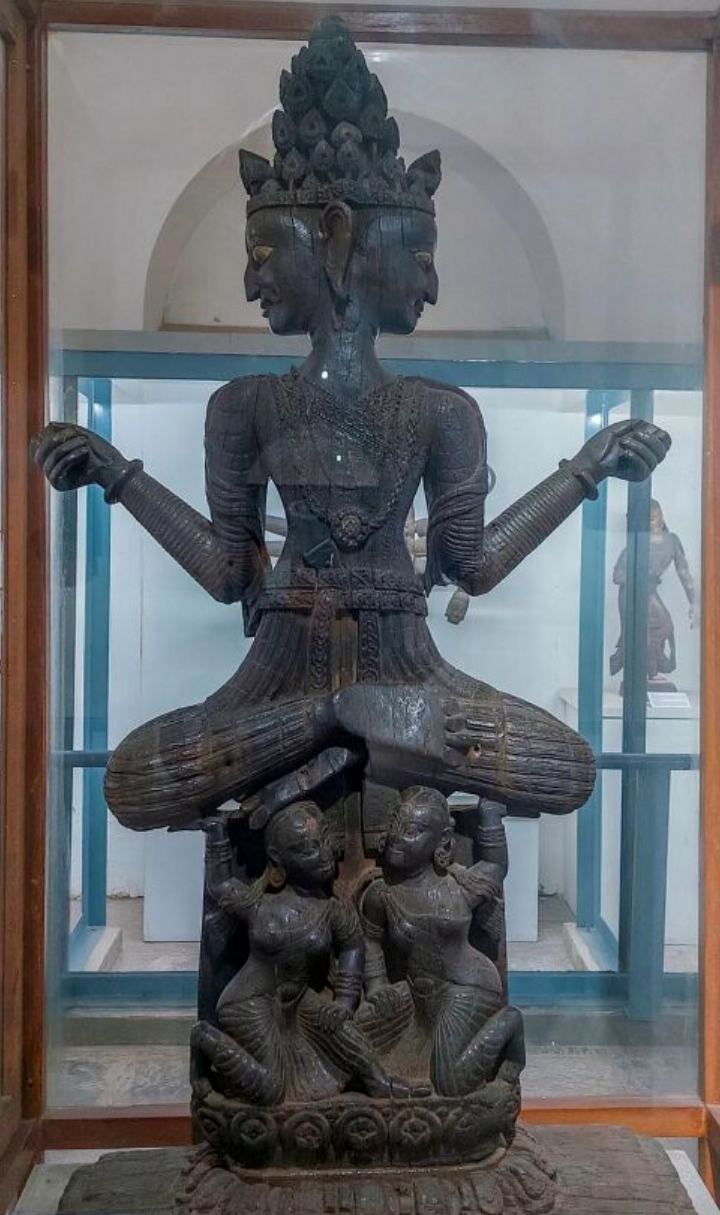
A wooden sculpture depicting Jaggacanda, the syncretic form of Jagata Praksha Malla and his favourite minister, Chandrasekhara Simha

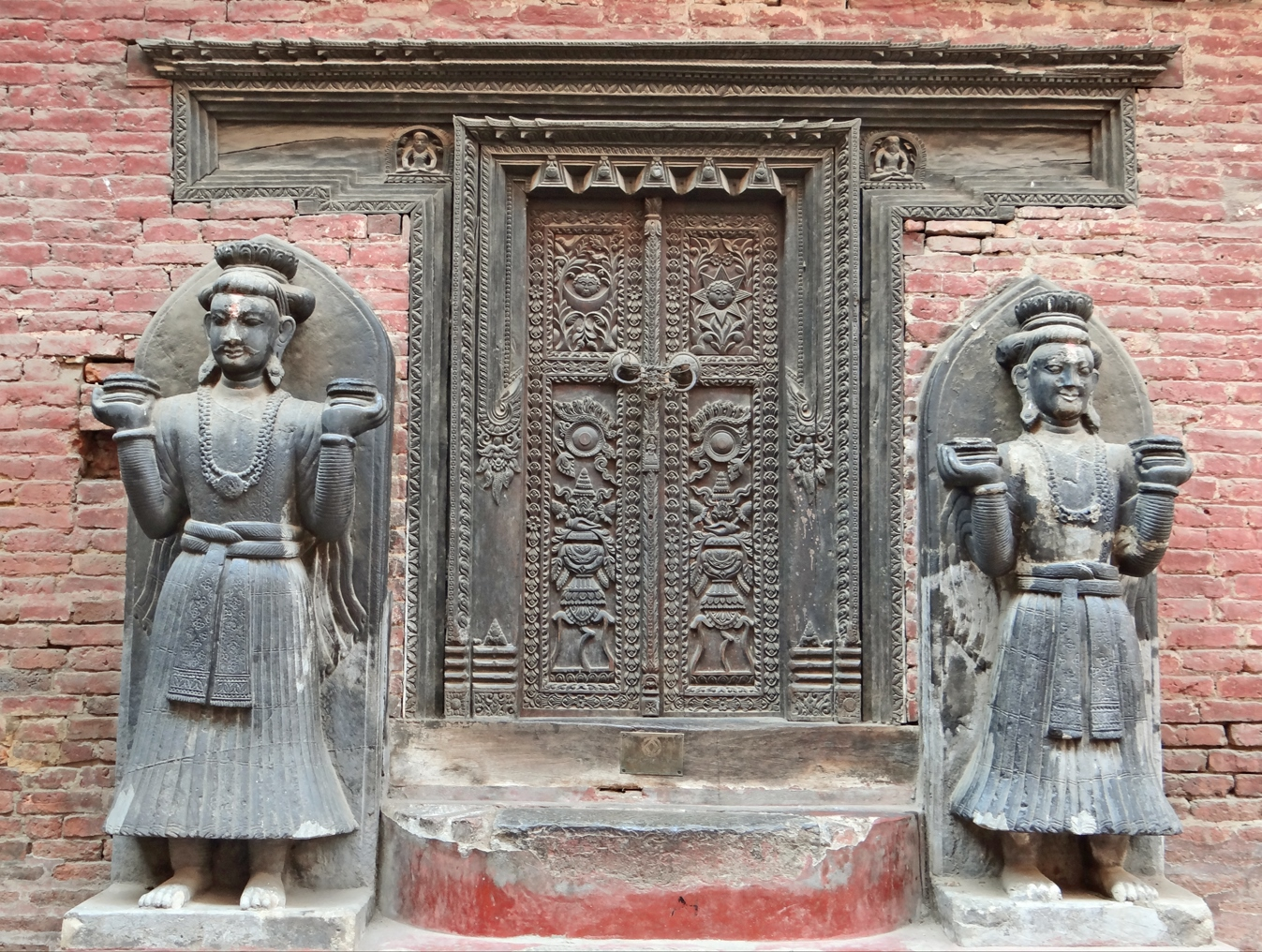
Sculpture of Jagata Prakasha Malla and his minister Chandrasekhara at the royal palace of Bhaktapur.

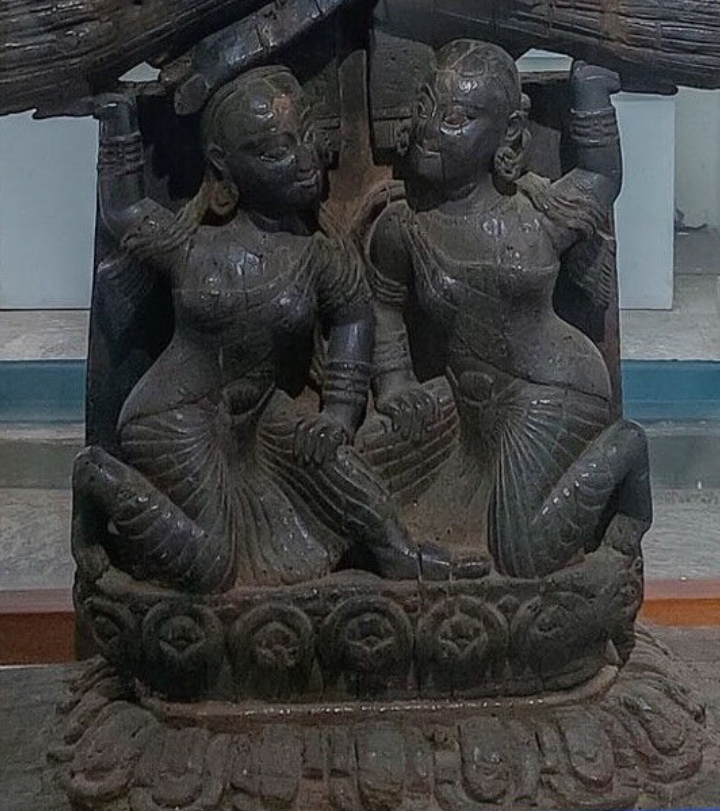
Wooden figurines of his wives, Padmavati and Chandravati.

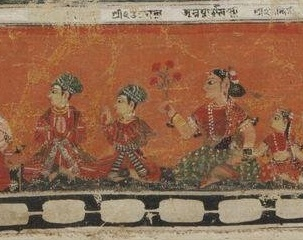
Paubha from 1670 depicting his family, (from left) his sons Jitamitra and Ugra Malla, his third wife, Annapurna and his daughter Nandini.
