= Miss Universe Nepal 2022 =

6th edition of the Miss Universe Nepal

- Date: August 25, 2022
- Hosts: Subeksha Khadka; Presca Udas; Alok Thapa
- Venue: Hotel Yak & Yeti, Kathmandu, Nepal
- Broadcaster: Image Channel
- Entrants: 61
- Placements: 20
- Winner: Sophiya Bhujel; Kathmandu
- Miss Brave Bold Beautiful: Shristi Tamang; Kathmandu

Miss Universe Nepal 2022 (MUN 2022) was organized by Umanga Creations, on 25 August 2022 at Hotel Yak & Yeti, Kathmandu. At the end of the event, Sujita Basnet crowned Sophiya Bhujel who represented Nepal at Miss Universe 2022.

Image Channel broadcast the pageant live on Television and official youtube channel.

== Background ==
=== Location and date ===
The beauty contest was scheduled to be held on 25 August 2022. The press conference of the contest was conducted at the Hyatt Regency Hotel in Kathmandu. For the first time, the organizers held workshops in different parts of Nepal. All the workshops were hosted by the managing director Uddhab Adhikari, Sujita Basnet, fashion stylist Sagar Gurung and catwalk trainer, Smith Tamang.

List of the main events in the pageant
Location	Date	Event	Venue	Ref.
Kathmandu (4 May – 7 May)	4 May	Registration Opening	Virtual	
Kathmandu (4 May – 7 May)	7 May	Press Conference	Hyatt Regency Hotel, Kathmandu	
Pokhara	10 June	Pokhara Workshop	Hotel Barahi, Lakeside, Pokhara	
Butwal	11 June	Butwal Workshop	Hotel da Flamingo, Butwal	
Chitwan	12 June	Chitwan Workshop	The Fern Residency, Bharatpur, Chitwan	
Kathmandu	20 June	BBB (Brave, Bold and Beautiful) Challenge	Virtual	
Nepalgunj	21 June	Nepalgunj Workshop	Hotel Central Plaza, Baijanath, Nepalgunj	
Surket	22 June	Surkhet Workshop	Suva Hotel, Birendranagar, Surkhet	
Final venue: Kathmandu (2 July – 25 August)	2 July	Registration Ending	Virtual	
Final venue: Kathmandu (2 July – 25 August)	8 July	Quarterfinalists Announcement	Virtual	
Final venue: Kathmandu (2 July – 25 August)	14 July	Top 40 Swimsuit Competition	Virtual	
Final venue: Kathmandu (2 July – 25 August)	20 July	Top 40 "Nepali Naari" Statement Competition	Virtual	
Final venue: Kathmandu (2 July – 25 August)	24 July	Top 40 Question & Answer Competition (First 20)	Virtual	
Final venue: Kathmandu (2 July – 25 August)	25 July	Top 40 Question & Answer Competition (Second 20)	Virtual	
Final venue: Kathmandu (2 July – 25 August)	2 August	Semifinalists Announcement	Virtual	
Final venue: Kathmandu (2 July – 25 August)	10 August	Top 20 Arrival	Kathmandu	
Final venue: Kathmandu (2 July – 25 August)	14 August	Top 20 Press Presentation	Hotel Yak & Yeti, Kathmandu	
Final venue: Kathmandu (2 July – 25 August)	14 August	Close Camp	Hotel Yak & Yeti, Kathmandu	
Final venue: Kathmandu (2 July – 25 August)	22 August	Preliminary Competition	Hotel Yak & Yeti, Kathmandu	
Final venue: Kathmandu (2 July – 25 August)	25 August	Grand Finale Coronation	Hotel Yak & Yeti, Kathmandu	

=== Hosts and Performer ===
Like the last two editions, Subeksha Khadka hosted this edition with another co-host Presca Udas.

=== Selection of Participants ===
Applications started on 4 May and applications ended on 2 July.

== Contestants ==
=== Top 40 Final Round Results ===
Code Number	Contestants	Age (Note: Ages at the time of the pageant)	Hometown	Placement	International Pageant
1044	Sophiya Bhujel §	27	Kathmandu	Miss Universe Nepal	Miss Universe 2022- Unplaced
1004	Bipana Adhikari	22	Sydney, Australia	1st Runner Up	Miss Intercontinental 2022- Unplaced
1061	Ashma KC	27	Adelaide, Australia	2nd Runner Up	
1045	Sefina Joshi	28	Kathmandu	3rd Runner Up	
1032	Monalisha Parajuli	25	(Nepal) Udayapur	4th Runner Up	
1005	Diksha Khati	21	(Nepal) Jhapa	Top 10	
1021	Jasmine Khadka	22	Kathmandu	Top 10	
1030	Anu Anmol Chhetri	20	(Nepal) Butwal	Top 10	
1033	Reeju Khadka	28	Sydney, Australia	Top 10	
1049	Rupsi Shrestha	26	(New York City) New York, USA	Top 10	
1010	Aakriti Manandhar	23	Kathmandu	Top 20	
1015	Samana Karki	18	Montreal, Canada	Top 20	
1016	Priyanshu Mahat	22	(Nepal) Chitwan	Top 20	
1018	Srishti Hada	23	Kathmandu	Top 20	
1025	Monika Chaudhary	28	(Nepal) Bardiya	Top 20	
1029	Shristi Tamang ★	24	Kathmandu	Top 20	
1048	Rajani Mishra	25	(Nepal) Nuwakot	Top 20	
1059	Prativa Maharjan	27	Australia	Top 20	
1039	Aayushnova Dhungana Chhetri	25	Kathmandu	Top 20	
1040	Renuka Chaudhary	20	(Nepal) Butwal	Top 20	
1001	Anuska Adhikari	21	(United States) USA	Top 40	
1006	Anuma Rai	18	(Nepal) Jhapa	Top 40	
1009	Sabina Chaudhary	26	(Nepal) Bhaktapur	Top 40	
1013	Surabhi Kanal	23	Virginia, USA	Top 40	
1019	Rebina Shrestha	26	(Nepal) Dhankuta	Top 40	
1023	Preshika RL Shah	27	(Nepal) Lalitpur	Top 40	
1027	Prapti Adhikari	23	(Nepal) Pokhara	Top 40	
1028	Swikriti Bhattarai	22	(Nepal) Itahari	Top 40	
1031	Sayara Gurung	20	(Nepal) Butwal	Top 40	
1034	Benija Karki	25	(Nepal) Jhapa	Top 40	
1035	Sameeka Sherchan	24	Japan	Top 40	
1036	Shrutee Uprety	22	(Nepal) Chitwan	Top 40	
1037	Shrie Basnet	24	(Nepal) Bhaktapur	Top 40	
1038	Sushana Shrestha	20	Kathmandu	Top 40	
1043	Safalta KC	18	Kathmandu	Top 40	
1046	Merina Shrestha	25	Kathmandu	Top 40	
1050	Anjali Shah	20	(Nepal) Janakpur	Top 40	
1053	Kanchan Gautam	28	Kathmandu	Top 40	
1062	Aanchal Khadka	24	Kathmandu	Top 40	
1065	Shraddha Adhikari	25	Kathmandu	Top 40	

Note-

(§): Winner of Social Impact Leader Award.

(★): The winner who won the BBB (Brave, Bold and Beautiful) Challenge is automatically a quarterfinalist for Miss Universe Nepal 2022.

=== Top 61 Preliminary ===
Code Number	Contestants	Age	Hometown	Placement
1002	Reetu Poudel	21	(Nepal) Chandragiri	Eliminated
1007	Khushi Shrestha	19	(Nepal) Simara	Eliminated
1008	Sambriddhi Regmi	25	TBA	Eliminated
1012	Priyanka Regmi	TBA	TBA	Eliminated
1014	Nilam Dhungana	21	(Nepal) Bardibas	Eliminated
1017	Anisha Pathak	19	(Nepal) Biratnagar	Eliminated
1020	Ronisha Phuyal	TBA	(Nepal) Hetauda	Eliminated
1022	Asha Balal	28	(Nepal) Gulmi	Eliminated
1024	Swastika Karki	21	(Kathmandu) Lazimpat	Eliminated
1041	Pooja Singh	24	(Nepal) Dhangadhi	Eliminated
1042	Suman Bayak	TBA	TBA	Eliminated
1047	Shabbu Maharjan	26	Kathmandu	Eliminated
1051	Punam Mahato	TBA	(Nepal) Boniya	Eliminated
1052	Maya Kandel	TBA	TBA	Eliminated
1054	Ashmita Gautam	TBA	TBA	Eliminated
1055	Sunita Khatri	TBA	(Nepal) Lalitpur	Eliminated
1056	Anusha Karki	TBA	TBA	Eliminated
1057	Shanaya Rauniyar	TBA	TBA	Eliminated
1060	Anjali Rauniyar	TBA	TBA	Eliminated
1063	Siwani Gupta	TBA	TBA	Eliminated
1064	Dravya Adhikari	TBA	TBA	Eliminated

== Previous Experience ==
- (#1) Anuska Adhikari was the 1st Runner Up of [Miss Nepal's SEE Icon 2017]
- (#2) Anuska Adhikari was a Top 18 semifinalist in Miss Universe Nepal 2021 but she later withdrawn.
- (#3) Diksha Khati was a Top 10 finalist and the winner of Miss Talent at an unnamed pageant in 2017.
- (#4) Diksha Khati competed in Miss Universe Nepal 2021 but she later withdrawn.
- (#5) Aakriti Manandhar was the 2nd Runner Up of Miss Nepal Peace Season 6 / 2019.
- (#6) Surabhi Kanal was the winner of Miss Nepal USA 2019.
- (#7) Surabhi Kanal competed in Miss Universe Nepal 2020.
- (#8) Surabhi Kanal competed in Miss Universe Nepal 2021 but she later withdrawn.
- (#9) Priyanshu Mahat competed in Miss Universe Nepal 2021.
- (#10) Jasmine Khadka was the winner of Miss Teen Nepal 2016.
- (#11) Shristi Tamang was the winner of Miss SLC Icon 2014.
- (#12) Monalisha Parajuli was the winner of Runway Model 2015.
- (#13) Aayushnova Dhungana Chhetri competed in Miss Nepal 2022.
- (#14) Renuka Chaudhary was the winner of Miss Empress Nepal 2021.
- (#15) Renuka Chaudhary was the 1st runner-up of Miss Empress International 2021 and she also won Miss Talent and Best in National Costume.
- (#16) Sophiya Bhujel was a Top 7 Finalist in Miss Nepal 2019.
- (#17) Sophiya Bhujel was a Top 10 Finalist in Global Asian Model 2019.
- (#18) Sophiya Bhujel was crowned as Nepal's representative for Miss Eco International 2022.
- (#19) Sophiya Bhujel was a Top 21 Semifinalist at Miss Eco International 2022.
- (#20) Rajani Mishra competed in Miss Universe Nepal 2020.
- (#21) Anusha Karki was the winner of NAAT Miss Airhostess International 2021.
- (#22) Ashma KC was a Top 10 Semifinalist in Miss Nepal 2016.
