= Miss Universe Nepal 2021 =

5th Edition of Miss Universe Nepal

- Date: October 30, 2021
- Hosts: Presca Udas; Subeksha Khadka
- Venue: Hotel Yak & Yeti, Kathmandu, Nepal
- Broadcaster: Image Channel
- Director: Uddhab Adhikari
- Entrants: 50 (later 44)
- Placements: 18
- Winner: Sujita Basnet; Maryland, United States
- Social Impact Leader: Rakchya Upreti; Kathmandu

Miss Universe Nepal 2021(MUN 2021), was organized by Umanga Creations, on 30 October 2021 at Hotel Yak & Yeti in Kathmandu. Anshika Sharma crowned Sujita Basnet to represent Nepal in Miss Universe 2021.

The winner received NPR Rs. 1,000,000 as prize for winning the title as well as full support from the organizer Umanga Creation Pvt. Ltd. for her BBB (Brave, Bold and Beautiful) Social Advocacy.

Image Channel broadcast the pageant live on television and its youtube channel.

== Background ==
=== Location and date ===
The beauty contest was scheduled to be held on 30 October 2021. The press conference of the contest was conducted at the Yak & Yeti Hotel in Kathmandu, that would serve as the venue for the close camp and the grand finale coronation.

List of the main events in the pageant
Location	Date	Event	Venue	Ref.
Final venue: Kathmandu (22 September – 30 October)	22 September	Registration Opening	Virtual	
Final venue: Kathmandu (22 September – 30 October)	30 September	Registration Ending	Virtual	
Final venue: Kathmandu (22 September – 30 October)	1 October	Top 50 Announcement	Virtual	
Final venue: Kathmandu (22 September – 30 October)	3 October	Top 50 Swimsuit Competition	Virtual	
Final venue: Kathmandu (22 September – 30 October)	4 October	Top 50 Judges' Interview Competition	Virtual	
Final venue: Kathmandu (22 September – 30 October)	10 October	Top 18 Announcement	Virtual	
Final venue: Kathmandu (22 September – 30 October)	20 October	Close Camp Beginning	Hotel Yak & Yeti, Kathmandu	
Final venue: Kathmandu (22 September – 30 October)	22 October	Grand Final Press Presentation	Hotel Yak & Yeti, Kathmandu	
Final venue: Kathmandu (22 September – 30 October)	28 October	Grand Final Press Announcement	Hotel Yak & Yeti, Kathmandu	
Final venue: Kathmandu (22 September – 30 October)	28 October	Preliminary Interview Competition	Hotel Yak & Yeti, Kathmandu	
Final venue: Kathmandu (22 September – 30 October)	28 October	Crown Reveal	Hotel Yak & Yeti, Kathmandu	
Final venue: Kathmandu (22 September – 30 October)	29 October	Close Camp Ending	Hotel Yak & Yeti, Kathmandu	
Final venue: Kathmandu (22 September – 30 October)	30 October	Grand Final Coronation	Hotel Yak & Yeti, Kathmandu	

=== Hosts and Performer ===
Like the 2020 edition, Subeksha Khadka (Miss Nepal International 2012 and World Miss University Nepal 2017) hosted everything from the Grand Final Press Presentation. As for the final however, instead of Rabi Rajkarnikar, Presca Udas hosted the event with Subeksha Khadka.

Sushant KC was the performer for the Evening Gown round.

=== Selection of Participants ===
Applications started on 22 September and applications ended on 30 September. The official press presentation for the pageant was on 10 October 2021.

=== 'The Mystical Crown' ===
A new crown wad used to award the winner of the pageant for the 2021 edition. The headwear is known as "The Mystical Crown" and was crafted by Shree Balaji Diamond.

The crown was inspired from Newari architecture with inspirations from places of worship for Lord Bhairava and Gautama Buddha. The crown includes more than 3200 pieces of diamonds with an approximate weight of 312 carats, topped off with a playful dangling of south sea cultured pearls and kyanite stones which are locally mined and cut in Nepal.

== Results ==
Color keys

- The contestant Won in an International pageant.
- The contestant was a Runner-up in an International pageant.
- The contestant was a Semi-Finalist in an International pageant.
- The contestant assumed another title.
- The contestant was not able to compete in an International pageant.
- The contestant did not place but won a Special Award in the pageant.
- The contestant did not place.

Final results	Contestant	International pageant	International Results
Miss Universe Nepal 2021	Maryland, United States - Sujita Basnet	Miss Universe 2021	Unplaced
1st runner-up	Moscow, Russia - Nina Kant Mandal		
2nd runner-up	Kathmandu - Rakchya Upreti (฿)		
3rd runner-up	(Nepal) Rolpa - Pratikshya Mahara Chhetri		
4th runner-up	(Nepal) Lalitpur - Keshu Khadka	Miss Supranational 2022	Unplaced; Supra Chat Winner - Group 7 (Judges' Vote)
Top 10	(Nepal) Chitwan – Sagun Gurung (●)		
Top 10	(Nepal) Jhapa – Bibhuti Gautam (●)		
Top 10	Kathmandu – Arya Nishaant		
Top 10	Kathmandu – Bristi Acharya		
Top 10	(Nepal) Ramechhap – Mandira Karki		
Top 18	(Nepal) Bardiya – Pritima Panthi		
Top 18	Canada – Swikriti Khadka	Later withdrawn / did not compete	
Top 18	(Nepal) Chitwan – Anisha Poudel		
Top 18	Czech Republic – Smarika Karki		
Top 18	(Nepal) Gorkha – Smita Neupane		
Top 18	(Nepal) Jhapa – Sadiksha Khadka		
Top 18	Kathmandu – Sagarika Malla		
Top 18	(United States) USA – Anuska Adhikari	Later withdrawn / did not compete	

(●): The candidates won the Miss Popular Choice Award (online voting) and got direct entry into Top 10 Finalists.
(฿): The candidate won the Social Impact Leader Award (Best BBB (Brave, Bold and Beautiful) Social Advocacy) and got direct entry into Top 10 Finalists.

=== Special awards ===
Award	Contestant
Miss Fabulous	Maryland, United States - Sujita Basnet
Miss Fierce	Maryland, United States - Sujita Basnet
Miss Lifestyle	Moscow, Russia - Nina Kant Mandal
Social Impact Leader	Kathmandu - Rakchya Upreti
Miss Fear and Fearless	Moscow, Russia - Nina Kant Mandal
Miss Popular Choice	(Nepal) Chitwan - Sagun Gurung; (Nepal) Jhapa - Bibhuti Gautam

==== Miss Popular Choice ====
The winner of the "Miss Popular Choice" was determined via a public paid voting on the IME Pay app. Both Sagun Gurung from Chitwan and Bibhuti Gautam from Jhapa automatically qualified for the top 10 finalists at the grand final round, held on 30 October in Hotel Yak & Yeti, Kathmandu.

Final Reveal 30 October 2021
Rank	+/-	Contestant	Rank	+/-	Contestant
1	Steady	(Nepal) Chitwan - Sagun Gurung	9	Steady	(Nepal) Rolpa - Pratikshya Mahara Chhetri
2	Steady	(Nepal) Jhapa - Bibhuti Gautam	10	Steady	(Nepal) Ramechhap - Mandira Karki
3	Steady	(Nepal) Gorkha - Smita Neupane	11	Steady	(Nepal) Chitwan - Anisha Poudel
4	Steady	(Nepal) Jhapa - Sadiksha Khadka	12	Steady	Kathmandu - Sagarika Malla
5	Steady	Maryland, USA - Sujita Basnet	13	Steady	Moscow, Russia - Nina Kant Mandal
6	Steady	Kathmandu - Bristi Acharya	14	Steady	Kathmandu - Arya Nishaant
7	Steady	Kathmandu - Rakchya Upreti	15	Steady	(Nepal) Lalitpur - Keshu Khadka
8	Steady	(Nepal) Bardiya - Pritima Panthi	16	Steady	Czech Republic - Smarika Karki

=== Judges ===
The contestants selected their judges from the Top 10 Q&A round. The contestants selected their judge through the category of which judge they want to talk to. The theme was seasons, the judges had their selected season for judging (Spring, Summer, Fall, Winter, Monsoon and Frost).

- Mannsi Agrawal (Monsoon) - Motivational Speaker and Corporate Trainer.
- Sareeta Shri Gyawali (Summer) - Nepali media personality
- Indira Joshi (Fall) - Nepali singer and musician
- Ishani Shrestha (Winter) - Winner of Miss Nepal 2013, Top 10 Finalist and Beauty With a Purpose Winner of Miss World 2013
- Ritu Singh Vaidya (Spring) - 1st Runner up of Femina Miss India 1991 and Top 10 Semifinalist of Miss World 1991
- Sneh Rana (Frost) - Professional Makeup Artist

== Previous Experience ==
- (#1) Anuska Adhikari was the 2nd Runner Up of Miss Teen Nepal 2016.
- (#2) Diksha Khati was a Top 10 finalist and the winner of Miss Talent at an unnamed pageant in 2017.
- (#3) Sapana Bhandari was the winner of Miss Tourism Ambassador Universe Nepal 2019.
- (#4) Surabhi Kanal was the winner of Miss Nepal USA 2019.
- (#5) Nina Kant Mandal was the winner of Miss Asia Russia 2018.
- (#6) Nina Kant Mandal was 2nd Runner Up of Miss Universe Nepal 2020.
- (#7) Sujita Basnet was the winner of Miss Nepal USA 2011 and became the first ever winner of Miss Nepal USA.
- (#8) Sujita Basnet was one of the winners of Miss Maryland World 2016.
- (#9) Sujita Basnet was one of the Top 12 semifinalists in Miss World America 2016.
- (#10) Sujita Basnet was 1st Runner Up of Miss Universe Nepal 2020.
- (#11) Keshu Khadka was the winner of Republica Miss Teen 2012.
- (#12) Rakchya Upreti was a Top 7 Finalist in Miss Nepal 2019.
