= Miss Cosmo Nepal =

National Beauty Pageant in Nepal

- Type: Women's beauty pageant
- Parent organization: Miss Vibhaa (2024); THT Miss Nepal (2025-present)
- Headquarters: Kathmandu, Nepal
- Country represented: Nepal
- Qualifies for: Miss Cosmo
- Current titleholder: Kashish Subba; Sunsari District
- National Director: Uddhab Adhikari (2024) Pramod Kansakar (present)
- Language: Nepalese; English

Miss Cosmo Nepal or Miss Nepal Cosmo is a beauty pageant title awarded to the delegate who represents Nepal at Miss Cosmo. The current national pageant which chooses Nepali representative for Miss Cosmo is THT Miss Nepal. The current Miss Cosmo Nepal is Kashish Subba of Dharan, Sunsari District of Koshi Province.

== History ==
On February 4, 2024, Miss Cosmo International announced Mr. Uddhab Adhikari, Chairman of Miss Vibhaa as the official license holder of Miss Cosmo Nepal. Nimita Regmi was crowned as the Miss Cosmo Nepal 2024.

On 24 June 2025, it was announced that Miss Cosmo Nepal will be held within the THT Miss Nepal as the official national contest for Miss Cosmo, but with a distinct social media presence.

== Editions and titleholders ==
=== Titleholders ===
Edition	Year	Miss Cosmo Nepal	District	Age	Ref.
3rd	2026	Kashish Subba	Sunsari	21	
2nd	2025	Deepshikha Nepal	Jhapa	24	
1st	2024	Nimita Regmi	Achham	24	

== International placements ==
Year	District	Representative	Placement	Special Awards	Ref.
2026	Dharan	Kashish Subba			
2025	Jhapa	Deepshikha Nepal	Unplaced	The T.E.A Cosmo Carnival Show (Top 10); Cosmo Impactful Beauty Award (Top 10)	
2024	Achham	Nimita Regmi	Unplaced	None	

== See also ==
- Miss Vibhaa
- Miss Nepal
- Miss Cosmo Vietnam
- Miss Universe Nepal
- Miss Teen Nepal
- Miss Grand Nepal
- Mister and Miss National Nepal
- List of beauty pageants
