= Miss Universe Nepal 2020 =

4th Edition of Miss Universe Nepal

- Date: December 30, 2020
- Hosts: Subeksha Khadka
- Venue: Kathmandu Marriott Hotel, Kathmandu, Nepal
- Broadcaster: AP1 TV
- Director: Uddhab Adhikari
- Entrants: 18
- Placements: 10
- Winner: Anshika Sharma; Sydney Australia
- Social Impact Leader: Nina Kant Mandal; Moscow Russia

Miss Universe Nepal 2020 (MUN 2020), was organized by Umanga Creation Pvt. Ltd, on 30 December 2020 at Kathmandu Marriott Hotel. Anshika Sharma won the pageant and became Nepal's representative at Miss Universe 2020.

The winner received NPR Rs. 1,000,000 as prize for winning the title as well as full support from the Umanga Creation Pvt. Ltd. for her chosen advocacy.

AP1 TV broadcast the pageant live and for all the Nepalese abroad and it was also live streamed on Youtube.

== Background ==
=== Location and date ===
The pageant was scheduled to be held on 30 December 2021. The press conference of the contest was conducted at the Kathmandu Marriott Hotel in Kathmandu, in which the Kathmandu Marriott Hotel in Kathmandu will be served as the venue for the close camp and the grand finale coronation.

List of the main events in the Miss Universe Nepal 2020 pageant
Location	Date	Event	Venue	Ref.
Final venue: Kathmandu (5 November – 30 December)	5 November	Registration Opening	Virtual	
Final venue: Kathmandu (5 November – 30 December)	9 November	Registration Ending	Virtual	
Final venue: Kathmandu (5 November – 30 December)	13 November	Top 50 Announcement	Virtual	
Final venue: Kathmandu (5 November – 30 December)	15 November	Top 50 Swimsuit Competition	Virtual	
Final venue: Kathmandu (5 November – 30 December)	18 November	Top 50 Speaking Skill & Ability Competition	Virtual	
Final venue: Kathmandu (5 November – 30 December)	19 November	Top 50 Question and Answer Competition	Virtual	
Final venue: Kathmandu (5 November – 30 December)	22 December	Top 18 Announcement	Virtual	
Final venue: Kathmandu (5 November – 30 December)	23 December	Close Camp Beginning	Kathmandu Marriott Hotel, Kathmandu	
Final venue: Kathmandu (5 November – 30 December)	25 December	Grand Final Press Presentation	Kathmandu Marriott Hotel, Kathmandu	
Final venue: Kathmandu (5 November – 30 December)	28 December	Preliminary Interview Competition	Kathmandu Marriott Hotel, Kathmandu	
Final venue: Kathmandu (5 November – 30 December)	28 December	Miss Universe Nepal 2020 Crown Reveal	Kathmandu Marriott Hotel, Kathmandu	
Final venue: Kathmandu (5 November – 30 December)	29 December	Close Camp Ending	Kathmandu Marriott Hotel, Kathmandu	
Final venue: Kathmandu (5 November – 30 December)	30 December	Grand Final Coronation	Kathmandu Marriott Hotel, Kathmandu	

=== Hosts and Performer ===
Subeksha Khadka (Miss Nepal International 2012 and World Miss University Nepal 2017) was made the official host by national director Nagma Shrestha (Miss Nepal Earth 2012, Top 8 Finalist of Miss Earth 2012 and Nepal's first ever representative at Miss Universe 2017. Subeksha hosted everything from the Top 50 Announcement. As for the final, Rabi Rajkarnikar hosted the event with Subeksha Khadka.

Shashwot Khadka was the performer for the Final Look of the 18 participants of Miss Universe Nepal 2020.

=== Selection of Participants ===
Applications for pageant started on 5 November and applications ended on 9 November. The official press presentation for the pageant was on 25 December 2020.

=== 'The BBB (Brave, Bold and Beautiful) Crown' ===
The headwear known as "The BBB (Brave, Bold and Beautiful) Crown" and was crafted by Apala Jewels.The crown is centered around three gems (Sapphire, Ruby and Diamond) that represent the all-inclusive platform and message of Brave, Bold and Beautiful (BBB). The crown is worth NPR Rs. 1,500,000 (US $12,700).

== Results ==
Final results	Contestant	International pageant	International Results
Miss Universe Nepal 2020	Sydney, Australia - Anshika Sharma (●)	Miss Universe 2020	Unplaced
1st runner-up	Maryland, United States - Sujita Basnet	Miss Universe 2021	Unplaced
2nd runner-up	Moscow, Russia - Nina Kant Mandal (฿)		
3rd runner-up	(Nepal) Chandragiri - Dikta Thapa (●)		
4th runner-up	(Nepal) Biratnagar - Nancy Khadka (●)	Miss International 2022	Unplaced
Top 10	(Nepal) Dhulikhel – Parichhya Bista (●)		
Top 10	Kathmandu – Priya Sigdel		
Top 10	(Nepal) Lalitpur – Paramita Rana		
Top 10	(Nepal) Lalitpur – Roshni Khatri		
Top 10	(Nepal) Pokhara – Arika Ranabhat		

(●): The candidates won the Miss Popular Choice Award (online voting) and got direct entry into Top 10 Finalists.
(฿): The candidate won the Social Impact Leader Award (Best BBB (Brave, Bold and Beautiful) Social Advocacy) and got direct entry into Top 10 Finalists.

=== Special awards ===
Award	Contestant
Miss Fabulous	(Nepal) Biratnagar - Nancy Khadka
Miss Fierce	Sydney, Australia - Anshika Sharma
Miss Lifestyle	Maryland, United States - Sujita Basnet
Social Impact Leader	Moscow, Russia - Nina Kant Mandal
Miss Popular Choice	(Nepal) Biratnagar - Nancy Khadka; (Nepal) Chandragiri - Dikta Thapa; (Nepal) Dhulikhel - Parichhya Bista; Sydney, Australia - Anshika Sharma

==== Miss Popular Choice ====
The winner of the "Miss Popular Choice" was determined via a public paid voting on the Khalti app. Nancy Khadka from Biratnagar, Dikta Thapa from Chandragiri, Anshika Sharma from Sydney and Parichhya Bista from Dhulikhel automatically qualified for the top 10 finalists at the grand final round, held on 30 December in Hotel Marriott, Kathmandu.

First Reveal 30 December 2020
Rank	+/-	Contestant	Rank	+/-	Contestant
1	Steady	(Nepal) Chandragiri - Dikta Thapa	10	Steady	(Nepal) Nuwakot - Rajani Mishra
2	Steady	Sydney, Australia - Anshika Sharma	11	Steady	Maryland, USA - Sujita Basnet
3	Steady	(Nepal) Biratnagar - Nancy Khadka	12	Steady	(Nepal) Sindhupalchowk - Priya Hada
4	Steady	(Nepal) Pokhara - Arika Ranabhat	13	Steady	(Antwerp Province) Antwerp, Belgium - Jyoti Bhatta
5	Steady	(Nepal) Lalitpur - Paramita Rana	14	Steady	Kathmandu - Priya Sigdel
6	Steady	(Nepal) Dhulikhel - Parichhya Bista	15	Steady	(Nepal) Kavrepalanchok - Angel Lama
7	Steady	(Nepal) Chunikhel - Roshni Khatri	16	Steady	Virginia, USA - Surabhi Kanal
8	Steady	(Nepal) Jumla - Sudati Shrestha	17	Steady	Moscow, Russia - Nina Kant Mandal
9	Steady	Kathmandu - Rozina Shrestha	18	Steady	(Nepal) Pokhara - Rose Tamang

Final Reveal 30 December 2020
Rank	+/-	Contestant	Rank	+/-	Contestant
1	▲1	(Nepal) Biratnagar - Nancy Khadka	10	▲7	Moscow, Russia - Nina Kant Mandal
2	▼1	(Nepal) Chandragiri - Dikta Thapa	11	▼3	(Nepal) Jumla - Sudati Shrestha
3	▼1	Sydney, Australia - Anshika Sharma	12	▼3	Kathmandu - Rozina Shrestha
4	▲2	(Nepal) Dhulikhel - Parichhya Bista	13	▼3	(Nepal) Nuwakot - Rajani Mishra
5	▲2	(Nepal) Chunikhel - Roshni Khatri	14	▼2	(Nepal) Sindhupalchowk - Priya Hada
6	▼2	(Nepal) Pokhara - Arika Ranabhat	15	▼2	(Antwerp Province) Antwerp, Belgium - Jyoti Bhatta
7	▲7	Kathmandu - Priya Sigdel	16	▼1	(Nepal) Kavrepalanchok - Angel Lama
8	▲3	Maryland, USA - Sujita Basnet	17	▼1	Virginia, USA - Surabhi Kanal
9	▼4	(Nepal) Lalitpur - Paramita Rana	18	Steady	(Nepal) Pokhara - Rose Tamang

=== Judges ===
The contestants selected their judges from the Top 10 Q&A round. The contestants selected their judge through the category of which judge they want to talk to. The theme was gemstones, the judges had their selected gemstone for judging (Sapphire, Ruby, Amethyst, Topaz, Emerald and Diamond).

- Malvika Subba (Diamond) - Winner of Miss Nepal 2002 and Nepali media personality.
- Anupama Khunjeli (Ruby) - Chief Executive Officer of Mega Bank Nepal
- Usha Rajak (Sapphire) - Nepali Cinema (Kollywood) actress
- Prerana Shah (Topaz) - 1st Runner up of Miss Nepal 2003, Top 10 Finalist of Miss Asia Pacific International 2003 and international holistic health and transformation specialist.
- Charu Chadha (Emerald) - Chief Editor of Media 9 Nepal
- Abhaya Subba (Amethyst) - Nepali singer, songwriter and musician.

== Previous Experience ==
- (#1) Rozina Shrestha won Miss Tourism World Nepal 2019.
- (#2) Surabhi Kanal was the winner of Miss Nepal USA 2019.
- (#3) Nina Kant Mandal was the winner of Miss Asia Russia 2018.
- (#4) Sujita Basnet was the winner of Miss Nepal USA 2011 and became the first ever winner of Miss Nepal USA.
- (#5) Sujita Basnet was one of the winners of Miss Maryland World 2016.
- (#6) Sujita Basnet was one of the Top 12 semifinalists in Miss World America 2016.
- (#7) Anshika Sharma was 1st runner up in Miss Nepal Oceania 2020.
- (#8) Priya Sigdel was crowned as Miss Nepal Earth in Miss Nepal 2018.
- (#9) Priya Sigdel was one of the top 18 semifinalists in Miss Earth 2018.
- (#10) Jyoti Bhatta was 2nd runner up in Miss Nepal Europe 2020 representing Belgium.
- (#11) Roshni Khatri was 1st runner up in Miss Nepal 2016 and was crowned as Miss Nepal Earth for 2016.
- (#12) Roshni Khatri represented Nepal in Miss Earth 2016.
- (#13) Angel Lama competed for Nepal in Miss International Queen 2019.
- (#14) Paramita Rana was the 1st runner up in Face of Classic Diamond 2014.
