= Miss Nepal 2026 =

Beauty pageant in Nepal

- Date: 1 August 2026
- Presenters: Sanjay Silwal Gupta; Roneeshma Shrestha
- Venue: The Plaza, Lalitpur, Nepal
- Broadcaster: Himalaya TV
- Entrants: 24
- Placements: 13
- Winner: Deepmala Dhakal; Miss Nepal World Kashis Subba; Miss Nepal Cosmo Arya Nishaant; Miss Nepal International

The Hidden Treasure Miss Nepal 2026, was the 30th Miss Nepal pageant held on 1 August 2026 at The Plaza, Lalitpur. Nepalese delegates for Miss World 2027, Miss Cosmo 2026, Miss International 2026 were be selected.

Luna Luitel crowned Deepmala Dhakal as Miss Nepal World 2026. Deepshikha Nepal crowned Kashis Subba as Miss Cosmo Nepal 2026. Urusha Bhandari crowned Arya Nishaant as Miss Nepal International 2026.

The pageant was live streamed nationally on Himalaya TV and internationally on Himalaya TV Youtube.

== Regional auditions ==
To ensure that the pageant inclusivity and regionally diversity, the auditions were held in provincial level. Provincial auditions were held in Koshi Province, Gandaki Province, Madhesh Province, Bagmati Province, and Lumbini Province. The final audition in Kathmandu was held on 19 June 2026 at The Plaza, Pulchowk in Kathmandu, Nepal. The selected Top 24 finalists competed at the grand coronation event of Miss Nepal 2025 on 1 August 2026.

== Results ==
=== Placements ===
Placement	Contestant	International placement
Miss Nepal World 2026	Hong Kong – Deepmala Dhakal	TBA – Miss World 2027
Miss Nepal Cosmo 2026	(Nepal) Dharan – Kashis Subba	TBA – Miss Cosmo 2026
Miss Nepal International 2026	(Nepal) Lalitpur – Arya Nishaant	TBA – Miss International 2026
Top 6	(Nepal) Solukhumbu – Bibhusha Basnet; Kathmandu – Shitanshu Dhakal; (Nepal) Nawalparasi – Swikriti Gyawali	
Top 12	(Nepal) Achham – Anshu Kunwar; (Nepal) Sarlahi – Arbisha Thapa§	
Top 12	(Nepal) Bhairahawa – Prema Lamgade	TBA – MGI All Stars 2nd Edition
Top 12	Kathmandu – Sezja Shrestha; (Nepal) Birgunj – Shreeyashi Shrestha; (Nepal) Kavrepalanchok – Shraddha Adhikari☆	

§ – Voted into the Top 12 by viewers and awarded as Miss Popular Choice
☆ – Fast Track Event winner into the Top 12

=== Special awards ===
Special Awards	Winner
Brij Cement Miss Confident	Hong Kong – Deepmala Dhakal
Miss Health and Haramony	Hong Kong – Deepmala Dhakal
BYD Miss Green Visionary	Hong Kong – Deepmala Dhakal
THT Miss Beauty with a Purpose	Hong Kong – Deepmala Dhakal
Miss Popular Choice	Sarlahi – Arbisha Thapa
Yeti Airlines Women with Wings	Solukhumbu – Bibhusha Basnet
Miss Beautiful Hair	Birgunj – Shreeyashi Shrestha
Creative D Miss Photogenic	Syangja – Yukta Paudel
Farmasi Face of the Year	Bhaktapur – Chadani Shrestha
Xiaomi Miss Multimedia	Bhairahawa – Prema Lamgade
Miss Pristine	Kathmandu – Sezja Shrestha
Miss DHI	Pokhara – Sangita Paudel
Miss Sparkling Diva	Bhairahawa – Prema Lamgade
Miss Empowered Choices	Kathmandu – Shitanshu Dhakal
The Kathmandu Post Miss Intellectual	Kathmandu – Shitanshu Dhakal
Miss Active	Kavrepalanchok – Shraddha Adhikari
Kajaria Miss Top Model	Dharan – Kashis Subba

== BYD Miss Green Visionary ==
- Advanced to the Top 12 via Debate challenge.

Placement	Candidate
Winner	Hong Kong – Deepmala Dhakal
Top 2	Kathmandu – Shitanshu Dhakal
Top 12	(Nepal) Pokhara – Sangita Paudel; (Nepal) Kavrepalanchok – Shraddha Adhikari; Kathmandu – Manasvi Sharma; (Nepal) Kanchanpur – Sushma Bhandari; (Nepal) Gorkha – Mahima Panta; Kathmandu – Sezja Shrestha; (Nepal) Solukhumbu – Bibhusha Basnet; (Nepal) Sarlahi – Arbisha Thapa; (Nepal) Nawalparasi – Swikriti Gyawali; (Nepal) Sindhupalchok – Rachana Bhattarai

=== Head-to-Head Challenge ===
==== Round 1 ====
- Advanced to Round 2 of the Head-to-Head Challenge.

Contestant	Group 1	Group 2	Group 3	Group 4	Group 5	Group 6
1	Arbisha Thapa	Aayushma K.C. Khatri	Sezja Shrestha	Esha Subedi	Bibhusha Basnet	Pranisha Khanal
2	Chadani Shrestha	Pratima Khadka	Shraddha Adhikari	Deepmala Dhakal	Mahima Panta	Rachana Bhattarai
3	Kashis Subba	Shreeyashi Shrestha	Shitanshu Dhakal	Sangita Paudel	Prema Lamgade	Pratistha Acharya
4	Manasvi Sharma	Yukta Paudel	Swikriti Gyawali			Arya Nishaant

== Contestants ==
26 contestants will compete for the title.

No	Representing	Contestant	Age (Note: Ages at the time of the pageant)	Height	Education
1	Canada	Esha Subedi	25	5 ft 4 in (1.63 m)	Recruiter Account Specialist
2	(Nepal) Arghakhanchi	Pranisha Khanal	22	5 ft 4 in (1.63 m)	BA of Engineering (Civil Engineering)
3	(Nepal) Syangja	Yukta Paudel	23	5 ft 6 in (1.68 m)	BA in Psychology
4	(Nepal) Achham	Anshu Kunwar	25	5 ft 9 in (1.75 m)	BBA in Finance
5	(Nepal) Pokhara	Sangita Paudel	23	5 ft 5 in (1.65 m)	BA in Psychology
6	(Nepal) Kavrepalanchok	Shraddha Adhikari	25	5 ft 8 in (1.73 m)	MBBS
7	(Nepal) Dharan	Kashis Subba	21	5 ft 7.5 in (1.71 m)	BA in Fashion Design
8	Kathmandu	Manasvi Sharma	22	5 ft 5 in (1.65 m)	BSc in Computer Science
9	(Nepal) Kanchanpur	Sushma Bhandari	25	5 ft 4.5 in (1.64 m)	Bachelor of Laws
10	(Nepal) Bhaktapur	Pratistha Acharya	20	5 ft 4 in (1.63 m)	Bachelor of Business Administration
11	(Nepal) Lalitpur	Arya Nishaant	24	5 ft 6 in (1.68 m)	BA in Finance and Investment
12	(Nepal) Jhapa	Aayushma K.C. Khatri	24	5 ft 8 in (1.73 m)	Bachelor of Science in Nursing
13	Kathmandu	Shitanshu Dhakal	25	5 ft 6 in (1.68 m)	MBBS
14	Australia	Pratima Khadka	26	5 ft 4 in (1.63 m)	Master of Social Work
15	(Nepal) Bhairahawa	Prema Lamgade	26	5 ft 6 in (1.68 m)	BA in Humanities
16	(Nepal) Gorkha	Mahima Panta	20	5 ft 5.5 in (1.66 m)	BA in Finance and Investment
17	Hong Kong	Deepmala Dhakal	24	5 ft 7.5 in (1.71 m)	BA in Finance and Economics
18	Kathmandu	Sezja Shrestha	22	5 ft 4 in (1.63 m)	BA in Computer Engineering
19	(Nepal) Solukhumbu	Bibhusha Basnet	22	5 ft 7.5 in (1.71 m)	Bachelor of Business Administration
20	(Nepal) Nawalparasi	Swikriti Gyawali	25	5 ft 6 in (1.68 m)	Master of Business Administration
21	(Nepal) Bhaktapur	Chadani Shrestha	23	5 ft 7.5 in (1.71 m)	Bachelor of Business Management
22	(Nepal) Birgunj	Shreeyashi Shrestha	25	5 ft 6 in (1.68 m)	BSc in Cybersecurity
23	(Nepal) Sarlahi	Arbisha Thapa	23	5 ft 5.5 in (1.66 m)	Bachelor's Degree
24	(Nepal) Sindhupalchok	Rachana Bhattarai	25	5 ft 7 in (1.70 m)	BA of Business Management and BA of Laws

== Previous Pageant Experience ==
- Arya Nishaant was Miss Universe Nepal 2021 Top 10 finalist.
- Anshu Kunwar was Miss Tourism World Nepal 2024.
- Chandani Shrestha was Joy Model Hunt Nepal Season 9 2nd Runner Up.
- Bibhusha Basnet was the winner of Miss Leo Nepal 2023.
- Deepmala Dhakal was crowned Miss Nepal Hong Kong 2026.
- Kashish Subba was Face of Nepal 2023 winner.
- Prema Lamgade was Miss Grand Nepal 2024 and Miss Universe Nepal 2023 Top 22 semi finalist.
- Sangita Paudel was Miss Universe Nepal 2023 Top 10 finalist.
- Shraddha Adhikari was Mister and Miss National Nepal 2024 Top 10 finalist.
- Yukta Paudel was Milano Runway Vol 2 Finalist.
