= Image Channel =

Nepali television channel

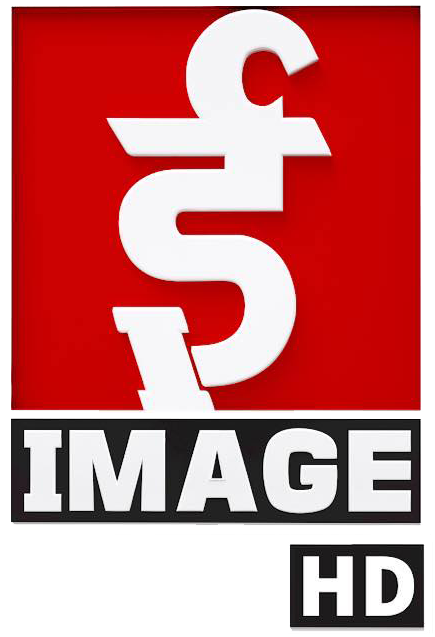
- Image Channel logo
- Country: Nepal
- Broadcast area: Nepal & Worldwide
- Network: Broadcast television and online
- Headquarters: Panipokhari, Kathmandu

Programming
- Languages: English, Nepali, Nepal Bhasa
- Picture format: 4:3 (576i, HDTV)

Ownership
- Owner: Image Channel Pvt. Ltd
- Sister channels: Image Metro (discontinued)

History
- Launched: 2003

Links
- Website: Image Channel

The Image Channel is a private television channel in Nepal. It is owned by Image Group of Companies, which also runs FM station and is located in Lazimpat, Kathmandu. It produces several kinds of news programs, talk shows, entertainment shows, tele serials, etc. Image Channel went on air with a 1 1/2-hour block through Nepal Television on 25 January 1997. Its initial programs were focused on pop music, women, celebrity and fashion. Programs such as Image Pop, Button & Trades, AM Guest and Srijana ko Sansar gained popularity among the audiences.

Image then established itself as an inclusive Kathmandu channel called the Image Metro on 11 February 2003. On 5 February 2007 Image expanded its broadcasts with worldwide satellite transmissions, becoming the first Nepali-language satellite channel. Image has also launched an online news portal called Image Khabar on May 5, 2013.

April 2016, Police arrested a man on charge of hacking a Facebook page of Image Channel from Nepalgunj of Banke.

== List of programs broadcast by Image Channel ==
=== News ===
- Image News
- Image Sambad
- Image Bisesh

=== Music ===
- Image Pop
- Sms and More
- MOYC (Music Of Your Choice)
- Ukali Orali

=== Yearly event ===
- Image Music Awards
- Miss Universe Nepal (2021, 2022)
- Miss Vibhaa 2024

=== Reality ===
- Mega Model
- Image Lok Kalakar
- Image Rodhi Ghar

== Events ==
Bharat Regmi at the 9th Award Ceremony.

- Tuborg Image Awards, Nepals Biggest Music Award

== See also ==
- List of Nepali television stations
