= Prema Lamgade =

Nepalese model and beauty queen

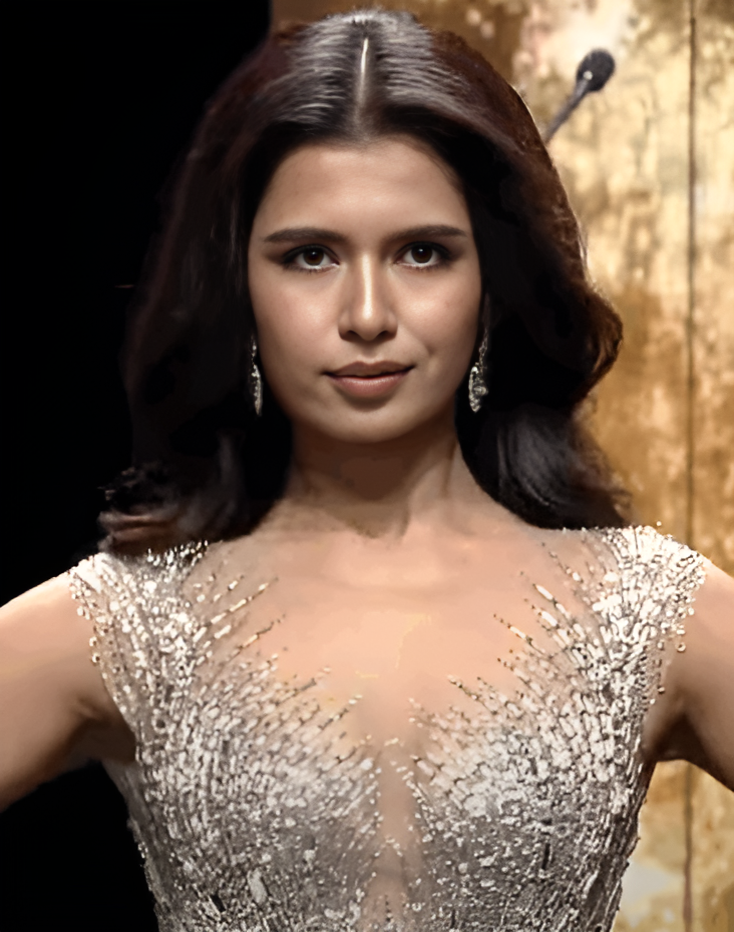
- Prema Lamgade in 2024
- Born: October 26, 2001 (age 25); Bhairahawa, Nepal
- Occupations: Model, content creator
- Height: 5 ft 6 in (168 cm)
- Beauty pageant titleholder
- Title: Miss Vibhaa Grand 2024 (Resigned)
- Years active: 2023–present
- Hair color: Black
- Eye color: Brown
- Major competitions: Miss Universe Nepal 2023; (Top 22); Miss Vibhaa 2024; (Winner, resigned); Miss Grand International 2024; (Unplaced); MGI All Stars 2nd Edition; (TBD)

Prema Lamgade (born 2001) is a Nepalese model, content creator, and beauty pageant titleholder of Miss Vibhaa Grand 2024. She represented Nepal at the Miss Grand International 2024 pageant.

== Early life and education ==
Prema Lamgade was born in Bhairahawa, Rupandehi District, Nepal on 26 October 1999. From a young age, she faced bullying, which shaped her commitment to promoting kindness and inclusivity. She pursued a career in modeling and content creation, advocating for empathy and social awareness.

== Pageantry ==
=== Miss Universe Nepal 2023 ===
She had previously participated in Miss Universe Nepal 2023, where she finished at Top 22. During the competition, she also earned the titles NIU Miss Eco Infinity and WOW Magazine Miss Free & Fearless.

=== Miss Vibhaa 2024 ===
Prema Lamgade won Miss Vibhaa Grand 2024 title in Miss Vibhaa 2024 pageant, organized by Umanga Creation Pvt. Ltd. Representing Bhairahawa, she was crowned the winner among 45 contestants at a grand finale held on 11 September 2024 at Heritage Garden, Sanepa, Lalitpur. In February 2026, she resigned from her position at Miss Vibhaa 2024, citing issues of mistreatment, defamation and caste-based discrimination from the national organization.

=== Miss Grand International 2024 ===
As the titleholder of Miss Vibhaa/ Miss Grand Nepal 2024, Lamgade represented Nepal at Miss Grand International 2024 where she was unplaced. However, she resigned from her position at Miss Vibhaa (Miss Grand Nepal) in 2026, recalling the mistreatment from the national organization

=== Miss Nepal 2026 ===
Prema entered the Miss Nepal 2026 pageant as 'Contestant No. 6' representing Bhairahawa City of Rupandehi District. She reached the Top 12 Round of Miss Nepal. She also earned subtitles of Miss Multimedia and Miss Sparkling Diva.

=== MGI All Stars Second Edition ===
Prema Lamgade was crowned as MGI All Stars Nepal for representing Nepal at the MGI All Stars 2nd Edition after her pageant experience in Miss Grand International 2024.

== Advocacy ==
Lamgade uses her platform to raise awareness about bullying and to promote inclusion and compassion in society. Her advocacy work focuses on creating a culture of empathy, particularly among youth.

== Social media ==
She is active on social media platforms, especially Instagram and TikTok, where she shares her modeling work, advocacy campaigns, and personal insights.
