= Oli (surname) =

- Pronunciation: /oːli/
- Language: Nepali, Sanskrit, Burmese, Dzongkha, Kumaoni, Garhwali, Doteli

Origin
- Language: Khas
- Region of origin: Kumaon; Garhwal

Other names
- Derivatives: Oli K.C.; Oli Sharma

Oli (Nepali: ओली) is a surname of Khas people of Nepal, found among Hindus such as Hill Brahmin, particularly among Kumai Brahmins, and Hill Kshatriya, particularly among K.C. (Khatri Chhetri) communities. The surname is also found among Nepalese diaspora communities in countries such as Bhutan, India, Myanmar, and elsewhere around the world.

== Etymology ==
The Oli surname is generally classified as being of Kumai Brahmins origin within the broader Khas group. People bearing the surname are traditionally believed to have originated from the Kumaon and Garhwal region of present-day India. Because of this association, the surname is commonly classified within the Kumai Brahmin category, distinct from the Purbiya Brahmin category, whose origins are mostly linked to the Karnali region of present-day Nepal.

== Family traditions ==
The people with the Oli surname traditionally worship Masto as their family deity (Kuladevata). The traditional form of worship follows Hindu customs and includes animal sacrifices.

== Notable people ==
- Khadga Prasad Oli, former Prime Minister of Nepal
- Khusbu Oli, Nepalese model and politician
- Komal Oli, Nepalese singer and politician

== See also ==
- Saptarishi
