= Sujita Basnet =

American model (born 1993)

- Born: Sujita Basnet; May 10, 1993 (age 33); Maryland, U.S.
- Education: North Point High School
- Alma mater: George Washington University
- Height: 1.68 m (5 ft 6 in)
- Beauty pageant titleholder
- Title: Miss Universe Nepal 2021
- Hair color: Black
- Eye color: Black
- Major competitions: Miss Nepal USA 2011 (Winner); Miss Universe 2021 (Unplaced)

Sujita Basnet (Nepali: सुजिता बस्नेत) (born 10 May 1993) is an American-Nepalese beauty pageant titleholder and a management consultant who participated in many beauty pageants from 2011 to 2021. She was crowned as Miss Universe Nepal 2021. She represented Nepal at Miss Universe 2021. She was also the first runner up to Miss Universe Nepal 2020. She works as a management consultant for Fortune 500 companies and holds a bachelor’s in biomedical engineering.

== Early life ==
Sujita Basnet was born in Maryland to single mother Reena Karki and raised in Kathmandu, Nepal by her grandparents until the age of 5 while her mother was completing her studies in the United States. Sujita completed her education at North Point High School in Bennsville, Maryland. After her high school education in Maryland, she moved to Washington D.C., to attend George Washington University. She graduated with a bachelor's degree in Biomedical / Medical Engineering.

== Career ==
From January 2013 to April 2013, Sujita was a congressional intern in the office of U.S. representative Ami Bera at the United States Capitol, in Washington D.C. From May 2013 to September 2013, she served as a 2013 Peace Fellow in Dang, Nepal. From January 2014 to January 2015, she was an undergraduate research assistant at the Center for Neuroscience Research in Washington D.C. In May 2015, she joined Privatin Consulting in Baltimore, Maryland as a business analyst. In May 2016, she was promoted to senior business analyst at Privatin Consulting. She was promoted to management consultant in May 2017, and later to senior lead consultant of Privatin Consulting in May 2018. She officially left Privatin Consulting in February 2019 and she joined Accenture Federal Services as a management consultant in April 2019.

In November 2016, she founded the Liberated Scholarship Program, to support young Nepali women from lower castes, through tertiary level education, leadership training and full-time job placement support.

== Pageantry ==
On the 20th of August 2011, Sujita entered the very first Miss Nepal USA pageant at age 18. She won the competition and was awarded the title of Miss Best Catwalk during the coronation night held at the Sheraton Hotel in Flushing, New York. She competed again in 2016 Miss Maryland World where she was one of the winners of the pageant. She represented Maryland in Miss World America 2016 where she came in the top-12 semifinalists with extra achievements of Top-5 in both Beach Beauty and Top Model. She participated again in Miss Maryland World 2019 where she ended up as 1st runner up in the pageant. On November 11, 2019, she participated in Miss Maryland USA 2019 where she came 2nd runner up in the pageant and also won the People's Choice Award. On December 30, 2020, she competed in Miss Universe Nepal 2020 where she ended up as 1st runner-up. She also won the title of Miss Lifestyle. She participated again in Miss Universe Nepal 2021 where she won in her final year of pageant eligibility, and she won the titles of Miss Fabulous and Miss Fierce during the pageant.

In an interview she said that she participated again to achieve her dreams as Miss Universe Nepal, she says that what sets her apart from the past Miss winners is that she is very resilient, and she never gives up. She had an amazing journey last time in 2020 and she is ready to achieve her dreams. Her social advocacy is BASE (Backward Education Society) which is about educating the underprivileged children of Nepal where she said, "I feel privileged to have had this opportunity to give a voice for justice to those children who have dismissed the idea of a better life". She represented Nepal at Miss Universe 2021 in Eilat, Israel.

=== Pageants trivia ===
Competition	Placement	Location	Special Awards	Represented	Date
Miss Nepal USA 2011	Winner	New York	Miss Best Catwalk	Maryland	August 20, 2011
Miss Maryland World 2016	Winner	Maryland		Maryland	
Miss World America 2016	Top 12	(United States) National Harbor, Maryland	Top 5 – Beach Beauty; Top 3 – Top Model	Maryland	July 8, 2016
Miss World Maryland 2019	1st Runner-Up	Maryland		Maryland	
Miss Maryland USA 2020	2nd Runner-Up	Maryland	Public Choice Award		November 11, 2019
Miss Universe Nepal 2020	1st Runner-Up	Kathmandu, Nepal	Miss Lifestyle	Maryland, United States	December 30, 2020
Miss Universe Nepal 2021	Winner	Kathmandu, Nepal	Miss Fabulous; Miss Fierce	Maryland, United States	October 30, 2021
Miss Universe 2021	Unplaced	Eilat, Israel		Nepal	December 13, 2021

Awards and achievements
Preceded by Anshika Sharma	Miss Universe Nepal; 2021	Succeeded by Sophiya Bhujel
