= Jane Dipika Garrett =

Nepalese-American beauty pageant titleholder

Jane Garrett
- जेन दिपिका ग्यारेट
- Born: Jane Dipika Garrett; October 2000 (age 25–26); United States
- Occupations: Model; Nurse
- Height: 5 ft 7 in (170 cm)
- Beauty pageant titleholder
- Title: Miss Universe Nepal 2023
- Major competitions: Miss Universe Nepal 2023 (Winner); Miss Universe 2023 (Top 20)

Jane Dipika Garrett (born October 2000) is a Nepalese beauty-pageant title-holder of Miss Universe Nepal 2023 and body-positivity advocate who competed in the Miss Universe 2023.

In November 2023, Jane gained international attention, after she created history by becoming the first plus-size contestant to participate in an international beauty pageant competition. She represented Nepal at Miss Universe 2023 and placed as a semi-finalist, the first Miss Nepal in the top twenty since 2018. Her placement marked the first time that a plus-sized contestant had ever reached the semi-finals.

== Life and career ==
Garrett was born in the United States and raised in Kathmandu, Nepal. Her father is American and her mother is of Nepalese descent. A nurse and business developer by profession, she is a supporter of women's hormonal, mental, and physical health after she experienced depression due to polyendocrine metabolic ovarian syndrome (PMOS).

She describes her goal to inform others about hormone imbalances and the potential effects they can have on mental health. Jane frequently uses social media to alter perceptions of women's beauty and normalise plus-size bodies.

In September 2023, Jane competed in the Miss Universe Nepal 2023. She was crowned the winner, making history as the first plus-size competitor to triumph in a national pageant.

"As a woman who is curvy and who does not meet certain beauty standards, I’m here to represent women who are curvy, who struggle with weight gain, who struggle with hormonal issues", said Jane after winning the Miss Universe Nepal 2023 title.

At the preliminary competition of the Miss Universe 2023, which took place in El Salvador on 15 November 2023, she emerged as a crowd favourite. She also became the first ever plus-size competitor at an international beauty pageant to place in the top 20 semi-finals.

Awards and achievements
| Preceded by Sophiya Bhujel | Miss Universe Nepal; 2023 | Succeeded by Sampada Ghimire (under new org.) |
