= Deepmala Dhakal =

Winner of Miss Nepal 2026

Deepmala Dhakal दीपमाला ढकाल
- Born: 11 May 2002 (age 24); Hong Kong
- Education: University of Hong Kong (BEc)
- Occupation: Finance
- Height: 5 ft (1.5 m)
- Beauty pageant titleholder
- Title: Miss Nepal World 2026
- Major competitions: Miss Nepal 2026; (Winner); Miss World 2027; (TBD)

Deepmala Dhakal (Nepali: दीपमाला ढकाल) is a Nepalese beauty pageant titleholder who won Miss Nepal World 2026. She will represent Nepal at Miss World 2027.

== Early life and family background ==
She was born on 11 May 2002 in Hong Kong to Surendra Kumar Dhakal, an engineer, and Roshani Kharel. Her maternal grandfather was Ratna Prasad Kharel, a former minister of Nepal. She graduated with a bachelor's degree in finance and economics from the University of Hong Kong and has worked as an investment strategist at BlackRock. She is a member of Hong Kong Toastmasters, a public speaking organization.

== Miss Nepal ==
Deepmala was appointed as Miss Nepal Hong Kong 2026, which gave her direct entry into Miss Nepal 2026. Her mother's participation in the inaugural edition of the competition inspired her to join the contest. In the national contest, she won four special awards; Brij Cement Miss Confident, Miss Health and Haramony, BYD Miss Green Visionary, and THT Miss Beauty with a Purpose.

Awards and achievements
Preceded by Luna Luitel (Kathmandu)	Miss Nepal World; 2026	Incumbent
