= Miss Universe Nepal =

National beauty pageant competition in Nepal

- मिस युनिभर्स नेपाल
- Formation: 2017; 9 years ago
- Type: Beauty pageant TV Reality Series
- Headquarters: Kathmandu
- Members: Miss Universe
- Official language: Nepali; English
- National Director: Sangita Puri (2024-present); Nagma Shrestha (2020-2023); Gopal Kakshapati (2017-2019)
- Parent organization: The Hidden Treasure (2017-2019) Umanga Creation (2020-2023) Global Glamour Venture (2024-present)
- Website: https://missuniversenepalglobalglamour.com/

Miss Universe Nepal (MUN) (Nepali: मिस युनिभर्स नेपाल) is a beauty pageant competition that selects the country representative for Miss Universe.

== History ==
The Miss Universe Nepal officially began in 2017 when Nagma Shrestha was appointed as Miss Universe Nepal by The Hidden Treasure, which also crowned Manita Devkota in 2018 and Pradeepta Adhikari in 2019. Manita Devkota got first ever placement for Nepal at Miss Universe 2018 as she entered the Top 10 finalists.

In 2020, Umanga Creation became the license holder of the pageant and assigned Nagma Shrestha as national director. Title holders from 2020 to 2023 are Anshika Sharma, Sujita Basnet, Sophiya Bhujel and Jane Dipika Garett respectively. Jane Dipika Garrett got placed at Top 20 of Miss Universe 2023, and also got recognition as the first plus size model to enter Miss Universe Semi Finals.

In early 2024, Global Glamour Venture acquired the license for further editions of Miss Universe Nepal, with Sangita Puri as national director. MUN 2026 Prayashna Gurung did not compete at Miss Universe 2026, marking Nepal's first withdrawal at Miss Universe.

== Pageant Format ==
As of 2025, the pageant is organized in a Television Reality Series format, with the following basic rounds, which can be altered according to the requirements of international pageant.

=== Selection of Participants ===
Registrations are generally announced about a month prior to the pageant activities. The mode of registrations are virtual done by apps like "Khalti" and Miss Universe Nepal website.

Eligibility Criteria:

- Applicant must be Nepali Citizen/ Non-Resident Nepali aged 18 or above who identifies as a woman.
- No height/weight criteria and no criteria on other physical measurements.
- Competition is open to all adult women; married, unmarried or divorced.
- Pregnant women, mother of children can participate in the competition as per the guidelines of Miss Universe.
- Minimum Academic qualification: 10+2/Equivalent or above.

=== Auditions Round ===
After the registrations, 60 qualifiers are selected based on their credentials (walk video and introductory note submitted with application form). The top 60 qualifiers perform in catwalk round, Q/A round at physical auditions which is telecasted on sponsored TV Channel. Top scorers are advanced to Top 35 by judges' score

=== Preliminary Competition ===
The Top 35 is revealed to public in a televised 'Sash Ceremony'. Then they go to a month long grooming session where they are trained on walk, etiquette, stage presence, artistry, communication and social works. Prior to the grand finals, Top 35 performs in a live-streamed preliminary swimsuit, advocacy presentation round and closed door interviews.

=== The Grand Finale ===
At the grand finale, Top 15 is selected from Top 35 based on preliminary and closed door interviews. The contestant with best advocacy presentation and one highest voted contestant advances directly to Top 15 and the rest spots are fulfilled by judges' score. Then, top 15 perform in swimsuit round after which Top 10 is announced. Then, Top 10 performs in Evening Gowns after which the Top 5 is selected. Then, the Top 5 performs in Q/A round, based on which the winner of the contest is crowned as The Miss Universe Nepal.

== Titleholders ==
Editions	Miss Universe Nepal	Runners up				Venue	Host city
Editions	Miss Universe Nepal	First	Second	Third	Fourth	Venue	Host city
2026/27	Prayashna Gurung Bhairahawa, Nepal/ London, UK	Binita Oli Jhapa, Nepal	Ambika Rana Pokhara, Nepal/ Uttar Pradesh, India	Shraddha Adhikari Kavreplanchowk, Nepal	Aditi Shrestha Sindhuli, Nepal	The Soaltee	Kathmandu, Nepal
2025	Sanya Adhikari Kathmandu, Nepal/ Bangkok, Thailand	Aarohi Basnet Kathmandu, Nepal	Sonalisa Dhungana Bagmati, Nepal/ Toronto, Canada	Alina Yary Banke, Nepal/ Sydney, Australia	Jyoti Thapa Lalitpur, Nepal	Royal Tulip Kathmandu	Gwarko, Lalitpur, Nepal
2024	Sampada Ghimire; Bhaktapur, Nepal	Smriti Singh; Lalitpur, Nepal	Akshita Chhetri; Kathmandu, Nepal / Dubai, UAE	Karren Eva Murray; Lalitpur, Nepal	Sujal Bam; Doti, Nepal	Godavari Sunrise Convention Center	Lalitpur
2023	Jane Dipika Garrett; Kathmandu, Nepal/ New York, USA	Garima Ghimire; Biratnagar, Nepal	Buddhisara Sunar; Adelaide, Australia / Tanahun, Nepal	Shitashma Pokharel; Lalitpur, Nepal	Abhilasha Lamsal; Lalitpur, Nepal	Godavari Sunrise Convention Center	Lalitpur
2022	Sophiya Bhujel; Kathmandu, Nepal	Bipana Adhikari (Resigned); Sydney, Australia / Dhading, Nepal Ashma KC (Successor); Adelaide, Australia / Kathmandu, Nepal	Sefina Joshi; Kathmandu, Nepal	Monalisha Parajuli; Udayapur, Nepal	Jasmine Khadka; Kathmandu, Nepal	Hotel Yak & Yeti	Kathmandu
2021	Sujita Basnet; Maryland, USA/ Kathmandu, Nepal	Nina Kant Mandal; Moscow, Russia / Saptari, Nepal	Rakchya Upreti; Kathmandu, Nepal	Pratikshya Mahara Chhetri; Rolpa, Nepal	Keshu Khadka; Lalitpur, Nepal	Hotel Yak & Yeti	Kathmandu
2020	Anshika Sharma; Sydney, Australia/ Jhapa, Nepal	Sujita Basnet; Maryland, USA / Kathmandu, Nepal	Nina Kant Mandal; Moscow, Russia / Saptari, Nepal	Dikta Thapa; Chandragiri, Nepal	Nancy Khadka; Biratnagar, Nepal / California, USA	Kathmandu Marriott Hotel	Kathmandu
2019	Pradeepta Adhikari Kathmandu, Nepal	Anushka Shrestha Kathmandu, Nepal	Riya Basnet Kathmandu, Nepal	Meera Kakshapati Bhaktapur, Nepal	Rose Lama Jorpati, Nepal	Laboratory HS School	Kathmandu
2018	Manita Devkota Gorkha, Nepal/ Minnesota, USA	Shrinkhala Khatiwada Hetauda, Nepal	Priya Sigdel Kathmandu, Nepal	Ronali Amatya Kathmandu, Nepal	Mahima Singh Kathmandu, Nepal	Hotel Annapurna	Kathmandu
2017	Nagma Shrestha Kathmandu, Nepal	Nikita Chandak Morang, Nepal	Rojina Shrestha Kathmandu, Nepal	Niti Shah Ghorahi, Nepal	Sahara Basnet Lalitpur, Nepal	Hotel Annapurna	Kathmandu

== Nepal at Miss Universe ==
Year	Representative's Name	District	Title	Placement	Special Awards
2025	Sanya Adhikari	Kathmandu	Miss Universe Nepal 2025	Unplaced	
2024	Sampada Ghimire	Bhaktapur	Miss Universe Nepal 2024	Unplaced	
2023	Jane Dipika Garrett	Kathmandu	Miss Universe Nepal 2023	Top 20	
2022	Sophiya Bhujel	Kathmandu	Miss Universe Nepal 2022	Unplaced	
2021	Sujita Basnet	Kathmandu	Miss Universe Nepal 2021	Unplaced	
2020	Anshika Sharma	Jhapa	Miss Universe Nepal 2020	Unplaced	
2019	Pradeepta Adhikari	Kathmandu	Miss Nepal Universe 2019	Unplaced	
2018	Manita Devkota	Gorkha	Miss Nepal Universe 2018	Top 10	1 Special Awards: National Gift Auction First Prize
2017	Nagma Shrestha	Kathmandu	Miss Nepal Universe 2017	Unplaced	
