= Sophiya Bhujel =

Nepalese model

- Born: Sophiya Bhujel; 1 January 1996 (age 30); Kathmandu, Nepal
- Education: Mount Hermon School, Darjeeling
- Height: 1.73 m (5 ft 8 in)
- Beauty pageant titleholder
- Title: Miss Universe Nepal 2022
- Hair color: Dark Brown
- Eye color: Dark Brown
- Major competitions: Miss Universe Nepal 2022 (Winner); Miss Universe 2022 (Unplaced)

Sophiya Bhujel (Nepali: सोफिया भुजेल) (born 1 January 1996) is a Nepalese beauty pageant titleholder and model who won the Miss Universe Nepal 2022 contest and represented Nepal at Miss Universe 2022.

== Early life ==
Sophiya Bhujel was born in Kathmandu and holds a bachelor's degree in Business Management.

== Pageant career ==
On 9 May 2019, Bhujel entered the silver jubilee edition of Miss Nepal 2019 at age 23. She ended up placing as a Top 7 Finalist at an event held at the Laboratory H.S. School premises in Kirtipur, Nepal. She was appointed to represent Nepal in Global Asian Model the same year. On 21 November 2019, Bhujel competed in the Global Asian Model 2019. She ended up placing as a Top 10 Finalist and an event held at the Cove Theatre inside Okada Manila in Parañaque, Philippines. On 2 March 2022, Bhujel was appointed to represent Nepal internationally in Miss Eco International 2022. At Miss Eco International 2022, on 18 March 2022, she placed in the Top 20 which was their best result since 2019. She participated in and won Miss Universe Nepal 2022 advancing to the Miss Universe competition and winning the title of Social Impact Leader during the pageant.

In an interview, Bhujel expressed that she participated with the goal of achieving her dream of winning Miss Vibhaa, which she has aspired to since her participation in Miss Nepal 2019. Her social advocacy focus is Project RED which is about providing the underprivileged communities and others in Nepal free access to period and menstruation products. She represented Nepal at Miss Universe 2022 in New Orleans, Louisiana, US but did not place.

=== Pageants trivia ===
Competition	Placement	Location	Special Awards	Represented	Date
Miss Nepal 2019	Top 7	Kirtipur, Nepal		Kathmandu	9 May 2019
Global Asian Model 2019	Top 10	Parañaque, Philippines		Nepal	21 November 2019
Miss Eco Nepal 2022	Winner (appointed)	Kathmandu, Nepal		Kathmandu	2 March 2022
Miss Eco International 2022	Top 20	Luxor, Egypt		Nepal	18 March 2022
Miss Universe Nepal 2022	Winner	Kathmandu, Nepal	Social Impact Leader	Kathmandu	25 August 2022
Miss Universe 2022	Unplaced	(United States) New Orleans, Louisiana, US		Nepal	14 January 2023

Awards and achievements
Preceded by Sujita Basnet	Miss Universe Nepal; 2022	Succeeded by Jane Dipika Garrett
