= Miss Nepal 2019 =

24th Miss Nepal/ 3rd Miss Universe Nepal

- Date: 9 May 2019
- Presenters: Sanjya Gupta
- Venue: Laboratory H.S. School premises, Kirtipur, Nepal
- Broadcaster: NTV & NTV PLUS
- Entrants: 26
- Placements: 14
- Miss Universe Nepal: Pradeepta Adhikari; Kathmandu
- Miss Nepal World: Anushka Shrestha; Kathmandu

Hidden Treasures Ruslan FM 95.2 Miss Nepal 2019, the 24th edition of Miss Nepal beauty pageant, was held on 9 May 2019 at Laboratory H.S. premises, Kirtipur, Nepal. Nepalese delegates for Miss Universe 2019, Miss World 2019, Miss Earth 2019, Miss International 2019 and Miss Supranational 2019 were selected.

== Overview ==
The Top 5 winners of 2018 crowned their successors: Miss Nepal Universe 2018 Manita Devkota crowned Pradeepta Adhikari as the Miss Universe Nepal 2019. Miss Nepal World 2018 Shrinkhala Khatiwada crowned Anushka Shrestha as Miss Nepal World 2019. Miss Nepal Earth 2018 Priya Sigdel crowned Riya Basnet as Miss Nepal Earth 2019. Miss Nepal International 2018 Ronali Amatya crowned Meera Kakshapati as Miss Nepal International 2019. Miss Nepal Supranational 2018 Mahima Singh crowned Rose Lama as Miss Nepal Supranational 2019.

In addition, the winners received Rs 100,000 as prize money for winning the title. The auditions of Miss Nepal were held from 13 to 24 March in Birtamode, Birgunj, Butwal, Chitwan, Dhangadhi, Dharan, Nepalgunj, Pokhara and Kathmandu. Regional pageants winners like Miss Pokhara; Miss Purwanchal, Miss Western Nepal and Miss Nepal Oceania 2018 (Anushka Shrestha) were directly qualified for Top 25 of the Miss Nepal 2019 along with one contestant from Livon Wild Card entry. Miss Hong Kong Nepal 2018 (Priya Gurung) was barred from participating due to the age limit.

NTV and NTV PLUS broadcast the pageant live for the Nepalese at home and abroad.

== Results ==
Color keys

- The contestant Won in an International pageant.
- The contestant was a Runner-up in an International pageant.
- The contestant was a Semi-Finalist in an International pageant.
- The contestant assumed another title.
- The contestant was not able to compete in an International pageant.
- The contestant did not place but won a Special Award in the pageant.
- The contestant did not place.

Final results	Contestant	International pageant	International Results
Miss Universe Nepal 2019	Kathmandu - Pradeepta Adhikari	Miss Universe 2019	Unplaced
Miss Nepal World 2019	Kathmandu - Anushka Shrestha	Miss World 2019	Top 12; Head-to-Head Challenge (Round 1 & 2); Beauty with a Purpose; Miss Multimedia
Miss Nepal Earth 2019	Kathmandu - Riya Basnet (●)	Miss Earth 2019	Unplaced
Miss Nepal International 2019	(Nepal) Bhaktapur - Meera Kakshapati	Miss International 2019	Unplaced
Miss Nepal Supranational 2019	(Nepal) Jorpati - Rose Lama	Miss Supranational 2019	Unplaced; Top 10 - Supra Fan Vote; Top 16 - Supra Chat with Valeria
Top 7	Kathmandu – Rakshya Upreti	Miss Eco International 2023	Top 21
Top 7	Kathmandu – Sophiya Bhujel	Miss Universe 2022	Unplaced
Top 14	Kathmandu – Nisha Pathak	Miss Grand International 2019	Unplaced
Top 14	(Nepal) Bhairahawa – Shiwani Ghimire		
Top 14	(Nepal) Chitwan – Nancy Bogati		
Top 14	Kathmandu – Jenny Maharjan		
Top 14	Kathmandu – Pratha Adhikari		
Top 14	(Nepal) Lalitpur – Nikita Karmacharya		
Top 14	(Nepal) Lalitpur – Suveksha Adhikari		

(●): The candidate is the winner of Miss Popular Choice (online voting) and got direct entry into Top 14 semi-Finalists.

=== Sub-titles ===
Award	Contestant
Miss Athletic	Kathmandu – Pradeepta Adhikari
Beauty with a Purpose	(Nepal) Lalitpur - Nikita Karmacharya
Miss Confident	Kathmandu - Nisha Pathak
The Kathmandu Post Miss Intellect	Kathmandu - Anushka Shrestha
Miss Talent	Kathmandu - Pradeepta Adhikari
Shree Ganapati Jewellers Miss Photogenic	(Nepal) Jorpati - Rose Lama
Yamaha Face of Fascino	Kathmandu - Anushka Shrestha
Miss Friendship	(Nepal) Chitwan - Nancy Bogati
Berger Miss Glamour	(Nepal) Jorpati - Rose Lama
Bip Miss Popular Choice	Kathmandu - Riya Basnet
Miss Best Natural Skin	Kathmandu - Jenny Maharjan

=== Contestants ===
#	Contestants	Age	Height	Home Town	Education
1	Nisha Pathak	22	5 ft 4 in (1.63 m)	Kathmandu, Kathmandu District	BBA
2	Alisha Joshi	23	5 ft 4 in (1.63 m)	Pokhara, Kaski District	BBA
3	Sophiya Bhujel	23	5 ft 8 in (1.73 m)	Kathmandu, Kathmandu District	BBM
4	Riya Basnet	22	5 ft 8.5 in (1.74 m)	Kathmandu, Kathmandu District	BBA
5	Sanskriti Ghimire	23	5 ft 4 in (1.63 m)	Bhairahawa, Rupandehi District	B.Sc
6	Anushka Shrestha	23	5 ft 5 in (1.65 m)	Kathmandu, Kathmandu District	BA in Commerce
7	Jenny Maharjan	24	5 ft 5 in (1.65 m)	Kathmandu, Kathmandu District	B.Pharm.
8	Ashmita Maharjan	22	5 ft 5.5 in (1.66 m)	Lalitpur, Lalitpur District	BE computer
9	Kiran Thapa	22	5 ft 5.4 in (1.66 m)	Bauddha, Kathmandu District	B.Arch(pursuing)
10	Pradeepta Adhikari	23	5 ft 6.5 in (1.69 m)	Kathmandu, Kathmandu District	MBBS(3rd Year)
11	Nikita Karmacharya	21	5 ft 5 in (1.65 m)	Lalitpur, Lalitpur District	BSW
12	Rose Lama	20	5 ft 7 in (1.70 m)	Jorpati, Kathmandu District	TBD
13	Sara Bajimaya	23	5 ft 8 in (1.73 m)	Pokhara, Kaski District	Master's in Microbiology
14	Laxmi Raut	23	5 ft 6.7 in (1.69 m)	Hattiban Lalitpur, Lalitpur District	MBA
15	Rakshya Upreti	22	5 ft 6.5 in (1.69 m)	Purano Baneshwor, Kathmandu District	Bio-Technology
16	Meera Kakshapati	23	5 ft 4 in (1.63 m)	Bhaktapur, Bhaktapur District	BBS
17	Jenisha Thapaliya	23	5 ft 5.4 in (1.66 m)	Morang, Morang District	M.Ec(pursuing)
18	Pooja Shrestha	22	5 ft 4.5 in (1.64 m)	Bhadrapur, Jhapa District	BBA
19	Bipana Subedi	20	5 ft 5.5 in (1.66 m)	Chitwan District	BSc in Forestry
20	Suveksha Adhikari	21	5 ft 4 in (1.63 m)	Lalitpur, Lalitpur District	BBA(pursuing)
21	Prakriti Katwal	24	5 ft 5 in (1.65 m)	Birtamod, Jhapa District	MBBS 5th year
22	Nancy Bogati	24	5 ft 4 in (1.63 m)	Chitwan District	B. E. Computer
23	Shiwani Ghimire	21	5 ft 5.5 in (1.66 m)	Bhairahawa, Rupandehi District	B.E Computer
24	Santwana Malakar	22	5 ft 6 in (1.68 m)	Kathmandu, Kathmandu District	B. Architect
25	Pratha Adhikari	23	5 ft 6 in (1.68 m)	Kathmandu, Kathmandu District	BBM

(●) The winner of NMag Miss Popular Choice (online voting) got direct entry in Top 15 Semi-Finalists.

== Previous Experience ==
- (#) Anushka Shrestha is the winner of Miss Nepal Oceania 2018 and she got a direct entry to Miss Nepal 2019.
- (#) Sara Bajimaya is Miss Pokhara 2018 and got a direct entry to Miss Nepal 2019.
- (#) Pooja Shrestha is Miss Purwanchal 2018 and she got a direct entry to Miss Nepal 2019.
- (#) Shiwani Ghimire is the winner of Miss Western Nepal 2018 and she got a direct entry to Miss Nepal 2019.
- (#) Rose Lama was Miss Nepal California 2017.
- (#) Nisha Pathak is the Winner of the Pageant Miss Global International 2014, which was held in Kathmandu, Nepal. She also bagged the Miss Discipline title at the event. Besides, she represented Nepal at the Miss Heritage International 2015 pageant held in New Delhi, India. She was one of the top 5 winners at the event.
