= Boniya =

Bauniya बौनिया
- Village development committee
- Location in Nepal
- Coordinates: 28.61°N 81.04°E
- Country: Nepal
- Province: Sudurpashchim Province
- District: Kailali District

Population (1991)
  - Total: 9,263
- Time zone: UTC+5:45 (Nepal Time)

Boniya is a village development committee lies in Joshipur Rural Municipality in Kailali District in Sudurpashchim Province of western Nepal. At the time of the 1991 Nepal census it had a population of 9263 living in 1211 individual households.
