= Miss Vibhaa =

Deemed to be Miss Vibhaa International Pageant

Miss Vibhaa Organization
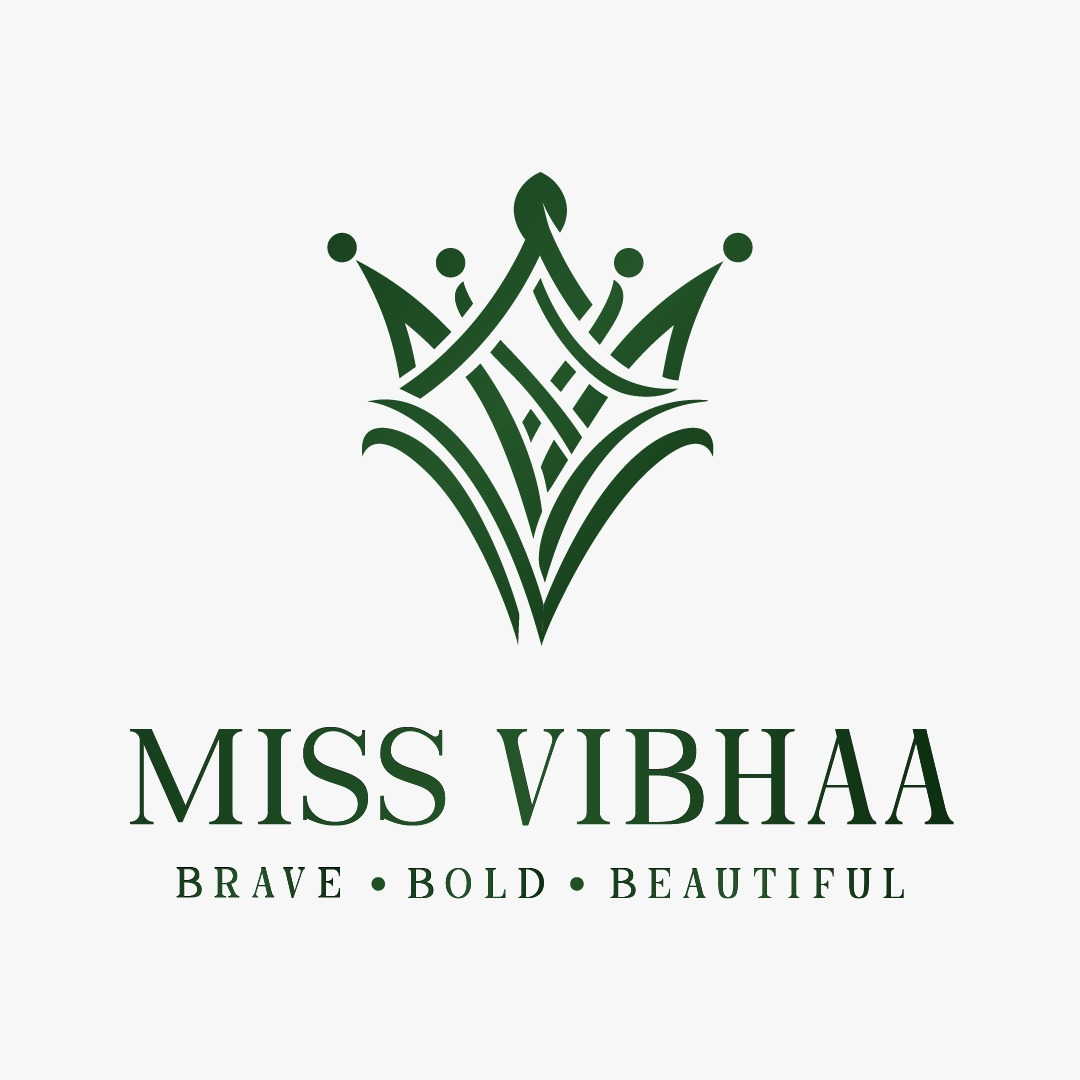
- Formation: 2024
- Founded at: Nepal
- Type: Deemed to be International Pageant
- Purpose: Beauty pageant
- Headquarters: Kathmandu
- Location: Nepal
- Region served: South Asia
- Official language: Nepali and English
- Chairman: Uddhab Adhikari
- Parent organization: Umanga Creation Pvt. Lt.

Miss Vibhaa (/mɪs vɪˈbʱɑː/) (vibhaa (Sanskrit for 'bright')) is an annual beauty pageant found in 2024 in Nepal, which is deemed to be an international pageant.

== Pageant Background ==
Miss Vibhaa by Umanga Creation Pvt. Ltd. was started as national pageant for Miss Grand Nepal since 2023. Later, it added franchise of Miss Cosmo Nepal 2024. In early 2025, Miss Vibhaa relinquished the Miss Cosmo Franchise. In November 2026, the organization announced the plans of upgrading the pageant into an international contest titled Miss Vibhaa.

== Pageant Format ==
The actual contest of Miss Vibhaa begins with a press conference to announce registration period that lasts for a month. Contestants can register themselves virtually, via apps assigned by Miss Vibhaa Organization. After the registration ends, the quarter finalists or qualifiers are announced on social media platforms of Miss Vibhaa, based on the credentials on application form. The qualifiers may be 60–100 in number, then they are required to perform in Task-1: Q/A round, and Task-2: Swimsuit Round, which are conducted virtually and live streamed on YouTube.

Then, the qualifiers are reduced to semi-finalists (Top 30 or more) based on their performance in the two tasks. The semi-finalists are again reduced to finalists (normally 15 to 22), based on internal evaluation. The finalists are introduced to public in a 'Press Presentation' segment where the finalists give an introductory speech. The Press Presentation may be accompanied with Sash Ceremony or Crown Unveiling or any sponsor event as required. After the press presentation, the finalists undergo a closed camp where they are trained on walk, communication skills, social impact projects, etiquette and stage presence. The finalists also perform in Swimsuit Competition and Closed Door Interviews as a part of preliminary competition.

At the Grand Finale, Top 10 is selected based on the preliminary competition and public votes. The Top 10 performs in several runway walk round, speech rounds before getting reduced to Top 5. The Top 5 debates on a common question based on which the winner of Miss Vibhaa is announced. The winner is designated to represent Nepal in an international pageant as assigned by Miss Vibhaa selection committee. The format can be modified or revamped by the organizer according to the need of time.

== Past Works ==
=== Miss Vibhaa for Miss Grand Nepal (2024-2026) ===
Franchise History
| Membership | Year |
|---|---|
| Miss Grand International | 2023–present |
| Miss Cosmo | 2024 |

Miss Vibhaa started as national pageant for Miss Grand Nepal and Miss Cosmo Nepal as indicated by following details.

| Year | Miss Vibhaa Title | Titleholder | Runners Up | | | | Venue | Entrants | Date |
|---|---|---|---|---|---|---|---|---|---|
| 2026 | Miss Vibhaa Grand 2026 | Sumnima Puri | No Runner up | | | | NOVA Club, Kathmandu | _ | July 26, 2026 |
| 2025 | Miss Vibhaa Grand 2025 | Jessica Singh Thakuri (Resigned) | Nishita Joshi | Nisha Shrestha | Aashma Rijal | Teena Pariyar | Hotel Yak and Yeti, Kathmandu | 16 | August 27, 2025 |
| 2024 | Miss Vibhaa Grand 2024 | Prema Lamgade | Aakriti Kunwar | Shiseka Subba | Sanju KC | Riya Maharjan | Heritage Garden, Sanepa | 16 | September 11, 2024 |
| 2024 | Miss Vibhaa Cosmo 2024 | Nimita Regmi | Aakriti Kunwar | Shiseka Subba | Sanju KC | Riya Maharjan | Hotel Aloft Kathmandu | - | - |
| Later 2023 | Miss Vibhaa Grand 2023 | Garima Ghimire | Appointed, Miss Universe Nepal 2023- 1st Runner Up | | | | - | - | - |

==== 2025 Edition ====
The 2nd edition was held on 27 August, 2025 at Hotel Yak and Yeti, Kathmandu and won by Jessica Singh Thakuri and competed at Miss Grand International 2025. In early 2026, Thakuri resigned from her position as Miss Vibhaa Grand.

| Placement | Contestant Number- Contestant | Subtitle |
|---|---|---|
| Miss Vibhaa Grand 2025 | 4- Jessica Singh Thakuri(Resigned) | Miss Beautiful Skin; Best in Evening Gown |
| Top 5 | 13- Nishita Joshi | |
| Top 5 | 3- Nisha Shrestha | Miss Best Makeup Look |
| Top 5 | 1- Aashma Rijal | Miss ICT Award |
| Top 5 | 11- Teena Pariyar | Best in Swimsuit Award |
| Top 16 | 2- Ashmi Shrestha | |
| Top 16 | 5- Veronica Miachel Gurung | |
| Top 16 | 6- Smriti Chaudhary | |
| Top 16 | 7- Cezal Gautam | |
| Top 16 | 8- Aliza Chaudhary | |
| Top 16 | 9- Gajal Karn | |
| Top 16 | 10- Akriti Ghimire | Miss Eco Queen |
| Top 16 | 12- Prena Xettri | |
| Top 16 | 14- Sapna Bhandari | |
| Top 16 | 15- Rabiya Nagarkoti | |
| Top 16 | 16- Smarika Karki | |

==== 2024 Edition ====
The first edition was held on 11 September, 2024 at Heritage Garden, Sanepa, Lalitpur and won by Prema Lamgade of Bhairahawa and went to Miss Grand International 2024. Also, Nimita Regmi represented Nepal at Miss Cosmo 2024.

Top 16 Contestants
| Placement | Contestant Number- Contestant | Subtitle |
|---|---|---|
| Miss Vibhaa Grand 2024 | 10- Prema Lamgade | Miss Fitness; Best in Evening Gown |
| Miss Vibhaa Cosmo 2024 | Appointed- Nimita Regmi | |
| Top 5 | 13- Aakriti Kunwar | Best in Swimsuit |
| Top 5 | 4- Shisheka Subba | Miss Photogenic |
| Top 5 | 5- Riya Maharjan | Social Influence Award |
| Top 5 | 3- Sanju KC | Top Model Award |
| Top 16 | 1- Jenita Century | |
| Top 16 | 2- Sudhira Yadav | |
| Top 16 | 6- Priya Maharjan | |
| Top 16 | 7- Krishala Gurung | |
| Top 16 | 8- Rinsa Shakya | Nepal Telecom Miss ICT |
| Top 16 | 9- Jyoti Khadka | Oriflame Best Skin |
| Top 16 | 11- Bina Maharjan | |
| Top 16 | 12- Preksha Joshi | |
| Top 16 | 14- Kajal Thakur | |
| Top 16 | 15- Asmita Shah | |
| Top 16 | 16- Mimosha Rai | |

==== International placements ====
Miss Grand International (2023-present)

| Year | Representative | District/ City | Placement | Special Awards | Ref. |
|---|---|---|---|---|---|
| 2026 | Sumnima Puri | Birendranagar | TBA | Best National Costume- Top 15 Country's Power of the Year- Top 40 | |
| 2024 | Prema Lamgade | Bhairahawa | Unplaced | Grand Voice 2024- Top 30 | |
| 2023 | Garima Ghimire | Biratnagar | Unplaced | | |

Miss Cosmo (2024)

The pageant is now under THT Miss Nepal since 2025.

| Year | Miss Cosmo Nepal | District | Placement | Special Awards | Ref. |
|---|---|---|---|---|---|
| 2024 | Nimita Regmi | Achham | Unplaced | None | |
