= Pradeepta Adhikari =

Nepalese beauty contestant

- Born: Pradeepta Adhikari; January 25, 1997 (age 29); Kathmandu, Nepal
- Education: Nepalese Army Institute of Health Sciences
- Height: 1.66 m (5 ft 5 in)
- Beauty pageant titleholder
- Title: Miss Nepal Universe 2019
- Hair color: Black
- Eye color: Black
- Major competitions: Miss Universe Nepal 2019; Miss Talent; Miss Athletic; Miss Universe 2019; (Unplaced)

Pradeepta Adhikari (Nepali: प्रदीप्ता अधिकारी) (born January 25, 1997) is a Nepalese model and beauty pageant winner who was crowned Miss Universe Nepal 2019.

She has represented her country in international debate competitions held in the Netherlands, Singapore, and Thailand.

== Life and career ==
=== Early life ===
Pradeepta Adhikari was born and raised in the Nepalese capital Kathmandu. A medical student at Nepalese Army Institute of Health Sciences, she was set to graduate in 2022 with an MBBS degree. In 2018, she was also crowned as Miss Nepalese Army Institute of Health Sciences. She speaks 5 languages.

=== Pageantry ===
On 9 May 2019, Adhikari entered the Miss Nepal 2019 pageant as Candidate #10 and won the pageant. She was officially crowned as Miss Universe Nepal with the subtitles of Miss Athletic and Miss Talent.

She represented Nepal at the Miss Universe 2019 pageant in Atlanta, Georgia with her advocacy project 'Healthcare for All'. She showcased her national costume inspired by goddess Vajrayogini.

Awards and achievements
Preceded by Manita Devkota	Miss Universe Nepal; 2019	Succeeded by Anshika Sharma
