= Miss Nepal 2003 =

- Date: September 13, 2003
- Presenters: Namrata Shrestha.
- Venue: Birendra International Conference Convention Centre, Kathmandu
- Broadcaster: NTV
- Entrants: 16
- Winner: Priti Sitoula; Kathmandu

Dabur Vatika Miss Nepal 2003, the 9th Miss Nepal beauty contest, was held on September 13, 2003, at the Birendra International Conference Convention Centre in Nepal. It was won by Priti Sitoula, of Kathmandu.

The show was broadcast live by Nepal Television but suffered from minor technical glitches.

The contestants were supported by fashion designer groups INIFD, NEFT, Lakhotia and others. The event differed from previous pageants in that it featured modifications of Nepal's traditional ethnic dresses. Designs from INIFD (International Institute of Fashion Design) were judged to be better than the dresses from competing designers.

Namrata Shrestha hosted the show. The Winner of Miss Nepal 2003, Priti Sitoula, represented Nepal in the Miss World 2003 pageant in Sanya, China. The 1st runner up, Prerana Shah, represented Nepal in the Miss Asia Pacific 2003.

== Results ==
Color keys

- The contestant Won in an International pageant.
- The contestant was a Runner-up in an International pageant.
- The contestant was a Semi-Finalist in an International pageant.
- The contestant assumed another title.
- The contestant was not able to compete in an International pageant.
- The contestant did not place but won a Special Award in the pageant.
- The contestant did not place.

Final results	Contestant	International pageant	International Results
Miss Nepal 2003 (Winner)	Kathmandu - Priti Sitoula	Miss World 2003	Unplaced
1st runner-up (Miss Asia Pacific Nepal 2003)	Kathmandu - Prerana Shah	Miss Asia Pacific 2003	Top 10
World Miss University Nepal 2003	(Nepal) Lalitpur - Ayusha Shrestha	World Miss University 2003	World Miss University 2003
2nd runner-up	(Nepal) Lalitpur - Numa Rai		
Top 5	Kathmandu – Ramani Joshi		
Top 5	Kathmandu – Rupa Upadhyay		

=== Sub-Titles ===
Award	Contestant
Miss Personality	Kathmandu - Prerana Shah
Miss Photogenic	Kathmandu - Rupa Upadhyay
Miss Natural Talent	Kathmandu - Rupa Upadhyay
Miss Best Dress	(Nepal) Pokhara - Sheila Rani Gurung

== Judges ==
- Mrs Chhaua Sharma - Founder/ Director of Nepal College of Travel & Tourism
- Mr Narayan P. Sharma - Principal, Budhanilkantha School
- Mrs Niru Shrestha - Miss Nepal 1998
- Mrs Reetu Simha - Managing Director, Aama Group of Companies
- Mr Siddhartha SJB Rana - Chairman, Soaltee Group (P) Ltd
- Ms Sanyukta Shrestha - Managing Director, The Signature Style Boutique
- Mr Sushil Pant - Executive Director, Jurist & co (P) Ltd
- Mrs Anjan Shakya - Lecture, Padma Kanya Campus
- Mr Arun Kumar K.C - Managing Director, Cotton Comfort (P) Ltd
- Mr Diwaker Rajkarnikar - President, Nepal cancer Relief Society
- Mr Narendra Bhattarai - President, Nepal Bankers Association

== Contestants ==
#	Contestants	Age	Height	Hometown	Placement
1	Saru Subedi	21	1.65 m (5 ft 5 in)	Bhaktapur	
2	Smita Pandey	21	1.70 m (5 ft 7 in)	Lalitpur	
3	Priti Sitoula	22	1.68 m (5 ft 6 in)	Kathmandu	Winner
4	Prativa Moktan	19	1.68 m (5 ft 6 in)	Kathmandu	
5	Bidisha Manandhar	21	1.73 m (5 ft 8 in)	Kathmandu	
6	Sumika Bajracharya	20	1.65 m (5 ft 5 in)	Kathmandu	
7	Ramani Joshi	20	1.78 m (5 ft 10 in)	Kathmandu	4th Runner Up
8	Neha Singh	23	1.68 m (5 ft 6 in)	Narayani	
9	Sumitra Karmacharya	20	1.65 m (5 ft 5 in)	Bhaktapur	
10	Soni Khadka	19	1.68 m (5 ft 6 in)	Kathmandu	
11	Prerana Shah	20	1.83 m (6 ft 0 in)	Kathmandu	1st Runner Up; Miss Personality
12	Kalpana Siwakoti	22	1.70 m (5 ft 7 in)	Kathmandu	
13	Sima Gurung	20	1.65 m (5 ft 5 in)	Pokhara	
14	Sheila Rani Gurung	19	1.68 m (5 ft 6 in)	Pokhara	Miss Best Dress
15	Rupa Upadhyay	18	1.68 m (5 ft 6 in)	Kathmandu	3rd Runner Up; Miss Talent; Miss Photogenic
16	Numa Rai	20	1.68 m (5 ft 6 in)	Lalitpur	2nd Runner Up

== Notes ==
- Contestant #11, Prerana Shah was crowned as the 2nd runner up in Miss Teen Nepal 2002.
