= Khusbu Oli =

Nepalese politician and model

Honourable Khusbu Oli
- खुस्बु ओली

Member of Parliament, Pratinidhi Sabha
- Incumbent
- Assumed office 26 March 2026
- Constituency: PR list

Personal details
- Born: 15 September 1990 (age 36) Surunga, Jhapa District, Nepal
- Party: Rastriya Prajatantra Party
- Spouse: Santosh Karki (m. 2016)
- Parents: Shyam Sundar Oli (father); Shakuntala Oli (mother)
- Education: University of Oxford (Political Science)
- Profession: Politician; Model; Social Worker
- Beauty pageant titleholder
- Title: Little Lady 2000; Miss Teen 2006
- Hair color: Black
- Eye color: Dark Brown
- Major competitions: Miss Indigenous 2019; (Winner); Miss Teen Nepal 2006; (Winner)

Khusbu Oli (Nepali: खुस्बु ओली; born 15 September 1990) is a Nepalese politician, social worker, former model, and beauty pageant titleholder who serves as a member of parliament (MP) from the Rastriya Prajatantra Party (RPP). She is also known for her involvement in the development sector, her modeling career, and her participation in several music videos.

== Early life and education ==
Khusbu Oli studied Political science at the University of Oxford in the United Kingdom. She won the “Little Lady Champion” title in a competition organized by Kathmandu Jaycees in 2000 and later won the Miss Teen Nepal title in 2006. Following her success in beauty pageants, she became involved in modeling, social service activities, and also appeared in several music videos. Khusbu later worked in the development sector for over a decade and also served as a central trainer for the Rastriya Prajatantra Party (RPP).

== Political career ==
Oli was elected to the Pratinidhi Sabha from Rastriya Prajatantra Party at the 2026 general election. She was elected from the party list under the Khas Arya female cluster. She took her oath in Sanskrit language during the parliamentary oath-taking ceremony held at Parliament of Nepal on 2 April 2026. She was appointed as the chief whip of the party at the 7th House of Representatives.

== Personal life ==
Khusbu Oli was born on September 15, 1990, in Surunga, Jhapa district, into a Khas Brahmin family to father Shyam Sundar Oli and mother Shakuntala Oli. She identifies herself as a Hindu and supports the monarchy and the concept of a Hindu kingship in Nepal. She is married to businessman, Santosh Karki in 2016.

== See also ==
- Miss Teen Nepal
