= Anshika Sharma =

Nepalese beauty contestant born in 1996

- अंशिका शर्मा
- Born: Anshika Sharma; July 11, 1996 (age 30); Jhapa, Nepal
- Education: Central Queensland University
- Height: 1.78 m (5 ft 10 in)
- Beauty pageant titleholder
- Title: Miss Universe Nepal 2020
- Hair color: Dark brown
- Eye color: Black
- Major competitions: Miss Nepal Oceania 2020; Miss Popular Choice; Miss Universe Nepal 2020; Miss Fierce; Miss Universe 2020; (Unplaced)
- Website: anshikaewf.org

Anshika Sharma (Nepali: अंशिका शर्मा) (born July 11, 1996) is a Nepalese beauty pageant titleholder who was crowned Miss Universe Nepal 2020. She represented Nepal at Miss Universe 2020. She worked as a sales analyst and was the runner-up at Miss Nepal Oceania 2020.

== Life and career ==
=== Early life ===
Anshika Sharma was born in Jhapa and raised in Kathmandu by her parents, Balkrishna and Mala Sharma. She worked a sales analyst and dancer. She also has an interest in photography. After graduating high school in Kathmandu, she moved to Sydney, Australia, for her higher education. Sharma financed her education and completed her bachelor's degree in Informational Technology from Central Queensland University, after which she worked as a sales/business analyst for DHL.

=== Pageantry ===
On March 14, 2020, Sharma entered a major regional pageant called Miss Nepal Oceania 2020 Pageant. She was the fourth candidate in the competition. Sharma was the runner-up in the competition and was awarded the title of Miss Popular Choice during the coronation night held at the Orion Function Center in Sydney. Later that year, she competed in Miss Universe Nepal 2020 and won the pageant. In an interview, she said that "regardless of the titles, those were moments of pride, as she was representing Nepal on international platforms." During the pageant, she won the title of Miss Fierce. She represented Nepal at Miss Universe 2020 in Hollywood, Florida.

=== Charity Work ===
Sharma is one of the founders of the non-profit organization Anshika Education Welfare Foundation (AEWF), which supports underprivileged children from minority groups and orphanages in rural communities of Nepal. The foundation supports children financially and provides school fees, clothes, study materials, food, accommodation, travel, and pay their medical expenses. The organization also focuses on supporting girls and handling their health-related issues.

=== Modeling ===
After Miss Universe Nepal she shifted in New York City and works as a model. She has walked in New Work Fashion Week 2023 for Bhibumohohapatra.

Awards and achievements
Preceded by Pradeepta Adhikari	Miss Universe Nepal; 2020	Succeeded by Sujita Basnet
