= Nimita Regmi =

Nepalese beauty pageant titleholder and Architect

- Born: January 4, 2000 (age 26)
- Height: 5.15 ft (157 cm)
- Beauty pageant titleholder
- Title: Miss Cosmo Nepal 2024
- Hair color: Black
- Eye colour: Black
- Major competitions: Miss Cosmo 2024 (Unplaced) Miss Vibhaa Cosmo 2024 Miss Supranational Nepal 2024 (Top 19)

Nimita Regmi (Nepali: निमिता रेग्मी) is a Nepalese beauty pageant titleholder, architect and Miss Vibhaa Cosmo 2024 who represented her country at Miss Cosmo 2024.

== Life and career ==
Nimita Regmi was born in the year 2000. Her permanent residence is at Achham, Nepal and currently she lives in Kathmandu. She is an architect by profession and graduated from Cosmos Engineering College, Kathmandu.

She is also involved in charity and has been working with charitable organization called Juneli Foundation, that works on providing education, opportunities and inclusivity for disabled children. She has also achieved the Superstructure Award 2022 with her project "Future Classroom". She participated in Miss Supranational Nepal 2024 and placed at Top 19. Later, she won the title Miss Vibhaa Cosmo 2024.

== Pageantry ==
Regmi's first national pageant was Miss Supranational Nepal 2024 (Miss National Nepal) organized by Sanurvi International. Later, she won the title of Miss Vibhaa Cosmo 2024.

Pageant Trivia
Year	Competition	Results	Ref.
2024	Miss Supranational Nepal	Top 19	
2024	Miss Vibhaa	Miss Vibhaa Cosmo 2024	
2024	Miss Cosmo	Unplaced	
