= Miss World Puerto Rico 2022 =

Beauty pageant

- Date: June 30, 2022
- Presenters: Danilo Beauchamp; Génesis Dávila; Wilnelia Merced Cruz, Lady Forsyth-Johnson
- Entertainment: Jven; La W
- Venue: Centro de Bellas Artes de Caguas, Caguas, Puerto Rico
- Broadcaster: Mega TV; Facebook; YouTube
- Entrants: 31
- Placements: 16
- Winner: Elena Rivera; Toa Baja

Miss World Puerto Rico 2022 was the 47th Miss World Puerto Rico pageant, held at the Centro de Bellas Artes de Caguas in Caguas, Puerto Rico, on June 30, 2022.

Aryam Díaz Rosado of Naranjito crowned Elena Rivera of Toa Baja as her successor at the end of the event. Rivera represented Puerto Rico at Miss World 2023 and finished as one of the top forty semifinalists.

== Results ==
=== Placements ===
Placement	Contestant
Miss World Puerto Rico 2022	Toa Baja – Elena Rivera
1st Runner-Up	Lares – Andrea Carolina Rivera
2nd Runner-Up	Río Grande – Amanda Pérez Solís
Top 7	Carolina – Yamirelis Carrasquillo; Dorado – Juliana Hernández; Luquillo – Mariela Pepin Solis; Orocovis – Laura Sofía Rivera
Top 16	Arecibo – Tiffany González; Cidra – Alondra de Jesús; Guaynabo – Yovielys Rodríguez; Hatillo – Estefanía Lugo; Jayuya – Mariely Colón; Manatí – Jeandra Ventura; Salinas – Skylene Correa; San Germán – Pamela Marie Ramos; Trujillo Alto – Michelle Valentín

=== Challenges ===
==== Beauty With a Purpose ====
Result	Contestant
Winner	Hatillo – Estefanía Lugo
Top 5	Carolina – Yamirelis Carrasquillo; Lares – Andrea Carolina Rivera; Maricao – Jeanelys Nicole Morales; Utuado – Norgianne Rivera

==== Best Body ====
Result	Contestant
Winner	Luquillo – Mariela Pepin Solis
Top 7	Carolina – Yamirelis Carrasquillo; Manatí – Jeandra Ventura; Orocovis – Laura Sofía Rivera; Ponce – Joandra Miranda; San Juan – Karla Raquel Rodríguez; Toa Baja – Elena Rivera

==== Head to Head Challenge ====
Result	Contestant
Winner	Carolina – Yamirelis Carrasquillo
Top 7	Arecibo – Tiffany González; Coamo – Dashira Jailet Rivera; Lares – Andrea Carolina Rivera; Maricao – Jeanelys Nicole Morales; Río Grande – Amanda Pérez Solís; Trujillo Alto – Michelle Valentín

==== Sports ====
Result	Contestant
Winner	Guaynabo – Yovielys Rodríguez
Top 5	Dorado – Juliana Hernández; Fajardo – Joselyn Nohely Coronel; Luquillo – Mariela Pepin Solis; Manatí – Jeandra Ventura

==== Talent ====
Result	Contestant
Winner	Río Grande – Amanda Pérez Solís
Top 10	Canóvanas – Gabriela Santana; Cidra – Alondra de Jesús; Dorado – Juliana Hernández; Hatillo – Estefanía Lugo; Humacao – Graciela Colón; Manatí – Jeandra Ventura; Ponce – Joandra Miranda; San Juan – Karla Raquel Rodríguez; Trujillo Alto – Michelle Valentín

==== Top Model ====
Result	Contestant
Winner	Toa Baja – Elena Rivera
Top 9	Arecibo – Tiffany González; Fajardo – Joselyn Nohely Coronel; Hatillo – Estefanía Lugo; Jayuya – Mariely Colón; Lares – Andrea Carolina Rivera; Orocovis – Laura Sofía Rivera; Rincón – Nelly Angelis Sánchez; Río Grande – Amanda Pérez Solís

== Contestants ==
Official 31 candidates of Miss World Puerto Rico 2022:

Municipality	Contestant
Arecibo	Tiffany González Feliciano
Bayamón	Allison L. Ojeda
Caguas	Melody Matos
Camuy	Lizmari Nieves
Canóvanas	Gabriela Santana Quiñones
Carolina	Yamirelis Carrasquillo
Cidra	Alondra de Jesús
Coamo	Dashira Jailet Rivera
Dorado	Juliana Hernández
Fajardo	Joselyn Nohely Coronel
Guaynabo	Yovielys Rodríguez Román
Hatillo	Estefanía Lugo Carrión
Humacao	Graciela Colón Camuñas
Jayuya	Mariely Colón
Lares	Andrea Carolina Rivera
Luquillo	Mariela Pepin Solis
Manatí	Jeandra Ventura
Maricao	Jeanelys Nicole Morales
Orocovis	Laura Sofía Rivera
Ponce	Joandra Miranda
Quebradillas	Alaina Desireé López
Rincón	Nelly Angelis Sánchez
Río Grande	Amanda Paola Pérez Solís
Salinas	Skylene Correa
San Germán	Pamela Marie Ramos
San Juan	Karla Raquel Rodríguez
Santa Isabel	Emily Gabriela Meléndez
Toa Baja	Elena Rivera
Trujillo Alto	Michelle Valentín
Utuado	Norgianne Rivera
Vega Alta	Nicole Díaz

== Crossovers ==
Miss USA

- 2019: (Luquillo, Puerto Rico) Luquillo – Mariela Pepin Solis (as Maryland; Top 10)

Miss World America

- 2017: (Luquillo, Puerto Rico) Luquillo – Mariela Pepin Solis (as Maryland; Top 10)

Miss Teen USA

- 2014: (Luquillo, Puerto Rico) Luquillo – Mariela Pepin Solis (as Maryland)
