= Miss Nepal 2012 =

Beauty pageant edition

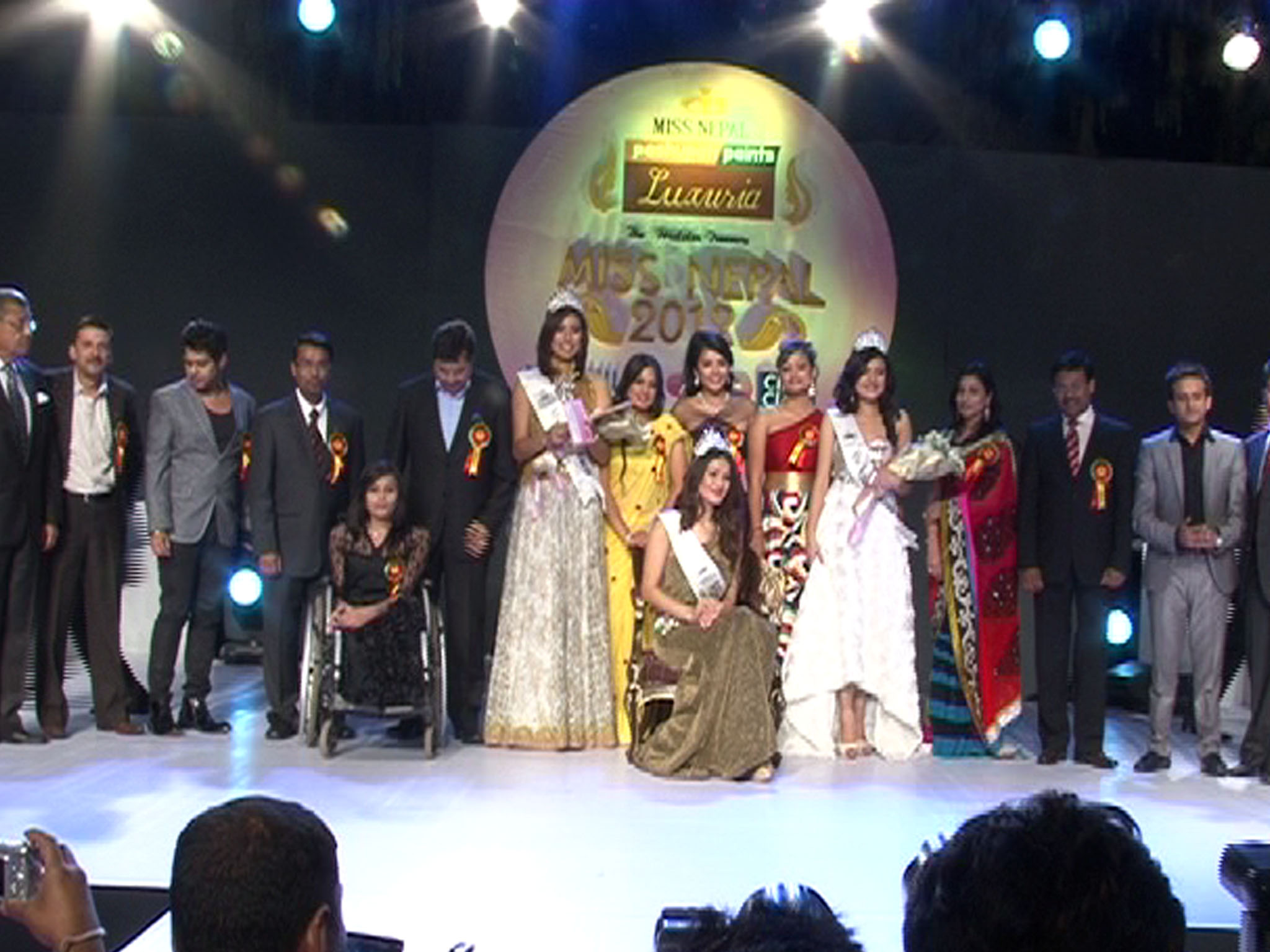
- Date: May 6, 2012
- Venue: Hotel Del Annapurna, Kathmandu
- Broadcaster: NTV
- Entrants: 16
- Winner: Shristi Shrestha; Cornwall

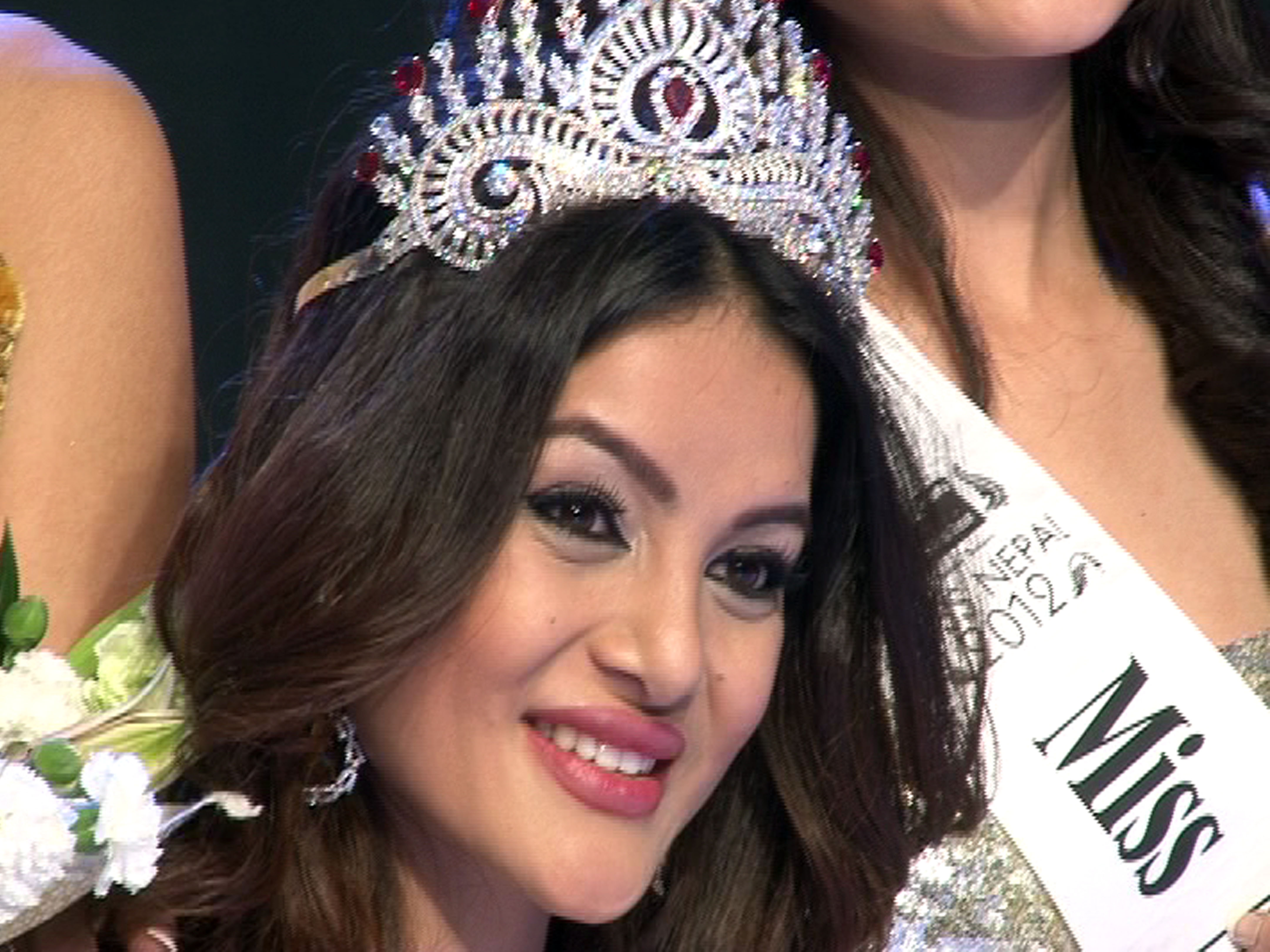
Shristi Shrestha after crowned as Miss Nepal 2012

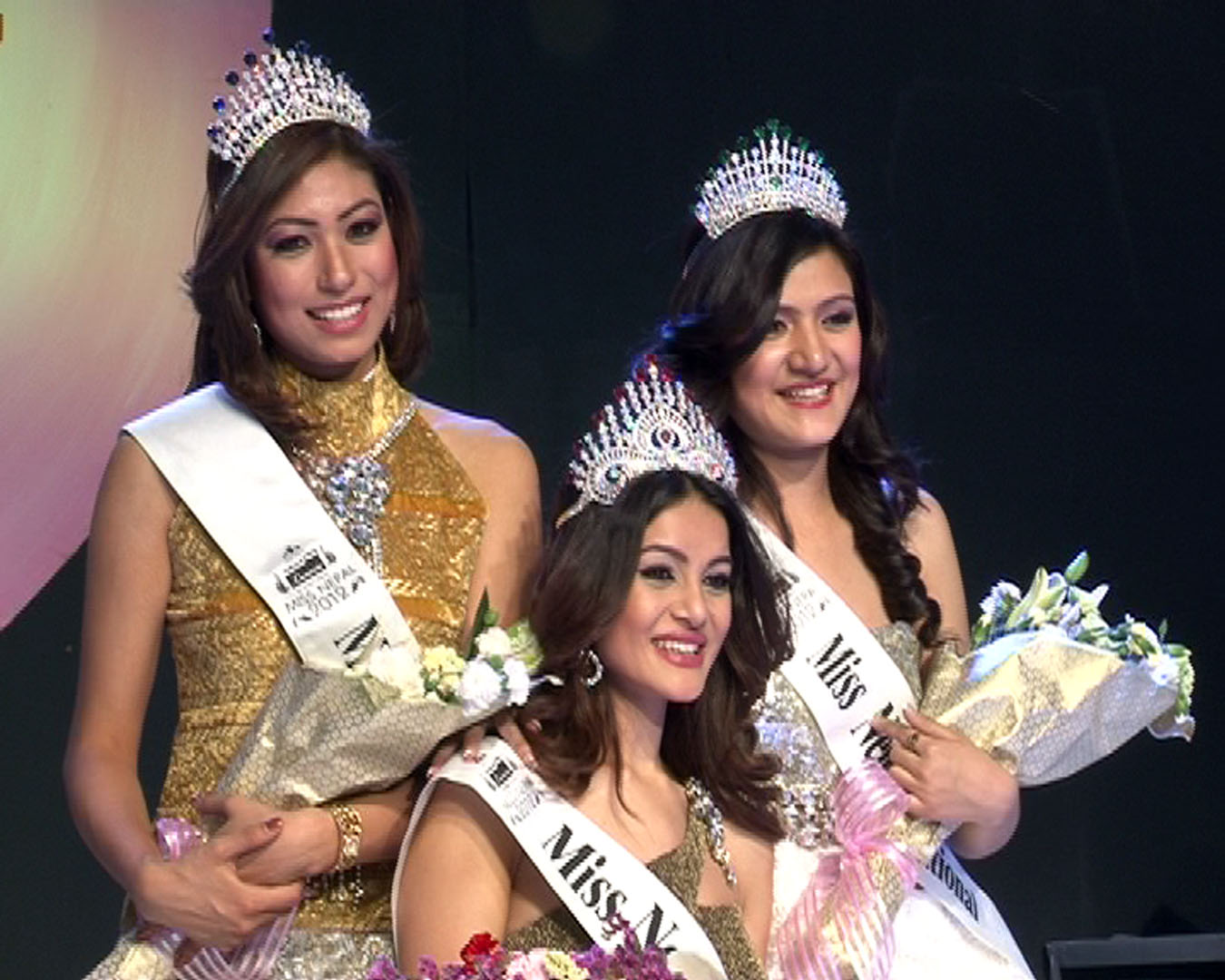
Top 3 contestant

Hidden Treasures Miss Nepal 2012, the 16th Miss Nepal beauty pageant, was held on May 6, 2012 at the Hotel Del Annapurna in Kathmandu. Miss Nepal 2011 Malina Joshi crowned Shristi Shrestha as Miss Nepal World 2012, who represented Nepal at Miss World 2012 with Nagma Shrestha and Subekshya Khadka crowned as Miss Nepal Earth 2012 and Miss Nepal International 2012 who went to Miss Earth 2012 and Miss International 2012 respectively.

The 16 shortlisted young women aged 19 years and above competed for the main title and the pageant was live telecast on NTV with Sahana Bajracharya and Biraz Singh Khadka as the hosts.

== Results ==
Color keys

- The contestant Won in an International pageant.
- The contestant was a Runner-up in an International pageant.
- The contestant was a Semi-Finalist in an International pageant.
- The contestant assumed another title.
- The contestant was not able to compete in an International pageant.
- The contestant did not place but won a Special Award in the pageant.
- The contestant did not place.

Final results	Contestant	International pageant	International Results
Miss Nepal 2012 (Winner)	(United Kingdom) Cornwall - Shristi Shrestha	Miss World 2012	Top 30; Top 10 - Beach Beauty; Top 10 - Miss Multimedia
1st runner-up (Miss Earth Nepal 2012)	Kathmandu - Nagma Shrestha	Miss Earth 2012	Top 8 (silver) Walk with M.E; (silver) Dolphins Love Freedom Mural Painting Challenge
2nd runner-up (Miss International Nepal 2012)	(Nepal) Lalitpur - Subeksha Khadka	Miss International 2012	Unplaced
Top 5	(Nepal) Mahendranagar – Neelam Chand	Miss Globe 2012	Top 10
Top 5	(Nepal) Lalitpur - Bandana Tandukar		
Top 10	Kathmandu – Akesha Bista		
Top 10	Kathmandu – Prasansa Rana		
Top 10	Kathmandu – Sabita Manandhar		
Top 10	(Nepal) Kirtipur – Alisha Kunwar		
Top 10	(Nepal) Sarlahi – Sonam Singh		

=== Sub-titles ===
Award	Contestant
Miss Photogenic	Kathmandu – Akesha Bista
Miss Confidence	(Nepal) Chitwan - Shristi Shrestha
Miss Talent	Kathmandu – Akesha Bista
Miss Popular Choice	(Nepal) Mahendranagar - Neelam Chand
Miss Best Smile	Kathmandu - Nagma Shrestha

== Contestants ==
No	Name	Age	Height	Representing	Placement	Notes
1	Sonam Singh	23	5 ft 7 in (1.70m)	Sarlahi	Top 10	
2	Nirmita Subedi	25	5 ft 7.75 in (1.72m)	Chitwan		
3	Shristi Shrestha	23	5 ft 9 in (1.75m)	Chitwan	Miss Nepal World	Later Top 20 in Miss World 2012.
4	Nagma Shrestha	23	5 ft 11 in (1.80m)	Kathmandu	1st Runner Up	Later Top 8 in Miss Earth 2012.
5	Subeksha Khadka	22	5 ft 6 in (1.68m)	Lalitpur	2nd Runner Up	Competed in Miss International 2012
6	Bandana Tandukar	22	5 ft 7.75 in (1.72m)	Lalitpur	Top 5	
7	Heena Shrestha	21	5 ft 6 in (1.68m)	Jhapa		Miss Purwanchal 2012 2nd Runner Up
8	Prasansa Rana	20	5 ft 6.5 in (1.69m)	Kathmandu	Top 10	
9	Neelam Chand	24	5 ft 5 in (1.65m)	Mahendranagar	Top 5	Top 10 Miss Globe International 2012.
10	Dilasha GC	22	5 ft 7 in (1.70m)	Pokhara		
11	Rashmita Maharjan	21	5 ft 7.75 in (1.72m)	Lalitpur		Quit due to scooter accident
12	Anjali Pradhanang	20	5 ft 7 in (1.70m)	Butwal		
13	Pronika Sharma	21	5 ft 5 in (1.65m)	Birgunj		
14	Akesha Bista	19	5 ft 8 in (1.73m)	Kathmandu	Top 10	
15	Sabita Manandhar	19	5 ft 7.5 in (1.71m)	Kathmandu	Top 10	
16	Alisha Kunwar	19	5 ft 8 in (1.73m)	Kirtipur	Top 10	

== Notes ==
- Contestant #04, Nagma Shrestha was Miss College Ambassador 2008 & Miss Colleges 2009.
- Contestant #05, Subeksya Khadka was top 5 finalists in Miss Ecollege 2010.
- Contestant #06, Bandana Tandukar was 2nd runner-up in Miss Newa 2007.
- Contestant #07, Heena Shrestha was the 2nd runner up of Miss Purwanchal 2012.
- Contestant #08, Prasansha Rana competed in Miss Nepal 2011 and ended in top 10.
- Contestant #12, Anjali Pradhanang was the 1st runner up of Miss Teen Nepal 2010.
- Contestant #13, Akesha Bista has been awarded as Best Catwalk model at 2011 Nepal Fashion Week.
- Contestant #16, Alisha Kunwar was the 2nd runner up of Miss Teen Nepal 2010.
- Contestant #17, Indira Rai made it to top 10 semi finalists in Miss Purwanchal 2011.
- Originally there have been 17 shortlisted finalists for the finale but due to personal problems (#11) Rashmita Maharjan winner of Mega Model Season 2. has left the competition remaining with 16 candidates left.
