= Miss Maryland World =

Beauty pageant

- Formation: 1951
- Type: Beauty pageant
- Headquarters: Essex
- Location: Maryland
- Members: Miss World America (1951–present)
- Official language: English
- State Director: Faith Hassou
- Website: Official Website

The Miss Maryland World competition is a beauty pageant that selects the representative for Maryland in the Miss World America pageant.

The current Miss Maryland World is Meera Victoria Pick

== Winners ==
Color key

- Declared as Winner/Ended as Miss World America
- Ended as runner-up
- Ended as one of the finalists or semifinalists
- Ended as special awards winner
- Ended as Miss USA

Year	Name	Hometown	Age (Note: Age at the time of the Miss World America pageant)	Placement at Miss World America semifinalist	Special awards at Miss World America	Notes
2026-2024	Meera Victoria Pick	Olney	17-19	Semifinalist for Miss World America 2026		She became the top semifinalist for Miss World America in 2026. She has been Miss World America Maryland from 2024 to 2026. She is a health advocate, philanthropist, and is a coauthor of Heart Healthy Fun Food with her Aunt Jahnavi.
2020	Carissa Wu		20			
2019	Kenyatta Beazer	Baltimore	22	Top 25		
2018	did not compete					
2017	Mariela Pepin	Severn	21	Top 10		Previously Miss Maryland Teen USA 2014 and unplaced at Miss Teen USA 2014. Later Miss Maryland USA 2019 and Top 10 finalist at Miss USA 2019. Later Miss Luquillo World 2022 and competed for Miss World Puerto Rico 2022
2017	Chelsea Boone	Glenn Dale	26			
2016	Christina Denny	Baltimore	25	Top 12		Previously Miss Maryland 2013 and Miss Maryland USA 2016. Top 10 semi-finalist at Miss America 2014 and unplaced at Miss USA 2016.
2016	Sujita Basnet	Baltimore	23	Top 12		
2016	Tarese Taylor	Baltimore	25	Top 12	People's Choice	
2016	Ruby Johnson	Annapolis	19			Previously Miss Earth Maryland 2015 and a finalist at Miss Earth United States 2015.
2015	Syanne Centeno	Hughesville	23	Top 12		
Miss Maryland United States 2014
2014	Amanda Ross	Baltimore	23			
Miss Maryland World
2013	No titleholders as Miss World America was designated from 2006 to 2013.					
2012	No titleholders as Miss World America was designated from 2006 to 2013.					
2011	No titleholders as Miss World America was designated from 2006 to 2013.					
2010	No titleholders as Miss World America was designated from 2006 to 2013.					
2009	No titleholders as Miss World America was designated from 2006 to 2013.					
2008	No titleholders as Miss World America was designated from 2006 to 2013.					
2007	No titleholders as Miss World America was designated from 2006 to 2013.					
2006	No titleholders as Miss World America was designated from 2006 to 2013.					
2005	No known representatives from Maryland from 2003 to 2005.					
2004	No known representatives from Maryland from 2003 to 2005.					
2003	No known representatives from Maryland from 2003 to 2005.					
2002	No titleholders as Miss World America was designated from 1995 to 2002.					
2001	No titleholders as Miss World America was designated from 1995 to 2002.					
2000	No titleholders as Miss World America was designated from 1995 to 2002.					
1999	No titleholders as Miss World America was designated from 1995 to 2002.					
1998	No titleholders as Miss World America was designated from 1995 to 2002.					
1997	No titleholders as Miss World America was designated from 1995 to 2002.					
1996	No titleholders as Miss World America was designated from 1995 to 2002.					
1995	No titleholders as Miss World America was designated from 1995 to 2002.					
1994	Jennifer Kelly					
1993	Michelle Robert					
1992	Jeanne Hangliter					
Miss Maryland USA 1981-1991
1991	Lisa Marie Lawson	Crofton				
1990	Julie Stanford	Edgewater				Previously Miss Maryland Teen USA 1986
1989	Jackie Carroll	Gaithersburg				
1988	Rowanne Brewer	Silver Spring	23	Top 10	Miss Photogenic	Married rock musician Jani Lane
1987	Michelle Snow	Germantown				
1986	Kelly Koehler	Churchton				
1985	Christine Marie	Baldwin				
1984	Betsy Cook*	Bethesda				
1983	Shawn Keller	Ashton				
1982	Angie Boyer	Dunkirk	18	Top 12		
1981	Linda Susan Lambert	Baltimore	22	Top 12		
Miss Maryland World
1980	Lori Estep	Washington, D.C.				Later Miss District of Columbia USA 1982 and contestant at Miss USA 1982.
1979	Sheri Clineman					
1978	Celeste Woschke					
1977	Lydia Vuynovich					
1976	Amy Whiting					
1975	Elizabeth Erinn Pittengee					
1974	Deborah Lynn Goode					
1973	Bonnie Joy Bidlack			Top 16		
1972	Pia Nancy Canzani	Baltimore	23			Later Miss American Beauty 1973 (Miss U.S. International 1973). Competed at Miss International 1973 as Miss American Beauty (USA).
1971	Gail Somerville			Top 18		
1970	Carlotta V. Moore					
1969	Paulette Reck	Perry Hall	21	2nd Runner-Up		Previously Miss Maryland USA 1968 and 1st Runner-Up at Miss USA 1968.
1968	Evelyn Everhart					
1967	Paula Jean Martin			Top 15		
1966	Unknown					
1965	Sharon Jane Dennis					
1964	Laurie Mills					Competed as Maryland
1964	Gloria Mathis	Annapolis				Competed as Annapolis, Maryland
1963	Kathy Alexander	Baltimore				Competed as Baltimore, Maryland: No official Miss Maryland World titleholder; Kathy Alexander was Miss Baltimore, MD World
1962	Betsy Reeves					
1961	Diane Dolores White	Baltimore	26	3rd Runner-Up		Previously Miss Maryland USA 1959 and Top 15 semi-finalist at Miss USA 1959.
1960	Carolyn Clark					
1959	No known representatives from Maryland in 1958 & 1959.					
1958	No known representatives from Maryland in 1958 & 1959.					
Miss Maryland USA 1953-1957
1957	Mary Leona Gage*	Glen Burnie	18	Miss USA 1957		Dethroned after it was discovered she was married and had two children
1956	Charlene Holt*	Annapolis	28	Top 15		
1955	Gloria Ruth King	Baltimore				
1954	Barbara Eschenburg	Berlin		Top 21		Later Disqualified (under age)
1953	Diane Gale Durham	Silver Spring				
Miss Maryland World
1952	No known representatives from Maryland in 1951 & 1952.					
1951	No known representatives from Maryland in 1951 & 1952.					

Notes to table
