= Priya Sigdel =

Nepali beauty pageant contestant

- Born: December 8, 1995 (age 30); Kathmandu, Nepal
- Education: Graduate Development Studies
- Alma mater: National College, Kathmandu|National College, Kathmandu, Nepal
- Occupations: Cofounder/President HattiHatti Nepal, Women Activist, Beauty Pageant Title Holder
- Height: 1.77 m (5 ft 9 1/2 in)
- Beauty pageant titleholder
- Title: Miss Earth Nepal 2018 Cofounder/President HattiHatti Nepal
- Hair color: Dark Brown
- Eye color: Brown
- Major competitions: Miss Nepal 2018 (Miss Nepal Earth); Miss Earth 2018 (Top 18)

Priya Sigdel (Nepali: प्रिया सिग्देल; born December 8, 1995) is a Nepali activist and beauty pageant titleholder who won the title of Miss Nepal Earth 2018.

== Biography ==
Priya Sigdel was born in Kathmandu, Nepal. She is the co-founder and president of Hatti Hatti Nepal. She is also the national coordinator of Bangladesh-Nepal Youth Convention. She is a member of the 2017 Global Changemakers cohort and a 2016 Global Young Peace Ambassador.

She is a Development Studies graduate from the National College, Baluwatar and a country coordinator for UDAAN Foundation. She represented Nepal at Miss Earth 2018. She also participated in Miss Vibhaa 2020 and placed in the top 10.

Awards and achievements
Preceded by Rojina Shrestha	Miss Nepal Earth; 2018	Succeeded by Riya Basnet
