= Miss Universe Nepal 2023 =

7th Edition of Miss Universe Nepal

- Date: September 9, 2023
- Hosts: Sanjay Silwal Gupta; Subeksha Khadka
- Venue: Godavari Sunrise Convention Center
- Broadcaster: Kantipur Television
- Director: Uddhab Adhikari
- Producer: Umanga Creation Pvt. Ltd.
- Sponsor: Dusit Princess Kathmandu (Hospitality) Asian Paints (Title)
- Entrants: 22
- Placements: 10
- Winner: Jane Dipika Garrett; Kathmandu
- Social Impact Leader: Abhilasa Lamsal; Lalitpur

Miss Universe Nepal 2023 (MUN 2023), was organized by Umanga Creation Pvt. Ltd. at Godavari Sunrise Convention Center, Lalitpur on September 9, 2023. Sophiya Bhujel crowned Jane Dipika Garrett of Kathmandu as Miss Universe Nepal 2023 at the end of the event. Garrett represented Nepal at Miss Universe 2023 and placed at Top 20.

The event was live streamed on television and YouTube channels of Kantipur Television.

== Background ==
The registrations for Miss Universe Nepal 2023 were open on July 18, 2023. The pageant was open to married, unmarried, divorced and transgender women, aged 18 and above with no restriction on height, body type and physical measurements. The press conference was organized at Nepal Tourism Board office. Prashant Tamrakar was introduced as the choreographer of the pageant.

Major Events
Event	Date	Venue
Press Meet	27 July 2023	NTB Office, Kathmandu
Quarter Final Q/A Round	9 August 2023	Virtual
Quarter Final Swimsuit Round	10 August 2023	Virtual
Press Presentation	18 August 2023	Dusit Princess Kathmandu
Preliminary Interviews	5 September 2023	Dusit Princess Kathmandu
Preliminary Swimsuit Contest	8 September 2023	Dusit Princess Kathmandu
Grand Finale	9 September 2023	Godavari Sunrise Convention Center, Lalitpur

== Results ==
Placement	Contestant
Miss Universe Nepal	Kathmandu/ USA – Jane Dipika Garrett §
1st runner-up	(Nepal) Biratnagar – Garima Ghimire
2nd runner-up	Adelaide, Australia - Buddhisara Sunar
3rd runner-up	(Nepal) Lalitpur – Shitashma Pokharel
4th runner-up	(Nepal) Lalitpur – Abhilasha Lamsal ฿
Top 10	(Nepal) Butwal – Sarosy Neupane
Top 10	(Nepal) Jhapa – Sanskriti Chhetri Karki
Top 10	Kathmandu – Alista Subedi
Top 10	(Nepal) Lalitpur – Chanel Shrestha
Top 10	(Nepal) Pokhara – Sangita 'Puja' Paudel

(§): The candidate won the Miss People's Choice Award (online voting) and got direct entry into Top 10 Finalists.

(฿): The candidate won the Social Impact Leader Award (Best BBB (Brave, Bold and Beautiful) Social Advocacy) and got direct entry into Top 10 Finalists.

=== International Representation ===
Miss Universe Nepal 2023, Jane Dipika Garrett competed at Miss Universe 2023, where she emerged at Top 20 placement. She got recognition as the first plus size model to enter Miss Universe Semi Finals.

== Subtitles ==
Special Award	Contestant
LeadX Social Impact Leader	(Nepal) Lalitpur – Abhilasha Lamsal
NIU Miss Eco Infinity	(Nepal) Bhairahawa – Prema Lamgade
Byanjan Miss Lifestyle	(Nepal) Lalitpur – Shitashma Pokharel
KTM CTY Miss Fabulous	Kathmandu – Alista Subedi
Nepal Telecom Miss ICT	(Nepal) Lalitpur – Shitashma Pokharel
WOW Magazine Miss Free & Fearless	(Nepal) Bhairahawa – Prema Lamgade
Miss People's Choice	Kathmandu – Jane Dipika Garrett
AGNI Miss Fierce	(Nepal) Pokhara – Sangita 'Puja' Paudel
MARTINI Sun Angel	(Nepal) Pokhara – Sangita 'Puja' Paudel
Dusit Princess Miss Elegance	(Nepal) Lalitpur – Abhilasha Lamsal
The Himalayan Times Miss Unstoppable	(Nepal) Butwal – Sarosy Neupane
Röyale Bling Miss Dazzling Diva	(Nepal) Lalitpur – Shitashma Pokharel
Röyale Play Miss Creative Canvas	(Nepal) Jhapa – Amisha Basnet
True Me Miss True Beauty	Kathmandu - Palistha Bajracharya

== Contestants ==
=== Top 22 Finalists ===
Contestant Number	Candidate		Hometown	Age
Contestant Number	Romanized name	Nepali name	Hometown	Age
3	Shitashma Pokharel	शिताश्मा पोखरेल	(Nepal) Lalitpur	23
4	Sarosy Neupane	सरोशी न्यौपाने	(Nepal) Butwal	20
5	Prarabdhi Gyawali	प्रारब्धि ज्ञवाली	Brisbane, Australia	27
7	Prapti Khadka	प्राप्ति खड्का	(Nepal) Lalitpur	25
8	Sabina Chaudhary	सबिना चौधरी	(Nepal) Bhaktapur	27
12	Chanel Shrestha	च्यानल श्रेष्ठ	(Nepal) Lalitpur	24
14	Prema Lamgade	प्रेमा लामगडे	(Nepal) Bhairahawa	23
15	Pooja Bhagat	पुजा भगत	(Nepal) Mahottari	26
17	Rojina Kafle	रोजिना काफ्ले	(Nepal) Tehrathum	23
18	Garima Ghimire	गरिमा घिमिरे	(Nepal) Biratnagar	20
19	Palistha Bajracharya	पालिस्टा बज्राचार्य	Kathmandu	22
20	Amisha Basnet	अमिषा बस्नेत	(Nepal) Jhapa	24
21	Sanskriti Karki Chhetri	संस्कृति कार्की क्षेत्री	(Nepal) Jhapa	20
23	Trishna Baniya	तृष्णा बानिया	Kathmandu	22
25	Buddhisara Sunar	बुद्धिसरा सुनार	Adelaide, Australia	27
26	Sangita 'Puja' Paudel	संगिता 'पुजा' पौडेल	(Nepal) Pokhara	20
27	Jane Dipika Garrett	जेन दीपिका ग्यारेट	Kathmandu/ USA	22
29	Manita Paswan	मनिता पासवान	(Nepal) Nawalpur	26
31	Sushma RL Shahi	सुष्मा राज्यलक्ष्मी शाह	(Nepal) Dang	23
33	Abhilasha Lamsal	अभिलाषा लम्साल	(Nepal) Lalitpur	28
36	Alista Subedi	एलिस्टा सुवेदी	Kathmandu	24
37	Mausami Shrestha	मौसमी श्रेष्ठ	(Nepal) Biratnagar	28

== External Link ==
Miss Universe Nepal 2023 Grand Finale Full Show
