= Subeksha Khadka =

Nepalese beauty pageant titleholder (born 1994)

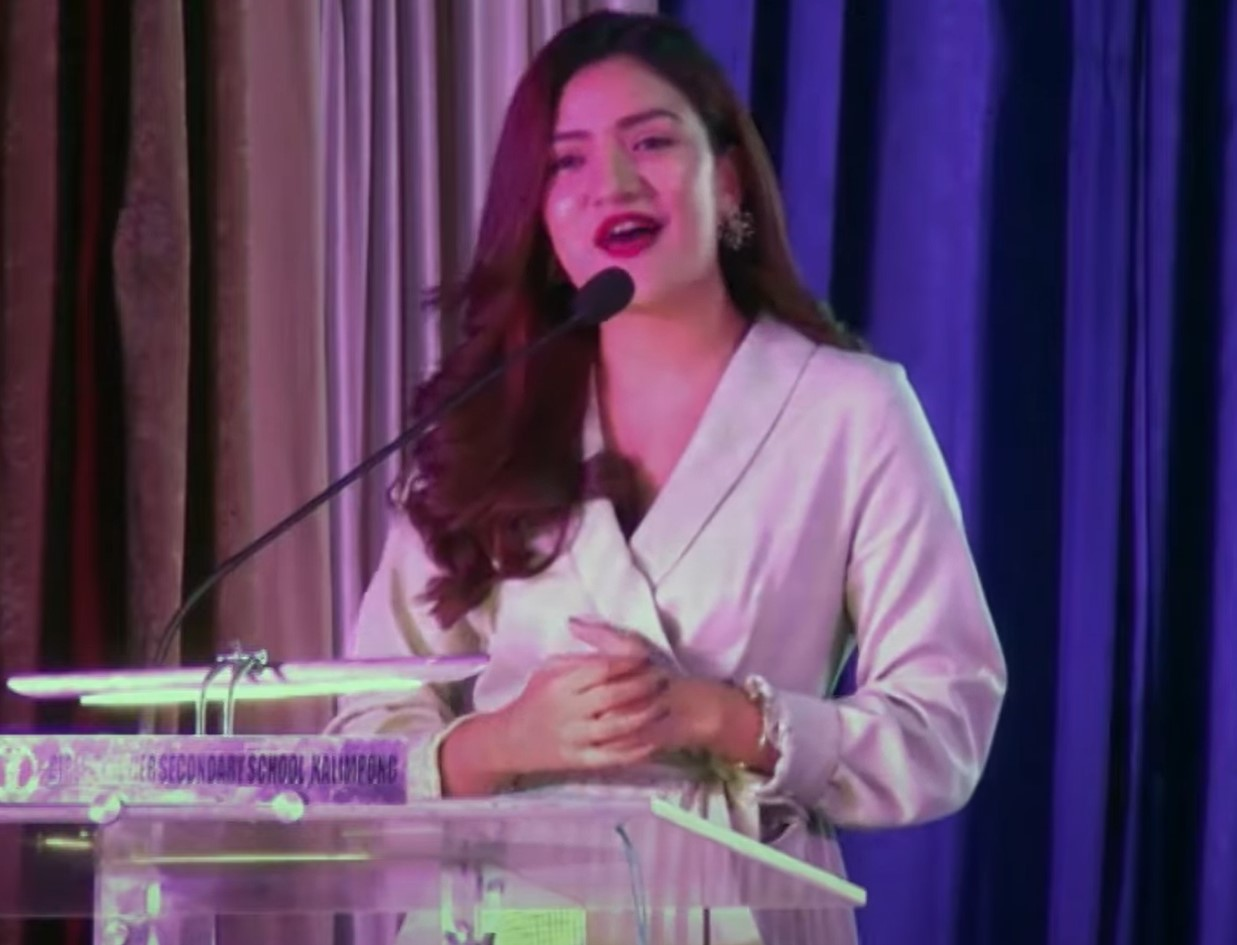
- Khadka speaking at an event in Kalimpong
- Born: Subeksha Khadka; January 7, 1994 (age 32); Kathmandu, Nepal
- Other name: Subu
- Education: Bachelors
- Alma mater: Wigan & Leogh College Nepal
- Height: 5 ft 6 in (1.68 m)
- Beauty pageant titleholder
- Title: Miss Nepal International 2012
- Hair color: Brown
- Eye color: Black
- Major competitions: Miss Nepal 2012; Miss International 2012 (winner)
- Website: missnepal.org/subeksha-khadka

Subeksha Khada (born Jan 7, 1994 in Kathmandu, Nepal) is a Nepalese actress, TV host, model and beauty pageant titleholder who was crowned Miss Nepal International 2012 and World Miss University Nepal 2017. She started her modeling career as a television presenter at the age of 17. She represented Nepal at the Miss International 2012 pageant held in Japan.

== Personal life ==
Khadka got engaged to Ashwasan Joshi in 2023.

== Filmography ==
Ranveer (2019)

Prema (2023) as Prema
