= Miss Teen Nepal =

Soniya Shrestha: Dubai's Multitalented Creative Force

Miss Teen Nepal is the teen-largest beauty pageant in Nepal. This pageant is held by the Kathmandu Jaycees where; teen-aged girls from Nepal participate in the pageant. The reigning Miss Teen Nepal is Miss Sara Pandey, who was crowned as Miss Teen Nepal in 2024.

The first runner-up of Miss Teen Nepal 2024 is Miss Subika Upadhyaya and the second runner-up of Miss Teen Nepal 2024 is Miss Samriddhi Pokharel .

== History ==
Kathmandu Jaycees first launched Miss Teen Nepal in 2002, and it has been held annually since then. The pageant, now known as JCI Miss Teen Nepal, is organized by Kathmandu Jaycees and is considered the second-largest beauty pageant in Nepal. Over the years, the competition has successfully completed 18 editions.

The pageant focuses on talented, intelligent, and confident young girls who wish to participate. A total of 24 to 25 participants are selected as finalists. Once selected, the finalists undergo grooming and training for 22–24 days before the Grand Finale. These training sessions provide contestants with valuable opportunities to develop their personalities, improve public speaking, and interact with prominent figures from various fields. Past Miss Nepal and Miss Teen winners also share their experiences, while a variety of outdoor activities are organized for the contestants' refreshment, entertainment, and learning. The pageant is broadcast live on Image Television.

To compete in Miss Teen Nepal, applicants must be between 16 and 18 years old, though the age limit was extended to 19 in 2006. In 2007, a controversy arose between Khusbu Oli and her successor, Ayusha Karki. Ayusha had participated in another pageant, World Miss University 2007, less than a month after winning Miss Teen Nepal, where she won the crown, and Khusbu ended up as the first runner-up. This situation led to the dispute.

== Miss Teen Nepal Winners ==
Year	Miss Teen Nepal	1st Runner-Up	2nd Runner-Up
2002	Amanda Manandhar Gurung; Kaski District	Rabina Shrestha; Kathmandu District	Prerana Shah; Kathmandu District
2003	Pravina Thapa; Chitwan District		
2004	No Competition		
2005	Priyanka Karki; Sunsari District	Shibani Pandey; Kathmandu District	Sonam Wangmo Sherpa; Mustang District
2006	Khusbu Oli; Kathmandu District	Swekshya Adhikary; Kathmandu District	Samriddhi Rai; Lalitpur District
2007	Ayusha Karki; Kathmandu District	Prechhya Adhikari; Taplejung District	Anita Silwal; Kathmandu District
2008	Anamika Gurung; Kathmandu District	Sarah Shilpaili; Lalitpur District	Raisa Banmali; Kathmandu District
2009	Shreeya Poudyal; Kathmandu District	Monika KC; Kathmandu District	Evita Tamrakar; Kavrepalanchok District
2010	Kreety Tamang Lama; Kathmandu District	Anjali Pradhanang; Rupandehi District	Alisha Kunwar; Kathmandu District
2011	Astha Shrestha; Lalitpur District	Paridhi Sharma; Banke District	Shristi Saud; Parsa District
2012	Keshu Khadka; Lalitpur District	Monica Sapkota; Kathmandu District	Ayushma Shrestha; Bhaktapuri District
2013	Shambhani Rimal; Kathmandu District	Jyoti Sunuwar; Sunsari District	Mokshada Upreti; Morang District
2014	Ritika Kharel; Kathmandu District	Samana Gurung; Kathmandu District	Malisha Maharjan; Bhaktapur District
2015	Dhriti KC; Kathmandu District	Rosy Giri; Kathmandu District	Alisha Limbu; Sunsari District
2016	Jasmine Khadka; Kathmandu District	Urja Newa; Lalitpur District	Anushka Adhikari; Kathmandu District
2017	Sanju Moktan; Bhaktapur District	Mary Limbu; Jhapa District	Diya Mandal Sijapati; Kathmandu District
2018	No Competition		
2019	Cindy Bajracharya; Kathmandu District	Sabina Karki; Kathmandu District	Pragya Bhandari; Jhapa District
2021	Aditi Koirala; Kathmandu District	Soniya K.C. Kathmandu District	Ashma Pandey; Kathmandu District
2022	Pratikchhya Dangol; Kathmandu District	Susmita Adhikari; Chitwan District	Susjita Paudel; Bhaktapur District
2024	Sara Pandey; Kathmandu District	Subika Upadhyaya; Kaski District	Samriddhi Pokharel; Kathmandu District

== Miss Teen Nepal 2024 ==
No	Contestant	Age (Note: Ages at the time of the pageant)	Hometown	Placement	Notes
1	Sristi Sharma	16	Baglung		
2	Aashika Rai	16	Dharan		
3	Ishita Panta	16	Gorkha		
4	Swadeshika Shrestha	16	Kathmandu		
5	Sara Pandey	18	Kathmandu		
6	Prapti Singh Rathour	15	Nepalgunj		
7	Rijula Shrestha	17	Kathmandu		
8	Kripa Shrestha	16	Kathmandu		
9	Aashu Chaudhary	15	Janakpur		
10	Subika Upadhyaya	17	Pokhara		
11	Aakriti Kandel	17	Butwal		
12	Juna Shrestha	18	Pokhara		Miss SEE Supermodel 2022
13	Grisma Banjade	17	Butwal		
14	Prashna Adhikari	17	Dhading		
15	Samriddhi Pokharel	18	Kathmandu		
16	Anusuya Chand Thakuri	17	Baitadi		

== Remarks ==
- Ayusha Karki, Miss Teen Nepal 2007; had later won the title of World Miss University Nepal 2007 and also competed in Miss Nepal 2009 ended in top 5 finalists.
- Samriddhi Rai, Miss Teen Nepal 2006 2nd runner up; later competed in Miss Nepal 2010 and ended as a top 5 finalists. In 2011, she got selected to join Miss Tourism Queen Int'l 2011.
- Prerana Shah, Miss Teen Nepal 2002 2nd runner up; joined Miss Nepal 2003 and become 1st runner up and ended as a top 10 semi finalists at Miss Asia Pacific 2003.
- Jasmine Khadka, Miss Teen Nepal 2016 played role of "Sabyata" in Nepali popular serial "Parichaya". She participated in Miss universe Nepal 2022 where she finished 6th position.
- Anushka Adhikari, Miss Teen Nepal 2016 2nd runner up played the role of "Biru" in youth popular Nepali series "21st love".
- Miss Teen Nepal 2005, Priyanka Karki is national award winning actress of Nepali Movies Industry
- Keshu Khadka, Miss Teen Nepal 2012 later participated in Miss universe Nepal 2021, ended as 3rd runner up. Later, she competed in Mr&Miss Supranational Nepal 2022 where she finished as winner and represent Nepal in Miss Supranational 2022.

== See also ==
- Miss Nepal
