= List of Miss Nepal titleholders =

This is a list of women who have held the Miss Nepal title.

== Miss Nepal titleholders ==
Year	Miss Nepal	Representative	Birth Place	Ethnicity	Age	Education	Date	Delegates
1994	Ruby Rana	Kunta	Lalitpur	Thakuri (Thakuri)	20	IA	7 May	21
1995	Sumi Khadka	Kathmandu	Kathmandu District	Khas (Chhetri)	18	Flight Attendant	10 October	21
1996	Poonam Ghimire	Kathmandu	Kathmandu District	Khas (Brahmins)	23	Nursing	8 June	16
1997	Nilima Gurung	Pokhara	Kaski District	Gurung	19	+2		
1997	Jharana Bajracharya	Kathmandu	Kathmandu District	Newar (Gubhaju-Bareju)	16	+2	10 October	18
1998	Jyoti Pradhan (Dethroned)^{1}	Kathmandu	Kathmandu District	Newar (Pradhan)	19	ISC	12 September	15
1998	Niru Shrestha Gurung	Kathmandu	Kathmandu District	Newar (Shrestha)	19	Pilot	12 September	15
1999	Shewta Singh	Kathmandu	Kathmandu District	Newar (Jyapu)	19	Intermediate	3 September	14
2000	Usha Khadgi	Birgunj	Parsa District	Newar (Nay/Khadgi)	20	BA	1 October	20
2002	Malvika Subba	Dharan	Kathmandu District	Limbu	21	BBA	7 December	16
2003	Priti Sitoula	Kathmandu	Kathmandu District	Khas (Brahmins)	22	BA	13 September	16
2004	Payal Shakya	Kathmandu	Kathmandu District	Newar (Gubhaju-Bareju)	18	+2	7 August	18
2005	Sugarika KC	Lalitpur	Lalitpur District	Khas (Chhetri)	19	BSC	7 April	19
2007	Sitashma Chand	Lalitpur	Lalitpur District	Khas (Thakuri)	23	Graduation	7 April	19
2009	Zenisha Moktan	Kathmandu	Kathmandu District	Tamang	20	BBS	25 September	16
2010	Sadichha Shrestha	Kathmandu	Kathmandu District	Newar (Shrestha)	19	BBS	1 September	18
2011	Malina Joshi	Dharan	Sunsari District	Newar (Joshi)	23	BBA	30 August	19
2012	Shristi Shrestha	Chitwan	Chitwan District	Newar (Shrestha)	23	Nursing	6 May	17
2013	Ishani Shrestha	Kathmandu	Kathmandu District	Newar (Shrestha)	21	Dental	20 March	18
2014	Subin Limbu	Dharan	Sunsari District	Limbu	23	BA	2 May	19
2015	Evana Manandhar	Kathmandu	Kathmandu District	Newar (Sayami)	23	BBA	18 April	19
2016	Asmi Shrestha	Chitwan	Chitwan District	Newar (Shrestha)	22	BBA	8 April	19
2017	Nikita Chandak	Urlabari	Morang District	Marwadi	20	BA Fashion Communication	2 June	19
2018	Shrinkhala Khatiwada	Hetauda	Makwanpur District	Khas (Brahmins)	22	B.Arch.	11 April	25
2019	Anushka Shrestha	Kathmandu	Kathmandu District	Newar (Shrestha)	23	B. Com (Accounting)	9 May	25
2020	Namrata Shrestha	Kathmandu	Kathmandu District	Newar (Shrestha)	23	MSSc	5 December	21
2022	Priyanka Rani Joshi	Kathmandu	Kathmandu District	Newar (Joshi)	24	BA in Hospitality and Recreation Marketing	18 June	24
2023	Srichchha Pradhan	Kathmandu	Kathmandu District	Newar (Pradhan)	24	Environmental Science	27 May	24
2024	Ashma Kumari KC	Kathmandu	Kathmandu District	Khas (Chhetri)	26	Social Work	3 August	26
2025	Luna Luitel	Kathmandu	Kathmandu District	Khas (Brahmins)	26	Nursing	30 August	26
2026	Deepmala Dhakal	Hong Kong	Hong Kong	Khas (Brahmins)	24	Finance and Economics	1 August	24

1. In 1998; Jyoti Pradhan, Miss Nepal 1998 had been stripped off her title after she didn't manage to fulfill the responsibilities of the title holder and the 1st Runner Up, Niru Shrestha was given the main title.

Notes
^{a} Age at time of winning Miss Nepal

=== Winners' gallery ===
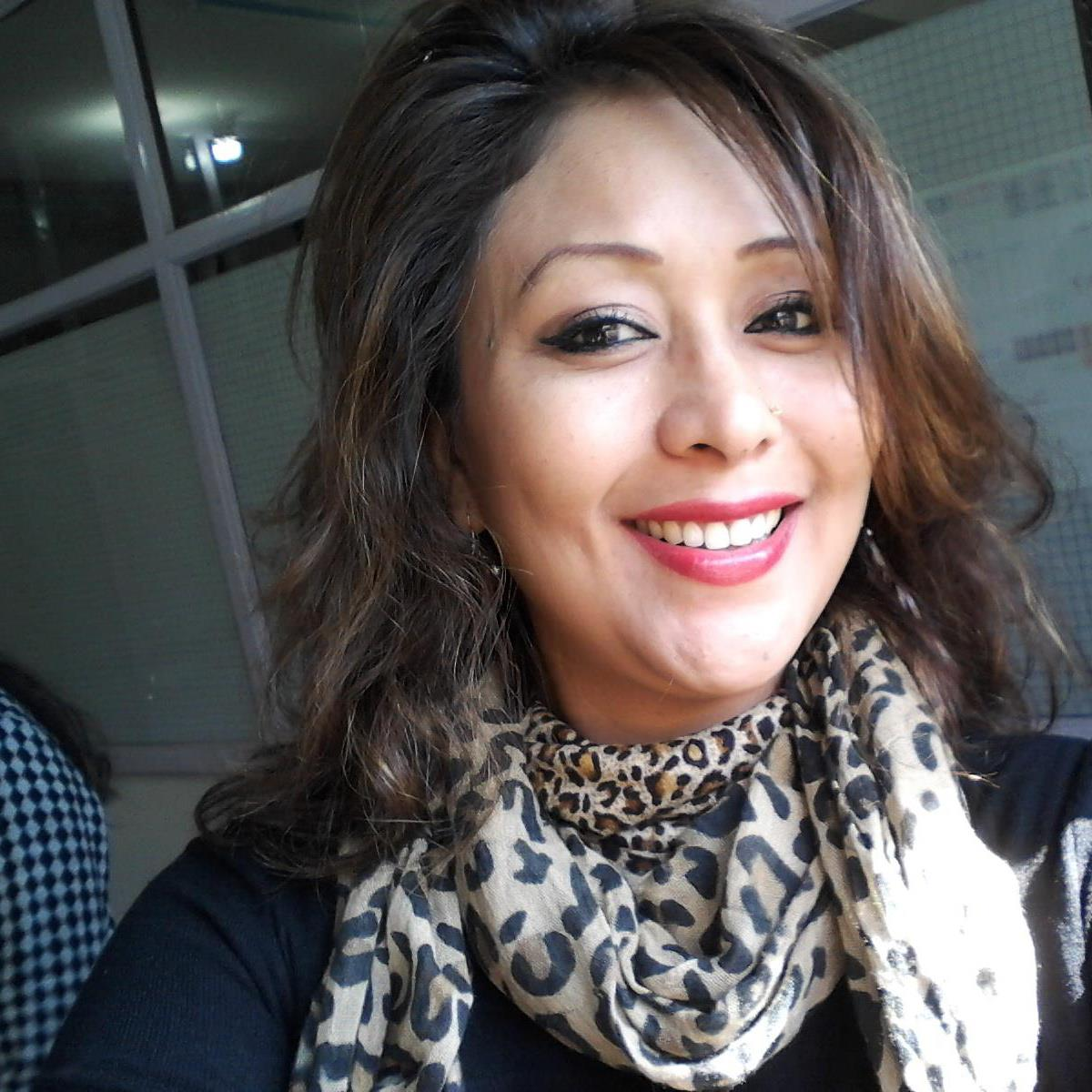
Miss Nepal 1994
Ruby Rana, Birgunj.

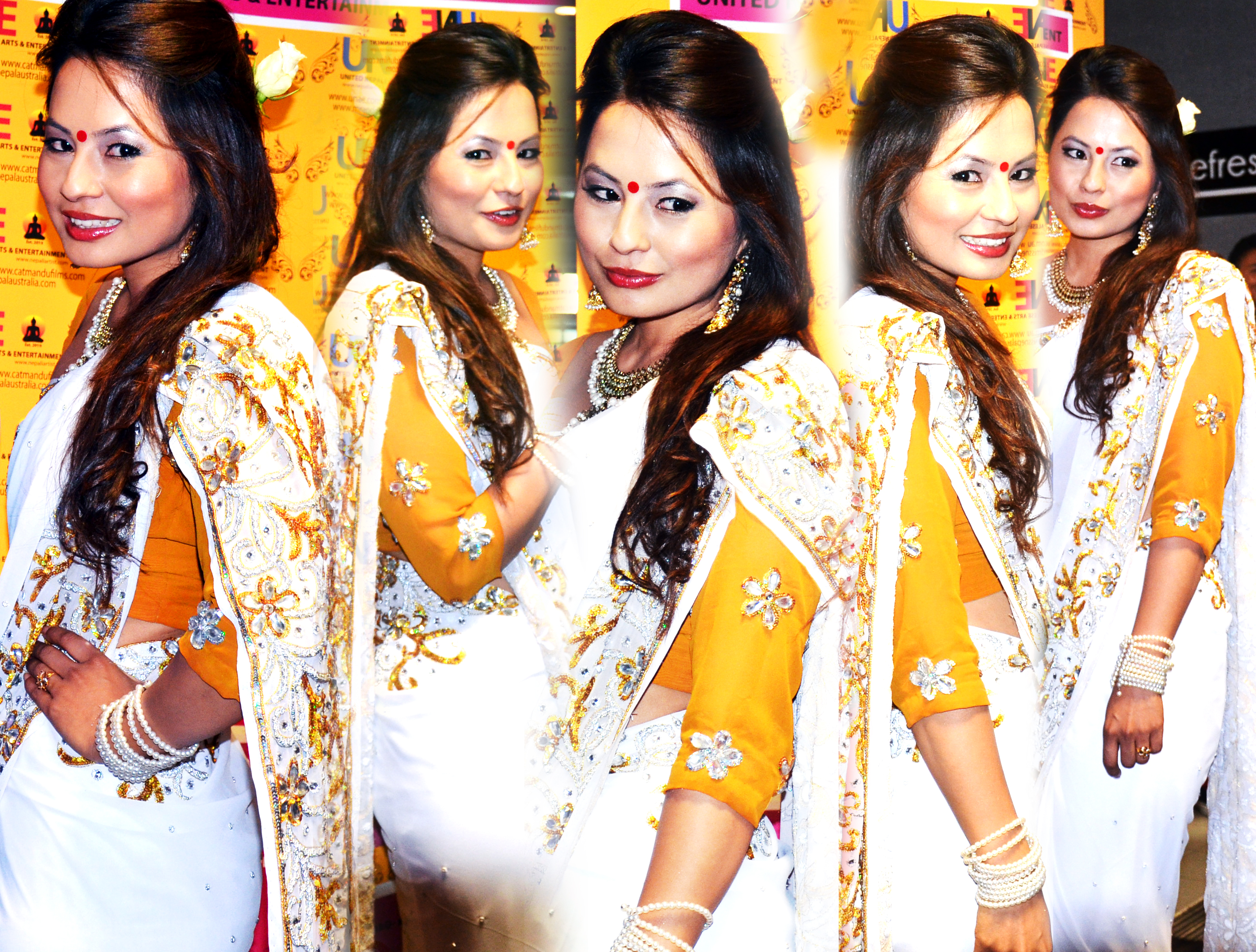
Miss Nepal 2002
Malvika Subba, Kathmandu.

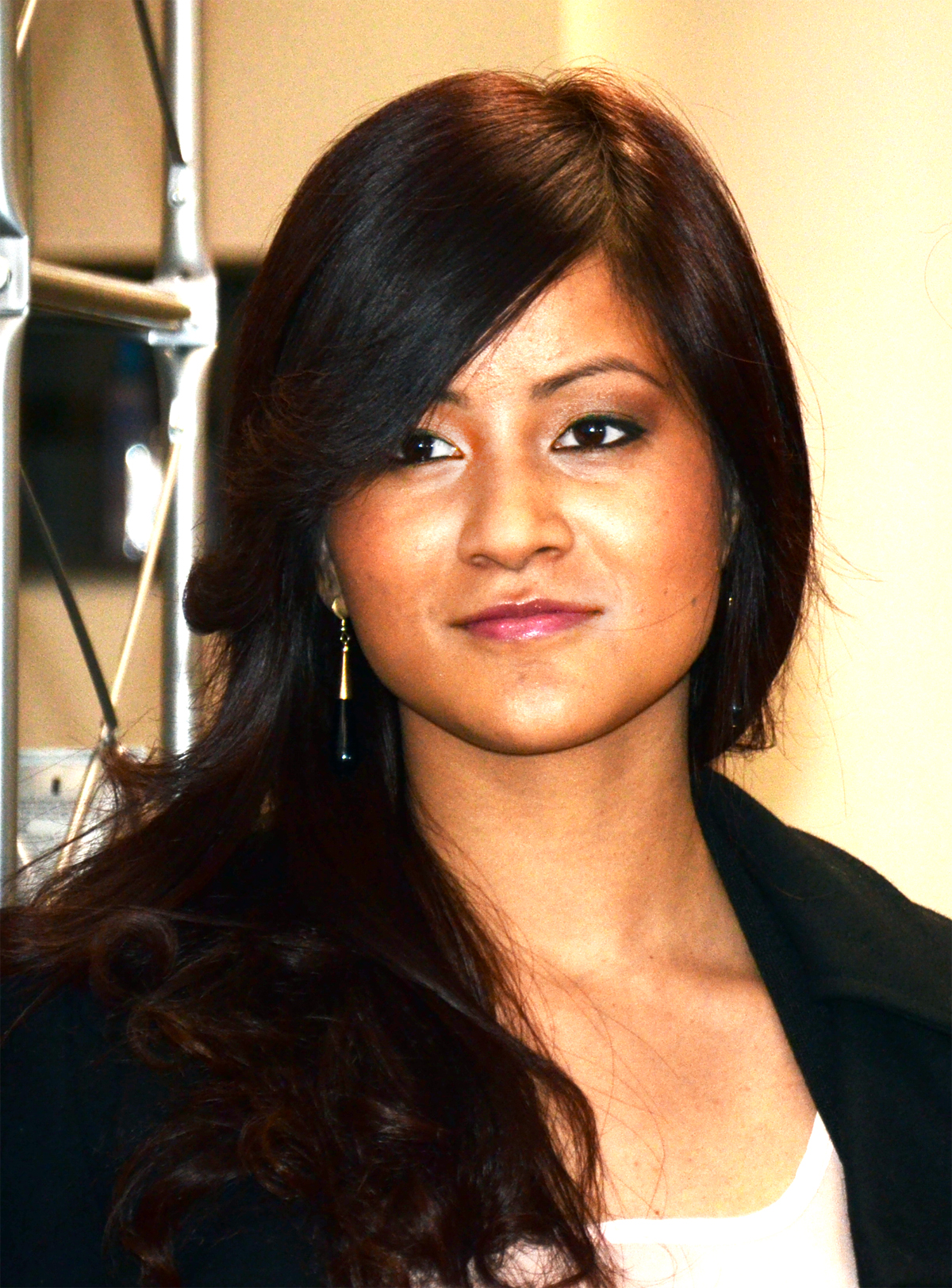
Miss Nepal 2004
Payal Shakya, Kathmandu.

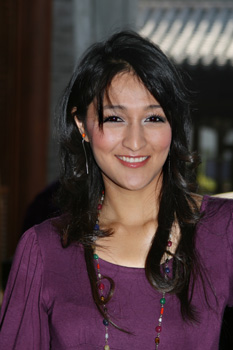
Miss Nepal 2007
Sitashma Chand, Lalitpur.

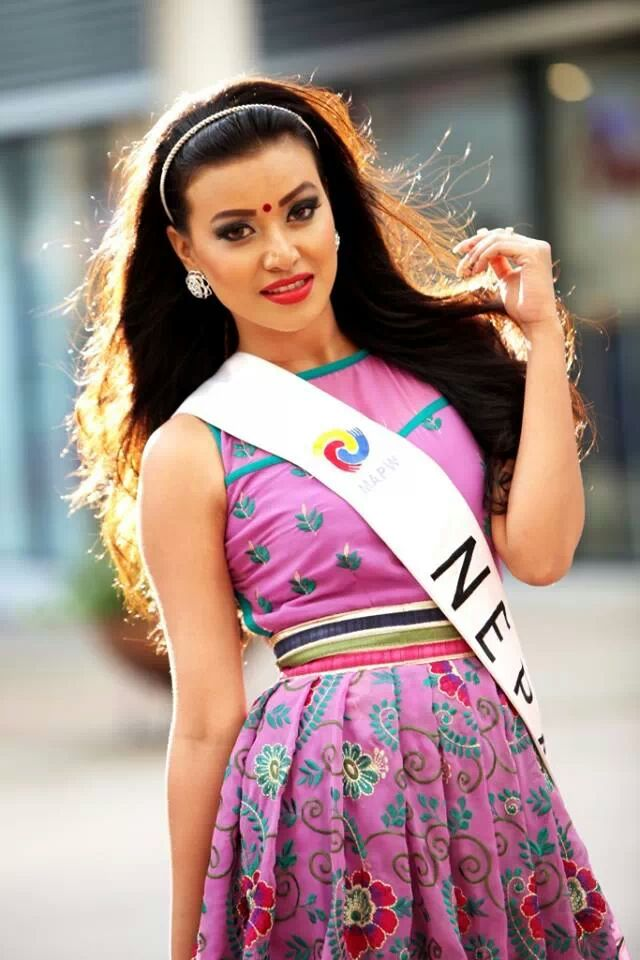
Miss Nepal 2011
Malina Joshi, Dharan.

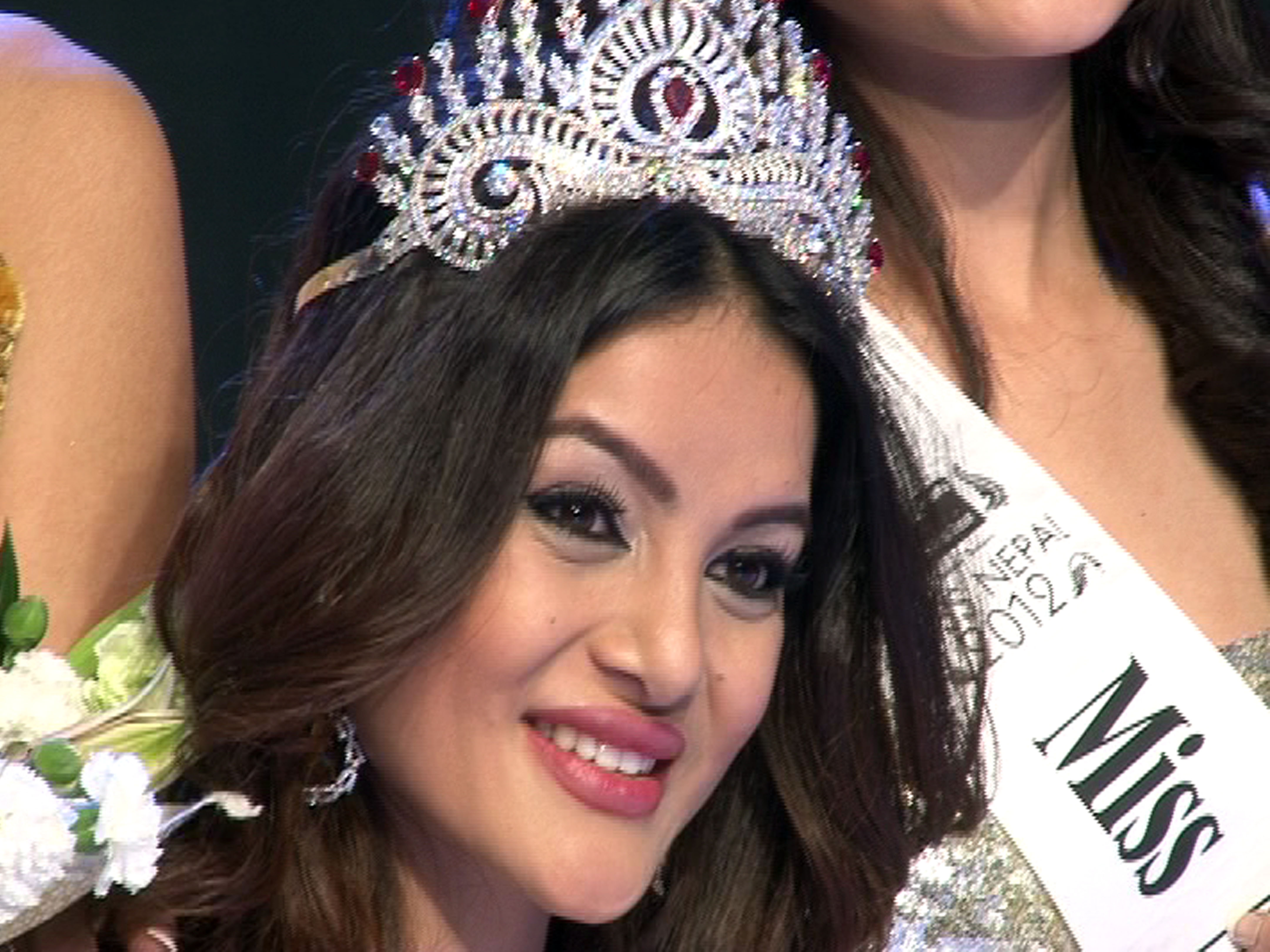
Miss Nepal 2012
Shristi Shrestha, Chitwan.

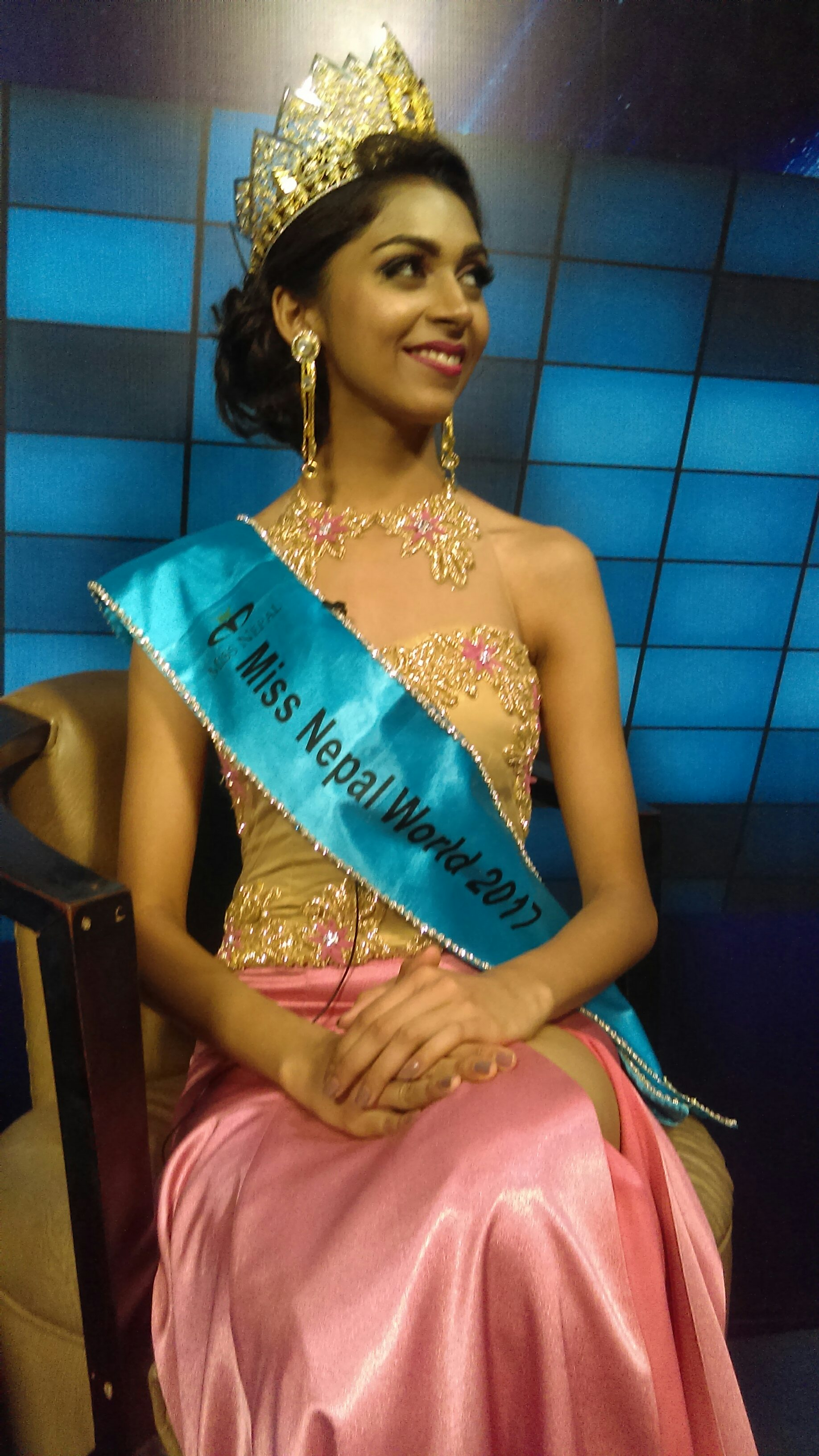
Miss Nepal 2017
Nikita Chandak, Miss Urlabari.

Miss Nepal winners by districts up to 2016 (Includes dethroned winners and those who have inherited the title.)

== Full Results ==
Miss Nepal has specific titles and crowns for each runner-ups. To distinguish the runner-ups at the national competition from the global level, Miss Nepal has included the titles of "Miss Nepal Earth" and "Miss Nepal International" before the names of the 1st & 2nd Runner Ups. Since 2011 onwards, the host announced the names of the 3rd and 4th runner ups.

Since 2017, Miss Nepal has announced Top 7 Finalists with 1st Runner Up as Miss Nepal Earth (2nd Place), 2nd Runner Up as Miss Nepal International (3rd Place), 3rd Runner Up as Miss Nepal Asia Pacific International (4th Place) and 3 Runner Ups (5th-7th Place).

== Runners-Up at Miss Nepal ==
Year	1st Runner-Up	2nd Runner-Up	3rd Runner-Up	4th Runner-Up
1994	Latika Maskey; Kathmandu, Nepal	Beenu Shrestha; Kathmandu, Nepal	Annu Radha Pudusaini; Lalitpur, Nepal	Indira Thapa; Kathmandu, Nepal
1995	Rita Gurung; Pokhara, Nepal	Trishna Kunwar; Lumbini, Nepal	Pabina Khadka; Lalitpur, Nepal	Jasmina KC; Kathmandu, Nepal
1996	Kalpana Noreen Gurung; Kathmandu, Nepal	Nirmala Basnet; Kathmandu, Nepal	Shova Chand; Baitadi, Nepal	Jasmina KC; Kathmandu, Nepal
1997	Abhilasha Rana; Kathmandu, Nepal	Sareeta Shri Gyawali; Bardiya, Nepal	Neema Tamang; Kathmandu, Nepal	Charu Shree Joshi; Lalitpur, Nepal
1998	Niru Shrestha; Kathmandu, Nepal	Kriti Shrestha; Dharan, Nepal	Prabha Amatya; Kathmandu, Nepal	Sunjita Ranjit; Pokhara, Nepal
1999	Nikita Bhandari Kshatriya; Kathmandu, Nepal	Kriti Shrestha; Pokhara, Nepal	Nutan Sharma; Jhapa, Nepal	Prakriti Devkota; Kathmandu, Nepal
2000	Biva Maya Ranjeet; Kathmandu, Nepal	Smriti Singh; Kathmandu, Nepal	Aishwarya Basnet; Lalitpur, Nepal	Rajeswori Shrestha; Kathmandu, Nepal
2002	Pinky Shah; Kathmandu, Nepal	Lhama Yangchen Sherpa; Bardiya, Nepal	Suchitra Acharya; Kathmandu, Nepal	Aparna Shah; Lalitpur, Nepal
2003	Prerana Shah; Kathmandu, Nepal	Numa Rai; Lalitpur, Nepal	Ramani Joshi; Kathmandu, Nepal	Rupa Upadhyay; Kathmandu, Nepal
2004	Sarah Gurung; Kathmandu, Nepal	Anita Gurung; Pokhara, Nepal	Harina Bogati; Kathmandu, Nepal	Mamta Malhotra; Kathmandu, Nepal
2005	Shavona Shrestha; Kathmandu, Nepal	Ayushma Pokharel; Kathmandu, Nepal	Bilena Malla; Kathmandu, Nepal	Pratiksha Moktan; Kathmandu, Nepal
2007	Bandana Sharma; Lalitpur, Nepal	Shweta Shah; Lalitpur, Nepal	Babita Manandhar; Kathmandu, Nepal	Bibha Prajapati; Kathmandu, Nepal
2009	Richa Thapa Magar; Kathmandu, Nepal	Kunchhang Moktan Tamang; Kathmandu, Nepal	Aayusha Karki; Kathmandu, Nepal	Reetu Shakya; Lalitpur, Nepal
2010	Sahana Bajracharya; Surkhet, Nepal	Sanyukta Timsina; Kathmandu, Nepal	Samriddhi Rai] Lalitpur, Nepal	Ajita Singh; Kathmandu, Nepal
2011	Anupama Aura Gurung; Chitwan, Nepal	Sarina Maskey; Narayangarh, Nepal	Manisha Bista; Bhaktapur, Nepal	Neha Paudel; Birgunj, Nepal
2012	Nagma Shrestha; Kathmandu, Nepal	Subeksha Khadka; Lalitpur, Nepal	Neelam Chand; Mahendranagar, Nepal	Bandana Tandukar; Lalitpur, Nepal
2013	Rojisha Shahi; Dhapakhel, Nepal	Shritima Shah; Kathmandu, Nepal	Sipora Gurung; Pokhara, Nepal	Sumi Lama Moktan; Kavre, Nepal
2014	Sonie Rajbhandari; Pokhara, Nepal	Aastha Pokharel; Kathmandu, Nepal	Pranayna KC; Lalitpur, Nepal	Sitoshna Ban; Chitwan, Nepal
2015	Dibyata Vaidya; Kathmandu, Nepal	Medha Koirala; Biratnagar, Nepal	Nishma Chaudhary; Dharan, Nepal	Sristee Bhattarai; Kathmandu, Nepal
2016	Roshni Khatri; Lalitpur, Nepal	Barsha Lekhi; Saptari, Nepal	Srijana Regmi; Sankhuwasabha, Nepal	Namrata Shrestha; Kathmandu, Nepal
2017	Rojina Shrestha; Kathmandu, Nepal	Niti Shah; Dang, Nepal	Sahara Basnet; Lalitpur, Nepal	Manzari Singh; Tansen, Nepal
2018	Manita Devkota; Gorkha, Nepal	Priya Sigdel; Kathmandu, Nepal	Ronali Amatya; Kathmandu, Nepal	Mahima Singh; Kathmandu, Nepal
2019	Pradeepta Adhikari; Kathmandu, Nepal	Riya Basnet; Kathmandu, Nepal	Meera Kakshapati; Bhaktapur, Nepal	Rose Lama; Kathmandu, Nepal
2020	Supriya Shrestha; Kathmandu, Nepal	Sandhya Sharma; Mahottari, Nepal	Shimal Kanaujiya; Kathmandu, Nepal	Merisa Singh Suwal; Kathmandu, Nepal
2022	Sareesha Shrestha; Kathmandu, Nepal	Nancy Khadka; Biratnagar, Nepal	Rose Kandel; Kathmandu, Nepal	Susmita Bogati; Bhaktapur, Nepal
2023	Raina Majgaya; Dang, Nepal	Prasiddhy Shah; Lalitpur, Nepal	Aishworya Shrestha; Kathmandu, Nepal	Grishma Adhikari; Dhading, Nepal
