= Miss Nepal 2024 =

Beauty pageant in Nepal

- Date: 3 August 2024
- Presenters: Sahana Bajracharya; Priyanka Rani Joshi; Sareesha Shrestha; Nancy Khadka
- Venue: Godavari Sunrise Convention Center, Lalitpur, Nepal
- Broadcaster: Himalaya TV
- Entrants: 26
- Placements: 13
- Winner: Ashma Kumari KC; Miss Nepal World (Did not compete)
- Miss Nepal Earth: Sumana KC; Chitwan
- Miss Nepal International: Karuna Rawat; Tanahun

The Hidden Treasures Dabur Vatika Shampoo Miss Nepal 2024 was the 28th Miss Nepal pageant held on 3 August 2024 at the Godavari Sunrise Convention Center, Lalitpur. The Nepalese delegates for Miss Earth 2024 and Miss International 2024 were crowned at the end of the event. Miss Nepal World 2024 did not participate in Miss World pageant.

The grand coronation event was shown live exclusively on Official YouTube Channel of The Hidden Treasure and Himalaya TV.

== Regional auditions ==
To ensure that the pageant is inclusive and representative of all regions, the audition covered all seven Provinces of Nepal. Regional auditions were to be held in Province No. 1, Madhesh Province, Bagmati Province, Gandaki Province, Lumbini Province, Karnali Province, and Sudurpashchim Province. The final audition in Kathmandu was to be held on 18 May 2024 at the Park Village Hotel in Budhanilkantha, Nepal. The selected Top 23 finalists were scheduled to compete at the grand coronation event of Miss Nepal 2024 on 3 August 2024.

List of the main events in the Miss Nepal 2024 beauty pageant
Province	Date	Event	Venue	Number of Delegates	Ref.
Bagmati Province	12 April 2024	Miss Chitwan 2024	Bharatpur Garden Resort, Chitwan	1	
Gandaki Province	17 April 2024	Miss Pokhara 2024	Waterfront Resort, Phewa Lake	5	
Lumbini Province	22 April 2024	Miss Nepalgunj 2024	Hotel Siddhartha, Nepalgunj	0	
Karnali Province	24 April 2024	Miss Surkhet 2024	Siddhartha Sunny Resort, Surkhet	1	
Madhesh Province	28 April 2024	Miss Birgunj 2024	Hotel Vishuwa, Birgunj	1	
Koshi Province	5 May 2024	Miss Biratmode 2024	Siddhartha Hotel, Biratmode	1	
Koshi Province	7 May 2024	Miss Itahari 2024	Royal Resort, Itahari	0	
Lumbini Province	12 May 2024	Miss Bhairahawa2024	Siddhartha Villasa, Bhairahawa	1	
Bagmati Province	18 May 2024	Miss Kathmandu 2024	Hotel Himalaya,Lalitpur	16	

Affiliated Pageant Partners
Pageant	Contestants
Miss Hong Kong Nepal 2023	Hong Kong – Anjana Pun
Miss Koshi Pradesh 2024	Nepal – TBA
Miss Nepal Europe	Finland – TBA
Miss Nepal North America	New York – TBA
Miss Western Nepal	Nepal – TBA

== Challenge events ==
=== Head-to-Head Challenge ===
==== Round 1 ====
- Advanced to Round 2 of the Head-to-Head Challenge.

Group	Contestant 1	Contestant 2	Contestant 3	Contestant 4	Contestant 5	Contestant 6
1	Subekshya Karki	Sumana KC	Roshni Dahal	Ambika Rana	Anisha Malla	
2	Nivita Chapagain	Prashuna Bhusal	Lalita Sherbuja	Saamin Koirala	Dikshya Awasthi	
3	Ashma Kumari KC	Irina Shrestha	Urja Newa	Saira Khadka	Preravita Swar	
4	Kimti Shrestha	Radhika Thapa	Samikshya Niraula	Simrika Manandhar	Karuna Rawat	
5	Anjana Pun	Eva Giri	Shraddha Silwal	Aanchal Khatri	Drishti Thapa	Puja Baral

=== Round 2 ===
- Advanced to the Top 12 via judges' choice.

Group	Contestant 1
1	Sumana KC
2	Nivita Chapagain
3	Saira Khadka
4	Samikshya Niraula
5	Shraddha Silwal

== Results ==
=== Placements ===
Color keys

- The contestant Won in an International pageant.
- The contestant was a Runner-up in an International pageant.
- The contestant was a Semi-Finalist in an International pageant.
- The contestant assumed another title.
- The contestant was not able to compete in an International pageant.
- The contestant did not place but won a Special Award in the pageant.
- The contestant did not place.

Placement	Contestant	International placement
Miss Nepal World 2024	Ashma Kumari KC - Kathmandu	Did not participate in Miss World due to age out
Miss Nepal Earth 2024	Sumana KC - Chitwan	Unplaced – Miss Earth 2024
Miss Nepal International 2024	Karuna Rawat - Tanahun	Unplaced – Miss International 2024
Top 6	Simrika Manandhar - Kathmandu; Preravita Swar - Bardiya; Shraddha Suman Silwal - Kathmandu	
Top 13	Ambika Rana – Pokhara; Anisha Malla – Kathmandu; Anjana Pun – Pokhara ●; Irina Shrestha – Kathmandu; Kimti Shrestha – Kathmandu; Nivita Chapagain – Kalaiya; Saamin Koirala – Biratnagar	

(●): The candidate is the winner of Miss Popular Choice (online voting) and got direct entry into Top 13 Semi-Finalists.

=== Special awards ===
Special Awards	Winner
Vatsalya Miss Visionary - 5 July	Saira Khadka
Yeti Airlines Women with Wings - 11 July	Kimti Shrestha
Brij Cement Miss Confident - 20 July	Preravita Swar
Cetaphil Miss Healthy Skin - 20 July	Simrika Manandhar
Creative D Miss Photogenic - 20 July	Shraddha Suman Silwal
Farmasi Face of the Year - 20 July	Ashma Kumari KC
The Hidden Treasure Miss Beauty with a Purpose - 20 July	Sumana KC
Zuvara Miss Hygiene - 20 July	Sumana KC
Miss DHI - 20 July	Anjana Pun
Miss BYD Miss Green Visionary- 23 July	Ambika Rana
Dabur Honey Miss Fitness Queen - 24 July	Urja Newa
The Kathmandu Post Miss Intellectual - 29 July	Dikshya Awasthi
Berger Miss Silk	Ashma Kumari KC
Real Miss Popular Choice	Anjana Pun

== Contestants ==
26 contestants competed for the title.

Representing	Contestant	Age (Note: Ages at the time of the pageant)	Height	Education
Palpa	Subekshya Karki	20	5 ft 4 in (1.63 m)	Bachelor of Science in CS and IT
Kathmandu	Ashma Kumari KC	26	5 ft 5 in (1.65 m)	Bachelor’s in Social Work
Chitwan	Sumana KC	25	5 ft 6 in (1.68 m)	Bachelors in Dental Surgery
Kalaiya	Nivita Chapagain	TBA	5 ft 7.5 in (1.71 m)	Final year dental surgery Undergraduate
Lalitpur	Simrika Manandhar	TBA	5 ft 6 in (1.68 m)	Bachelors in Economics
Kathmandu	Aanchal Khatri	23	5 ft 4 in (1.63 m)	Bachelor’s in information system
Lalitpur	Urja Newa	TBA	5 ft 4.5 in (1.64 m)	Masters in Media Studies
Tanahun	Karuna Rawat	24	5 ft 4.5 in (1.64 m)	Bachelor of Nursing
Pokhara	Anjana Pun	26	5 ft 9 in (1.75 m)	5 years as a teaching assistant
Lalitpur	Radhika Thapa	TBA	5 ft 5.5 in (1.66 m)	Bachelors of Science in Nursing
Kathmandu	Eva Giri	20	5 ft 4.5 in (1.64 m)	Bachelor of Business Administration
Dailekh	Drishti Thapa	TBA	5 ft 5.7 in (1.67 m)	Masters in political science
Kailali	Dikshya Awasthi	22	5 ft 8 in (1.73 m)	Bachelor of Arts Bachelor of Law
Kathmandu	Irina Shrestha	25	5 ft 6.5 in (1.69 m)	Bachelor’s degree in Business Studies
Myagdi	Lalita Sherbuja	25	5 ft 6 in (1.68 m)	Bachelor of Accounting
Sindhupalchowk	Kimti Shrestha	22	5 ft 5 in (1.65 m)	Computing Software
Bardiya	Preravita Swar	21	5 ft 6.6 in (1.69 m)	Bachelor’s in Social Work
Hetauda	Roshni Dahal	22	5 ft 6 in (1.68 m)	Bachelor’s in Computer Application
Bhaktapur	Samikshya Niraula	TBA	5 ft 3 in (1.60 m)	Bsc hons computing (IT)
Kathmandu	Prashuna Bhusal	TBA	5 ft 5.5 in (1.66 m)	Bachelor's degree in Law and Economics
Pokhara	Puja Baral	TBA	5 ft 4 in (1.63 m)	Smart Computing
Dolakha	Saira Khadka	TBA	5 ft 6.7 in (1.69 m)	Bachelor in Science Psychology and Neuroscience
Pokhara	Ambika Rana	24	5 ft 7 in (1.70 m)	Business and Innovative Medicine
Kathmandu	Anisha Malla	24	5 ft 7 in (1.70 m)	Bachelors in Ethical hacking and Cybersecurity
Lalitpur	Shraddha Suman Silwal	TBA	5 ft 8 in (1.73 m)	BBA-Finance
Biratnagar	Saamin Koirala	18	5 ft 7.5 in (1.71 m)	Undergraduate Fashion Designing

== International representation ==
- Although Miss Nepal World 2023 Srichchha Pradhan is set to crown her successor this August, 2024. She has not participated in the international pageant Miss World, as it was delayed for nearly about a year back in 2021. Hence, Pradhan will represent Nepal at Miss World 2025 despite having crowned her successor.
- Miss Earth Nepal 2023 Raina Majgaiya and Miss International Nepal 2023 Prasiddhy Shah have already participated in their respective international pageants. Therefore, their successors are next in the line and will compete in Miss Earth 2024 and Miss International 2024.
- Ashma KC did not participate in the 73rd Miss World, as the Miss Nepal Organization announced in their congratulatory post that the newly crowned Miss Nepal World 2025 will represent Nepal in the pageant, which was later confirmed by the Miss World Organization.

== Previous pageants ==
- Ambika Rana was Miss Grand Nepal 2020 winner and represented Nepal at Miss Grand International 2020.
- Anjana Pun was crowned Miss Hong Kong Nepal 2023 and Miss Magar Hong Kong 2014 winner.
- Karuna Rawat was Miss SEE Pokhara 2014 2nd Runner-Up.
- Lalita Sherbuja was Miss SEE Pokhara 2016 1st Runner-Up.
- Puja Baral won Image Channel Mega Model Season 4.
- Samikshya Niraula is Miss Teen International (India) Nepal 2022.
- Later, Dikshya Awasthi participated in Miss National 2025 where she emerged as a winner and make her representative for Miss Supranational Nepal 2025. She become first nepali to get placement in Miss Supranational pageant, after entering top 24 in Miss Supranational 2025.
