= Miss Nepal =

National beauty pageant in Nepal

Miss Nepal; मिस नेपाल
- The Hidden Treasure Miss Nepal
- Logo of the Miss Nepal Beauty Pageant.
- Formation: 14 October 1994; 32 years ago
- Type: Beauty pageant
- Headquarters: Kathmandu
- Location: Nepal
- Members: Current Franchise; Miss World; Miss Cosmo; Miss International
- Official language: Nepali; English
- Board of directors: Ajay Sthapit; Diwakar Rajkarnikar; Gopal Kakshapati; Pramod Kansakar; Subarna Chhetri
- Parent organization: The Hidden Treasure (THT)
- Website: missnepal.com.np

Miss Nepal (Nepali: मिस नेपाल) is a national beauty pageant in Nepal. The winners represent Nepal at Miss World, Miss Cosmo, Miss International beauty pageants. It is organized by The Hidden Treasure (THT) Pvt. Ltd, so the pageant is also known as THT Miss Nepal.

== History ==
Current Franchises
| Membership | Year |
|---|---|
| Miss World | 1994- present |
| Miss Cosmo | 2025-present |
| Miss International | 2000, 2005, 2010-present |
Former Franchises
| Membership | Year |
| Miss Universe | 2017-2020 |
| Miss Supranational | 2016, 2018-2021 |
| Miss Asia Pacific International | 1994-2005, 2016-2017 |
| Miss Earth | 2002-2025 |

From the first pageant in 1994, the winner of the Miss Nepal has represented Nepal at Miss Asia Pacific. After 1997, the Hidden Treasures collaborated with Kathmandu Jaycees and formed two pageants of Kathmandu Jacyees Miss Nepal and Hidden Treasures Miss World Nepal. From 1998 onwards, the winner of Miss Nepal has been sent to Miss World contest and the first runner-up to Miss Asia Pacific. No contest was held in 2001 due to the Nepalese royal massacre.

From 2004, the second runner-up represented Nepal at Miss Earth. This changed in 2005, to first runner-up, as they stopped sending delegates to Miss Asia Pacific. From 2010, the second runner-up was sent to Miss International. For 2016-2017, The Hidden Treasure reacquired the franchise of Miss Asia Pacific International. In 2017, Hidden Treasure acquired Miss Universe franchise and elected Nagma Shrestha as the First Miss Universe Nepal 2017 and in 2018 it acquired Miss Supranational franchise. From 2018 onwards, all the national titleholders became equivalent to winners with no runners up.

In 2020, Hidden Treasure announced that they no longer had the Miss Universe franchise. The organizer announced on 20 March 2020, that the contest had been postponed due to the (COVID-19) pandemic, as informed by Chairman of Hidden Treasure Mr. Driwakar Rajkarnikar. Later the pageant was conducted on 5 December 2020.

In 2022, Miss Nepal lost the franchise of Miss Supranational. Now, Mister and Miss National Nepal (Santosh Upadhyaya Directorship) sends Nepalese delegates to Supranational pageant. In 2025, THT acquired the license for Miss Cosmo Nepal (previously held by Miss Vibhaa). In 2026, THT discontinued the Miss Earth franchise.

=== Competition ===
Since 1994, women from 19–24 years old compete at the national pageant, Miss Nepal. The auditions are held throughout the country in provincial levels or city levels. 25 contestants are chosen from across the country and they begin a one-month training and grooming course before the final event in which they participate in lectures, social work, photoshoots, interviews and etiquette lessons. Along with 25 selected contestants, one preliminary pageant winner is directly advanced to training phase, making the total contestants number 26.

On the coronation night, which lasts up to three hours, all the candidates engage in an opening sequence, introduction speech (after which the top 12 semi-finalists are chosen who then compete in an interview portion with the judges), and an evening gown sequence, where the 5 finalists are chosen. This is when the final common question and answer round is held. At the end, the names of winners are announced from the grand final show, live telecasted on the selected broadcast partner.

=== Controversial contestants ===
- 1998 Winner Jyoti Pradhan was dethroned when it was discovered that she had fled to the US after she finish competed in Miss World 1998. Therefore, 1st runner-up Niru Shrestha Gurung was crowned first place.
- Miss Nepal 2010 - 3rd Runner Up, Samriddhi Rai accused the organizers of preferential treatment towards contestants and claimed the contest was purely a money-making business. However, former Miss Nepal titleholders stood with Miss Nepal pageant and dismissed Rai's claims.
- 2012 Contestant Rashmita Maharjan was injured during the scooter practice, resulting her to quit the contest. She later, came back in 2014 contest and made it to Top 10 semi-finalist.
- Miss Nepal Earth 2014 Prinsha Shrestha was the second Miss Nepal to be dethroned due to breaking the rules from her contract with Hidden Treasure by competing in Miss Eco Queens 2015 pageant. 2nd runner-up Sonie Rajbhandari was then given the title of Miss Nepal Earth 2014 (1st runner-up).

=== Winners' gallery ===
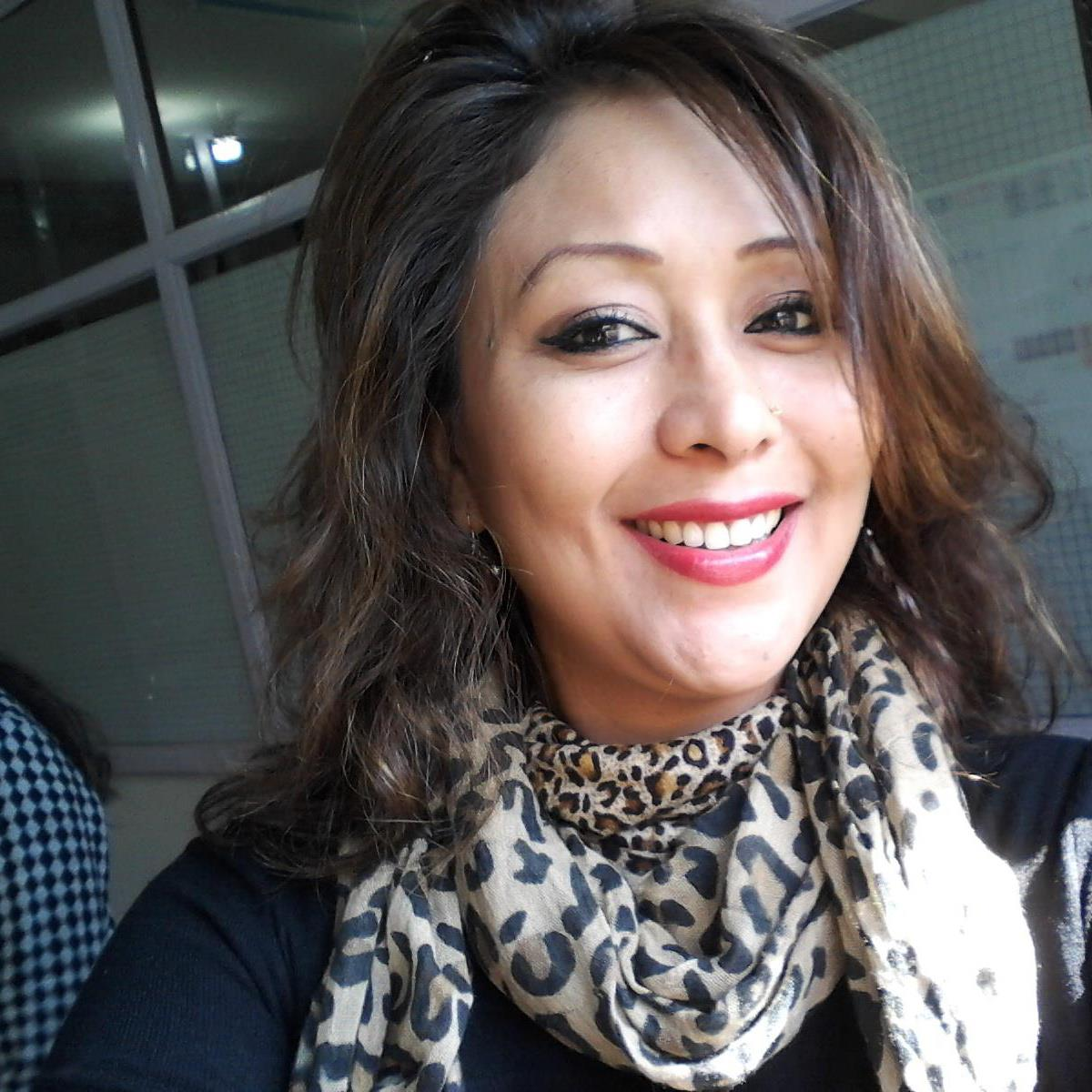
Miss Nepal 1994
Ruby Rana, Birgunj

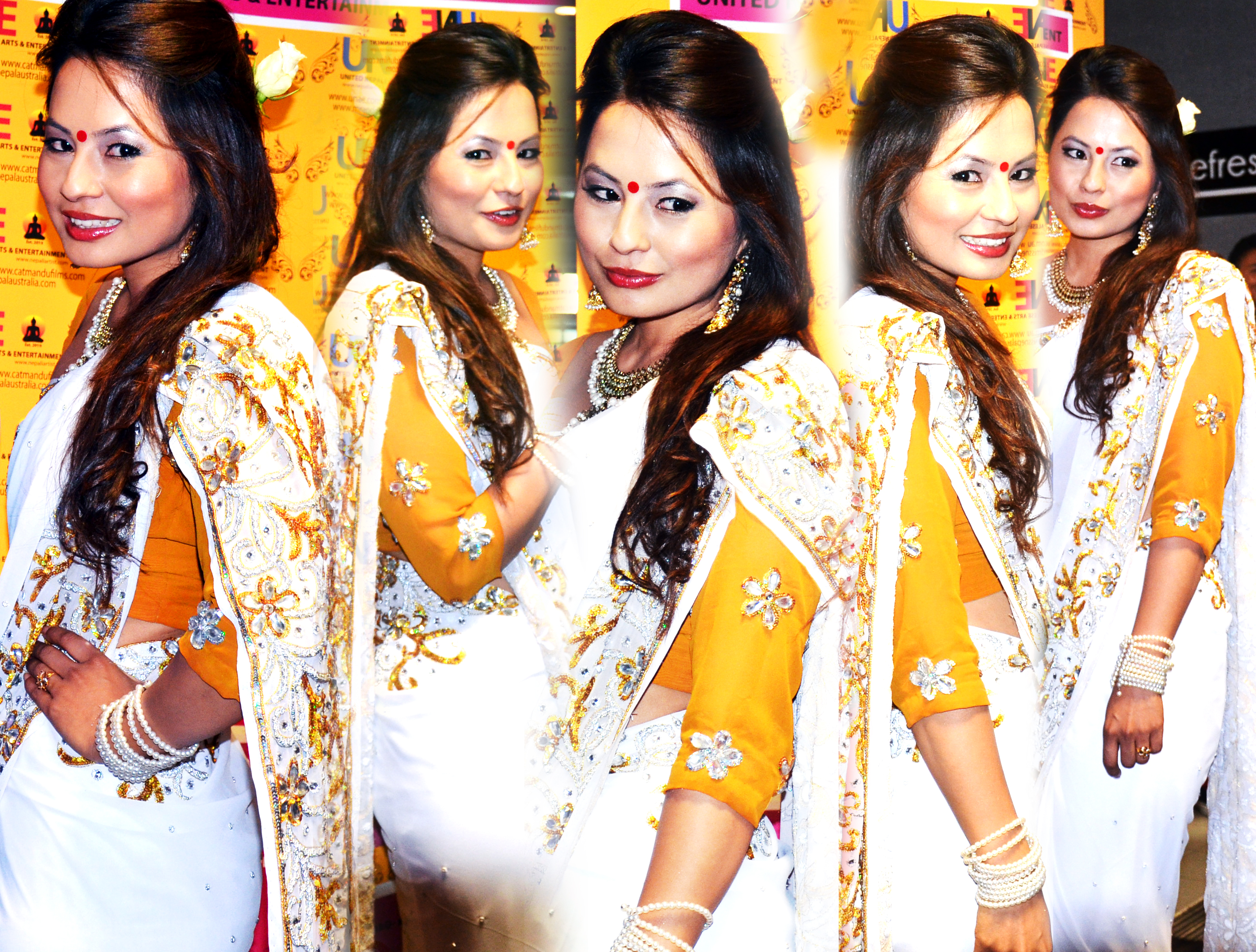
Miss Nepal 2002
Malvika Subba, Kathmandu

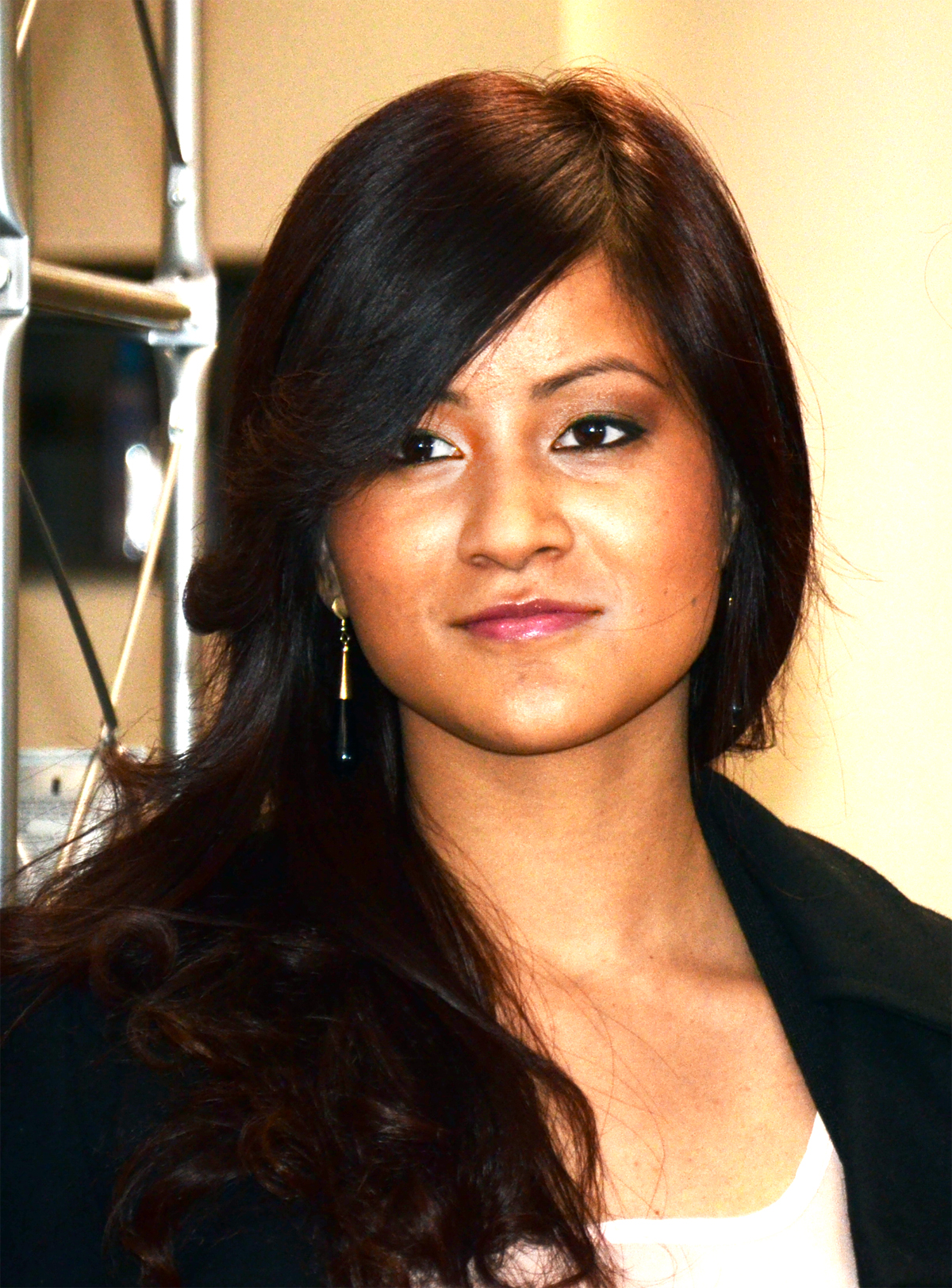
Miss Nepal World 2004
Payal Shakya, Kathmandu

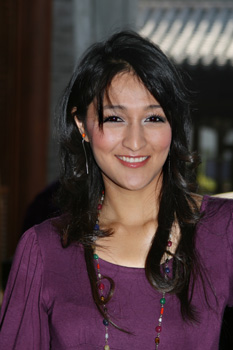
Miss Nepal World 2007
Sitashma Chand, Lalitpur

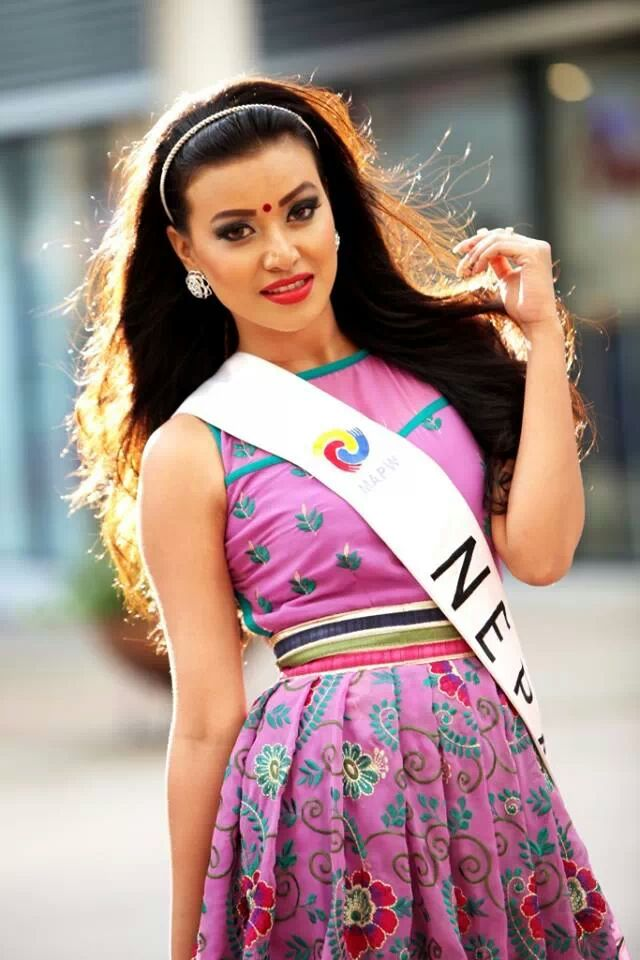
Miss Nepal World 2011
Malina Joshi, Dharan

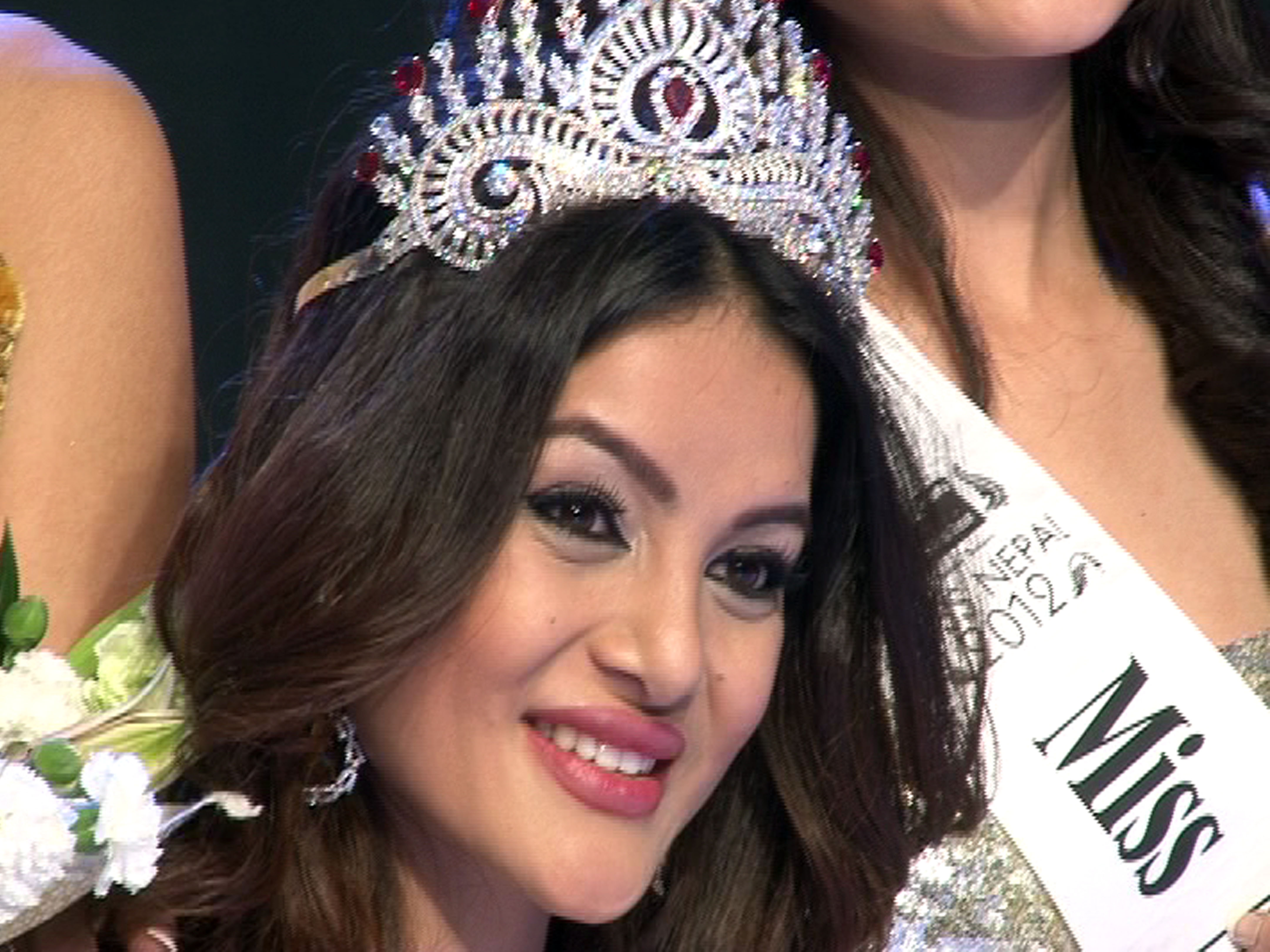
Miss Nepal World 2012
Shristi Shrestha, Chitwan

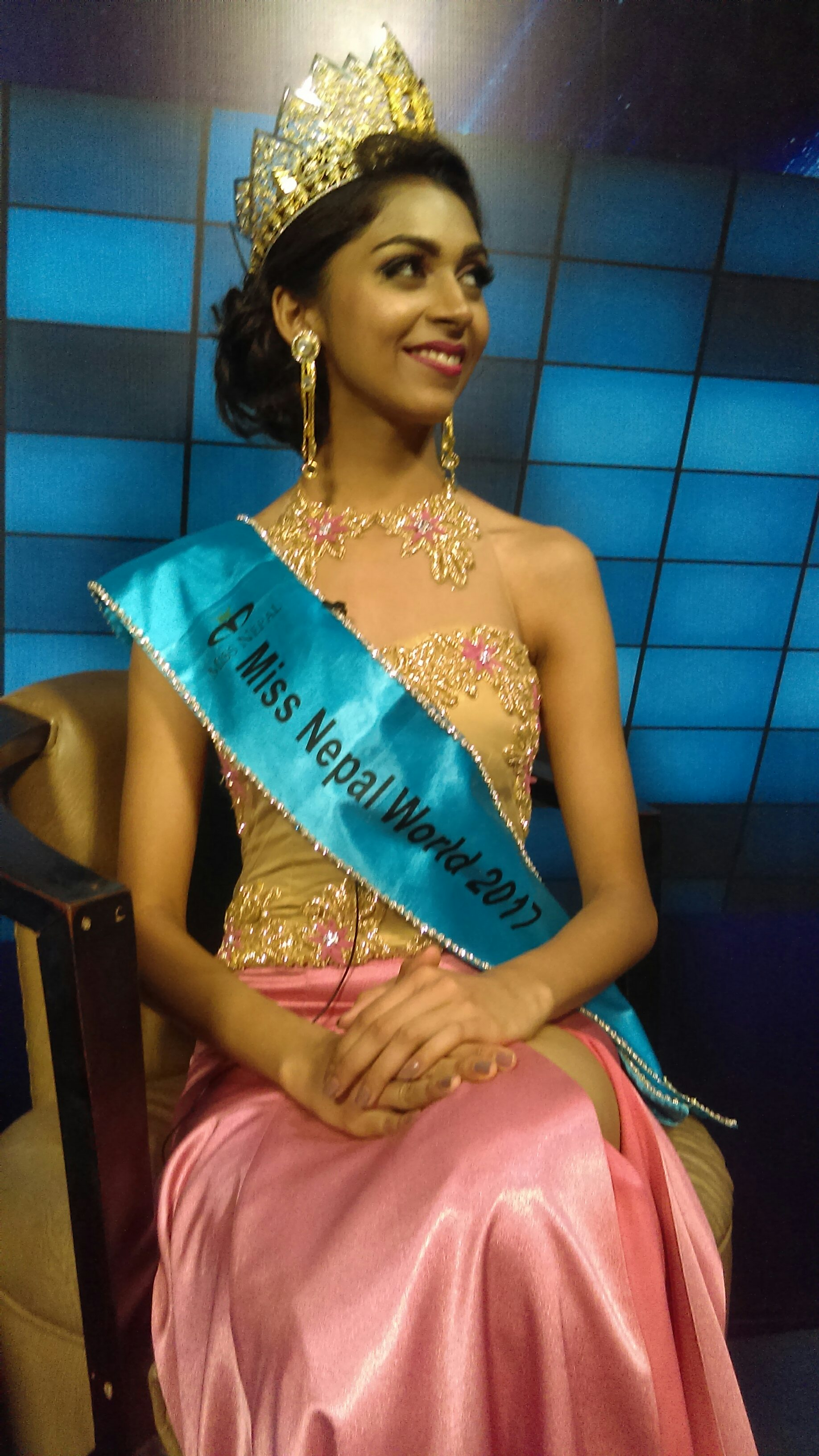
Miss Nepal World 2017
Nikita Chandak, Urlabari

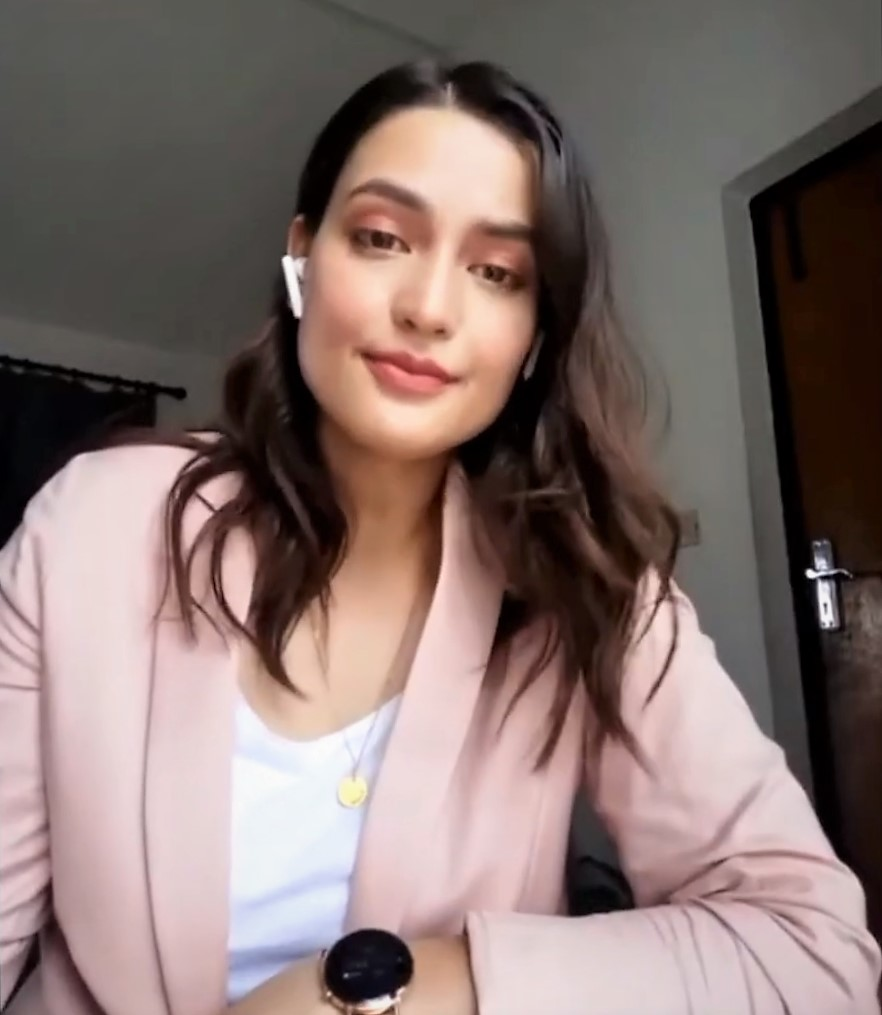
Miss Universe Nepal 2018
Manita Devkota, Gorkha

== Titleholders at Miss Nepal ==
=== Title Winners ===
Winning International Title
Miss Universe Nepal
Miss World Nepal
Miss Asia Pacific Nepal
Miss International Nepal
Miss Earth Nepal
Miss Supranational Nepal

| Year | Miss Nepal Asia Pacific | 1st Runner Up | 2nd Runner Up | 3rd Runner Up | 4th Runner Up |
| 1994 | Ruby Rana; Birgunj | Dechen Dolkar Lama; Kathmandu | Latika Maskey; Dharan | Annu Radha Pudusaini; Lalitpur | Indira Thapa; Kathmandu |
| 1995 | Sumi Khadka; Kathmandu | Rita Gurung; Pokhara | Trishna Kunwar; Lumbini | Pabina Khadka; Lalitpur | Jasmina KC; Kathmandu |
| 1996 | Poonam Ghimire; Kathmandu | Kalpana Noreen Gurung; Kathmandu | Nirmala Basnet; Kathmandu | Shova Chand; Baitadi | Jasmina KC; Kathmandu |
| 1997 | Nilima Gurung; Pokhara | Charu Shree Joshi; Lalitpur | Sarita Gyawali; Bardiya | Neema Tamang; Kathmandu | Charu Shree Joshi; Lalitpur |
| 1997 | Miss World Nepal | 1st Runner Up | | 2nd Runner Up | |
| 1997 | Jharana Bajracharya; Kathmandu | Meenakshi Vandana Sharma; Kathmandu | | Chandani Shrestha; Kathmandu | |
| 1998-2004 | Miss Nepal World | Miss Nepal Asia Pacific | Runners Up | | |
| 1998 | Jyoti Pradhan (Dethorned) | Niru Shrestha Gurung; Kathmandu | Kriti Shrestha; Dharan | Prabha Amatya; Kathmandu | Sunjita Ranjit; Pokhara |
| 1999 | Shweta Singh; Kathmandu | Nikita Bhandari Kshatriya; Kathmandu | Kriti Shrestha; Pokhara | Nutan Sharma; Jhapa | Prakriti Devkota; Kathmandu |
| 2000 | Usha Khadgi; Birgunj | Biva Maya Ranjeet; Kathmandu | Smriti Singh; Kathmandu | Aishwarya Basnet; Lalitpur | Rajeswori Shrestha; Kathmandu |
| 2002 | Malvika Subba; Kathmandu | Pinky Shah; Kathmandu | Lhama Yangchen Sherpa; Bardiya | Suchitra Acharya; Kathmandu | Aparna Shah; Lalitpur |
| 2002 | Malvika Subba; Kathmandu | Pinky Shah; Kathmandu | Nira Gautam; Lalitpur | Suchitra Acharya; Kathmandu | Aparna Shah; Lalitpur |
| 2003 | Priti Sitoula; Kathmandu | Prerana Shah; Kathmandu | Numa Rai; Lalitpur | Ramani Joshi; Kathmandu | Rupa Upadhyay; Kathmandu |
| 2004 | Payal Shakya; Kathmandu | Sarah Gurung; Kathmandu | Anita Gurung; Pokhara | Harina Bogati; Kathmandu | Mamta Malhotra; Kathmandu |
| 2005-2009 | Miss Nepal World | Miss Nepal Earth | 2nd Runner Up | 3rd Runner Up | 4th Runner Up |
| 2005 | Sugarika KC; Lalitpur | Shavona Shrestha; Kathmandu | Ayushma Pokharel; Kathmandu | Bilena Malla; Kathmandu | Pratiksha Moktan; Kathmandu |
| 2007 | Sitashma Chand; Lalitpur | Bandana Sharma; Lalitpur | Shweta Shah; Lalitpur | Babita Manandhar; Kathmandu | Bibha Prajapati; Kathmandu |
| 2009 | Zenisha Moktan; Kathmandu | Richa Thapa Magar; Kathmandu | Kunchhang Moktan Tamang; Kathmandu | Aayusha Karki; Kathmandu | Reetu Shakya; Lalitpur |
| 2010-2017 | Miss Nepal World | Miss Nepal Earth | Miss Nepal International | Top 5 Contestants | |
| 2010 | Sadichha Shrestha Moktan; Kathmandu | Sahana Bajracharya; Surkhet | Sanyukta Timsina; Kathmandu | Samriddhi Rai; Lalitpur | Ajita Singh; Kathmandu |
| 2011 | Malina Joshi; Dharan | Anupama Aura Gurung; Chitwan | Sarina Maskey; Narayangarh | Manisha Bista; Bhaktapur | Neha Paudel; Birgunj |
| 2012 | Shrishti Shrestha; Chitwan | Nagma Shrestha; Kathmandu | Subeksha Khadka; Lalitpur | Neelam Chand; Mahendranagar | Bandana Tandukar; Lalitpur |
| 2013 | Ishani Shrestha; Kathmandu | Rojisha Shahi; Dhapakhel | Shritima Shah; Kathmandu | Sipora Gurung; Pokhara | Sumi Lama Moktan; Kavre |
| 2014 | Subin Limbu; Dharan | Prinsha Shrestha (Dethorned) | Sonie Rajbhandari; Pokhara | Aastha Pokharel; Kathmandu | Pranaya KC; Kathmandu |
| 2015 | Evana Manandhar; Kathmandu | Dibyata Vaidya; Kathmandu | Medha Koirala; Biratnagar | Nishma Chaudhary; Dharan | Sristee Bhattarai; Kathmandu |
| 2016 | Asmi Shrestha; Chitwan | Roshni Khatri; Lalitpur | Barsha Lekhi; Saptari | Srijana Regmi; Sankhuwasabha | Namrata Shrestha; Kathmandu |
| 2017 | Nikita Chandak; Urlabari | Rojina Shrestha; Kathmandu | Niti Shah; Dang | Sahara Basnet; Lalitpur (Asia Pacific) | Manzari Singh; Tansen |
| 2017-2019 | Miss Universe Nepal | Miss Nepal World | Miss Nepal Earth | Miss Nepal International | Miss Nepal Supranational |
| 2017 | Nagma Shrestha; Kathmandu | Miss Universe Nepal 2017 was appointed after completion of Miss Nepal 2017 | | | |
| 2018 | Manita Devkota; Gorkha | Shrinkhala Khatiwada; Hetauda | Priya Sigdel; Kathmandu | Ronali Amatya; Kathmandu | Mahima Singh; Kathmandu |
| 2019 | Pradeepta Adhikari; Kathmandu | Anushka Shrestha; Kathmandu | Riya Basnet; Kathmandu | Meera Kakshapati; Bhaktapur | Rose Lama; Kathmandu |
| 2020-2024 | Miss Nepal World | Miss Nepal Earth | Miss Nepal International | Top 5 | |
| 2020 | Namrata Shrestha; Chandragiri | Supriya Shrestha; Kathmandu | Sandhya Sharma; Mahottari | Shimal Kanaujiya; Kathmandu (Supranational) | Merisa Singh Suwal; Kathmandu |
| 2022 | Priyanka Rani Joshi; Kathmandu | Sareesha Shrestha; Kathmandu | Nancy Khadka; Biratnagar | Rose Kandel; Kathmandu | Susmita Bogati; Bhaktapur |
| 2023 | Srichchha Pradhan; Kathmandu | Raina Majgaya; Dang | Prasiddhy Shah; Lalitpur | Aishworya Shrestha; Kathmandu | Grishma Adhikari; Dhading |
| 2024 | Ashma Kumari KC; Kathmandu | Sumana KC; Chitwan | Karuna Rawat; Tanahun | Simrika Manandhar; Kathmandu | Preravika Swar; Kathmandu |
| 2025-present | Miss Nepal World | Miss Nepal Cosmo | Miss Nepal International | Miss Nepal Earth | |
| 2025 | Luna Luitel; Kathmandu | Deepshika Nepal; Jhapa | Urusha Bhandari; Achham | Sony Ghale; Rasuwa | - |
| 2026 | Deepmala Dhakal; Hong Kong | Kashis Subba; Dharan | Arya Nishaant; Lalitpur | - | - |

- Miss World 2002 beauty pageant was held on the same date as Miss Nepal 2002, Malvika Subba was unable to compete at the international competition.
- Miss Nepal World 2024 Aashma Kumari KC did not get to represent at 73rd Miss World 2026.

== International Placements ==
=== Current Franchise ===
The following women have represented Nepal in the international franchise held by THT Miss Nepal

- : Declared as Winner
- : Ended as runner-up or top 5/6 qualification
- : Ended as one of the finalists or semifinalists
- : Ended as special awards winner/ qualifier

==== Miss World Nepal ====
After the local franchise for the Miss World pageant in 1997, Miss Nepal have started to send its winner. In 2002, the pageant was held in December which was after the Miss World 2002, hence the Miss Nepal 2002 winner, Malvika Subba missed the opportunity to represent Nepal in the Miss World pageant. On occasion, when the winner does not qualify (due to age) for either contest, a runner-up is sent.

| Year | District | Miss Nepal | Placement at Miss World | Special Awards | Notes |
|---|---|---|---|---|---|
| 2027 | Kathmandu | Deepmala Dhakal | TBA | | |
| 2026 | Kathmandu | Luna Luitel | Unplaced | - | |
| 2025 | Kathmandu | Srichchha Pradhan | Unplaced | | |
| 2024 | No competition held | | | | |
| 2023 | Kathmandu | Priyanka Rani Joshi | Top 40 | Beauty with a Purpose (Asia and Oceania); Sports (Top 32); Head to Head Challenge (Top 25) | |
| ~~2022~~ | Miss World 2021 was rescheduled to 16 March 2022 due to the COVID-19 pandemic outbreak in Puerto Rico, no edition started in 2022 | | | | |
| 2021 | Kathmandu | Namrata Shrestha | Top 40 | Head to Head Challenge; Beauty With a Purpose (Top 10) | |
| ~~2020~~ | Due to the impact of COVID-19 pandemic, no pageant in 2020 | | | | |
| 2019 | Kathmandu | Anushka Shrestha | Top 12 | Beauty with a Purpose; Miss Multimedia; Head to head Challenge | |
| 2018 | Makwanpur | Shrinkhala Khatiwada | Top 12 | Beauty with a Purpose; Miss Multimedia | |
| 2017 | Morang | Nikita Chandak | Top 40 | Beauty With a Purpose (Top 20); Miss Multimedia (2nd Runner-up); People's Choice award (Top 5) | |
| 2016 | Chitwan | Asmi Shrestha | Unplaced | Beauty with a Purpose (Top 5) | Face of Classic Diamond 2004 |
| 2015 | Kathmandu | Evana Manandhar | Unplaced | Beauty with a Purpose (Top 10); Dance of the World (Top 7) | |
| 2014 | Sunsari | Subin Limbu | Unplaced | People's Choice award (Top 10) | |
| 2013 | Kathmandu | Ishani Shrestha | Top 10 | Beauty with a Purpose; Miss Multimedia (2nd Runner-up) | |
| 2012 | Chitwan | Shristi Shrestha | Top 30 | Beach Beauty (Top 10); Miss Multimedia (Top 10) | |
| 2011 | Sunsari | Malina Joshi | Unplaced | Beauty With a Purpose (Top 10) | |
| 2010 | Kathmandu | Sadichha Shrestha | Unplaced | | |
| 2009 | Kathmandu | Zenisha Moktan | Unplaced | | |
| 2008 | Did not compete | | | | |
| 2007 | Lalitpur | Sitashma Chand | Unplaced | | |
| 2006 | Did not compete | | | | |
| 2005 | Lalitpur | Sugarika KC | Unplaced | | |
| 2004 | Kathmandu | Payal Shakya | Unplaced | | |
| 2003 | Kathmandu | Priti Stioula | Unplaced | | |
| 2002 | Sunsari | Malvika Subba | Unplaced | | |
| 2001 | Did not compete | | | | |
| 2000 | Parsa | Usha Khadgi | Unplaced | | |
| 1999 | Kathmandu | Shewta Singh | Unplaced | | |
| 1998 | Kathmandu | Niru Shrestha | Unplaced | | |
| 1998 | Kathmandu | Jyoti Pradhan | Dethroned after found unable to full fill her duties as the reigning Miss Nepal | | |
| 1997 | Kathmandu | Jharana Bajracharya | Unplaced | | |

==== Miss Cosmo Nepal ====
THT Affiliation: 2025- present.

| Year | District | Miss Nepal | Placement at Miss Csomo | Special Awards | Notes |
|---|---|---|---|---|---|
| 2025 | Jhapa | Deepshikha Nepal | Unplaced | The T.E.A Cosmo Carnival Show (Top 10); Cosmo Impactful Beauty Award (Top 10) | |

==== Miss International Nepal ====
Before 2010, Miss Nepal International was organised by different company which produced winners that were represented in Miss International beauty pageant. But since 2010, Hidden Treasure bought the franchise to Miss International and now sends delegate from the annual Miss Nepal beauty pageant.

| Year | District | Miss Nepal | Placement at Miss International | Special Awards | Notes |
|---|---|---|---|---|---|
| 2026 | Lalitpur | Arya Nishaant | TBA | | |
| 2025 | Achham | Urusha Bhandari | Unplaced | | |
| 2024 | Tanahun | Karuna Rawat | Unplaced | | |
| 2023 | Lalitpur | Prasiddhy Shah | Unplaced | | |
| 2022 | Biratnagar | Nancy Khadka | Unplaced | | |
| 2020-2021 | Mahottari | Sandhya Sharma | Due to impact of COVID 19, no international pageant in 2020-2021. | | |
| 2019 | Bhaktapur | Meera Kakshapati | Unplaced | | |
| 2018 | Kathmandu | Ronali Amatya | Unplaced | | Model Hunt Nepal 2016, Miss Eco International Nepal 2017 |
| 2017 | Dang | Niti Shah | Unplaced | | Face of House of Fashion Season 1 (1st Runner-up) |
| 2016 | Saptari | Barsha Lekhi | Unplaced | People's choice award - Missosology | |
| 2015 | Morang | Medha Koirala | Unplaced | | |
| 2014 | Kaski | Sonie Rajbhandari | Unplaced | | |
| 2013 | Kathmandu | Shritima Shah | Unplaced | | |
| 2012 | Lalitpur | Subeksha Khadka | Unplaced | | |
| 2011 | Kathmandu | Sarina Maskey | Unplaced | | |
| 2010 | Kathmandu | Sanyukta Timsina | Unplaced | | |
Did not compete between 2006—2009
| 2005 | Kathmandu | Nisha Adhikari | Unplaced | | |
Did not compete between 2001—2004
| 2000 | Kathmandu | Uma Bogati | Unplaced | | |

=== Former Franchise ===
- : Declared as Winner
- : Ended as runner-up or top 5/6 qualification
- : Ended as one of the finalists or semifinalists
- : Ended as special awards winner

==== Miss Universe Nepal ====
THT Miss Nepal held the Miss Universe franchise from 2017 to 2019, later transferred to Umanga Creations (2020-2023) and Global Glamour Venture (2024-present).

| Year | District | Miss Universe Nepal | Placement at Miss Universe | Special Awards | Notes |
|---|---|---|---|---|---|
| 2019 | Kathmandu | Pradeepta Adhikari | Unplaced | | |
| 2018 | Gorkha | Manita Devkota | Top 10 | | Devkota raised the highest money (310,000 Baht roughly $9,500) during a charity auction in Miss Universe 2018. |
| 2017 | Kathmandu | Nagma Shrestha | Unplaced | | Miss Earth 2012 (Top 8), World Miss University 2016 (3rd Runner-up), Miss Eco Universe 2016 (Best Tourism Video award) — Miss Nepal Earth 2012 |

==== Miss Supranational Nepal ====
THT Miss Nepal sent delegates to Miss Supranational from 2018 to 2020. Since 2021, the franchise is under Miss and Mister National Nepal.

| Year | District | Miss Nepal Supranational | Placement at Miss Supranational | Special Awards | Notes |
|---|---|---|---|---|---|
| 2021 | Kathmandu | Shimal Kanaujiya | Unplaced | | |
| 2020 | Due to the impact of COVID-19 pandemic, no pageant in 2020 | | | | |
| 2019 | Kathmandu | Rose Lama | Unplaced | | |
| 2018 | Kathmandu | Mahima Singh | Unplaced | | Chosen from the Top 7 and was appointed as Miss Nepal Supranational 2018 by the Miss Nepal organization and Top 8 in Face of House of Fashion Season 1 |
| 2016 | Kathmandu | Pooja Shrestha | Unplaced | | |

==== Miss Earth Nepal ====
THT Miss Nepal held Miss Earth franchise from 2002 to 2025. Currently Global Glamour Venture holds the Miss Earth Nepal license.

| Year | District | Miss Nepal | Placement at Miss Earth | Special Awards | Notes |
|---|---|---|---|---|---|
| 2025 | Rasuwa | Sony Ghale | Unplaced | (gold) Talent (Fire group); (silver) Miss People's Choice | |
| 2024 | Chitwan | Sumana Khatri Chhetri | Unplaced | (silver) Upcycling Fashion Show | |
| 2023 | Dang | Raina Majgaiya | Unplaced | | |
| 2022 | Lalitpur | Sareesha Shrestha | Unplaced | Best Eco Video (Asia & Oceania) | |
| 2021 | Kathmandu | Supriya Shrestha | Unplaced | | |
| 2020 | Did not compete | | | | |
| 2019 | Kathmandu | Riya Basnet | Unplaced | | |
| 2018 | Kathmandu | Priya Sigdel | Top 18 | (silver) Talent (Fire group); DV Boer Ambassadress; Best Eco-Video Award | |
| 2017 | Kathmandu | Rojina Shrestha | Unplaced | | |
| 2016 | Lalitpur | Roshni Khatri | Unplaced | (silver) Resort Wear | |
| 2015 | Kathmandu | Dibyata Vaidya | Unplaced | | |
| 2014 | Kathmandu | Prinsha Shrestha | Unplaced | (gold) Yahoo! Beauty for a Cause; Eco-Beauty Video (Top 10) | Dethroned |
| 2013 | Lalitpur | Rojisha Shahi | Unplaced | (silver) Best in Evening Gown; (silver) Most Child Friendly Challenge | |
| 2012 | Kathmandu | Nagma Shrestha | Top 8 | (silver) Walk with M.E; (silver) Dolphins Love Freedom Mural Painting Challenge | |
| 2011 | Chitwan | Anupama Aura Gurung | Unplaced | | |
| 2010 | Surkhet | Sahana Bajracharya | Unplaced | | |
| 2009 | Kathmandu | Richa Thapa Magar | Unplaced | | |
| 2008 | Did not compete | | | | |
| 2007 | Lalitpur | Bandana Sharma | Unplaced | | |
| 2006 | Kathmandu | Ayushma Pokharel | Unplaced | | |
| 2005 | Kathmandu | Shavona Shrestha | Unplaced | Miss People's Choice (Top 5) | |
| 2004 | Kaski | Anita Gurung | Unplaced | | |
| 2003 | Did not compete | | | | |
| 2002 | Kathmandu | Nira Gautam | Unplaced | | |

==== Miss Asia Pacific Nepal ====
From 1994 to 1997, the Miss Nepal pageant was held to select the representative of the Nepal to the Miss Asia Pacific Pageant. In 1997, Jharana Bajracharya was crowned as Hidden Treasures Miss World Nepal 1997 winner who was sent to Miss World 1997 and Kathmandu Jaycees Miss Nepal where Nilima Gurung took the crown and went to Miss Asia Pacific 1997. After 1997, Miss Nepal Beauty Pageant started to hold the local franchise for the Miss World Pageant and the 1st runner-up was sent to the Miss Asia Pacific contest until 2005. The Hidden Treasure reacquired the franchise for 2016-2017. Since 2018, GEE Nepal Pvt. Ltd. is responsible for selecting 'Miss Asia Pacific Nepal'.

| Year | District | Miss Nepal Asia Pacific | Placement at Miss Asia Pacific International | Special Awards | Notes |
|---|---|---|---|---|---|
| 2025 | Pokhara | Prapti Ranabhat | Top 10 | | |
| 2024 | Kathmandu | Akankshya Nakarmi | Did not compete | | GEE Nepal Directorship (2018-present) |
| No pageant held, 2020-2023 | | | | | GEE Nepal Directorship (2018-present) |
| 2019 | Bhaktapur | Pratistha Saakha | Unplaced | | GEE Nepal Directorship (2018-present) |
| 2018 | Bhaktapur | Aastha Saakha | Unplaced | | GEE Nepal Directorship (2018-present) |
| 2017 | Lalitpur | Sahara Basnet | Unplaced | | The Hidden Treasure Directorship (1997-2005, 2016-2017) |
| 2016 | Lalitpur | Anushu KC | Unplaced | | The Hidden Treasure Directorship (1997-2005, 2016-2017) |
No pageant between 2006—2015
| 2005 | Lalitpur | Sarah Gurung | Unplaced | | |
| 2004 | No pageant | | | | |
| 2003 | Kathmandu | Prerana Shah | Top 10 | | In 2003, First ever international placement for Miss Nepal in over 9 years of the pageant |
Did not compete between 2001—2002
| 2000 | Kathmandu | Biva Maya Ranjeet | Unplaced | | |
| 1999 | Kathmandu | Nikita Bhandari Kshatriya | Unplaced | | |
| 1998 | Kathmandu | Niru Shrestha Gurung | Unplaced | | In 1998, Previously Jyoti Pradhan was crowned as Miss Nepal 1998 but later on Jyoti got dethroned for being unable to fulfil her duties as Miss Nepal. Later, 1st runner-up Niru Shrestha was crowned as Miss Nepal 1998 |
| 1997 | Pokhara | Nilima Gurung | Unplaced | | Kathmandu Jaycees & Hidden Treasure Collaboration (1994-1997) |
| 1996 | Kathmandu | Poonam Ghimire | Unplaced | | Kathmandu Jaycees & Hidden Treasure Collaboration (1994-1997) |
| 1995 | Kathmandu | Sumi Khadka | Unplaced | | Kathmandu Jaycees & Hidden Treasure Collaboration (1994-1997) |
| 1994 | Birgunj | Ruby Rana | Unplaced | | Kathmandu Jaycees & Hidden Treasure Collaboration (1994-1997) |

== Preliminary Pageants ==
=== Miss Nepal North America ===
The first ever Miss Nepal USA was held, in August 2011 and was organized by Event Planet Inc. Since 2014, there has been introduction to new special awards of Miss California Nepal, Miss New York Nepal and Miss Texas Nepal as the winners of regional states which were equivalent to 3rd runner-up spots. Since 2019, the Miss Nepal US Organisation stopped giving the special regional awards.

| Year | Miss Nepal USA | 1st Runner-Up | 2nd Runner-Up | Miss California Nepal | Miss New York Nepal | Miss Texas Nepal |
|---|---|---|---|---|---|---|
| 2026 | Deepika Sharma; Pokhara | Anamika Shrestha; Kathmandu | Anamica Khadgi; Kathmandu | | | |
| 2025 | Diya Shrestha; New Jersey | Krishma Subedi; Texas | Ariya Koirala; Texas | | | |
| 2024 | Anna Koirala; North Carolina | Ruby Poudel; Maryland | Adishree Regmi; Texas | | | |
| 2023 | Jubliee Sherpa; New York | Razila Bastola; New York | Esha Subedi; Ontario | | | |
| 2022 | Pratiyusha Bohora; Texas | Aanya Thapa; Colorado | Divya Pant; Pennsylvania | | | |
| 2021 | Pratiksha Shukla; Colorado | Yangchhen Lama; New York | Subekshya Niroula; Texas | | | |
| 2019 | Sriya Gajurel; New York | Reema Sharma; Texas | Megha Rauniyar; Illinois | | | |
| 2018 | Dilasha Neupane; Nebraska | Pasha Gharti Thapa; Texas | Kriti Dhungel; Colorado | | | Bianca Adhikari; Texas |
| 2017 | | | | Rose Lama; California | | |
| 2016 | No pageant held | | | | | |
| 2015 | Priyanka Thapaliya, North Carolina | Kausali Lama Minnesota; California | Neha Jha; Texas | Sunita Pun; California | Neha Jha; New York | Sharon Gami; Texas |
| 2014 | Khushbu Mishra; Ohio | Sushma Sharma; California | Sushma Adhikari; Massachusetts | Kusma Kharel; California | Kabita Pahari; New York | Supriya Sharma; Texas |
| 2013 | Bartika Rai; New York | Anuja Thapa Magar; California | Sony Pathak; Texas | Anuja KC; California | Samjhana Lama; New York | Nikki Pandey; Texas |
| 2012 | Astha Shrestha; Maryland | Nurja Shrestha; Texas | Aashma Dhakal; New York | Sangita Dhakal; California | Aashma Dhakal; New York | Nurja Shrestha; Texas |
| 2011 | Sujita Basnet; District of Columbia | Tilasmi Bista; California | Nabina Basnet; Texas | Tilasmi Bista; California | Jubi Gauchan; New York | Sushma Bogati; Texas |

=== Miss Hong Kong Nepal ===
Miss Nepal Hong Kong was held in 1998 in favor of giving a platform for Nepalese teenagers to women in Hong Kong to build up their confidence and self-esteem. Factually, since Hong Kong's life is hectic and also because of internal issues, Miss Nepal Hong Kong has had ups and downs: 1998 (was held), 1999 (canceled), 2000 (was held), 2001 (was held), 2002, 2003, 2004 (canceled), 2005 (was held). Consequently, Miss Talent Hunt Hong Kong Nepal (Mega Model) was replaced by Miss Nepal Hong Kong from 2006 to 2009 organized by Laxmi Rai (Lara), Mamita Gurung (Miss Hong Kong Nepal 2000), and Tara Subbha. It followed up organizers from 2008 (Basanti Pun and Sushmita Gurung) because of some internal issues. However, in 2010 since Miss Talent Hunt HK Nepal was transformed into an international pageant, it withdrew itself from Miss Nepal Hong Kong. After a long decades, fortunately, in 2011, the 5th Miss Nepal Hong Kong was held on 3 August 2011.

| Year | Miss Nepal Hong Kong | 1st Runner-Up | 2nd Runner-Up |
|---|---|---|---|
| 2026 | Deepamala Dhakal; Hong Kong | | |
| 2023 | Anjana Pun; Pokhara, Nepal | Shima Gurung; Dharan, Nepal | Serena Rai; Kathmandu, Nepal |
| 2018 | Priya Gurung; Lamjung, Nepal | Neha Rai; Dharan, Nepal | Javina Shrestha; Kathmandu, Nepal |
| 2017 | Sushma Limbu; Tsuen Wan, Hong Kong | Prajila Garbuja; Jordan, Hong Kong | Elisha Gurung; Jordan, Hong Kong |
| 2016 | Bhumika Gurung; Tsuen Wan, Hong Kong | Neha Rai; Yuen Long, Hong Kong | Sunita Limbu; Tsuen Wan, Hong Kong |
| 2012 | Parina Subba; Kowloon City, Hong Kong | Manisha Rai | Parmila Thapa |
| 2011 | Lakpa Dolma Sherpa; Yuen Long, Hong Kong | Mamta Gurung | Ruthsha Rai |
| 2005 | Purnima Gurung; Kowloon City, Hong Kong | Deepa BK | Sunita Thapa |
| 2001 | Pooja Subba; Kwun Tong, Hong Kong | | |
| 2000 | Mamita Gurung; Wan Chai, Hong Kong | Kavita Gurung | Saiyan Amatya |
| 1998 | Junu Pun; Kwai Tsing, Hong Kong | | |

=== Miss Oceania Nepal ===
| Year | Miss Nepal Oceania | 1st Runner-Up | 2nd Runner-Up |
|---|---|---|---|
| 2020 | Jemina Shrestha; New South Wales, Australia | Anshika Sharma; New South Wales, Australia | Reshmi Gurung; New South Wales, Australia |
| 2018 | Anushka Shrestha; New South Wales, Australia | | |
| 2016 | Rusha Rakhi Baral; New South Wales, Australia | Roshana Pokharel; Queensland, Australia | Richa Thapa; Auckland, New Zealand |
| 2014 | Arjoo Karki; Sydney | Junita Lama; Sydney | Sudibty Shrestha; Sydney |
| 2012 | Deepashree Shah; Melbourne, Australia | Archana Karki; Sydney | Shitwant Basnet; Brisbane, Australia |
| 2011 | Reecha Dhital; Sydney, Australia | Munmoon Shah; Sydney, Australia | Nira Pun; Sydney, Australia |
| 2009 | Sanam Dangol; Sydney, Australia | Karishma Shrestha; Perth, Australia | Prada Pradhan; Brisbane, Australia |

=== Miss UK Nepal ===
| Year | Miss UK Nepal | 1st Runner-Up | 2nd Runner-Up | 3rd Runner-Up |
|---|---|---|---|---|
| 2017 | Sirjana Gurung; Northolt, UK; Pokhara, Nepal | Sujana Pun; Wembley, UK; Kathmandu, Nepal | Lisha Sunar; Andover, UK; Yuen Long, Hong Kong | Alin Garbuja; Wembley, UK; Kathmandu, Nepal |
| 2016 | Tenisa Rana; London, UK; Pokhara, Nepal | Prashangsa Limbu; Kent, UK; Dharan, Nepal | Biviya Shrestha; London, UK; Kathmandu, Nepal | Alisha Gauchan; Reading, UK; Pokhara, Nepal |
| 2014 | Nia Dewan; Ashford, UK; Dharan, Nepal | Sumi Shrestha; Eastbourne, UK; Kathmandu, Nepal | Aarya Sharma; Wolverhampton, UK; Chitwan, Nepal | Jenny Gurung; Wembley, UK; Kathmandu, Nepal |
| 2012 | Durga Gurung; Feltham, UK; Pokhara, Nepal | Parika Ale; London, UK; Kathmandu, Nepal | Nayan Gurung; Farnborough, UK; Pokhara, Nepal | Ashika Rai; Woking, UK; Dharan, Nepal |
| 2011 | Gaumaya Gurung; Watford, UK; Gorkha, Nepal | Pragya Shrestha; North London, UK; Lalitpur, Nepal | Neelam Gurung; Reading, UK; Pokhara, Nepal | Brishana Gurung; Watford, UK; Gorkha, Nepal |
| 2010 | Nabina Gurung; Hounslow, UK; Kathmandu, Nepal | Sheila Shraddha Limbu; Hampshire, UK; Pokhara, Nepal | Monica Limbu; Hampshire, UK; Pokhara, Nepal | Bhawana Limbu; Guilford, UK; Dharan, Nepal |

=== Performance of Associated Pageant Winners in Miss Nepal ===
The following is a list of overseas contestants who have competed at the Miss Nepal Pageant. Overseas competed from 2005 onwards, every year except 2007.

| Year | Delegate name | Region represented | Placement (if any) | Special awards won | Notes |
|---|---|---|---|---|---|
| 2005 | Cherie Sophie Sherchan | New York, USA | Top 10 Semi-finalist | | |
| 2009 | Reetu Shakya | New York, USA | Top 5 Finalist | | |
| 2010 | Binita Thapa | California, USA | | | |
| 2011 | Anupama Aura Gurung | Singapore, Singapore | Miss Nepal Earth | Miss Best Hair | Previously competed in Miss Mongol 2010 and ended with Miss Personality sub-title. |
| 2012 | Shristi Shrestha | Cornwall, UK | Miss Nepal World | Miss Confident | |
| 2013 | Ishani Shrestha | Colorado, USA | Miss Nepal World | Miss Best Walk | |
| 2013 | Sumi Lama | Texas, USA | Top 5 Finalist | | Previously competed in Miss Tamang 2012 and won the crown. |
| 2014 | Pranayna KC | Perth, Australia | Top 5 Finalist | Miss Personality | Previously competed in Miss Nepal 2008 but the pageant later on got cancelled due to the Feminists Movement. |
| 2015 | Evana Manandhar | Pennsylvania, USA | Miss Nepal World | Miss Intellectual; Miss Personality; Miss Gosh Girl | |
| 2015 | Durga Gurung | London, UK | Top 10 Semi-finalist | | Previous winner of Miss UK Nepal 2012. |
| 2015 | Nuning Limbu | London, UK | Top 10 Semi-finalist | Miss Popular | |
| 2018 | Manita Devkota | Minnesota, USA | Miss Nepal Universe | Miss Glamour | First Miss Universe Nepal winner crowned alongside 3 other winners in Miss Nepal stage. |
| 2018 | Megha Shrestha | Osaka, Japan | Top 15 Semi-finalist | Miss Athletic | |
| 2018 | Jyotsna Chettri | Sydney, Australia | Top 15 Semi-finalist | | |
| 2019 | Rose Lama | California, USA | Miss Nepal Supranational | Miss Glamour; Miss Photogenic | First Miss Supranational Nepal winner crowned alongside 4 other winners in Miss Nepal stage. Miss California Nepal 2017 |
| 2022 | Nancy Khadka | California, USA | Miss Nepal International | Miss Popular Choice; Miss Vibrant | Previously 4th runner-up of Miss Universe Nepal 2020 |
| 2022 | Rose Kandel | Texas, USA | Top 6 Finalist | Dabur Miss Best Hair | |
| 2022 | Sriya Gajurel | New York, USA | Top 12 Semi-finalist | | Previous winner of Miss Nepal North America 2019. |
| 2024 | Karuna Rawat | Sydney, Australia | Miss Nepal International | | Previously Miss SEE Pokhara Runner Up |
| 2024 | Anjana Pun | HK, Hong Kong | Top 13 Semi-finalist | Miss Popular Choice; Miss DHI | Previous winner of Miss Nepal Hong Kong 2023 |
| 2026 | Deepmala Dhakal | HK, Hong Kong | TBA | TBA | Previous winner of Miss Nepal Hong Kong International 2026 |

== See also ==
- Miss Vibhaa
- Miss Grand Nepal
- List of Miss Nepal titleholders
- Miss Teen Nepal
- Miss Universe Nepal
- Miss and Mister National Nepal
