= Miss Nepal 2023 =

Beauty pageant in Nepal

- Date: 27 May 2023
- Presenters: Sahana Bajracharya; Priyanka Rani Joshi; Sareesha Shrestha; Nancy Khadka
- Venue: Godavari Sunrise Convention Center, Lalitpur, Nepal
- Broadcaster: Kantipur Television
- Entrants: 24
- Placements: 11
- Winner: Srichchha Pradhan; Miss Nepal World Raina Majgaiya; Miss Nepal Earth Prasiddhy Shah; Miss Nepal International

The Hidden Treasures Dabur Vatika Shampoo Miss Nepal 2023, was the 27th Miss Nepal pageant held on 27 May 2023 at the Godavari Sunrise Convention Center, at Godawari, Lalitpur. Nepalese delegates for Miss World 2025, Miss Earth 2023, Miss International 2023 were crowned at the end of event.

The grand coronation event was shown live exclusively on Kantipur Television HD, Kantipur Cineplex HD and Official YouTube Channel.

== Regional Auditions ==
To ensure that the pageant is inclusive and representative of all regions, the audition will cover all seven Provinces of Nepal. Regional auditions will be held in Province No. 1, Madhesh Province, Bagmati Province, Gandaki Province, Lumbini Province, Karnali Province, and Sudurpashchim Province. The final audition in Kathmandu will be held on 18 March at the Park Village Hotel in Budhanilkantha, Nepal. The selected Top 24 finalists will compete at the grand coronation event of Miss Nepal 2023 on 27 May 2023.

List of the Main Events in the Miss Nepal 2023 Beauty Pageant
Province	Date	Event	Venue	Number of Delegates	Ref.
Province No. 1	11 February 2023	Miss Itahari 2023	Shanti Party Palace, Itahari	TBA	
Madhesh Province	17 February 2023	Miss Birgunj 2023	Hotel Vishuwa, Birgunj	TBA	
Gandaki Province	22 February 2023	Miss Pokhara 2023	Waterfront Resort, Phewa Lake	TBA	
Sudurpashchim Province	4 March 2023	Miss Dhangadhi 2023	Rubus Hotel, Dhangadhi	TBA	
Lumbini Province	11 March 2023	Miss Nepalgunj 2023	Hotel Siddhartha, Nepalgunj	TBA	
Karnali Province	13 March 2023	Miss Surkhet 2023	Hotel Siddharta Surkhet	TBA	
Bagmati Province	18 March 2023	Miss Kathmandu 2023	Park Village Hotel, Budhanilkantha	TBA	
Bagmati Province	27 May 2023	Miss Nepal 2023	Godavari Sunrise Convention Center, Lalitpur	TBA	

== Results ==
=== Placements ===
Color keys

- The contestant Won in an International pageant.
- The contestant was a Runner-up in an International pageant.
- The contestant was a Semi-Finalist in an International pageant.
- The contestant assumed another title.
- The contestant was not able to compete in an International pageant.
- The contestant did not place but won a Special Award in the pageant.
- The contestant did not place.

Placement	Contestant	International placement
Miss Nepal World 2023	Kathmandu - Srichchha Pradhan	Unplaced– Miss World 2025
Miss Nepal Earth 2023	Dang – Raina Majgaiya	Unplaced – Miss Earth 2023
Miss Nepal International 2023	Lalitpur – Prasiddhy Shah (●)	Unplaced – Miss International 2023
Top 5	Kathmandu – Aishworya Shrestha; Dhading – Grishma Adhikari	
Top 11	Hetauda – Kriti Bartaula; Kathmandu – Kritika Basnet; Kathmandu – Swinja Sunam; Lalitpur – Holiska Koirala; Nuwakot – Rajani Mishra; Sarlahi – Smarika Karki	

(●): The candidate is the winner of Miss Popular Choice (online voting) and got direct entry into Top 11 semi-Finalists.

=== Special awards ===
Special Awards	Winner
Yeti Airlines Women with the Wing	(Nepal) Pokhara - Unnati Gurung
Cetaphil Miss Healthy Skin	(Nepal) Dang - Raina Majgaiya
The Hidden Treasure Miss Beauty with a Purpose	(Nepal) Janakpur - Aayushma Baral
Real Miss Popular Choice	(Nepal) Lalitpur - Prasiddhy Shah
The Kathmandu Post Miss Intellectual	Kathmandu - Aishworya Shrestha
Miss DHI	Kathmandu - Srichchha Pradhan
Brij Cement Miss Confident	Kathmandu - Pragya Bajracharya
Berger Miss Glamor	(Nepal) Dhading - Grishma Adhikari
Creative D Miss Photogenic	Kathmandu - Pritika Khadka
Farmasi Face of the Year	Kathmandu - Srichchha Pradhan
Dabur Honey Miss Fitness Queen	Kathmandu - Aishworya Shrestha
J Music Miss Multimedia	(Nepal) Jhapa - Suhani Chhetri

=== Contestants ===
Contestants	Age	Height	Home Town	Education
Raina Majgaiya	26	1.68 m (5 ft 6 in)	Dang, Lumbini Province	Commercial Pilot
Samarika Karki	22	1.60 m (5 ft 3 in)	Sarlahi, Madhesh Province	Student of Media Mass Communication
Pragya Bajracharya		1.60 m (5 ft 3 in)	Kathmandu, Bagmati Province	Computer Science/ Information Technology
Kabina Shrestha		1.60 m (5 ft 3 in)	Nuwakot, Bagmati Province	Graduate - Fashion Technology
Aayusha Maharjan		1.60 m (5 ft 3 in)	Kirtipur, Bagmati Province	MBA – Global Leadership/ Management
Kriti Bartaula		1.65 m (5 ft 5 in)	Hetauda, Bagmati Province	Bachelor's – Dental Surgery
Sudha Devkota		1.68 m (5 ft 6 in)	Chitwan, Bagmati Province	Bachelor's in Journalism/ Mass Communication
Prasiddhy Shah	25	1.63 m (5 ft 4 in)	Lalitpur, Bagmati Province	Bachelor's – Environmental Science
Srishti Hada	24	1.64 m (5 ft 4 1/2 in)	Bhaktapur, Bagmati Province	Bachelor's – Civil Engineering
Sadikchya Thapa		1.68 m (5 ft 6 in)	Lalitpur, Bagmati Province	Bachelor's – Nursing Science (Psychiatric)
Barsha Gautam		1.63 m (5 ft 4 in)	Bhaktapur, Bagmati Province	Bachelor's – Environmental Science
Unnati Gurung	25	1.63 m (5 ft 4 in)	Pokhara, Gandaki Province	MBA – Global Leadership/ Management
Aayushma Baral		1.60 m (5 ft 3 in)	Janakpur, Madhesh Province	Bachelor's – Sociology/ English Literature
Rajani Mishra		1.62 m (5 ft 4 in)	Nuwakot, Bagmati Province	Business Graduate and Pursuing CA
Holiska Koirala		1.73 m (5 ft 8 in)	Lalitpur, Bagmati Province	Bachelor's – International Business
Swinja Sunam		1.62 m (5 ft 4 in)	Kathmandu, Bagmati Province	Bachelor's – Social work/ Psychology
Srichchha Pradhan	23	1.60 m (5 ft 3 in)	Kathmandu, Bagmati Province	Bachelor's – Liberal Arts/ Science
Grishma Adhikari		1.61 m (5 ft 3 1/2 in)	Dhading, Bagmati Province	Bachelor's – Dental Surgery
Apeksha Khatiwada		1.64 m (5 ft 4 1/2 in)	Bhaktapur, Bagmati Province	Bachelor's – Business Administration
Kritika Basnet		1.62 m (5 ft 4 in)	Kathmandu, Bagmati Province	Bachelor's Computer Science
Aishworya Shrestha	25	1.65 m (5 ft 5 in)	Kathmandu, Bagmati Province	Master's – Social Work
Tshering Dolma Pakhrin		1.62 m (5 ft 4 in)	Lalitpur, Bagmati Province	Bachelor's Student
Suhani Chhetri		1.70 m (5 ft 7 in)	Jhapa, Koshi Province	Bachelor's – Sociology/ Psychology
Pritika Khadka		1.63 m (5 ft 4 in)	Kathmandu, Bagmati Province	Undergraduate Fashion Designer
