= Miss Nepal 2025 =

Beauty pageant in Nepal

- Date: 30 August 2025
- Presenters: Sanjay Silwal Gupta; Roneeshma Shrestha
- Venue: Godavari Sunrise Convention Center, Lalitpur, Nepal
- Broadcaster: Himalaya TV
- Entrants: 26
- Placements: 13
- Winner: Luna Luitel; Miss Nepal World Deepshikha Nepal; Miss Nepal Cosmo Urusha Bhandari; Miss Nepal International Sony Ghale; Miss Nepal Earth

The Hidden Treasure Miss Nepal 2025, was the 29th Miss Nepal pageant held on 30 August 2025 at the Godavari Sunrise Convention Center, at Godawari, Lalitpur. Nepalese delegates for Miss World 2026, Miss Cosmo 2025, Miss International 2025 and Miss Earth 2025 were crowned at the end of the event.

The grand coronation event was shown live exclusively on Official YouTube Channel of The Hidden Treausre and Himalaya TV.

== Regional auditions ==
To ensure that the pageant is inclusive and representative of all regions, the audition was held in 3 Provinces of Nepal. Regional auditions was held in Province No. 1, Madhesh Province, Madhesh Province, and Lumbini Province. The final audition in Kathmandu was held on 12 July 2025 at The Plaza, Pulchowk in Kathmandu, Nepal. The selected Top 24 finalists will compete at the grand coronation event of Miss Nepal 2025 on 30 August 2025.

List of the main events in the Miss Nepal 2025 beauty pageant
Province	Date	Event	Venue	Number of Delegates	Ref.
Koshi	30 June 2025	Miss Jhapa	Birtamod, Jhapa	0	
Madhesh	8 July 2025	Miss Janakpur	Hotel Aripan, Janakpur	1	
Lumbini	16 July 2025	Miss Nepalgunj	Hotel Siddhartha, Nepalgunj	1	
Bagmati	12 July 2025	Miss Kathmandu	The Plaza, Pulchowk Lalitpur	16	

Affiliated Pageant Partners
Pageant	Contestants
Model of the Year 2025	Ramechhap – Smriti Shrestha

== Results ==
=== Placements ===
Placement	Contestant	International placement
Miss Nepal World 2025	Luna Luitel - Kathmandu	Unplaced – Miss World 2026
Miss Nepal Cosmo 2025	Deepshikha Nepal - Jhapa	Unplaced – Miss Cosmo 2025
Miss Nepal International 2025	Urusha Bhandari - Achham	Unplaced – Miss International 2025
Miss Nepal Earth 2025	Sony Ghale - Rasuwa	Unplaced – Miss Earth 2025
Top 12	Arshiya Thapa - Kathmandu; Jagadishwari Shah - Nepalgunj; Nilima Pandey - Birtamod; Priyanka Thapa - Lalitpur; Ojal Rayamajhi - Kathmandu; Sanvi Mandal - Janakpur; Smriti Shrestha - Ramechhap; Shreeyani Shrestha - Kathmandu	

=== Special awards ===
Special Awards	Winner
Miss Popular Choice	Urusha Bhandari
Miss Timeless Elegance	Urusha Bhandari
Yeti Airlines Women with Wings	Nilima Pandey
Brij Cement Miss Confident	Pragika Kshetree
Cetaphil Miss Healthy Skin	Aarati Thapa
Creative D Miss Photogenic	Smriti Shrestha
Farmasi Face of the Year	Smriti Shrestha
The Hidden Treasure Miss Beauty with a Purpose	Shristi Kumari Tamang
Miss Pristine	Priyanka Thapa
Miss DHI	Luna Luitel
Berger Miss Silk	Luna Luitel
BYD Miss Green Visionary	Jagadishwori Shah
Miss Empowered Choices	Deepshikha Nepal
The Kathmandu Post Miss Intellectual	Shruti Maharjan
Miss Beautiful Hair	Saichchha Thapa

== Contestants ==
26 contestants will compete for the title.

No	Representing	Contestant	Age (Note: Ages at the time of the pageant)	Height	Education
1	Janakpur	Sanvi Mandal	22	5 ft 4 in (1.63 m)	Bachelors of Business Administration
2	Rupandehi	Sanskriti Bhattarai	25	5 ft 9 in (1.75 m)	MBBS
3	Panauti	Sudina Humagain	22	5 ft 6 in (1.68 m)	Bachelors in Dental Surgery
4	Lalitpur	Shruti Maharjan	23	5 ft 5 in (1.65 m)	Media Studies
5	Nuwakot	Anuradha Sharma Dhakal	25	5 ft 4 in (1.63 m)	Bachelors of Pharmacy
6	Janakpur	Anupriya Thakur	22	5 ft 5 in (1.65 m)	Bachelors of Business Administration
7	Jhapa	Deepshikha Nepal	24	5 ft 4 in (1.63 m)	Bachelors of Environmental Science
8	Nepalgunj	Jagadishwari Shah	25	5 ft 5 in (1.65 m)	Masters in Business Administration
9	Kathmandu	Luna Luitel	26	5 ft 3 in (1.60 m)	Bachelors of Science in Nursing
10	Dolakha	Jasoda Karki	TBA	5 ft 5.5 in (1.66 m)	Masters in Political Science
11	Kathmandu	Arshiya Thapa	22	5 ft 5.5 in (1.66 m)	MBBS
12	Achham	Urusha Bhandari	26	5 ft 8 in (1.73 m)	Bachelors in Dental Surgery
13	Kathmandu	Anjeela Rajak	TBA	5 ft 6 in (1.68 m)	Master’s in Sociology
14	Kathmandu	Shristi Kumari Tamang	22	5 ft 7 in (1.70 m)	Social work and Psychology
15	Kathmandu	Kristina Basnet	21	5 ft 6 in (1.68 m)	Psychology
16	Dolakha	Aarati Khadka	23	5 ft 4 in (1.63 m)	Bachelor’s in Computer Application
17	Salyan	Samridhi KC	25	5 ft 5 in (1.65 m)	Social work and Psychology
18	Biratnagar	Saichchha Thapa	26	5 ft 6 in (1.68 m)	Bachelors of Business Administration
19	Janakpur	Swati Panjiyar	25	5 ft 7 in (1.70 m)	Bachelor’s in Psychology
20	Rasuwa	Sony Ghale	25	5 ft 6 in (1.68 m)	Information Technology (IT)
21	Kathmandu	Shreeyani Shrestha	21	5 ft 3 in (1.60 m)	Bachelors of Business Administration
22	Ramechhap	Smriti Shrestha	23	5 ft 6 in (1.68 m)	Bachelors of Business Administration
23	Kathmandu	Ojal Rayamajhi	23	5 ft 7.5 in (1.71 m)	
24	Birtamod	Nilima Pandey	21	5 ft 4 in (1.63 m)	Bachelors of Business Administration
25	Lalitpur	Priyanka Thapa	25	5 ft 7.5 in (1.71 m)	Bachelor of Accountancy
26	Kathmandu	Pragika Kshetree	26	5 ft 5 in (1.65 m)	MMBS

== Previous pageants ==
- Deepshikha Nepal had competed at Miss Province 1 2018.
- Luna Luitel was Miss Teen 2015 1st Runner Up.
- Samridhi KC had entered the Top 22 of Miss Universe Nepal 2024 where she won "Miss Free and Fearless" subtitle.
- Smriti Shrestha was Miss Cosmopolitan-World Nepal 2023 and she placed as third runner-up of Miss Cosmopolitan World 2023.
