= Miss Chitwan =

Miss Chitwan is a beauty pageant which began in 1994 for the girls of Central Development Region. Miss Chitwan has been organized by Bright Nepal since the start and has been paving the way to the field of professional modelling and direct entry to the national beauty pageants like Miss Nepal.

== History ==
The pageant has been run by Bright Nepal. Anupa Giri was crowned as the first Miss Chitwan 1994, and ended up as third runner-up in the Miss Chitwanl 1994 beauty pageant.

Only Shristi Shrestha has clinched the Miss Nepal crown in 2012, so far being the only Miss Chitwan to win the crown of Miss Nepal. Miss Chitwan has the third highest number of placements after Miss Kathmandu and Miss Pokhara in Miss Nepal pageant and is ranked third-highest among regional contests in terms of placements.

== Miss Chitwan 2070 ==
After 12 years, the 3rd edition of Miss Chitwan 2070 was held on October 28, 2013, at the City hall. A total of 28 contestants were vying for the crown of Miss Chitwan 2071, Sitoshna Ban from Tandi won the title with Pooja Shrestha and Rakshya Thapa won the 1st and 2nd runners-up respectively.

== Results summary ==
- Miss Nepal: Shristi Shrestha (2012)
- 1st Runner-up: Anupama Aura Gurung (2011)
- 2nd Runners-up: Sarina Maskey (2011), Chandani Shrestha (1997)
- 3rd Runner-up: Bindu KC (1994)
- Top 10: Sitoshna Ban (2014)

== Awards ==
- Miss Personality: Chandani Shrestha (1997)
- Miss Photogenic: Sitoshna Ban (2014)
- Miss Confidence: Shristi Shrestha (2012)
- Miss Best Hair: Anupama Aura Gurung (2011)

== Performance in Miss Nepal ==
From 1998 till 2013 there was no Miss Chitwan beauty pageant; however, one or two delegates were sent to Miss Nepal contest as the representative of Chitwan District.

Year	Miss Chitwan	Placement at Miss Nepal	Special Awards	International
2017	Suman Gurung	TBA	TBA	
2016	Asmi Shrestha	Miss Nepal 2016	Miss Photogenic; Best in Evening Gown; Miss Personality	Competed in Miss World 2016 as Miss Nepal
2015	Sudipa Pathak	Top 10	Miss Scholar	
2014	Sitoshna Ban	Top 10	Miss Photogenic	
2012	Shristi Shrestha	Miss Nepal 2012	Miss Confidence	Competed in Miss World 2012 as Miss Nepal
2011	Anupama Aura Gurung	1st Runner Up (2011)	Miss Best Hair	Competed in Miss Earth 2011 as Miss Nepal
2011	Sarina Maskey	2nd Runner Up (2011)		Competed in Miss International 2011 as Miss Nepal
2002	Anupa Bhandari	Unplaced		
1997	Chandani Shrestha	2nd Runner Up (1997)	Miss Personality	
1994	Bindu KC	3rd Runner Up (1994)		
