= Luna Luitel =

Winner of Miss Nepal 2025

- Born: Kathmandu, Nepal
- Education: Western Sydney University (BS)
- Occupation: Nursing professional
- Beauty pageant titleholder
- Title: Miss Nepal World 2025
- Major competitions: Miss Nepal 2025; (Winner); Miss World 2026; (Unplaced)

Luna Luitel (Nepali: लुना लुइटेल) is a Nepalese beauty pageant titleholder who won Miss Nepal World 2025. She represented Nepal at Miss World 2026 in Vietnam.

== Education ==
Luitel attended the Occidental Public School in Anamnagar, Kathmandu. In grade four, she transferred to Pathshala Nepal Foundation in New Baneshwor, Kathmandu. After completing her School Leaving Certificate examinations, attended Global College for her higher secondary education. At the age of 17, she moved to Australia to study nursing and graduated from Western Sydney University in 2021. As of 2026, she is pursuing a postgraduate degree in Public Health at the University of Sydney.

== Pageantry ==
In 2015, Luitel was the first runner-up at Miss Teen Nepal. Luitel won Miss Nepal World 2025 on 30 August 2025, at the Godavari Sunrise Convention Centre, Lalitpur. She also won the title of Miss DHI. Luitel represented Nepal at Miss World 2026.

Awards and achievements
Preceded by Ashma Kumari KC; Nepal	Miss Nepal World; 2025	Succeeded by Deepmala Dhakal; Hong Kong
