= Sony Ghale =

Miss Nepal Earth 2025

Sony Ghale Gurung
- Born: Rasuwa, Nepal
- Education: Federation University Australia
- Height: 5 ft 6 in (168 cm)
- Beauty pageant titleholder
- Title: Miss Nepal Earth 2025
- Years active: 2020 - present
- Hair color: black
- Major competitions: Miss Nepal Earth 2025; (Winner); Miss Earth 2025; (Unplaced); (Best in Talent)

Sony Ghale is a Nepalese beauty pageant titleholder who won Miss Nepal Earth 2025. She represented Nepal at the Miss Earth 2025 pageant in the Philippines.

== Early life and education ==
Sony studied Information Technology at King's Own Institute and now works as an analyst at Hapag-Lloyd AG. Sony Ghale is an athlete and founder of Ek Shiksha, advocating for quality education in Nepal.

== Pageantry ==
=== Miss Nepal 2025 ===
Ghale won Miss Nepal Earth 2025 succeeding Sumana KC and received Rs 250,000 cash and a scooter.

=== Miss Earth 2025 ===
Sony will represented Nepal at Miss Earth 2025 in the Philippinwa on October, 2025. She was crowned Miss Nepal Earth. She also became first Miss Nepal from Rasuwa District. Sony was awarded as the winner of Miss Talent Competition where she performed "Scars to Your Beautiful" by Alessia Cara.

Awards and achievements
Preceded by Sumana KC	Miss Nepal Earth; 2025	Incumbent
