= Usha Khadgi =

Nepalese model and TV presenter

- उषा खड्गी
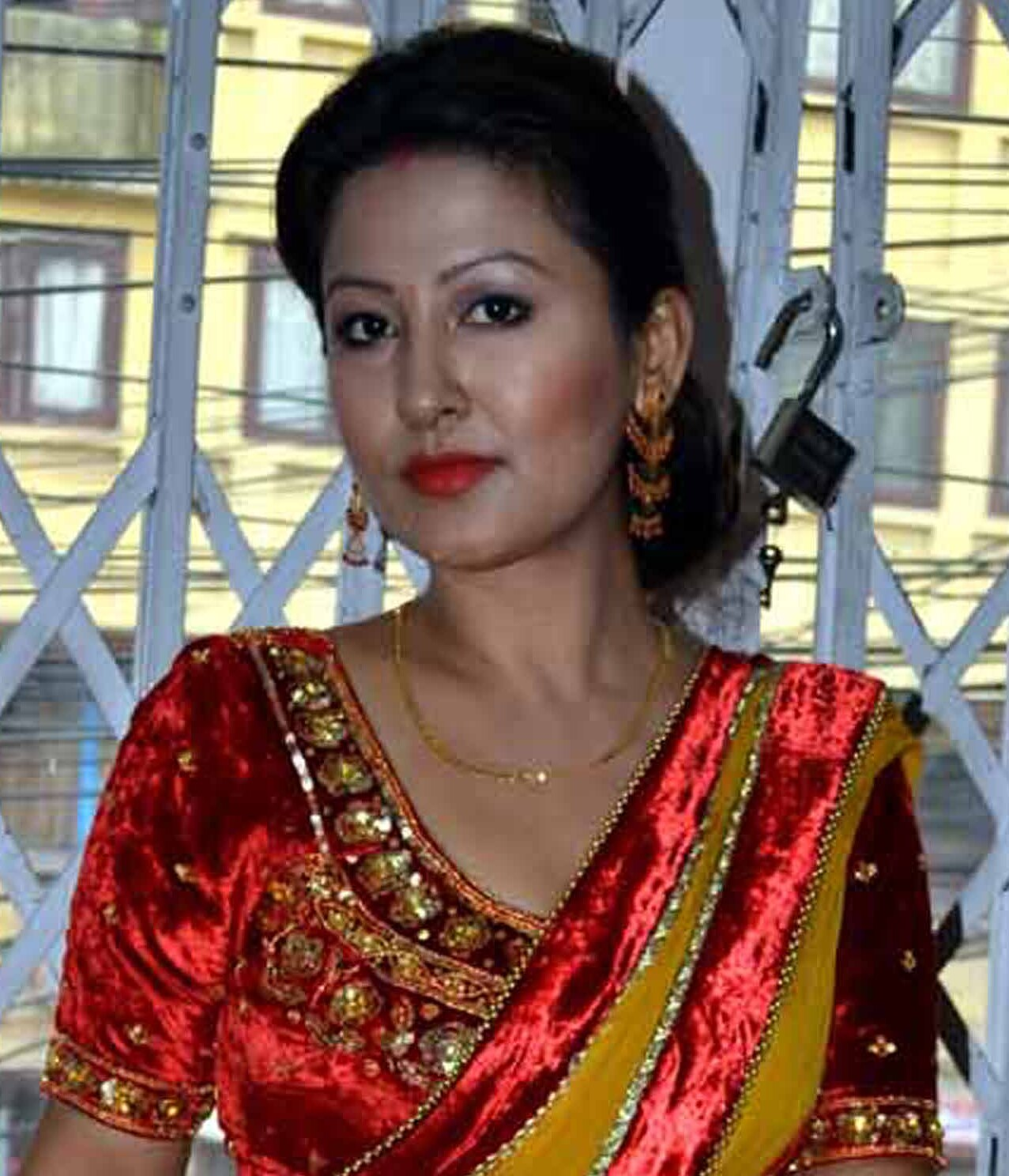
- Born: Birgunj, Nepal
- Occupations: Model, television presenter, businesswoman
- Beauty pageant titleholder
- Title: Miss Nepal World 2000
- Major competition: Miss Nepal World 2000 (Winner)
- Website: ushakhadgi.com.np

Usha Khadgi is a Nepalese model, television presenter, beauty pageant title holder and businesswoman. In 2000, she won the Miss Nepal pageant.

== Biography ==
Khadgi was born in Birgunj, Nepal to father Uttam Bahadur Khadgi and mother Urmila Khadgi.

She was the First Runner-up of Miss Pokhara 1999 and later she took part in Miss Birgunj in 2000 and won the title of the First Runner-up. In the same year, she took part in Miss Nepal 2000 and won the Miss Nepal title. She is the seventh Miss Nepal and the second winner from Birgunj, after Ruby Rana.

Since 2022, she started hosting the fourth season of a talk show titled Aama on News 24 channel. Each episode of the show features a Nepalese celebrity with their mother. The show has featured various actors, comedian and singers, such as Priyanka Karki, Jeetu Nepal, etc.

She also owns a business named, Usha's Stylish Collection, a fashion designer clothing and boutique.

== Filmography ==
=== Television ===
Year	Title	Channel	Season	Genre
2022	Aama	News 24	4	Talk show

== Personal life ==
She married GP Timalsena, a media person in 2003. They separated after 17 years of marriage in 2020. They have a daughter and a son.

== See also ==
- Ruby Rana

Awards and achievements
Preceded by Shweta Singh	Miss Nepal; 2000	Succeeded by Malvika Subba
