= Payal Shakya =

Nepalese-born Australian model

- पायल शाक्य
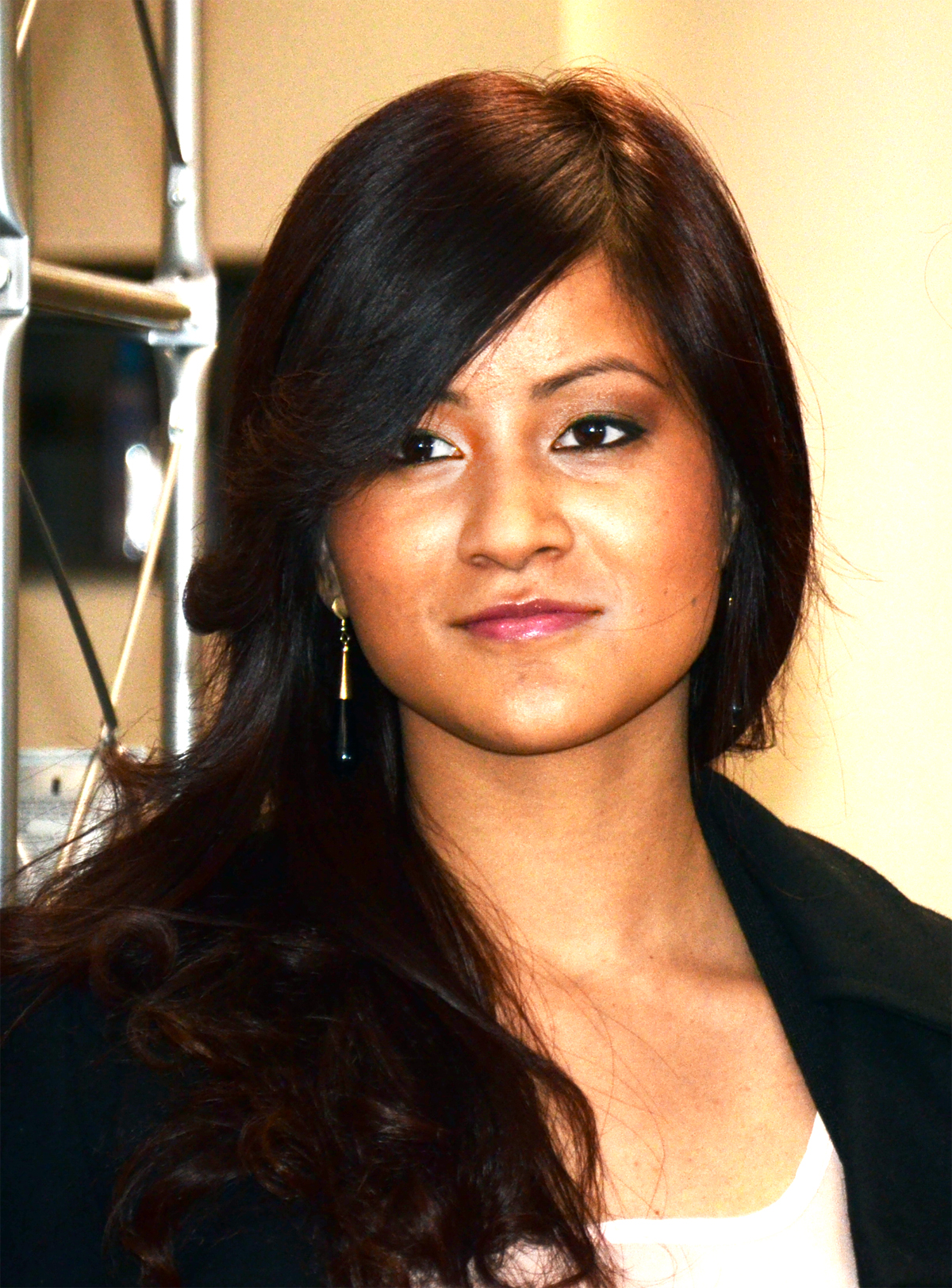
- At Moi Hair Salon Opening in Sydney.
- Born: 14 January 1986 (age 40); Kathmandu, Nepal
- Occupation: Model
- Known for: Miss Nepal 2004
- Height: 1.65 m (5 ft 5 in)
- Title: Miss Nepal World 2004
- Predecessor: Priti Sitoula
- Successor: Sugarika KC
- Spouse: Sarun Tamrakar (Since 2011)
- Children: Sahas Tamrakar

Payal Shakya is a Nepalese-born Australian model. She is the winner of the 2004 Miss Nepal pageant, which was held in Birendra International Convention Center, Kathmandu. She currently resides in Sydney, Australia, and works at Optus. While she was Miss Nepal, Payal worked to save the wetlands and rhinos. She was also an ambassador for Cancer Relief Society.

On 21 November 2011, Payal married Sarun Tamrakar, the lead singer of Nepali band The Uglyz, in Sydney.
