= Dolakha Town, Nepal =

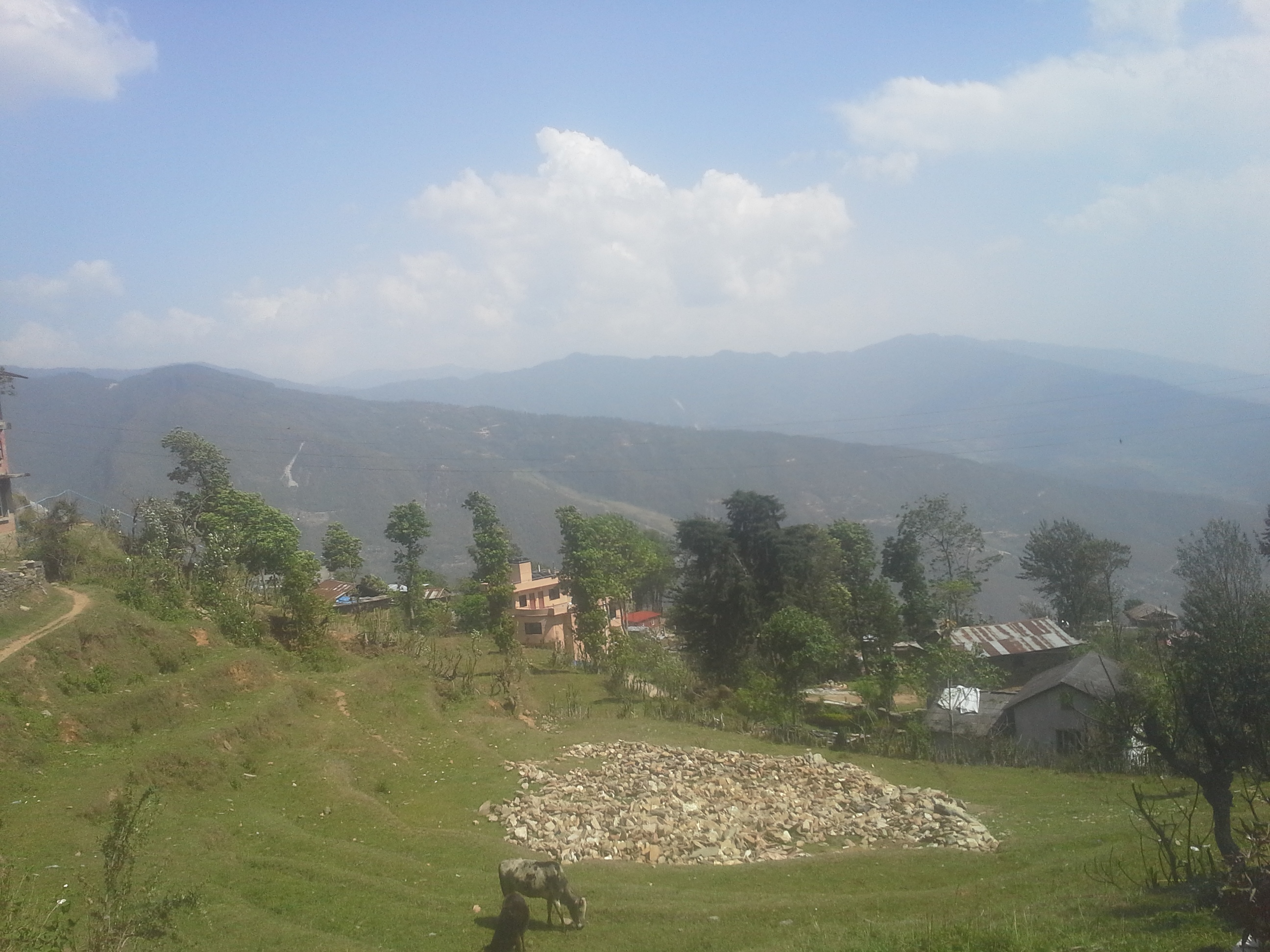
View of the Dolakha Town area and the Himalayas.

Dolakha Town is a village of Bhimeshwar Municipality of the Dolakha District, located in Bagmati Province in the lower Himalayas region of northern Nepal.

== Etymology ==
In its origin, the town of Dolakha was called "Abhayapur," which means "Abhay" — without fear; and "pur" — Nature cities. That is why Dolakha Town is also referred to as the "city without fear" because of the power of the god Bhim Sen.

== See also ==
- Dolakha District topics
- Rural municipalities of Nepal
