= Sumi Khadka =

Nepalese actress and beauty queen

- Born: Sumi Khadka; Kathmandu, Nepal
- Occupations: Model, actress, Flight Attendant, entrepreneur
- Spouse: Chiran Basnyat
- Children: Yug Bir Basnyat
- Modeling information
- Height: 1.63 m (5 ft 4 in)
- Hair color: Black
- Eye color: Brown

Sumi Khadka (Nepali: सुमी खड्का) (born c. 1978) is a Nepalese actress and beauty pageant titleholder. She was crowned Miss Nepal 1995.

== Filmography ==
Year	Film	Language
	Samarpan	Nepali
2001	Super Star	Nepali
--	Grahan	Nepali
--	Ek Najar	Nepali

Awards and achievements
Preceded by Ruby Rana	Miss Nepal 1995; 1995	Succeeded by Poonam Ghimire
