= Miss Kathmandu =

Nepalese regional beauty pageant

Miss Kathmandu is a beauty pageant that selects the representative for the Kathmandu Valley in the Miss Nepal pageant. The current titleholder is Prinsha Shrestha, who is the reigning Miss Nepal Earth 2014.

== History ==
Kathmandu Jaycess started the Miss Kathmandu pageant alongside Miss Nepal contest which was run by Girendra Man Rajbansi but after a year in 1995, he left the regional director position to Gopal Sundarlal Kakshapati who is also the chairman for Miss Nepal contest.

Kathmandu is the most successful city ever to compete at Miss Nepal. It has had ten winners, more than any other regional state. Kathmandu is best known for its three consecutive winners with a consistent top 5 placements. Before Kathmandu has won repetitively from 1998 to 1999 and recently from 2009 to 2010, no other regional city has ever won the Miss Nepal pageant more than twice in a row. Kathmandu also holds the most semi-finalists-5 and top 5 spots-5; and has received the most special awards.

== Former Miss Teen Nepal titleholders at Miss Kathmandu ==
Even though a lot of former Miss Teen Nepal titleholders have participated in Miss Kathmandu pageant, none has won the title so far. Although former Miss Teen Nepal finalists have manage to win Miss Kathmandu title; Zenisha Moktan (2009) who went on to win Miss Nepal 2009 and the same year Miss Kathmandu 2009 1st runner up Kunchhang Moktan Tamang ended as 2nd runner up.

Prior to former Miss Nepal Teen titleholders and finalists who have competed for Miss Kathmandu but did not win the title are:

- Aayusha Karki (2007) - Top 10, 3rd runner-up in Miss Nepal 2009.
- Kunchhang Moktan Tamang (2006; Top 5) - 1st runner-up, 2nd runner-up in Miss Nepal 2009.

== Winners ==
Year	Name	Hometown	Local Title	Age^{1}	Placement at Miss Nepal	Special awards at Miss Nepal	Notes
2017	Rojina Shrestha	Hattiban		23	1st Runner Up		
2016	Namrata Shrestha	Dhapasi		19	Top 5		
2015	Dibyata Vaidya	Ranipokhari		23	1st Runner Up		
2014	Prinsha Shrestha	Balaju	Miss ECollege 2009 1st runner up	22	1st runner-up	Beauty with Purpose; Miss Best Complexion	
2013	Ishani Shrestha	Kamaladi		21	WINNER	Miss Best Walk	
2012	Nagma Shrestha	Lazimapat	Miss ECollege	20	1st runner-up	Miss Best Smile	Top 8 in Miss Earth 2012
2011	Manisha Bista	Bhaktapur	Miss Bhaktapur	22	3rd runner-up	Miss Photogenic	
2010	Sadichha Shrestha	Kathmandu		19	WINNER	Miss Photogenic; Miss Personality; Miss Best Walk	
2009	Zenisha Moktan	Kathmandu	Miss Tamang	20	WINNER	Miss Best Walk	
2007	Bandana Sharma	Lalitpur		22	1st runner-up	Miss Photogenic	
2005	Shavona Shrestha	Lazimapat		23	1st runner-up	Miss Personality	
2004	Payal Shakya	Nayabazar		18	WINNER	Miss Photogenic	
2003	Priti Sitoula	Kathmandu		22	WINNER		
2002	Malvika Subba	Bansbari		21	WINNER	Miss Personality; Miss Best Hair; Miss Talent	She was unable to compete in Miss World 2002 due to having the national pageant scheduled at the same night as Miss World.
2000	Biva Mata Ranjeet	Jaishidewal		22	1st runner-up	Miss Best Walk	
1999	Shweta Shah	Kalanki		19	WINNER		
1998	Jyoti Pradhan	Nahikantole	Miss Nahikantole	19	WINNER	Miss Best Walk; Miss Photogenic	Later she got dethroned for not fulfilling her duties as Miss Nepal.
1997	Urmila Singh	Kathmandu		20	Top 10 Semi-Finalists		
1996	Poonam Ghimire	Kathmandu		23	WINNER	Miss Personality	
1995	Sumi Khadka	Kathmandu		18	WINNER		
1994	Annuradha Pudasaini	Bansbari	Miss Bansbari	22	1st runner-up	Miss Talent	

^{1} Age at the time of the Miss Nepal pageant
