= Miss Nepal 2002 =

- Date: December 7, 2002
- Venue: Birendra International Conference Convention Centre, Kathmandu
- Broadcaster: NTV
- Entrants: 16
- Winner: Malvika Subba; Dharan

The 8th Miss Nepal Pageant for 2002 was held at the Birendra International Convention Centre. There were protests by pro-women activists.

Malvika Subba was crowned Miss Nepal 2002 on December 7, 2002, at Birendra International Convention Center. Pinky Shah and Lhamo Yangchen Sherpa won the titles of 1st Runner up and 2nd Runner up respectively.

== Results ==
Color keys

- The contestant Won in an International pageant.
- The contestant was a Runner-up in an International pageant.
- The contestant was a Semi-Finalist in an International pageant.
- The contestant assumed another title.
- The contestant was not able to compete in an International pageant.
- The contestant did not place but won a Special Award in the pageant.
- The contestant did not place.

Final results	Contestant	International pageant	International Results
Miss Nepal 2002 (Winner)	(Nepal) Dharan - Malvika Subba	Miss World 2002	Did not compete
Miss Earth Nepal 2002	(Nepal) Lalitpur - Nira Gautam	Miss Earth 2002	Unplaced
1st runner-up	Kathmandu - Pinky Shah		
2nd runner-up	Kathmandu - Lhama Yangchen Sherpa		
Top 5	(Nepal) Biratnagar – Suchitra Acharya		
Top 5	Kathmandu – Aparna Shah		

=== Sub-Titles ===
Award	Contestant
Miss Personality	(Nepal) Dharan - Malvika Subba
Miss Best Hair	(Nepal) Dharan - Malvika Subba
Miss Talent	(Nepal) Dharan - Malvika Subba
Miss Best Dress	(Nepal) Jhapa - Prabha Kadariya
Miss Best Smile	(Nepal) Biratnagar - Sugan Sharma

=== Contestants ===
#	Contestants	Age	Height	Hometown	Placement
1	Malvika Subba	21	1.68 m (5 ft 6 in)	Dharan	Winner; Miss Personality; Miss Best Hair; Miss Talent
2	Aparna Shah	20	1.73 m (5 ft 8 in)	Kathmandu	3rd Runner Up
3	Pinky Shah	20	1.73 m (5 ft 8 in)	Kathmandu	1st Runner Up
4	Sabitri Giri	24	1.73 m (5 ft 8 in)	Kathmandu	
5	Usha Maharjan	22	1.73 m (5 ft 8 in)	Kathmandu	
6	Ranita Bhagat	25	1.75 m (5 ft 9 in)	Biratnagar	
7	Suchitra Acharya	21	1.70 m (5 ft 7 in)	Biratnagar	4th Runner Up
8	Srijan Bhujel	22	1.65 m (5 ft 5 in)	Kathmandu	
9	Prabha Kadariya	22	1.65 m (5 ft 5 in)	Jhapa	Miss Best Dress
10	Ramita Bhandari	20	1.78 m (5 ft 10 in)	Hetauda	
11	Neeta Makaju	20	1.65 m (5 ft 5 in)	Bhaktapur	
12	Lhama Yangchen Sherpa	25	1.70 m (5 ft 7 in)	Boudhanath	2nd Runner Up
13	Rabina Baidya	19	1.70 m (5 ft 7 in)	Kathmandu	
14	Sagun Sharma	20	1.70 m (5 ft 7 in)	Biratnagar	Miss Best Smile
15	Lama Lhaden	20	1.65 m (5 ft 5 in)	Lalitpur	
16	Anupa Bhandari	20	1.70 m (5 ft 7 in)	Chitwan	
