= Ashma Kumari KC =

Nepalese model (born 1998)

Ashma Kumari KC (born 6 November 1998) is a Nepali model born and brought up in Kathmandu. She is a beauty pageant titleholder who won Miss Nepal World 2024. Kumari will represent Nepal at the 73rd Miss World competition. She has a bachelor's degree in social work.
