= Dhading Besi =

Dhading Besi धादिङ्ग बेसी
- Town
- Location Dhading Besi (Nepal)
- Coordinates: 27°54′45.9″N 84°53′46.2″E
- Country: Nepal
- Province: Bagmati
- District: Dhading
- Municipality: Nilkantha Municipality

Dhading Besi (Nepali: धादिङ्ग बेसी) is a town located within Nilkantha Municipality in Nepal which is one of the two municipalities of the district and the headquarters of the Dhading District. It is also the administrative center of Nilkantha Municipality. The district also holds all of the major administrative buildings and structures of the district.

== Etymology ==
The word besi in the Nepali language means lowlands in the river basin which is the reason many people settled here. It is a small town along the banks of two rivers, Arun Khola and Thopal Khola (Khola means a small river in Nepali). Main settlement of the Nilkantha municipality is Puchhar Bazaar, Bich Bazaar, Milan Tole, and Siran Bazaar. Being the district headquarters, most of the government offices are located in the area.

It is at 27°54'45.9"N 84°53'46.2"E at an altitude of 612 metres.

== Facilities ==
The largest community college and many other private schools are located in Dhading Besi. The 50 bed Dhading District Hospital is also located in Dhading Besi.

== See also ==
- Dhading District
- Nepal
- Bagmati Zone
