= Sahana Bajracharya =

Miss Nepal 2010, model and television personality

- साहना बज्राचार्य
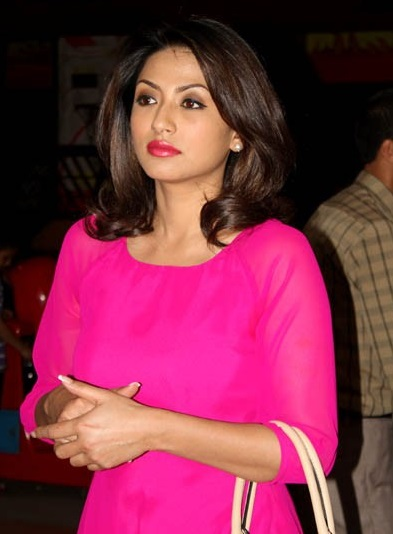
- Born: Sahana Bajracharya; August 15, 1989 (age 37); Kathmandu, Nepal
- Height: 1.72 m (5 ft 8 in)
- Beauty pageant titleholder
- Title: Miss Nepal Eaert 2010
- Hair color: Brown
- Eye color: Brown
- Major competitions: Miss Nepal 2010 first runner up Miss Earth 2010; Miss Asia Pacific World 2011; Miss Nepal 2008

Sahana Bajracharya (Nepali: साहना बज्राचार्य) is a Nepalese actress, TV host, model and beauty pageant titleholder who was crowned Miss Nepal Earth 2010. She was also the host of Mega Model Season 2, the local version of America's Next Top Model, and the TV show Namaste on NTV plus. She was the first woman to feature on the cover of TNM Magazine.

== Biography ==
Sahana Bajracharya was born on 15 August 1989 in Kathmandu, Nepal. She was educated at St. Mary's School, Jawlakhel, Lalitpur and attended college at Weigan and Leigh College.

== Career ==
Bajracharya became a media personality hosting TV shows such as Mega Model season 2, Yugantar and worked for Image Channel. In 2008, she competed in Miss Nepal 2008, but the pageant was later called off after protests from the female Maoists. Sahana had also been handpicked to represent Nepal in the Miss Supertalent of the World 2011 beauty pageant which was held in Korea in October where she was amongst the top 15.

She was crowned Miss Nepal Earth 2010 on 1 September 2010 and later competed in Miss Earth 2010 on 4 December 2010. She later joined Kantipur Television Network and hosted the TV show Frame by Frame which featured movie news and gossip. After getting fired from the Kantipur Television Network she started hosting another show, Namaste, for Nepal Television network.

== Filmography ==
Year	Film	Language	Notes
2012	Goodbye Kathmandu	Nepali	Guest Appearance

Awards and achievements
Preceded by Richa Thapa Magar (Nepal)	Miss Nepal Earth; 2010	Succeeded by Anupama Aura Gurung (Nepal)
