= Shrestha =

Śrēṣṭha is a Nepalese surname meaning "noble” or "great" in Sanskrit or "warrior" in Nepal Bhasa. Shrestha is one of the eponym surnames used by those belonging to the caste of Shresthas who prior to the unification of modern Nepal formed the ruling and administrative Kshatriya castes in the court of the Malla kings of Nepal. They also counted among them the trading and business Vaishya castes, and were the pre-eminent traders in between Nepal and Tibet. After the unification of Nepal, many Shresthas took up business and trading since their former positions as administrators and courtiers of the royal Malla court was supplanted by the invading Gorkha forces mainly of the Khas tribe.

== Language, Culture and Religion ==
The word "Shrestha" was derived from Sanskrit term Shista meaning 'noble' or 'decent'. Shresthas (or Syasya) served as administrators and courtiers during the rule of the Malla Newar kings that ruled Nepal for 600 years – known as the "Golden Era" of Nepal – when much of the cultural and architectural development of Nepal took place. They took a prominent role in the governance and administration of the nation and fought against the Gorkha invasion. They also bravely contributed to protect their country Nepal from external powers like the Mughal.

== Notable people ==
=== Politics and civil administration ===
- Ganga Lal Shrestha – Politician, One of the four famous Martyr of Nepal
- Gopal Man Shrestha – Politician, Deputy Prime Minister 2017-18
- Krishna Mohan Shrestha – First Inspector General of Armed Police Force (Nepal)
- Marich Man Singh Shrestha – Prime Minister of Nepal, 1986–90
- Narayan Kaji Shrestha – Politician, Deputy Prime Minister, 2011–12
- Krishna Kumar Shrestha – Politician, Member of the House of Representatives

=== Arts, literature and culture ===
- Siddhicharan Shrestha – "Yuga Kavi", one of the most prominent literary figures of Nepal
- Rakesh Shrestha – Celebrity Photographer in India
- Durga Lal Shrestha – Poet, lyricist
- Ganesh Lal Shrestha – Poet, lyricist
- Jagat Lal Shrestha – Educator, author
- Madan Krishna Shrestha – Comedian, actor, singer
- Shiva Shrestha – Actor
- Shree Krishna Shrestha – Actor
- Namrata Shrestha – Actress, model
- Sushma Shrestha – known by stage name "Poornima", Bollywood singer
- Nagma Shrestha – Miss Nepal Universe 2017 | Miss Nepal Earth 2012
- Shristi Shrestha – Miss Nepal World 2012
- Ishani Shrestha – Miss Nepal World 2013
- Asmi Shrestha – Miss Nepal World 2016
- Anushka Shrestha – Miss Nepal World 2019
- Bishnu Shrestha – Nepali soldier in Indian Army
