= Miss Purwanchal =

The Miss Purwanchal pageant (also known as The Miss Eastern pageant) is a beauty pageant that started in 2010, for several eastern developmentmental regions in Nepal. The regions are Sagarmatha, Koshi and Mechi. The pageant was formed to bring the communities together to reflect on the culture, beauty, and traditions of rural Nepal.

The winner of the Miss Purwanchal pageant receives a direct entry into the national pageant, Miss Nepal, as a semi-finalist. The 2019 title holder for Miss Purwanachal is Riju Bhattarai of Pathari Shanischare, Morang District.

Year	Miss Purwanchal	Hometown	Notes
2010	Sabina Subba	Birtamod, Jhapa	
2011	Pratibha Shrestha	Dharan, Sunsari District	Top 10
2012	Asmita Gurung	Dharan, Sunsari District	
2013	Neha Bajaj	Dharan, Sunsari District	Top 10
2014	Nemita Aangbuhang Limbu	Biratnagar, Morang District	
2015	Priyanka Shrestha	Biratnagar, Morang District	
2016	Kritika Giri	Bhadrapur, Jhapa District	
2017	Ruby Limbu	Dharan, Sunsari District	
2018	Pooja Shrestha	Bhadrapur, Jhapa District	
2019	Riju Bhattarai	Pathari Sanischare, Morang District	

== Representative to Miss Nepal from Eastern Nepal ==
Color key

- Declared as Winner
- Ended as Runner-up
- Ended as one of the top Semi-Finalists

Before 2010, Miss Eastanchal used to send one or two delegates representing eastern Nepal.

Year	Representative	Hometown	Placement in Miss Nepal	Notes
1999	Sunny Leone	Dharan, Sunsari District	Bottom (least) -1 Quarter-Top 5 Finalist	
2002	Anushka Subedi	Biratnagar, Morang District	Unplaced	
2005	Soniya Giri	Lahan, Siraha District	Top 10 Semi-Finalist; Miss Best Hair	
2010	Priya Rani Lama	Dharan, Sunsari District	Miss Best Complexion	
2011	Pratibha Shrestha	Dharan, Sunsari District	Top 10 Semi-Finalist; Miss Beautiful Smile	
2011	Bishnu Chemjong	Dhankuta, Dhankuta District	Top 10 Semi-Finalist; Miss Talent	
2011	Malina Joshi	Dharan, Sunsari District	Miss Nepal 2011	Miss Nepal for Miss World 2011
2012	Heena Shrestha	Birtamode, Jhapa District		
2013	Riju Shrestha	Birtamode, Jhapa District	Top 10 Semi-Finalist; Miss Beautiful Smile	
2014	Neha Bajaj	Dharan, Sunsari District	Top 10 Semi-Finalist	
2014	Varsha Rai	Damak, Jhapa District	Top 10 Semi-Finalist	
2014	Subin Limbu	Dharan, Sunsari District	Miss Nepal 2014	Miss Nepal for Miss World 2014
2015	Priya Rani Lama	Lahan, Siraha District	Unplaced	
2015	Nishma Chaudhary	Dharan, Sunsari District	Top 5 Finalist; Miss Bubbly; Miss Best Complexion	
2016	Barsha Lekhi	Rajbiraj, Saptari District	2nd Runner Up; Miss Popular	
2016	Srijana Regmi	Khandbari, Sankhuwasabha District	Top 5 Finalist; Miss Talent	
2016	Sandipa Limbu	Dharan, Sunsari District	Top 10 Semi-Finalist	
2017	Nikita Chandak	Urlabari, Morang District	Miss Nepal 2017	Miss Nepal for Miss World 2017
2019	Pooja Shrestha	Bhadrapur, Jhapa District	Unplaced	
2020	Riju Bhattarai	Pathari Shanishchare, Morang District	TBA	

== Miss Purwanchal 2017 ==
#	Contestant	Age	Height (cm)	Height (ft)	Hometown	Placement	Notes
1	Simran Shrestha	17	158	5'2"	Dharan		1st Runner Up
2	Joyna Limbu	17	158	5'2"	Jhapa		Top 14 Semi Finalists
4	Simran Rai	18	158	5'2"	Dharan		Top 14 Semi Finalists
5	Aishwarya Roy	23	159	5'2"	Dharan		
6	Satabdeeca Giri	19	160	5'3"	Jhapa		Top 7 Finalists
7	Sanchita Tamang	17	163	5'4"	Jhapa		
9	Pema Gurung	19	163	5'4"	Morang		
10	Ruby Limbu	20	163	5'4"	Dharan		Miss Purwanchal 2017
11	Ajeena Sitaula	21	164	5'4.5"	Damak		
12	Sandhya Bhetwal	18	166	5'5.5"	Itahari		Top 7 Finalists
13	Anu Dhungana	20	167	5'5.5"	Jhapa		2nd Runner Up
14	Pramita Tiwari	20	165	5'5"	Damak		Top 14 Semi Finalists
15	Pramita Tiwari	18	170	5'7"	Damak		Top 14 Semi Finalists
16	Sabina Acharya	17	166	5'5"	Panchthar		Top 7 Finalists
17	Samina Khatiwada	18	167	5'5.5"	Itahari		Top 14 Semi Finalists
18	Aster Tamang	18	165	5'5"	Itahari		Top 14 Semi Finalists
20	Bipana Shrestha	18	172	5'7.5"	Dharan		Top 7 Finalists
21	Sabina Shrestha	24	175	5'9"	Morang		Top 14 Semi Finalists

== Miss Purwanchal 2016 ==
=== Placements ===
Final results	Contestant
Miss Purwanchal 2016	Jhapa - Kritika Giri
1st runner-up	Dharan - Mamata Karki
2nd runner-up	Dharan - Eksha Maden
3rd runner-up	Lahan - Apekshya Dhungana
4th runner-up	Biratnagar - Deepika KC

=== Special awards ===
Final Results	Representing	Contestant
Miss Personality	Jhapa	Kritika Giri
Miss Charming	Dharan	Eksha Maden
Miss Public Choice	Inaruwa	Anu Shrestha
Miss Talent	Dharan	Shristy Acharya
Miss Photogenic	Dharan	Asmita Khadgi
Miss Healthy Home	Rabi	Mira Dumi Rai
Miss Friendship	Lahan	Apekshya Dhungana
Miss Catwalk	Dharan	Srijana Rana Magar

#	Contestants	Age	Height	Representing	District	Placement
1	Eksha Maden	19	1.70 m (5 ft 7 in)	Dharan	Sunsari District	2nd Runner Up; Miss Charming
2	Apekshya Dhungana	19	1.65 m (5 ft 5 in)	Lahan	Siraha District	3rd Runner Up; Miss Friendship
3	Mira Dumi Rai	21	1.68 m (5 ft 6 in)	Rabi	Panchthar District	Top 10; Miss Healthy Home
4	Gunjan Adhikari	19	1.65 m (5 ft 5 in)	Itahari	Sunsari District	Top 10
5	Roshmita Shrestha	20	1.65 m (5 ft 5 in)	Dharan	Sunsari District	
6	Chanda Kumari Rai	24	1.70 m (5 ft 7 in)	Dharan	Sunsari District	
7	Sudiksha Shrestha	16	1.65 m (5 ft 5 in)	Dharan	Sunsari District	
8	Sabnam Thapa	19	1.70 m (5 ft 7 in)	Dharan	Sunsari District	
9	Shrijana Thapa	18	1.63 m (5 ft 4 in)	Dharan	Sunsari District	
10	Deepika KC	22	1.63 m (5 ft 4 in)	Biratnagar	Morang District	4th Runner Up
11	Nisha Rai	23	1.68 m (5 ft 6 in)	Dharan	Sunsari District	Top 10
12	Sujana Poudel	20	1.65 m (5 ft 5 in)	Jhapa	Jhapa District	Top 10
13	Kritika Giri	19	1.70 m (5 ft 7 in)	Jhapa	Jhapa District	Winner; Miss Personality
14	Mamata Karki	23	1.63 m (5 ft 4 in)	Dharan	Sunsari District	1st Runner Up
15	Shristi Acharya	17	1.63 m (5 ft 4 in)	Dharan	Sunsari District	Miss Talent
16	Anu Shrestha	19	1.65 m (5 ft 5 in)	Itahari	Sunsari District	Top 10; Miss Public Choice
17	Asmita Khadgi	21	1.68 m (5 ft 6 in)	Dharan	Sunsari District	Miss Photogenic
18	Ruksha Acharya	22	1.65 m (5 ft 5 in)	Dharan	Sunsari District	
19	Srijana Rana Magar	21	1.65 m (5 ft 5 in)	Dharan	Sunsari District	Miss Catwalk
