= Miss Nepal 2017 =

22nd Miss Nepal/ 1st Miss Universe Nepal

- Date: 2 June 2017
- Venue: Hotel Annapurna, Kathmandu, Nepal
- Broadcaster: NTV; NTV PLUS; M&S VMAG
- Entrants: 20
- Miss Universe Nepal: Nagma Shrestha; Kathmandu
- Miss Nepal World: Nikita Chandak; Biratnagar

The Hidden Treasures Ruslan Miss Nepal 2017, the 22nd annual Miss Nepal beauty pageant, was held on 2 June 2017 at Hotel Annapurna in Kathmandu, the capital city of Nepal. The Nepalese delegates for Miss Universe 2017, Miss World 2017, Miss Earth 2017, Miss International 2017 and Miss Asia Pacific International 2017 were selected through the pageant.

== Overview ==
Miss Nepal 2016 Asmi Shrestha crowned her successor Nikita Chandak as the new Miss Nepal World 2017 who represented Nepal in the Miss World 2017.

At the same event, Roshni Khatri crowned her successor Rojina Shrestha as Miss Earth Nepal 2017 and Barsha Lekhi crowned her successor Niti Shah as Miss International Nepal 2017. Sahara Basnet was crowned as Miss Nepal Asia Pacific International.

Later in a special event held at Hotel Annapurna, Nagma Shrestha was crowned as the Miss Universe Nepal 2017 to represent Nepal at Miss Universe 2017.

The winner of Miss Nepal 2017 served as the brand ambassador of popular drink Fanta and WWF Nepal for a year. In addition, she received $1,000 as prize for winning the title. The auditions of Miss Nepal were held in Dharan, Birgunj, Chitwan, Nepalgunj, Pokhara, Butwal and Kathmandu.

NTV and NTV PLUS broadcast the pageant live and for the Nepalese abroad. Miss Nepal 2017 was live streamed on M&S V Magazine's official website.

== Results ==
Color keys

- The contestant Won in an International pageant.
- The contestant was a Runner-up in an International pageant.
- The contestant was a Semi-Finalist in an International pageant.
- The contestant assumed another title.
- The contestant was not able to compete in an International pageant.
- The contestant did not place but won a Special Award in the pageant.
- The contestant did not place.

Final results	Contestant	International pageant	International Results
Miss Universe Nepal 2017	Kathmandu - Nagma Shrestha	Miss Universe 2017	Unplaced
Miss Nepal 2017	(Nepal) Biratnagar - Nikita Chandak (●)	Miss World 2017	Top 40; Head-to-Head Challenge; 2nd runner-up - Miss Multimedia; Top 10 - People's Choice Award; Top 20 - Beauty with a Purpose; Top 30 - Top Model
Miss Nepal Earth 2017	Kathmandu - Rojina Shrestha	Miss Earth 2017	Unplaced
Miss Nepal International 2017	(Nepal) Ghorahi - Niti Shah	Miss International 2017	Unplaced
Miss Nepal Asia Pacific 2017	(Nepal) Lalitpur - Sahara Basnet	Miss Asia Pacific International 2017	Unplaced
Top 7	(Nepal) Birgunj – Rojina Amatya Shrestha		
Top 7	Kathmandu - Rakchya Karki		
Top 7	(Nepal) Tansen - Manzari Singh		
Top 14	(Nepal) Bhadrapur - Priyanka Khadka		
Top 14	(Nepal) Bharatpur – Urusha Adhikari		
Top 14	(Nepal) Biratnagar – Barsha Pokharel		
Top 14	(Nepal) Butwal – Narmata Gurung		
Top 14	(Nepal) Dhading – Anusha Lamsal		
Top 14	Kathmandu – Aasina Baral		
Top 14	(Nepal) Lalitpur – Rinku Bajracharya		

(●): The candidate won the Miss Popular Choice Award (online voting) and got direct entry into Top 14 semi-Finalists.

=== Sub-titles ===
Award	Contestant
Best in Evening Gown	(Nepal) Biratnagar – Nikita Chandak
The Kathmandu Post Miss Intellect	(Nepal) Lalitpur - Sahara Basnet
Berger Miss Talent	(Nepal) Butwal - Narmata Gurung
Shree Ganapati Jewellers Miss Photogenic	(Nepal) Dhading - Anusha Lamsal
Miss Popular	(Nepal) Biratnagar - Nikita Chandak
Miss Friendship	Kathmandu - Rojina Shrestha
Miss Fascino	(Nepal) Ghorahi - Niti Shah
Miss Confident	(Nepal) Biratnagar - Nikita Chandak
Beauty with a Purpose	(Nepal) Biratnagar - Dristi Katwal
Miss Best Complexion	(Nepal) Ghorahi - Niti Shah
Miss Athletic	(Nepal) Tansen - Manzari Singh

=== Contestants ===
#	Contestants	Age	Height	Representing	Home Town	Placement	Special Award
1	Swostika Silwal	19	1.72 m (5 ft 8 in)	Lalitpur	Lalitpur District		
2	Rinku Bajracharya	23	1.70 m (5 ft 7 in)	Lalitpur	Lalitpur District	Top 14	
3	Priyanka Khadka	22	1.68 m (5 ft 6 in)	Bhadrapur	Jhapa District	Top 14	
4	Anusha Lamsal	22	1.71 m (5 ft 7 in)	Dhading	Dhading District	Top 14	Miss Photogenic
5	Narmata Gurung	20	1.72 m (5 ft 8 in)	Butwal	Rupandehi District	Top 14	Miss Talent
6	Rojina Amatya Shrestha	22	1.73 m (5 ft 8 in)	Birgunj	Parsa District	Top 7 Finalists	
7	Rojina Shrestha	23	1.78 m (5 ft 10 in)	Kathmandu	Kathmandu District	Miss Earth Nepal	Miss Friendship
8	Aasina Baral	19	1.73 m (5 ft 8 in)	Kathmandu	Kathmandu District	Top 14	
9	Anita Bhandari	24	1.77 m (5 ft 10 in)	Syangja	Syangja District		
10	Rakchya Karki	23	1.75 m (5 ft 9 in)	Kathmandu	Kathmandu District	Top 7 Finalists	
11	Niti Shah	21	1.70 m (5 ft 7 in)	Ghorahi	Dang District	Miss International Nepal	Miss Fascino; Best Complexion
12	Urusha Adhikari	22	1.73 m (5 ft 8 in)	Bharatpur	Chitwan District	Top 14	
13	Manzari Singh	22	1.70 m (5 ft 7 in)	Tansen	Palpa District	Top 7 Finalists	Miss Athletic
14	Nikita Chandak	20	1.75 m (5 ft 9 in)	Biratnagar	Morang District	Miss World Nepal	Miss Confident; Miss Popular Choice
15	Gyani Maiya Baral	23	1.69 m (5 ft 7 in)	Pokhara	Kaski District		
16	Dristi Katwal	23	1.68 m (5 ft 6 in)	Biratnagar	Morang District		Beauty with a Purpose
17	Sahara Basnet	22	1.70 m (5 ft 7 in)	Lalitpur	Lalitpur District	Miss Asia Pacific Nepal	Miss Intellect
18	Barsha Pokharel	22	1.72 m (5 ft 8 in)	Biratnagar	Morang District	Top 14	Miss Beautiful Hair
19	Kritika Giri	19	1.70 m (5 ft 7 in)	Bhadrapur	Jhapa District		

1. Niti Shah is the 1st runner up of Face of House of Fashion Season 1.
2. Narmata Gurung is the winner of Hunt for Supermodel Season 2 (2016) which was organized in Hong Kong.

== Previous Experience ==
- (#1) Eksha Maden was 2nd runner up in Miss Purwanchal 2016 regional pageant which gave her the direct entry to Miss Nepal 2017 Top 20 contestants.
- (#2) Sadikshya Pandey is the winner of Miss Pokhara 2016 regional pageant giving her a sport in Nepal 2017 Top 20 contestants.

- (#3) Suman Gurung is the winner of Miss Chitwan 2017 regional pageant which gave her the direct entry to Miss Nepal 2017 Top 20 contestants.
