= Miss Nepal 2018 =

23rd Miss Nepal/ 2nd Miss Universe Nepal

- Date: 11 April 2018
- Venue: Hotel Annapurna, Kathmandu, Nepal
- Broadcaster: NTV & NTV PLUS
- Entrants: 25
- Placements: 15
- Miss Universe Nepal: Manita Devkota; Gorkha
- Miss Nepal World: Shrinkhala Khatiwada; Heatuda

Hidden Treasures Ruslan FM 95.2 Miss Nepal 2018, the 23rd annual Miss Nepal beauty pageant, was held on 11 April 2018 at Hotel Annapurna in Kathmandu, the capital city of Nepal. The representatives for Miss Universe 2018, Miss World 2018, Miss Earth 2018, Miss International 2018 and Miss Supranational 2018 were selected through the pageant.

== Overview ==
At the event, Nagma Shrestha crowned her successor Manita Devkota as the Miss Universe Nepal 2018 for the first time in an ongoing Miss Nepal contest. Nikita Chandak crowned her successor Shrinkhala Khatiwada as Miss World Nepal 2018. Rojina Shrestha Crowned her successor Priya Sigdel as Miss Earth Nepal 2018. Niti Shah crowned her successor Ronali Amatya as the Miss International Nepal 2018. Mahima Singh was selected for Miss Supranational Nepal 2018.

In addition, the winners were received Rs 100,000 as prize for winning the title. The auditions of Miss Nepal were held from February 4-17 in Birtamode, Birgunj, Butwal, Chitwan, Dhangadhi, Dharan, Nepalgunj, Pokhara and Kathmandu.

NTV and NTV PLUS broadcast the pageant live and for the Nepalese abroad.

== Results ==
Color keys

- The contestant was a Semi-Finalist in an International pageant.
- The contestant did not place.

Placement	Contestant	International pageant	International placement
Miss Universe Nepal 2018	Gorkha – Manita Devkota	Miss Universe 2018	Top 10; National Gift Auction First Prize
Miss Nepal World 2018	Hetauda – Shrinkhala Khatiwada	Miss World 2018	Top 12; Head-to-Head Challenge (Round 1); Beauty with a Purpose; Miss Multimedia; 2nd runner-up - Sanya Tourism Promotional Video; Top 32 - Top Model
Miss Nepal Earth 2018	Kathmandu – Priya Sigdel	Miss Earth 2018	Top 18; (silver) Talent (Fire Group); Best Eco-Video Award; DV Boer Ambassadress
Miss Nepal International 2018	Kathmandu – Ronali Amatya	Miss International 2018	Unplaced
Miss Nepal Supranational 2018	Kathmandu – Mahima Singh	Miss Supranational 2018	Unplaced
Top 7	Hile – Sayara Lama		
Top 7	Kathmandu – Ashma Dhungana		
Top 15	Bhaktapur – Aastha Sakha (●)	Miss Asia Pacific International 2018	Unplaced
Top 15	Bhairahawa – Laxmi Poudel		
Top 15	Bhaktapur – Shristi Karki		
Top 15	Bharatpur – Sandhya Adhikari		
Top 15	Ghorahi – Suvekshya Shrestha		
Top 15	Kathmandu – Megha Shrestha		
Top 15	Kathmandu – Sharwani Pandey		
Top 15	Pokhara – Jyotshna Chettri		

(●): The candidate is the winner of Miss Popular Choice (online voting) and got direct entry into Top 15 semi-Finalists.

=== Sub-titles ===
Award	Contestant
Miss Athletic	Kathmandu – Megha Shrestha
Beauty with a Purpose	Kathmandu - Priya Sigdel
Miss Confident	(Nepal) Bhaktapur - Aastha Sakha
The Kathmandu Post Miss Intellect	Kathmandu - Ashma Dhungana
Berger Miss Talent	Kathmandu - Ronali Amatya
Shree Ganapati Jewellers Miss Photogenic	Kathmandu - Mahima Singh
Miss Fascino	(Nepal) Hetauda - Shrinkhala Khatiwada
Miss Friendship	(Nepal) Hile - Sayara Lama
Miss Glamour	(Nepal) Gorkha - Manita Devkota
Miss Popular Choice	(Nepal) Chitwan - Sandhya Adhikari

=== Contestants ===
#	Contestants	Age	Height	Home Town	Education
1	Mahima Singh	22	5 ft 7 in (1.70 m)	Kathmandu, Kathmandu District	BBA
2	Ronali Amatya	22	5 ft 7 in (1.70 m)	Kathmandu, Kathmandu District	BBA
3	Kashya Adhikari	23	5 ft 6.6 in (1.69 m)	Birgunj, Parsa District	BBA
4	Anupama Bastola	23	5 ft 7.5 in (1.71 m)	Biratnagar, Morang District	BA in Mass Communication
5	Sandhya Adhikari	23	5 ft 6.5 in (1.69 m)	Bharatpur, Chitwan District	Dental Medicine
6	Sharwani Pandey	21	5 ft 7.5 in (1.71 m)	Kathmandu, Kathmandu District	BA in English Literature
7	Sushmita Sapkota	22	5 ft 6 in (1.68 m)	Chitwan, Chitwan District	Chartered Accountancy
8	Priya Sigdel	23	5 ft 10 in (1.78 m)	Kathmandu, Kathmandu District	Development Studies
9	Shikshya Sangroula	22	5 ft 6 in (1.68 m)	Biratnagar, Morang District	BBA
10	Manita Devkota	23	5 ft 9 in (1.75 m)	Gorkha, Gorkha District	Public Health Degree
11	Anashrut Pant	22	5 ft 8 in (1.73 m)	Kathmandu, Kathmandu District	
12	Jyotshna Chettri	24	5 ft 8 in (1.73 m)	Pokhara, Kaski District	BA Nursing
13	Laxmi Pant	22	5 ft 6 in (1.68 m)	Mahendranagar, Kanchanpur District	
14	Suvekshya Shrestha	22	5 ft 9.5 in (1.77 m)	Ghorahi, Dang District	Pharmacy
15	Laxmi Poudel	22	5 ft 7 in (1.70 m)	Bhairahawa, Rupandehi District	Business Studies
16	Aastha Saakha	21	5 ft 7.5 in (1.71 m)	Bhaktapur, Bhaktapur District	
17	Mamta Joshi	21	5 ft 7 in (1.70 m)	Pokhara, Kaski District	BA Nursing
18	Sayara Lama	22	5 ft 5.5 in (1.66 m)	Hile, Dhankuta District	B.Sc. (Hons.) Agriculture
19	Ashma Dhungana	21	5 ft 7 in (1.70 m)	Kathmandu, Kathmandu District	BBA
20	Megha Shrestha	22	5 ft 7.8 in (1.72 m)	Kathmandu, Kathmandu District	
21	Shristi Karki	22	5 ft 5 in (1.65 m)	Bhaktapur, Bhaktapur District	BA in Mass Communication
22	Aalisha Adhikari	22	5 ft 6 in (1.68 m)	Surunga, Jhapa District	
23	Alisha Budathoki	20	5 ft 8 in (1.73 m)	Bhaktapur, Bhaktapur District	IT
24	Anjila Mahat	22	5 ft 8.5 in (1.74 m)	Kathmandu, Kathmandu District	BA Nursing
25	Shrinkhala Khatiwada	22	5 ft 7.6 in (1.72 m)	Hetauda, Makwanpur District	B.E Architecture

== Previous Experience ==
- (#1) Mahima Singh was Top 8 in Face of House of Fashion Season 1.
- (#2) Ronali Amatya is the winner of Model Hunt Nepal 2016 and Miss Eco International Nepal 2017.
- (#3) Kaysha Adhikari was Miss Angel 2010 2nd Runner Up.
- (#4) Anupama Bastola works as a RJ in her hometown, Biratnagar.
- (#7) Susmita Sapkota made it in Nepal Idol Season 1 Quarter Finalists.
- (#9) Shikshya Sangroula is winner of Little Queen Nepal 2007 winner and Face of Liril Season 2.
- (#14) Suvekshya Shrestha is Miss Teen Nepal 2013 2nd runner up.
- (#17) Mamta Joshi is Miss Pokhara 2017 which gave her a direct entry to Miss Nepal 2018 Top 25.
- (#20) Megha Shrestha is winner of Miss University Osaka 2016.
- (#21) Shristi Karki has acted in a movie called Gangster Blues.
- (#22) Aalisha Adhikari was Miss Mechi 2016 Top 5 Finalists.
