= Karuna Ratna Tuladhar =

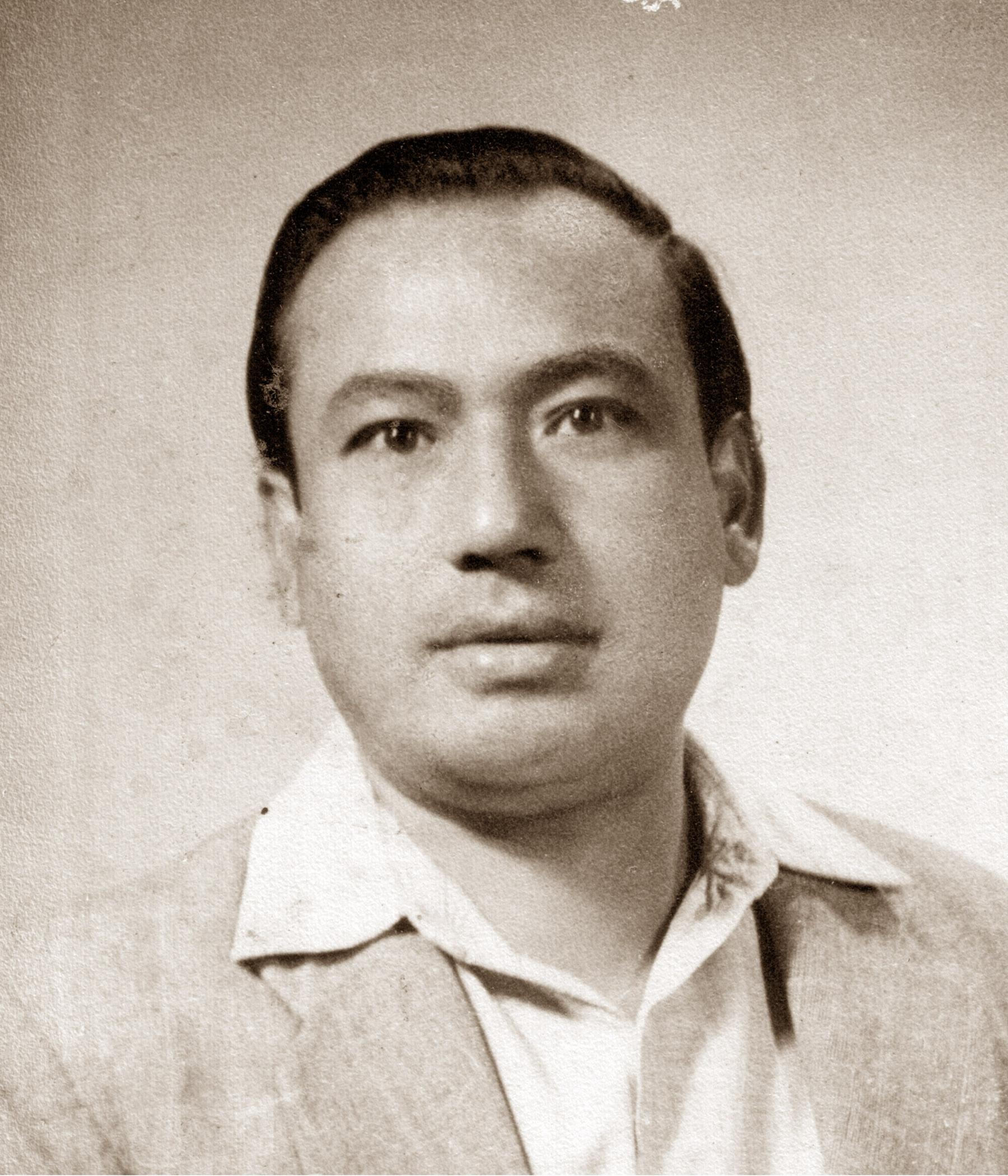
Karuna Ratna Tuladhar in 1963

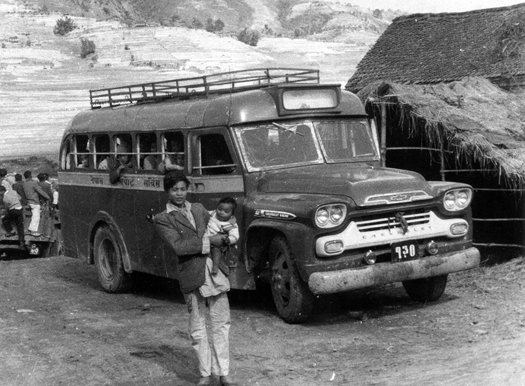
1959 model Chevrolet Viking bus of Nepal Transport Service shown in 1961.

Karuna Ratna Tuladhar (Nepali: करुणारत्न तुलाधर) (23 October 1920 – 19 July 2008) was a pioneer of Nepalese public transport. He was proprietor of Nepal Transport Service which he and his brother Lupau Ratna Tuladhar founded in 1959. This was Nepal's first public bus service which linked the capital Kathmandu with the railhead of Amlekhganj, 190 kilometers to the south near the Indian border.

The same year, Nepal Transport Service also started the first local shuttle between Kathmandu and Patan (Lalitpur), one of the three cities in the Kathmandu Valley.

== Early life ==
Tuladhar was born at Dhalasikwa in Asan, Kathmandu, the second of three sons of trader Pushpa Sundar Tuladhar and his wife Dhan Maya. Pushpa Sundar owned a business house in Lhasa, Tibet which conducted trade between Nepal, Tibet and India, transporting merchandise over the Himalaya by mule caravan.

== Business in Lhasa ==
After a brief period of schooling under Jagat Lal Master, Karuna Ratna Tuladhar went to Lhasa and joined the family business. He travelled to Tibet for the first time in 1934. The journey at that time involved walking for two days, riding a vintage lorry and then a steam locomotive to the Indian border at Raxaul, followed by taking the Indian railway and a motorcar to Sikkim. From Sikkim, the merchants traveled by mule caravan to Lhasa which took 20 days. This trade route is an offshoot of the ancient Silk Road.

Tuladhar would subsequently make two more trips, spending a total of 17 years in the Tibetan capital. In 1948, in between his second and third tours, he married Hira Shobha Tamrakar. He served as president of the Nepalese Chamber of Commerce, Lhasa in 1952. He returned from Tibet for the last time in 1954 and managed the business from Kathmandu and Kalimpong in West Bengal, India, the start of the caravan route to Lhasa.

== Nepal Transport Service ==
Tuladhar decided to downsize his Tibet business and concentrate on home after Nepal's first highway Tribhuvan Highway opened to jeep traffic in 1956. After the road was improved to handle larger vehicles, Nepal Transport Service went into operation hauling freight with two Tata Mercedes-Benz trucks in March 1959.

The company started passenger service in July the same year with a lone bus. Subsequently, its fleet grew to 11 Tata Mercedes-Benz, Chevrolet and Bedford buses. Its head office was situated at the family home at 122 Asan Tyouda Tol, Kathmandu.

The initial years were profitable, but the company began racking up losses due to the long periods of downtime as major repairs needed to be done in India. Nepal Transport Service folded in 1966. Tuladhar died in Kathmandu in 2008.

== Postage stamp issued ==
On 31 December 2012, the Postal Services Department of the government of Nepal issued a commemorative postage stamp bearing portraits of Karuna Ratna and Lupau Ratna Tuladhar to honor their service to the nation. The stamp also shows a Chevrolet bus of Nepal Transport Service.

== Gallery ==
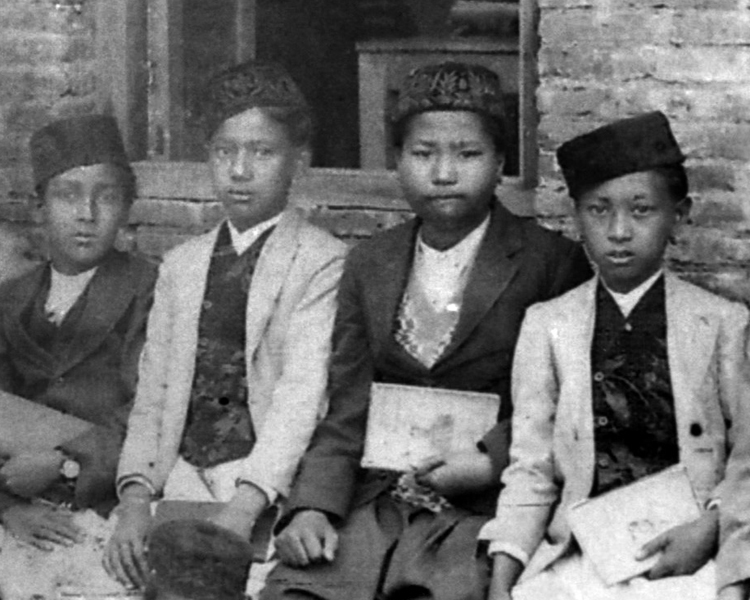
Tuladhar (second from left) in 1932 class photo.

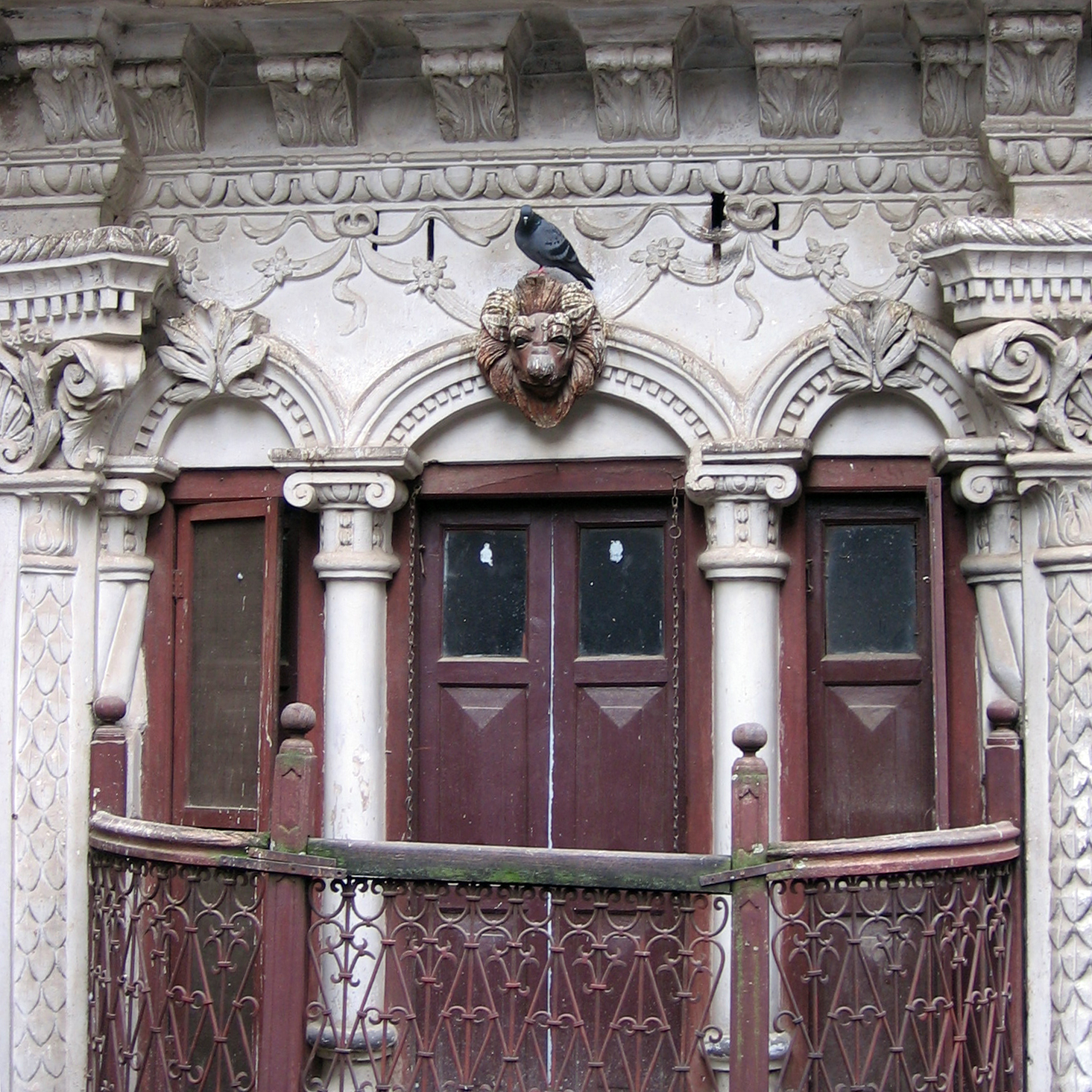
The Tuladhar home in Kathmandu.

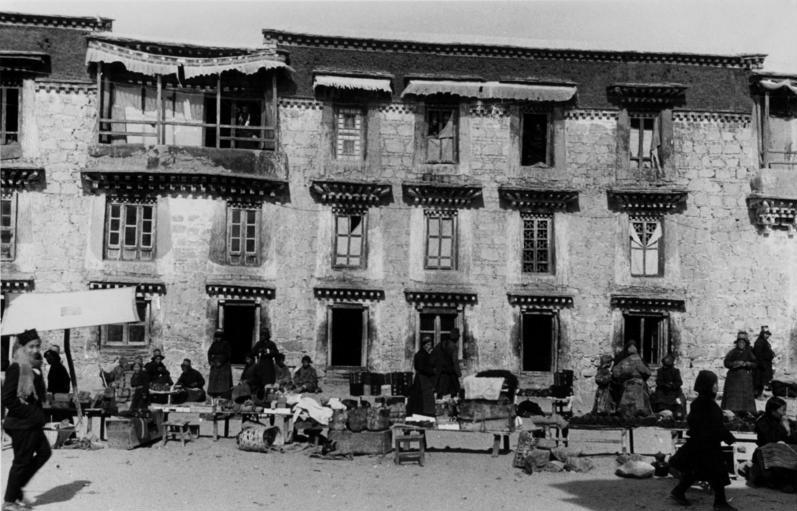
Tuladhar's shop in Lhasa (ground floor).

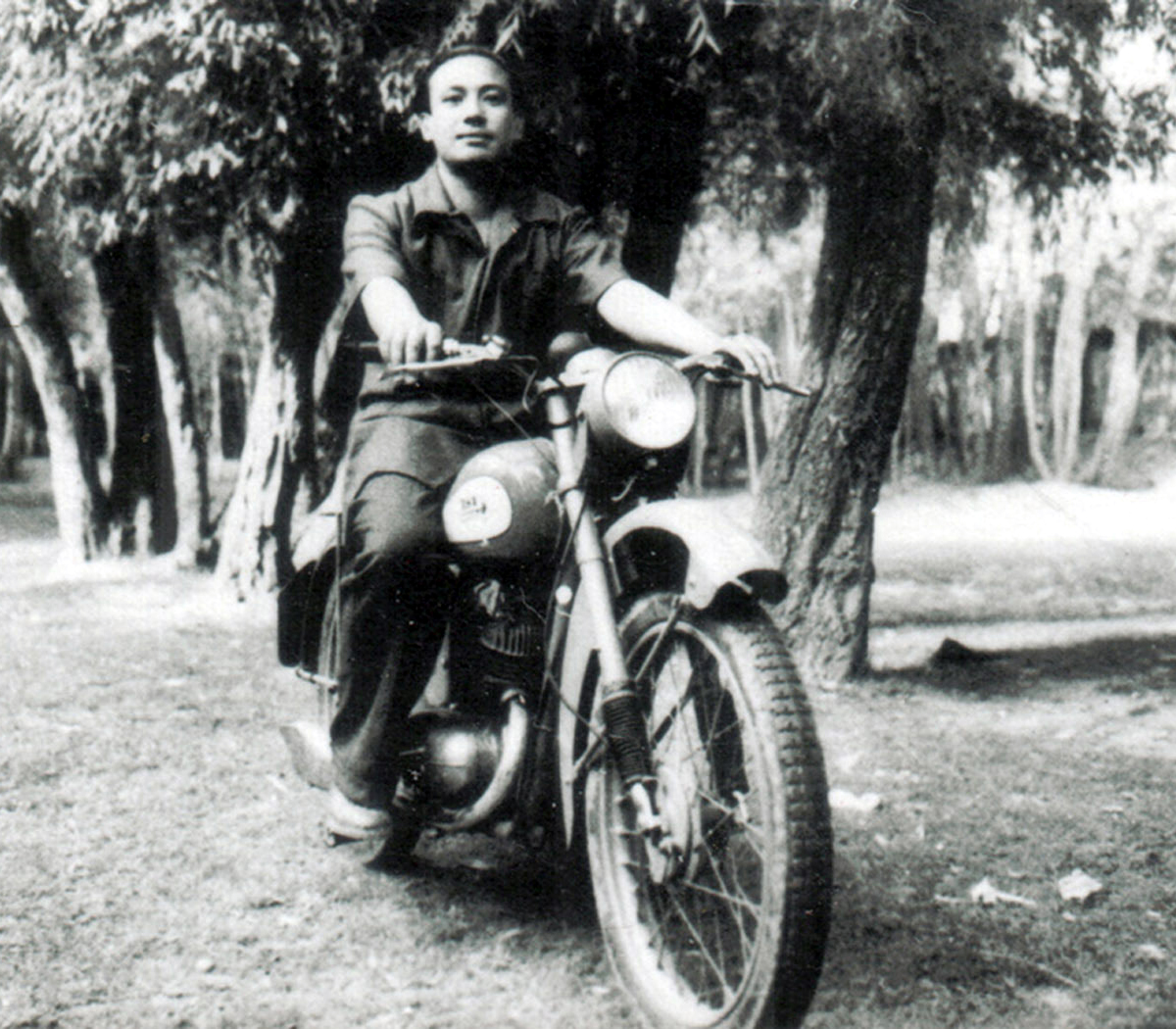
Tuladhar on a BSA in Lhasa in 1954.

== See also ==
- Lhasa Newar (trans-Himalayan traders)
