= Kesar Lall =

Nepalese writer and folklorist

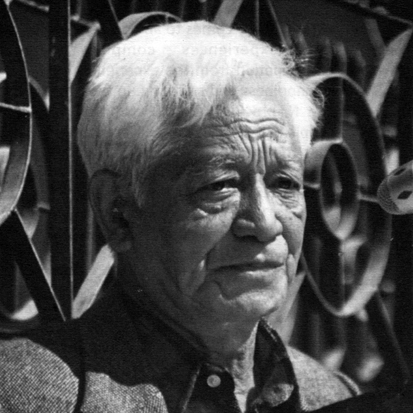
Kesar Lall

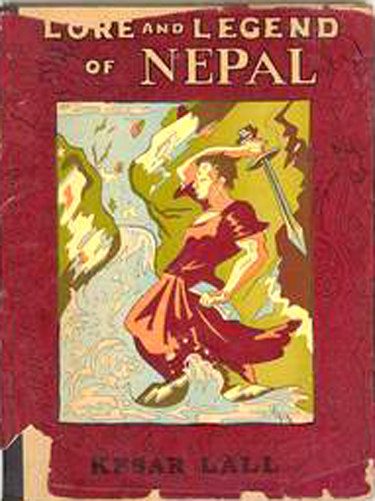
Lall's first book published in 1961

Kesar Lall (Nepali: केसर लाल; 15 July 1926 – 26 December 2012) (alternative name: Kesar Lall Shrestha) was a Nepalese folklorist and writer. He has published more than 50 books of stories and poetry. He wrote in Nepali, Nepal Bhasa and English.

== Early life ==
Kesar Lall was born in Kathmandu to father Jagat Lal and mother Bal Kumari Shrestha. His father ran a school at his home in Māsan Galli (मासं गल्लि), and was popularly known as Jagat Lal Master. This was one of the few places that provided a modern education in Nepal in those days as the Rana government discouraged the establishment of schools. Kesar Lall received no formal schooling. He learnt English from his father and taught himself to write composition by studying varied text books.

== Writing career ==
Kesar Lall began his writing career in 1945 by writing articles in English for Indian magazines. In 1953, he published his first story entitled Bhutucha ("Short girl") in Nepal Bhasa in Nepal magazine. He published his first book of folk tales entitled Lore and Legend of Nepal in English in 1961. Other books written by Lall are:

- Folk Tales From Nepal - Myths and Legends
- Folk Tales from Nepal - The Stolen Image and Other Stories
- Lore and Legend of the Yeti
- The Seven Sisters and Other Nepalese Tales
- Folk Tales from Nepal: The Origin of Alcohol & Other Stories
- Nepalese Customs and Manners

Kesar Lall is best known as a storyteller who exposed Nepal's folklore to the world by collecting, translating and publishing tales told in various Nepalese communities. He traveled across the country, listening to stories and taking down notes in longhand later at home because he said people were shy speaking in front of a tape recorder. He was also a poet and his poetry has been described as being simple and poignant.

While continuing to write, Kesar Lall pursued various jobs. In 1951, following the overthrow of the Rana regime and the installation of a new government, Kesar Lall secured a position as assistant private secretary to Prime Minister Matrika Prasad Koirala. He also worked for BP Koirala when he was home minister. Kesar Lall joined the US Embassy in Kathmandu in the late 1950s as advisor and translator where he remained until his retirement in 1985.
