= Lupau Ratna Tuladhar =

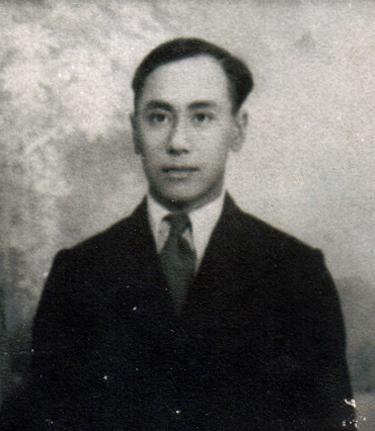
Lupau Ratna Tuladhar

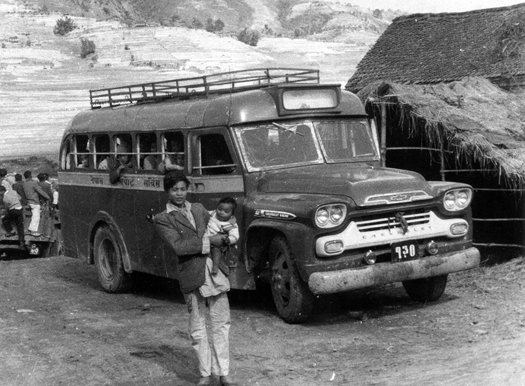
1959 model Chevrolet Viking bus of Nepal Transport Service shown in 1961.

Lupau Ratna Tuladhar (Nepali: लुपौरत्न तुलाधर; 22 June 1918 – 2 June 1993) was a Nepalese trader and transport pioneer. He and his brother Karuna Ratna Tuladhar established Nepal Transport Service in 1959 and operated the first regular bus service in Nepal.

== Early life ==
Tuladhar was born in Asan Dhalasikwa, Kathmandu, the eldest of the three sons of father Pushpa Sundar Tuladhar and mother Dhan Maya. The Tuladhars were hereditary merchants and owned a business house in Lhasa, Tibet named Ghorasyar. They conducted trade between Nepal, India and Tibet, transporting goods over the Himalayan passes by mule train.

Lupau Ratna received informal education from private tutors in Kathmandu and attended high school in Kolkata. In 1932, he went to Lhasa and joined his father at the family shop. He traveled over the traditional route to Tibet in the north of Kathmandu, crossing the Himalaya at Nyalam (Kuti).

== Career ==
Tuladhar engaged in trade and lived in Lhasa till 1940 when he returned to Kathmandu. On 12 January 1942, he married Harkha Shobha Tamrakar of Maru. After his marriage, he moved to India and handled the Indian end of the family's Tibet business, dividing his time between Kalimpong and Kolkata in West Bengal. Kalimpong was then the starting point of the caravan route to Lhasa and a trade center.

In 1959, Tuladhar wound up the business in Kalimpong and returned to Kathmandu to start Nepal Transport Service. The company folded in 1966.

Tuladhar has published a number of articles on religious topics in Dharmodaya magazine in the 1940s.

== Postage stamp issued ==
On 31 December 2012, the Postal Services Department of the government of Nepal issued a commemorative postage stamp bearing portraits of Karuna Ratna and Lupau Ratna Tuladhar to honor their service to the nation. The stamp also shows a Chevrolet bus of Nepal Transport Service.

== See also ==
- Lhasa Newar (trans-Himalayan traders)
