= Pushpa Ratna Sagar =

Nepalese businessman (1922–2011)

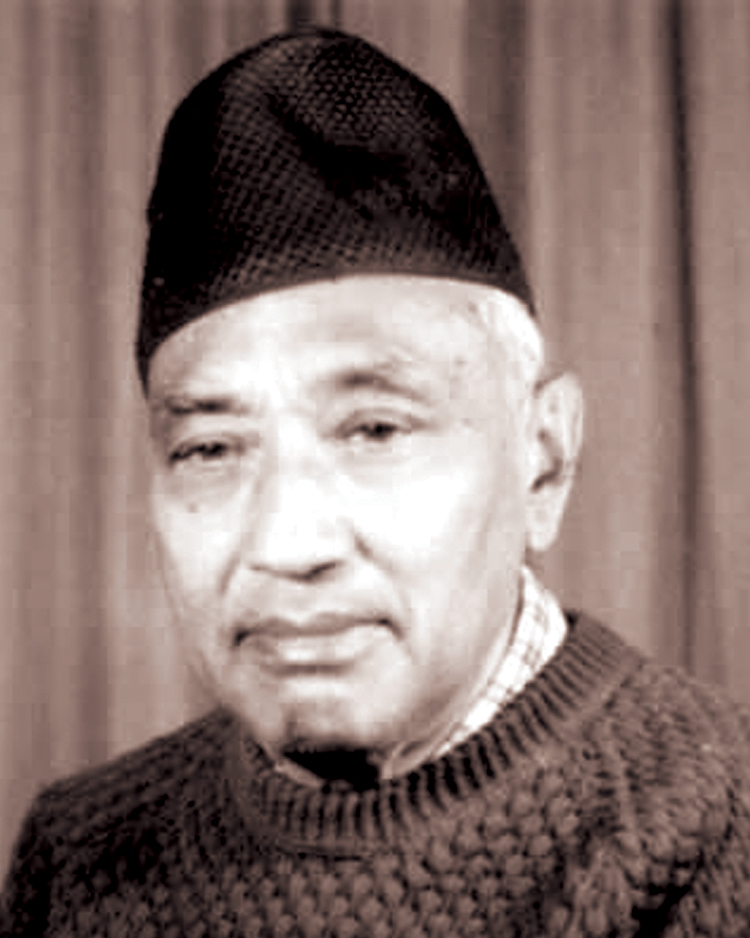
Pushpa Ratna Sagar

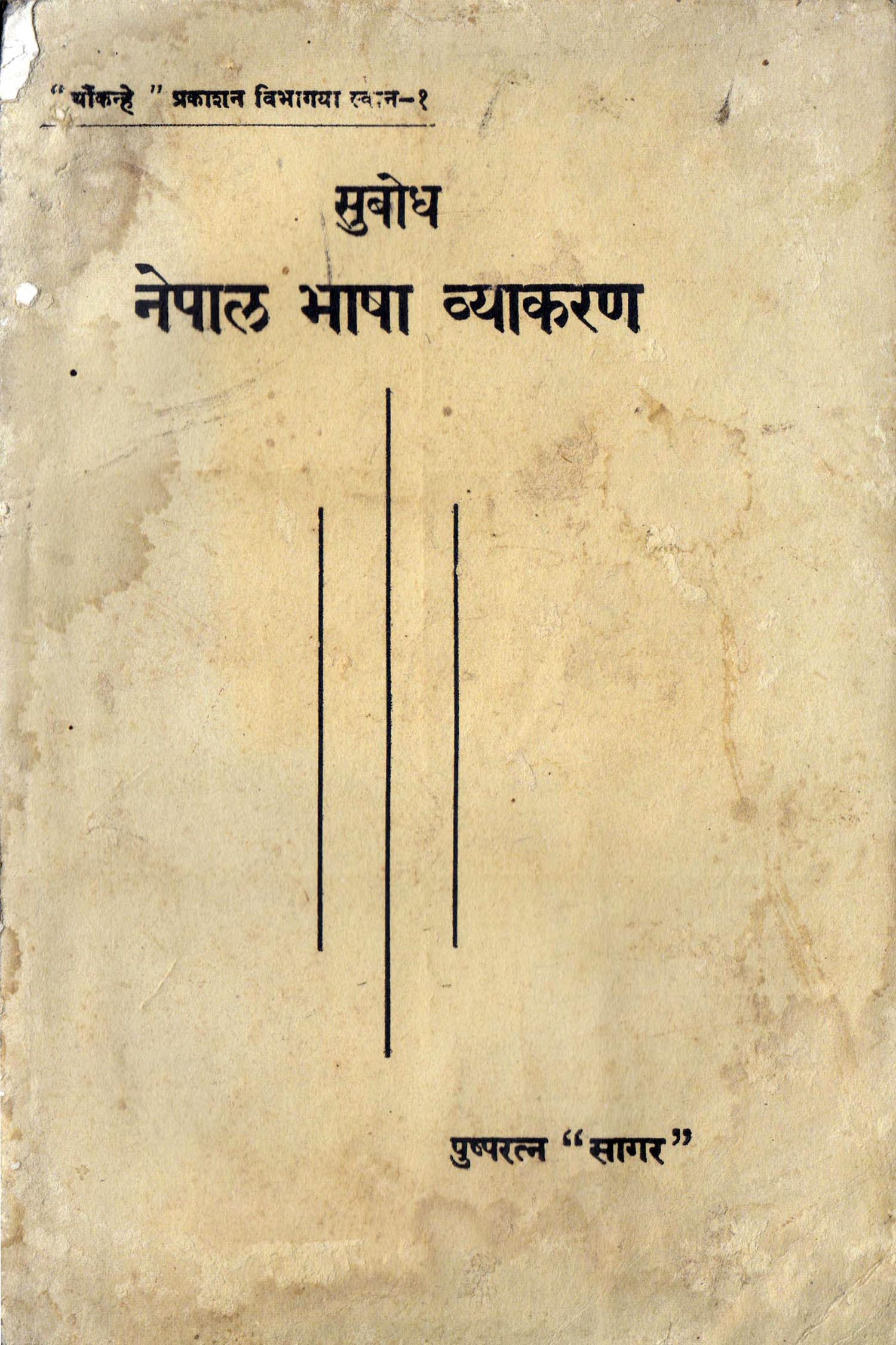
Cover of Nepal Bhasa grammar published in 1952.

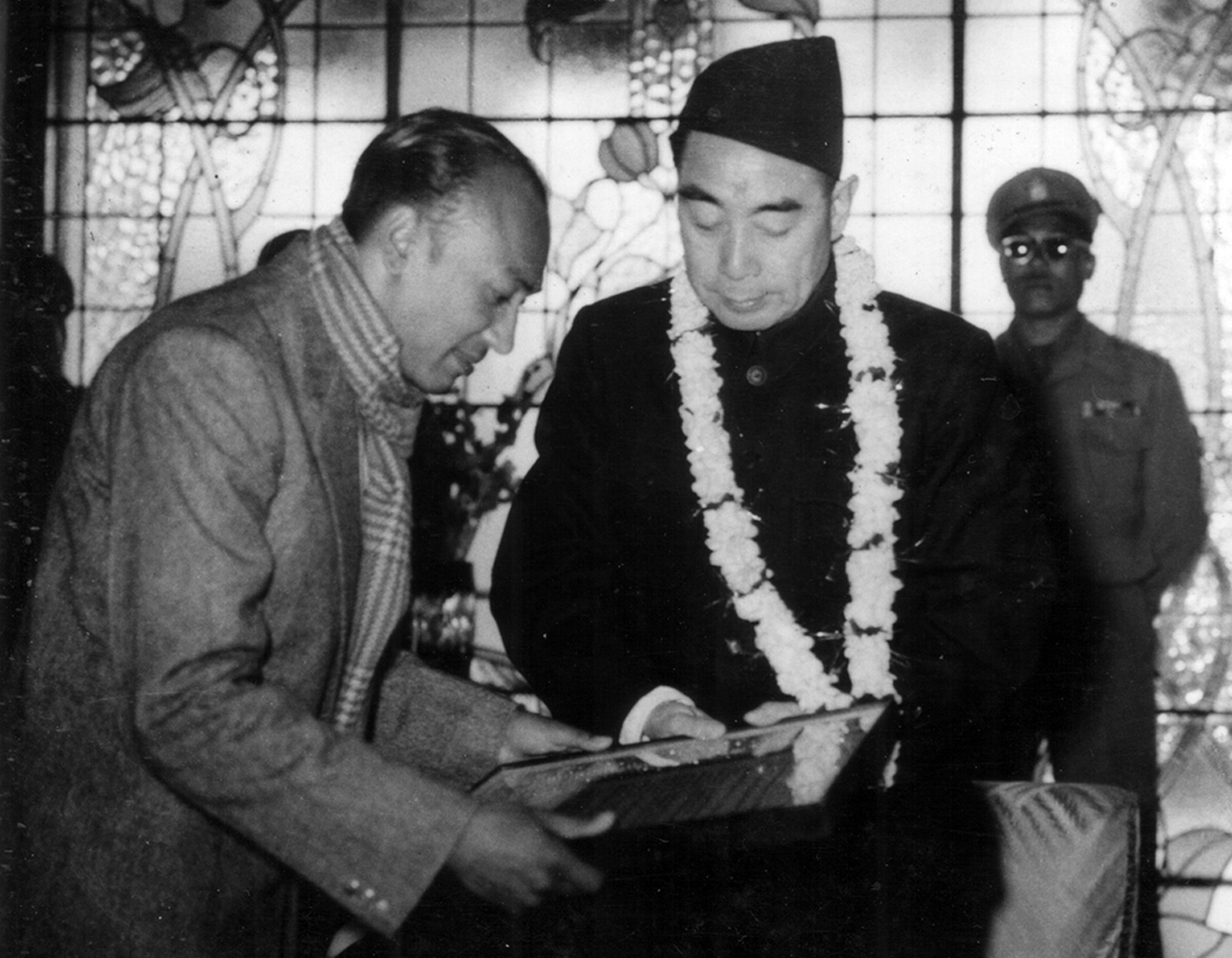
Sagar (left) with Chinese Premier Zhou Enlai in Kathmandu in 1957.

Pushpa Ratna Sagar (Nepali: पुष्प रत्न सागर) (born Pushpa Ratna Tuladhar) (29 October 1922 – 11 November 2011) was a Nepalese merchant, grammarian, lexicographer and pioneer pressman. Born Pushpa Ratna Tuladhar in Asan Dhalasikwa, Kathmandu, he acquired the nickname Sagar in his childhood during a pilgrimage to Ganga Sagar (Sagar Island) in India. He was the third and youngest son of trader Pushpa Sundar Tuladhar and his wife Dhan Maya.

== Early life ==
Sagar received primary education at a neighbourhood school conducted at the home of teacher Jagat Lal Master. He was married to Lani Devi Bania of Itum Bahal on 12 January 1942. In 1943, he left for Lhasa, Tibet to join his ancestral business house Ghorasyar.

== Career ==
While in Lhasa, he was stirred by the activism in Nepal against the suppression of Nepal Bhasa and imprisonment of writers by the Rana regime. He thought of doing something for his mother tongue, and started writing a grammar of the language that would be useful to students. In 1949, he returned to Kathmandu where he completed the manuscript. The grammar, entitled Subodh Nepal Bhasa Vyakaran, was published in 1952.

In 1951, Thaunkanhe, the first Nepal Bhasa monthly magazine to be published from Nepal, began publication with Sagar as the deputy editor. In a bid to promote publishing in Nepal Bhasa, Sagar formed a partnership with two like-minded former Tibetan traders, Purna Kaji Tamrakar and Ratna Man Singh Tuladhar, and in 1952 established Nepal Press at his home at 11/122 Asan Tyouda Tol, Kathmandu. Their equipment consisted of second-hand Vicobold letterpress machines imported from Kolkata.

Sagar was also active in a number of associations. He was a member of Dharmodaya Sabha (Society for the Rise of the Teaching), a Buddhist organization founded in 1944 in Sarnath, India by exiled Nepalese monks and dedicated to promoting Theravada Buddhism.

In 1957, he was secretary of the Kathmandu chapter of the Nepalese Chamber of Commerce, Lhasa when it hosted a reception to honour visiting Chinese Premier Zhou Enlai.

In 1960, Sagar set up Nepal Printing Press and continued his service to Nepal Bhasa. He compiled a dictionary of original words with meanings in Nepal Bhasa, Nepali and English, and in 1998, published it under the title Nepal Bhasaya Maulik Sabdakosh.

== Honors ==
On 31 October 1994, Nepal Bhasa Parishad decorated Sagar with the title Bhasa Thuwa (Patron of the Language).

He was made a patron of Nepal Lipi Guthi, an organization dedicated to preserving Nepalese scripts.

In 2008, chairman of the Constituent Assembly Subash Nemwang presented Sagar with a letter of felicitation to honour his contribution to Buddhism in Nepal at a function organised by Dharmodaya Sabha.

== Published works ==
- Subodh Nepal Bhasa Vyakaran (Understandable Nepal Bhasa Grammar), 1952
- Nepal Bhasaya Maulik Sabdakosh (Original Dictionary of Nepal Bhasa), 1998

== See also ==
- Lhasa Newar (trans-Himalayan traders)
