= Nepal Transport Service =

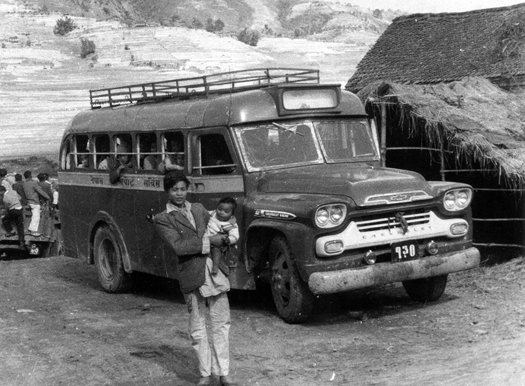
1959 model Chevrolet Viking bus of Nepal Transport Service in 1961.

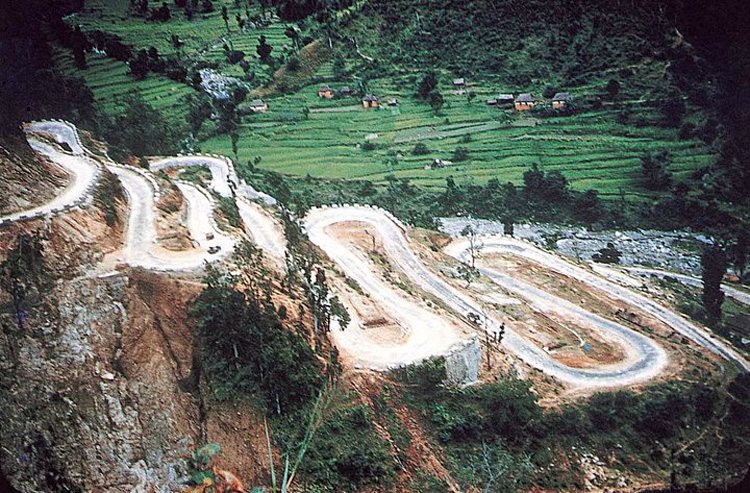
Hairpin bends known as Barha Ghumti on Tribhuvan Highway which connects Kathmandu with India.

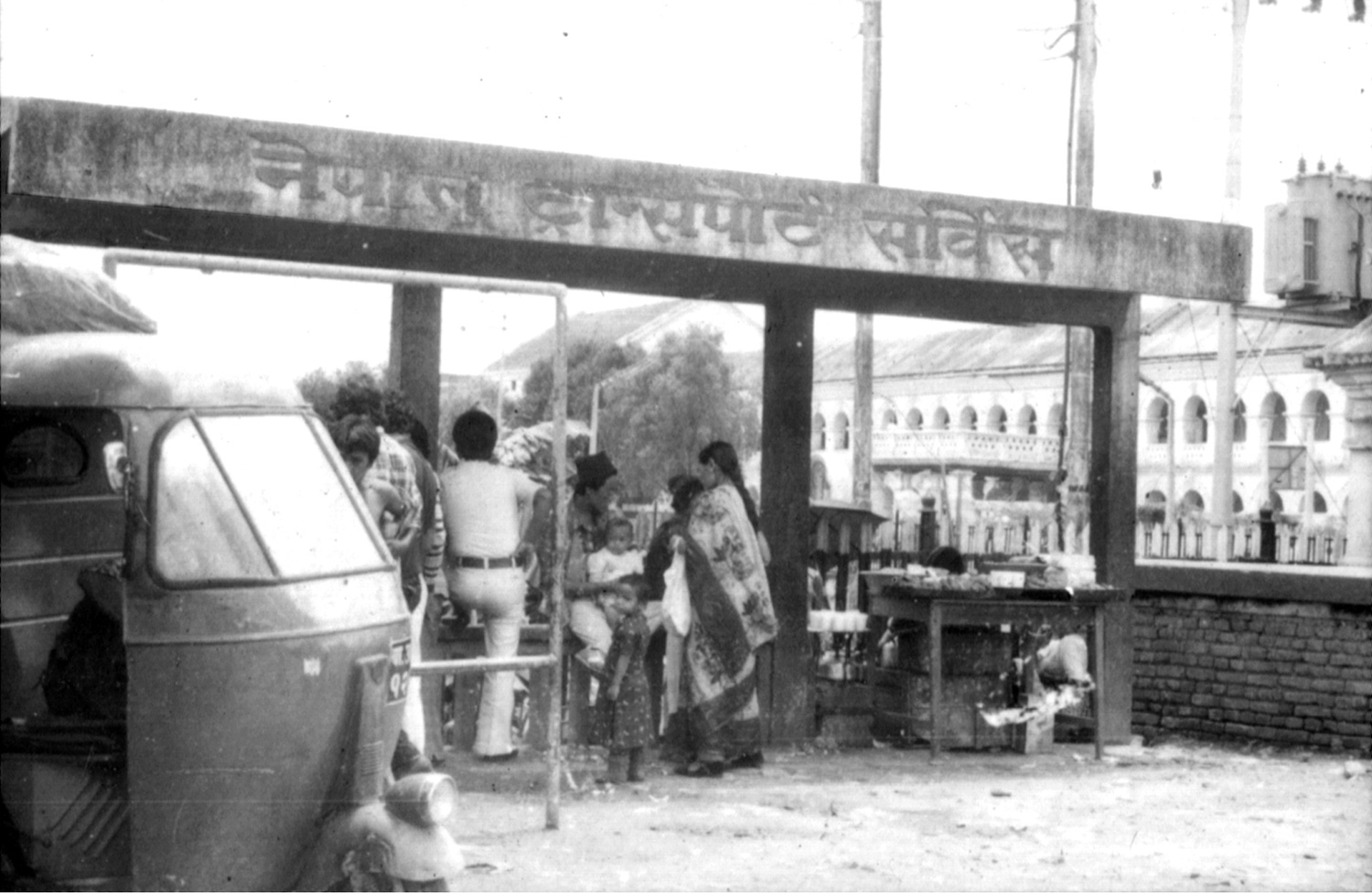
Bus stand at Rani Pokhari bearing the sign नेपाल ट्रान्सपोर्ट सर्विस (Nepal Transport Service).

Nepal Transport Service (Nepali: नेपाल ट्रान्सपोर्ट सर्भिस) was the first, and for a time, the largest, Nepalese public bus line. The company was based in the capital Kathmandu and operated from 1959 to 1966. Its head office was located at 122 Asan Tyouda Tol, Kathmandu.

The company was founded by proprietor Karuna Ratna Tuladhar (1920–2008) and Lupau Ratna Tuladhar (1918–1993) of Kathmandu. The brothers were former merchants who operated an ancestral business house in Lhasa that conducted trade between Tibet, India and Nepal.

Nepal Transport Service started as a trucking company in March 1959 hauling cargo between Kathmandu and the railhead of Amlekhganj near the Indian border, 190 kilometers to the south over Tribhuvan Highway. It is the country's first highway which opened to jeep traffic in 1956, and was subsequently improved to handle larger vehicles.

== Intercity service ==
In July 1959, Nepal Transport Service began a daily intercity bus service between Kathmandu and Amlekhganj over the serpentine highway that went over two ranges of hills. The route started at Sundhara near Dharahara tower and exited the Kathmandu Valley at Thankot. It climbed over the Mahabharat Range and descended to Hetauda and then went over the Sivalik Hills to Amlekhganj in the plains. Here, bus passengers transferred to the Nepal Government Railway (NGR) for their onward journey.

== Urban transportation ==
In September 1959, Nepal Transport Service started a local bus service between Kathmandu and Patan (Lalitpur), one of the three cities in the Kathmandu Valley, marking the beginning of urban transportation in Nepal. The bus stop in Kathmandu was located at the northwestern corner of Rani Pokhari. In Patan, the bus made stops at Mangal Bazaar, Lagankhel and Jawalakhel before returning to Kathmandu. The route was later shortened to Patan Dhoka, or Patan Gate, on the edge of the city.

In addition to its main Kathmandu-Patan service, Nepal Transport Service operated on various short-lived routes in the Kathmandu Valley.

== Routes ==
Location in Nepal

=== Long distance ===
- Kathmandu-Amlekhganj (bus and truck service)
- Kathmandu-Trishuli (truck service, April 1962)

=== Local ===
- Rani Pokhari-Patan Dhoka (1959–1966)
- Lainchaur-Jawalakhel (August–September 1962)
- Rani Pokhari-Gaushala (July 1963 – July 1964)
- Rani Pokhari-Balaju (August 1963 – May 1964)
- Rani Pokhari-Maharajgunj (April–May 1964)

== Fleet and livery ==
At its height, Nepal Transport Service owned a fleet of 11 buses and two trucks.

- 5 Tata Mercedes-Benz LP 312/36 buses manufactured by TATA Engineering and Locomotive Company of India.
- 4 Bedford SB4 buses manufactured by Hindustan Motors of India.
- 2 Chevrolet Viking buses manufactured by Hindustan Motors of India.
- 2 Tata Mercedes-Benz trucks.

The buses of Nepal Transport Service were painted a dark blue with the company name written in Devanagari on one side and English on the other on a white band below the windows.

== Dissolution ==
Nepal Transport Service went out of business in 1966, no longer able to sustain the losses resulting from frequent downtime. Breakdowns were common due to bad road conditions. Major maintenance had to be done in India, and unavailability of spare parts locally for its diverse fleet meant its buses were out of commission for extended periods.

During the company's final years, it fought an unsuccessful court battle over increasing income tax despite falling revenues as more and more of its aging buses went out of service.

== Postage stamp issued ==
On 31 December 2012, the Postal Services Department of the government of Nepal issued a commemorative postage stamp bearing portraits of the founders Karuna Ratna and Lupau Ratna Tuladhar to honor their service to the nation. The stamp also shows a Chevrolet bus of Nepal Transport Service.

== Gallery ==
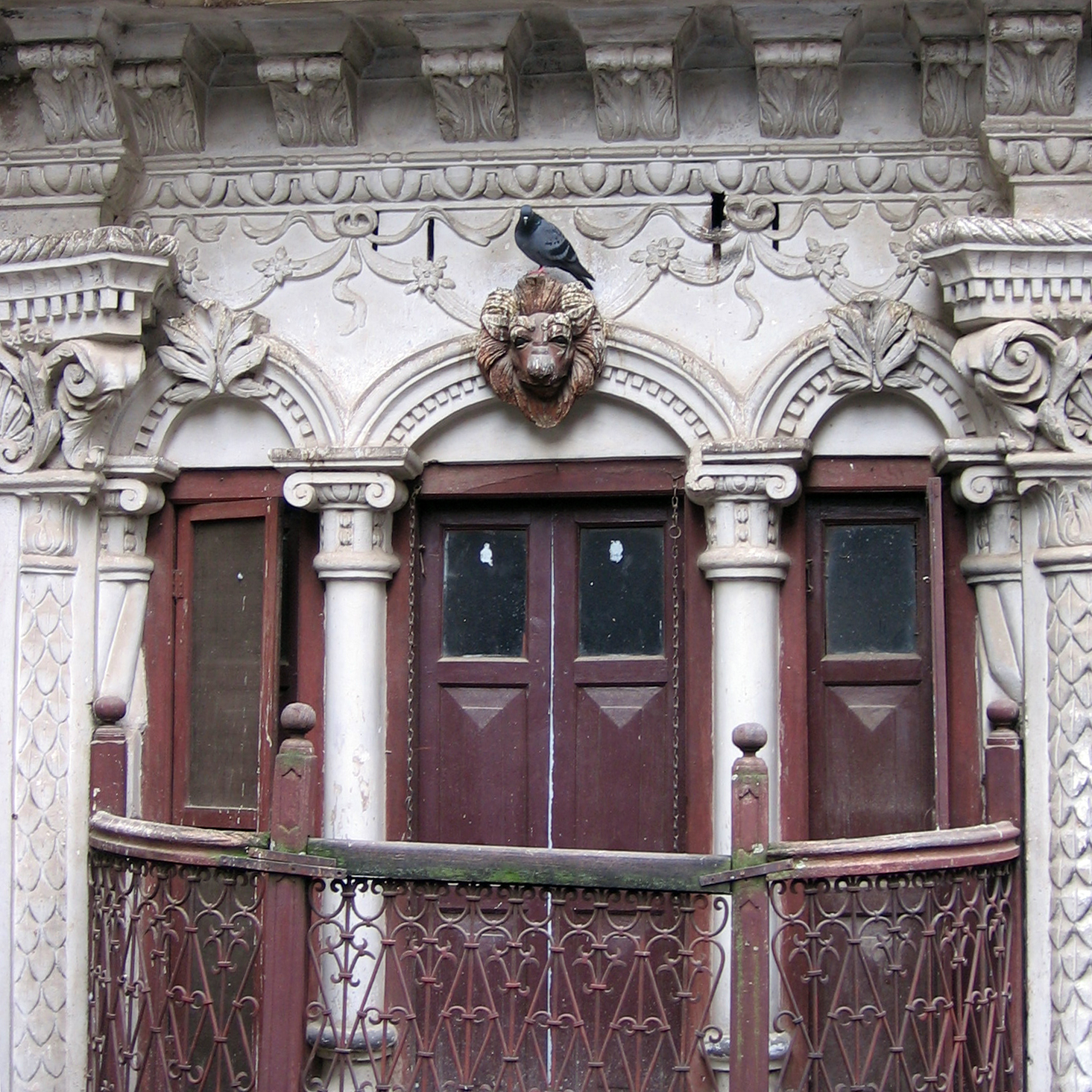
The head office was located in this house.

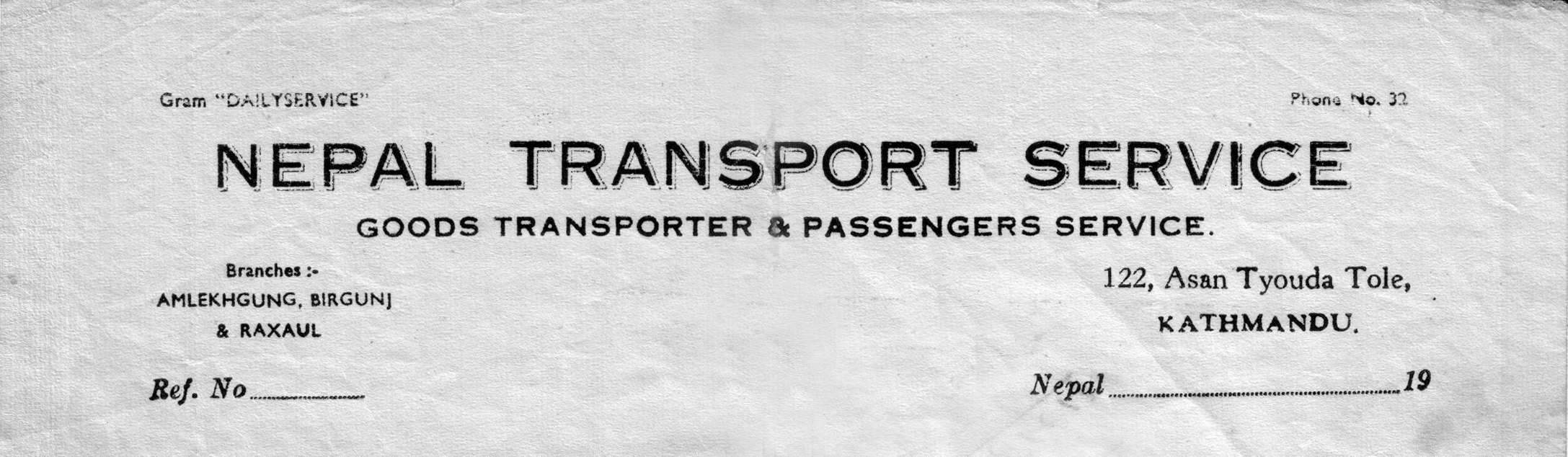
Letterhead

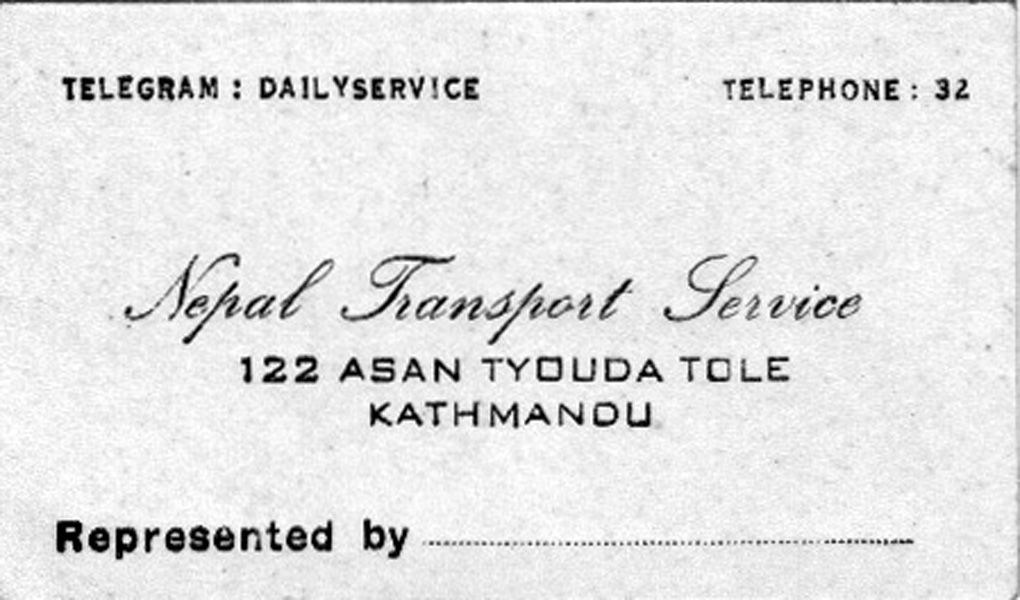
Visiting card

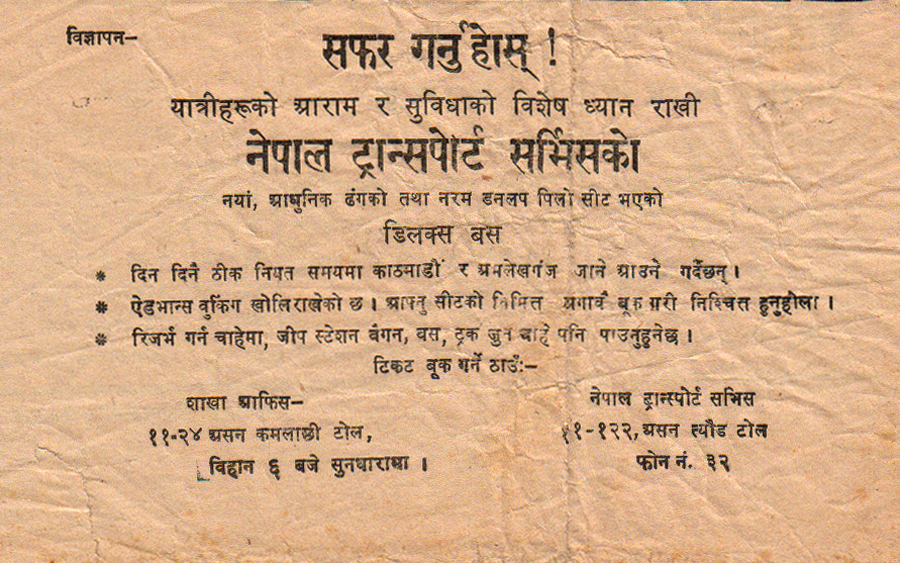
Ad in Gorkhapatra dated 23 December 1959.

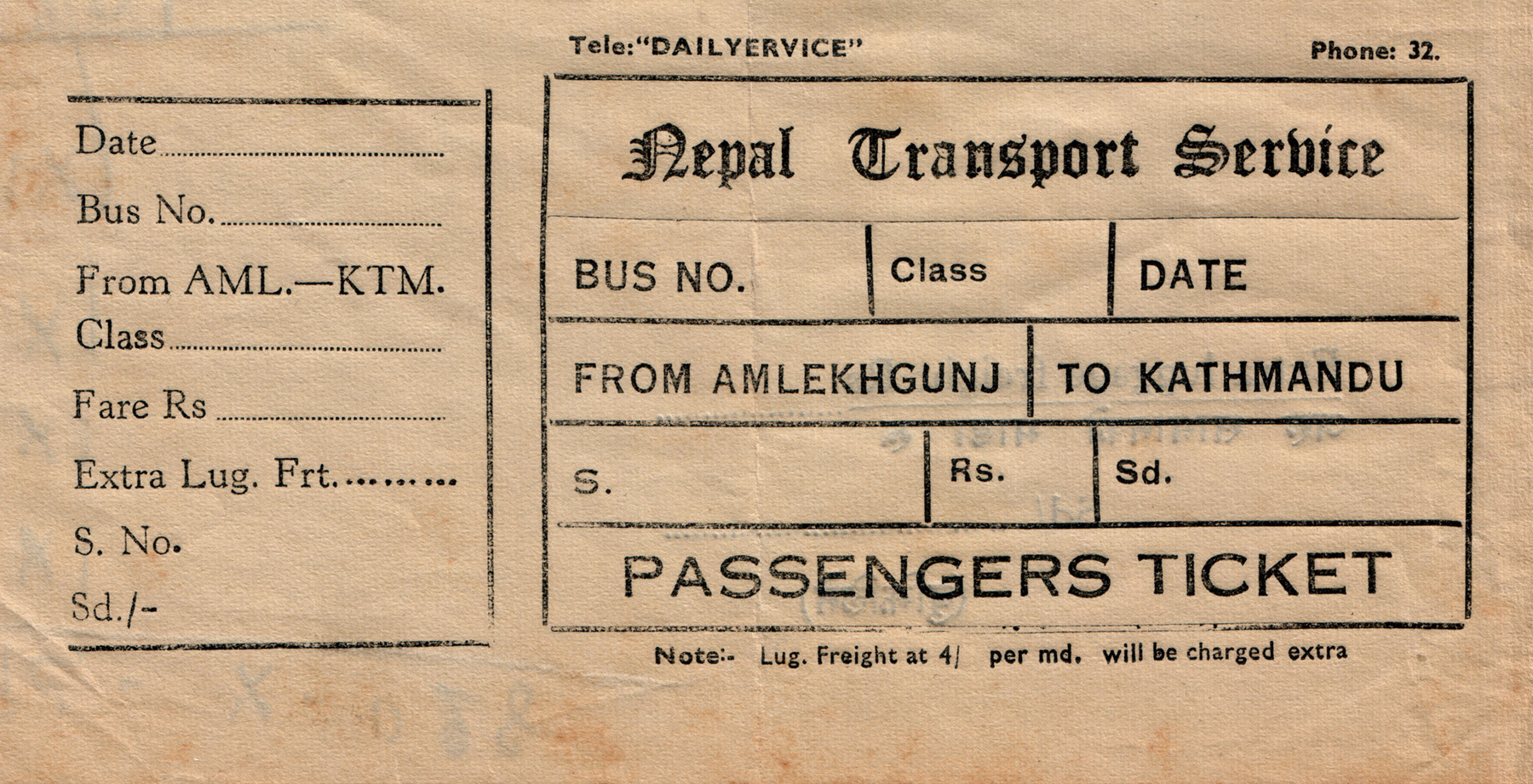
Kathmandu-Amlekhgunj bus ticket

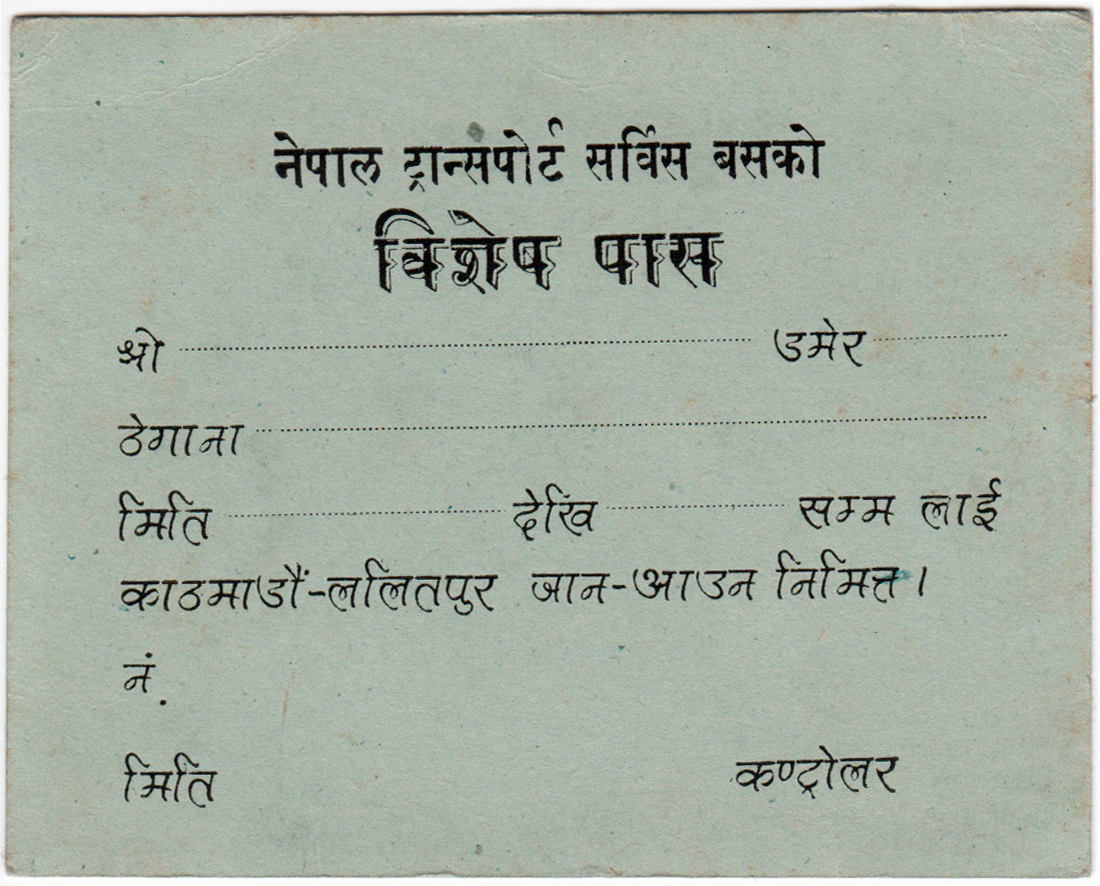
Bus pass
