= Shrinkhala Khatiwada =

Nepalese pageant competitor (born 1995)

- Born: 3 November 1995 (age 30); Hetauda, Makwanpur District, Nepal
- Other name: Phunu
- Education: Pulchowk Campus; Harvard University
- Height: 5 ft 7.5 in (1.71 m)
- Spouse: Sambhav Sirohiya (m. December 14, 2023)
- Beauty pageant titleholder
- Title: Miss Nepal 2018
- Hair color: Black
- Eye color: Black
- Major competitions: Miss Nepal 2018; (Winner); Miss World 2018; (Top 12); (Beauty with a Purpose)

Shrinkhala Khatiwada (Nepali: शृङ्खला खतिवडा; pronounced [ˈsriŋkʰʌla ˈkʰʌt̪iwʌɽa]) is a Nepalese model and beauty pageant titleholder who won Miss Nepal World 2018. She represented Nepal in Miss World 2018. She also became the second Nepali after Ishani Shrestha to win Beauty with a Purpose Award. She was in the Top 12 of Miss World 2018.

== Early life and family background ==
Khatiwada was born on 3 November 1995 (17 Kartik 2052 BS) in Hetauda, Bagmati Province. Her father, Birodh Khatiwada, is a CPN (MC) leader who was elected as a member of central parliament from Makwanpur Constituency No. 2 in general elections of 2017 for the fourth time. Her mother, Munu Sigdel Khatiwada, was the President of CPN (UML), Makwanpur District and also a member of the state parliament of Bagmati Province. Shrinkhala has an older brother, Bimba, who lives in Australia. Shrinkhala is a National Chancellor for the International Association of Educators for World Peace (IAEWP) and President of the One Home Foundation.

== Education ==
Khatiwada completed SLC (Secondary Leaving Certificate) from Hetauda Academy, and High School from Goldengate International College (S3). She studied architecture at the Institute of Engineering, Pulchowk Campus and graduated at the top of her class. She went on to pursue a Master's in Urban Planning at the Harvard Graduate School of Design.

== Miss Nepal 2018 ==
Shrinkhala won Miss Nepal World 2018 succeeding Nikita Chandak. She was the 23rd Miss Nepal. She also won the sub-titles of 'Miss Fascino' and 'Miss Beautiful Hair' in this competition among 24 other contestants. The event was held on 11 April 2018 in Nepal's capital city, Kathmandu.

== Miss World 2018 ==
Shrinkhala competed with 118 other contestants for the title of Miss World 2018. She placed in the top 12. Miss Thailand, Nicolene Pichapa Limsnukan, eventually became Miss World Asia and Oceania.

=== World Designer Competition ===
She encountered a problem during the ramp walk for the round of World Designer competition where the train of her gown got stuck with the embroidery and kept coming through the slit in her gown.

=== Head to Head Challenge ===
She was placed in group 13 along with contestants from Luxembourg, Bosnia and Herzegovina, Guam, and Moldova for the Head to Head challenge. Shrinkhala won the first round of Head to Head challenge from group 13, however lost to Singapore in the second round.

=== Multimedia Award ===
On 3 December 2018, due to the highest number of votes among all of the contestants of Miss World, Shrinkhala was awarded Miss Multimedia Award, which placed her directly in Top 30 of Miss World 2018. The same evening, she became the second runner-up in Sanya tourism video award based on creative content, use of various editing software and displaying knowledge of Sanya.

=== Beauty With A Purpose Award ===
Following two rounds of careful deliberation; a panel of Miss World Judges, selected the project of Shrinkhala as the winner of the Beauty With A Purpose Award from among the 25 videos that were shortlisted. She expressed her happiness on her social media handles by writing "The reason why I joined Miss Nepal was for Miss World and its advocacy of Beauty with a purpose. I always said that this title meant more than the crown to me and now I feel the happiest!"

=== The Grand Finale ===
The Miss World 2018 Final was held on 8 December 2018 in Sanya, China. Shrinkhala made it to the Top 12, along with Miss Thailand 2018 - Nicolene Pichapa Limsnukan and Miss New Zealand 2018 - Jessica Tyson, in the pageant among the other participants from Asia and Oceania Category.

Awards and achievements
Preceded by Nikita Chandak	Miss Nepal World; 2018	Succeeded by Anushka Shrestha
Preceded by (Vietnam) Đỗ Mỹ Linh	Beauty with a Purpose; 2018	Succeeded by (Nepal) Anushka Shrestha
Preceded by (Mongolia) Enkhjin Tseveendash	Multimedia Winner; 2018	Succeeded by (Nepal) Anushka Shrestha
