= Manita Devkota =

Nepalese-American Model

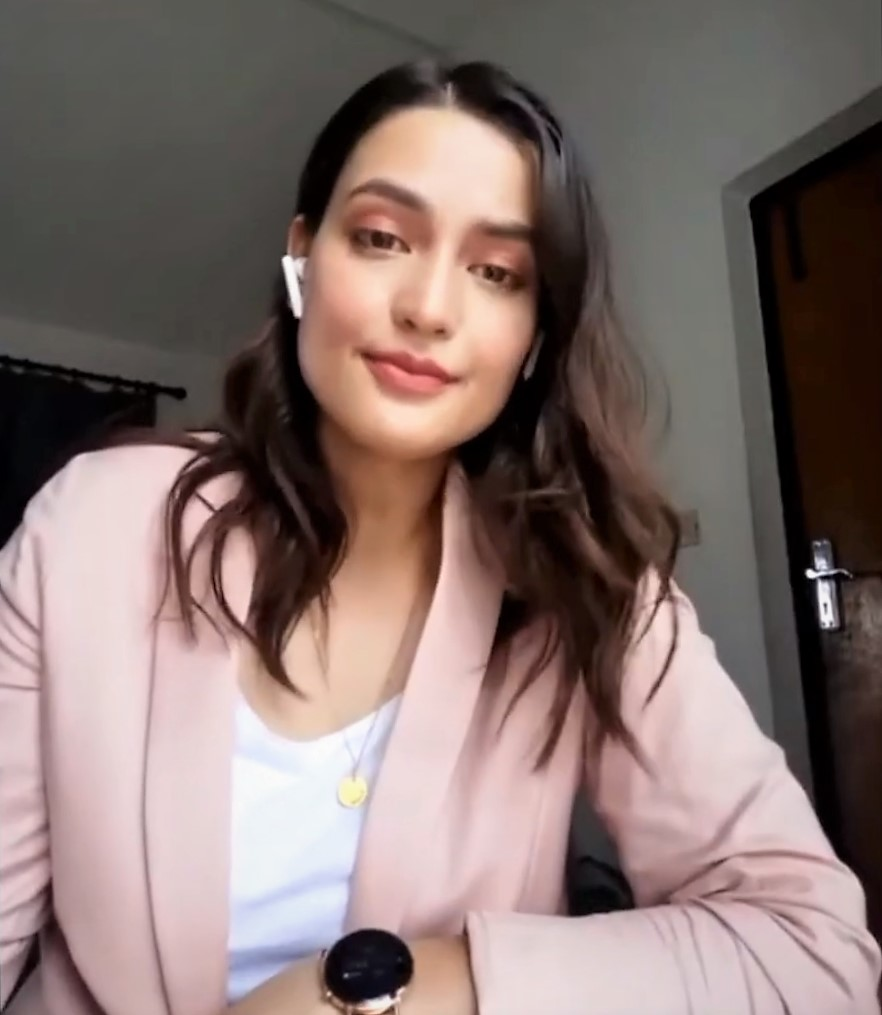
- Devkota speaks to DV Education Nepal in 2020
- Born: Manita Devkota; Khandbari, Sankhuwasabha, Nepal
- Education: East Carolina University
- Occupations: Public Health Activist, Model
- Height: 1.73 m (5 ft 8 in)
- Beauty pageant titleholder
- Title: Miss Universe Nepal 2018
- Hair color: Brown
- Major competitions: Miss Nepal 2018 (2018); Miss Universe 2018 (Top 10)

Manita Devkota (Nepali: मनिता देवकोटा) is a Nepalese-American model and beauty pageant titleholder. She was crowned Miss Universe Nepal on April 11, 2018, representing Nepal at the Miss Universe 2018 pageant and finishing as a Top 10 finalist.

She became the first Miss Nepal to win Miss Universe Nepal in an ongoing competition as the organizer of Miss Nepal, The Hidden Treasure, adjoining the title for the first time in the competition.

== Career ==
Nepal debuted in Miss Universe pageantry in 2017.

She was crowned Miss Universe Nepal on April 11, 2018. On December 17, 2018, Devkota participated in Miss Universe 2018. In the second year of participation, Devkota made it to the top 10. She was the first Miss Nepal to reach the semi-final stage of Miss Universe. She also won the Miss Universe National Gift Auction of 2018.

Awards and achievements
Preceded by Nagma Shrestha	Miss Universe Nepal; 2018	Succeeded by Pradeepta Adhikari
