= Jagat Lal Master =

Nepalese educator and writer (1902–1967)

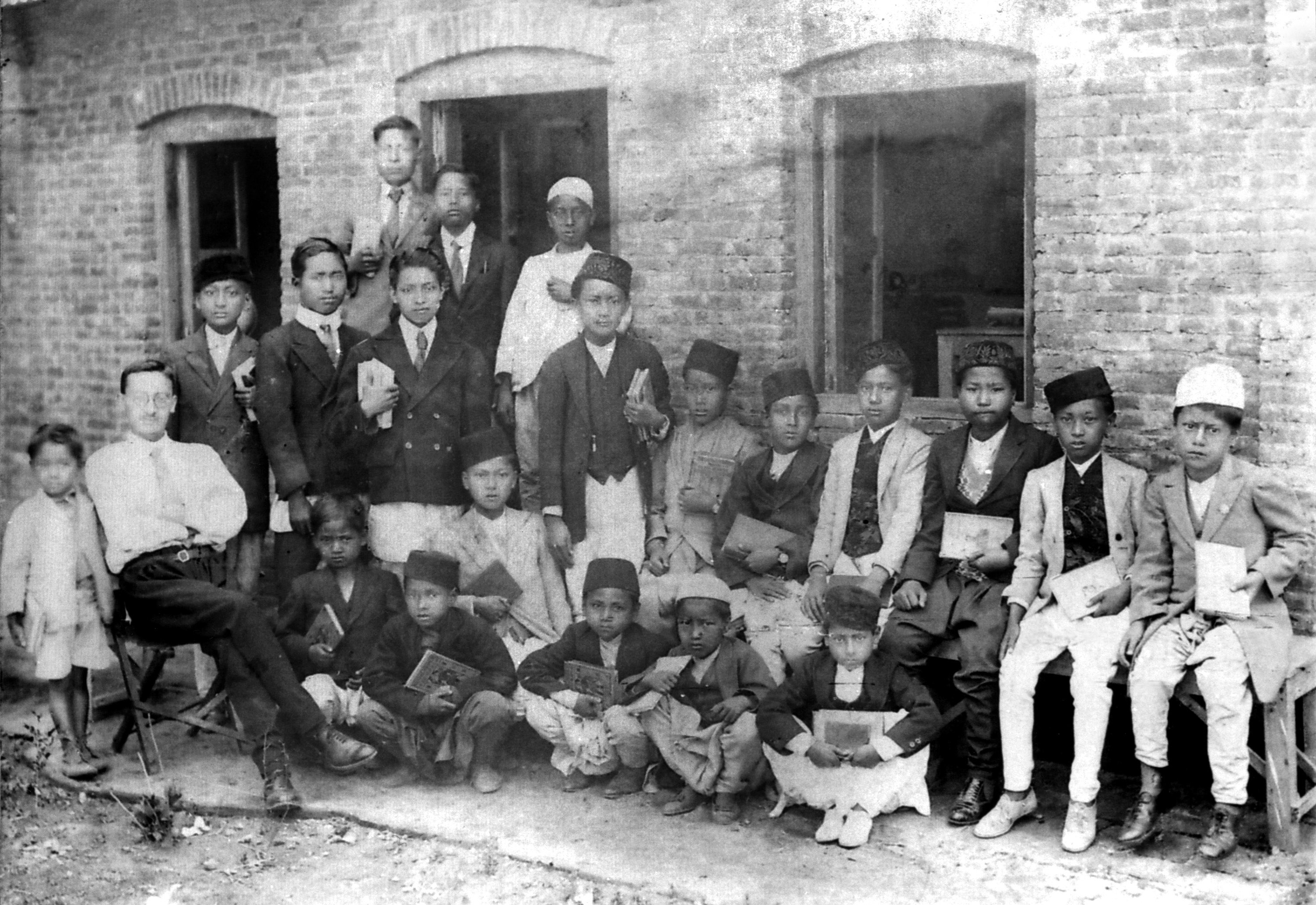
Jagat Lal Master (second from left) with his students in 1932

Jagat Lal Master (Nepali: जगतलाल मास्टर; 1902 – 19 January 1967) (alternative name: Jagat Lal Shrestha) was a Nepalese educator and writer. He advocated the teaching of English and ran a school at his home, risking state censure during the time of the autocratic Rana regime. Jagat Lal also wrote textbooks and children's stories in Nepal Bhasa.

Jagat Lal was born in Kathmandu. His father and mother were Shyam Krishna and Ratna Maya Shrestha. He was taught by the renowned educator and visionary Jagat Sundar Malla, who emphasized the teaching of English language in the mother tongue Nepal Bhasa. Jagat Lal was the father of folklorist and author Kesar Lall.

== Teacher ==
Jagat Lal ran a school at his home in Māsan Galli (मासं गल्लि) in central Kathmandu. As a teacher, people began calling him Jagat Lal Master. In the 1930s, his school was one of the few places of learning available to the public as the Rana regime did not want ordinary citizens to become educated. He taught English and other subjects to neighborhood boys.

Among his students who went on to make a name for themselves were freedom fighter and author Prem Bahadur Kansakar, transport pioneer Karuna Ratna Tuladhar, author Pushpa Ratna Sagar, industrialist Mahanta Lal Shrestha and educationist Nhuchhe Bahadur Bajracharya.

== Writer ==
Jagat Lal also wrote children's stories and poetry. He has published a number of story books, an alphabet book and a grammar book. An alphabet book in Nepal Bhasa entitled Jagat Varnamālā ("Jagat Alphabet Book") came out in 1958. Machā Bākhan ("Children's Stories") was published in 1961. He has published an English grammar in Nepal Bhasa.
