= Anushka Shrestha =

Nepalese accountant and beauty queen

The Honourable Anushka Shrestha
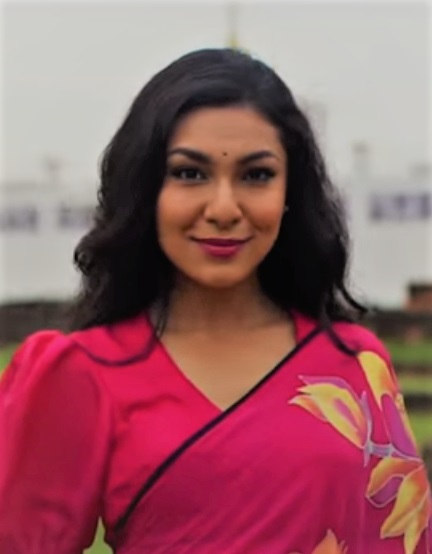
- Born: January 18, 1996 (age 30); Kathmandu, Nepal
- Education: Bachelor of Commerce
- Occupations: Founder and CEO, Makkusé
- Awards: Miss World Nepal 2019

Member of Parliament, Pratinidhi Sabha
- Incumbent
- Assumed office 27 March 2026
- Constituency: PR

Personal details
- Party: Rastriya Swatantra Party

Anushka Shrestha (Nepali: अनुष्का श्रेष्ठ) is a Nepali politician, member of parliament, entrepreneur, and beauty pageant titleholder who won Miss Nepal 2019. She is the founder and CEO of Makkusé, a Nepali desserts brand aiming to promote, preserve, and innovate Nepali dessert recipes such as gundpak and pustakari.

== Early life and education ==
Shrestha was born in Kathmandu, Nepal. She completed her S.L.C from Triyog High School and her +2 from Ace Higher Secondary School. She has a bachelor's degree in Commerce from the Australian Catholic University where she received the Executive Dean's Commendation for academic excellence and was the valedictorian of her graduating class.

== Career ==
During her Bachelor of Commerce (Accounting) at Australian Catholic University in Sydney, Shrestha undertook an internship at the Secretariat for the Economy of the Holy See in Vatican City from March to June 2016, working alongside KPMG and PWC on financial reform initiatives. After graduating, she worked with ACU in various roles, serving as an Assistant International Student Advisor and later as Finance Officer. She also worked as audit administrator at the Commonwealth Bank of Australia from June 2018 to March 2019.

After returning to Nepal, she worked as the regional manager for her alma mater from 2020 to January 2026. In this role, she led pilot programs to strengthen academic relationships between Australia and Nepal such as study tours for Australian nursing students in Nepali hospitals.

In 2020, Shrestha co-founded Makkusé, a Nepali artisan dessert brand promoting traditional sweets like Gundpak and Pustakari globally.

== Pageantry ==
=== Miss Nepal Oceania 2018 ===
In 2018, Shrestha competed in and won Miss Nepal Oceania 2019, held in Australia.

=== Miss Nepal 2019 ===
Shrestha won Miss Nepal 2019 on 9 May 2019, at the Laboratory H.S. premises, Kirtipur, Nepal. She competed against twenty-four others, and was crowned by Shrinkhala Khatiwada, Miss Nepal 2018. Shrestha also won the Miss Intellectual and Miss Fascino awards.

=== Miss World 2019 ===
After Shrestha was given the title of Miss World Nepal 2019, she went on to represent Nepal at Miss World 2019 at ExCeL London, United Kingdom on 14 December 2019, where she reached the top 12. She also won the Beauty With a Purpose and Multimedia awards along with the Head-to-Head Challenge subtitle.

== Political career ==
Shrestha joined the Rastriya Swatantra Party (RSP), a centrist political party in Nepal.

In the 2026 Nepalese general election held on 5 March 2026, Shrestha was elected to the House of Representatives as a Member of Parliament under the proportional representation system, representing the Indigenous Janajati women's cluster. Her parliamentary focus areas include promoting Nepali products in international markets, meaningful indigenous representation, women's rights and empowerment, and education.

== Accolades ==
- Miss Nepal Oceania 2018
- Miss Intellectual — Miss Nepal 2019
- Miss Fascino — Miss Nepal 2019
- Miss Nepal World 2019
- Beauty with a Purpose Award — Miss World 2019
- Multimedia Award — Miss World 2019
- Head-to-Head Challenge Winner — Miss World 2019
- Ranked 3rd, Top 10 Women Entrepreneurs in South Asia — The InCap Magazine, 2022
- Emerging Woman Entrepreneur of the Year, Bagmati Province — Standard Chartered NewBiz Business Women Summit & Awards, 2023
- Saksham Naari Samman — 2023
- Glocal Skill Hero Award — Entrepreneurship category 2026

Awards and achievements
Preceded by Shrinkhala Khatiwada	Miss Nepal World; 2019	Succeeded by Namrata Shrestha
Preceded by (Nepal) Shrinkhala Khatiwada	Beauty with a Purpose; 2019	Succeeded by (Kenya) Sharon Obara
Preceded by (Nepal) Shrinkhala Khatiwada	Multimedia Winner; 2019	Succeeded by (Ivory Coast) Olivia Yacé
