= Kathmandu College of Management =

Nepalese higher education

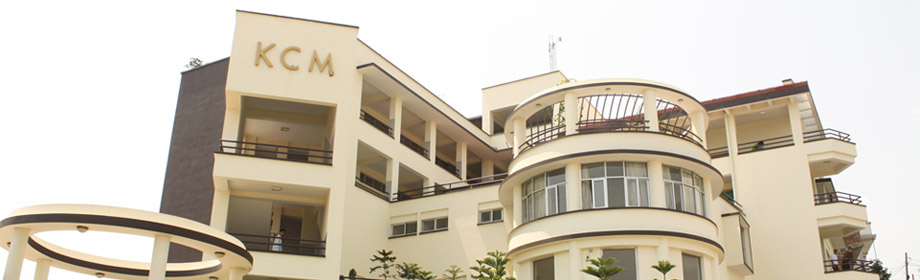
- Type: Private
- Established: 1997
- Founder: Bishnu Raj Adhikari
- Affiliations: Siam University
- Location: Gwarko, Lalitpur, Nepal
- Website: www.kcm.edu.np

KCM is a management and technology higher-education institution in Nepal, established in 1997. The college offers three bachelor’s programs in management and information technology in partnership with Siam University, Thailand. These include the Bachelor of Business Administration (BBA), with specializations in Finance & Investment and Marketing, the Bachelor of Science (BSc) in Information Technology, and the BSc in Computer and Data Science . The admission period runs annually from May through August.

KCM is the first management college to introduce BBA program in Nepal. Over the years, it has also been recognized multiple times as the Nepal’s best business school for undergraduate studies.

== History of KCM ==
KCM is a college of higher education established in 1997 by Mr Bishnu Raj Adhikari, who continues to serve as the college Principal. It was the first management college in Nepal to offer a BBA program in affiliation with Kathmandu University. The college later expanded its academic offerings to include the Bachelor of Business Information Systems (BBIS) program under the same affiliation.

In 2014, KCM began offering the BBA program in partnership with Siam University, Thailand. Building on this partnership, the college further diversified its portfolio in 2026 by introducing Bachelor of Science (BSc) programs in information technology and computer & data science under the same affiliation.

KCM has partnerships with, for instance, Pearson VUE, ETS, and CAIA Association. In the past, KCM had partnered with global organizations such as Cisco, Microsoft, and Sun Microsystems to offer industry-relevant professional certification programs.

== Programs Offered ==
KCM currently offers three undergraduate programs in management and information technology:

- BBA (Specialization in Finance & Investment, and Marketing)
- BSc Computer and Data Science
- BSc Information Technology

These four-year bachelor’s programs are delivered under a semester system. Students complete the first three years of study in Nepal, undertake their seventh semester at Siam University, Thailand, and conclude with a global internship in the eighth semester.

In addition, the college offers a BBA Articulation Program in partnership with Macquarie University, Australia, providing students with additional international academic pathways.

KCM also facilitates student exchange opportunities, enabling BBA students to spend a semester at partner institutions such as ESC Rennes School of Business, France and Sookmyung Women's University, South Korea.

== Notable alumni ==
- Nirajan Shah (Late Prince of Nepal)
- Bartika Eam Rai (Singer/ Songwriter/ Poet)
- Sajjan Raj Vaidya (Singer/ Songwriter/ Guitarist/Composer)
- Nirvana Chaudhary (Managing Director of CG)
- Srijana Regmi (Singer/Songwriter/Model/Actress)
- Ananta Poudyal (Board of Director, Nabil Bank)
- Karvika Thapa (CEO, Kimbu Tech)
- Prarthana Saakha (Co-Founder, TIGG)
- Alish Shrestha (Co-Founder & COO, AMNIL Technologies Pvt. Ltd.)
- Bibhusan Bista (Executive President, YoungInnovations Pvt. Ltd.)
