= Ronali Amatya =

Nepalese model

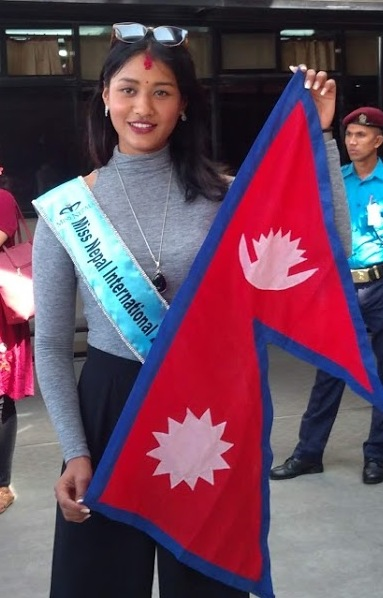
- Ronali at Tribhuvan Airport in 2018
- Born: 18 December 1995 (age 30); Kathmandu, Nepal
- Occupations: Modal; Yoga Instructor
- Height: 1.70 m (5 ft 7 in)
- Beauty pageant titleholder
- Title: Miss International Nepal 2018
- Hair color: Dark Brown
- Eye color: Brown
- Major competitions: Miss Nepal 2018 (Winner); Miss International 2018 (Unplaced); Miss Grand International 2021 (Unplaced)

Ronali Amatya is a Nepali model and beauty pageant title holder. She won the Miss Nepal International 2018 crown. She was born on 18 December 1995.

== Early life and education ==
Amatya was involved in sports including karate as a child.

She graduated with a bachelor's degree at the age of 20.

== Career ==
=== Modeling ===
Amatya began her modeling career after winning Model Hunt Nepal 2016, organized by The Next Models Nepal. During the competition, she won the title of "Miss Personality."

Amatya modeled in a graduation fashion show at Namuna College of Fashion Technology in 2016 and at The Mount Everest Fashion Runway in January 2020. Besides being a ramp model, she has also been a prominent face in magazines and online portals.

=== Pageantry ===
Amatya won Miss Eco International Nepal 2017. At Miss Eco International 2017 in Egypt, she received the title of "Miss Congeniality."

She represented Nepal in "Miss International 2018", held at Tokyo Dome City Hall in Tokyo, Japan. She would again represent Nepal at Miss Grand International 2021 in Thailand.

== Personal life ==
Amatya struggled with self-image issues (and subsequent mental health issues) after entering the modeling and pageant industries. She began addressing these issues in 2020 during the COVID-19 pandemic quarantine. She has also dealt with gastritis. She took up yoga in 2017.

Awards and achievements
| Preceded by Niti Shah (Nepal) | Miss Nepal International; 2018 | Succeeded by Meera Kakshapati |
