= Niti Shah =

Nepalese model (born 1996)

- निति शाह
- Niti Shah during her appointment as the brand ambassador of Nepal Telecom.
- Born: February 2, 1996 (age 30) jajarkot, Nepal
- Education: MBA Westcliff University Nepal, High school Chandbagh, Jorpati, Kathmandu Nepal
- Beauty pageant titleholder
- Title: Miss Nepal International 2017
- Hair color: Black
- Eye color: Brown
- Major competitions: Miss Nepal International 2017 (winner); Miss International 2017 (unplaced)

Niti Shah (born February 2, 1996) is a Nepali actress, model and beauty pageant titleholder who was crowned Miss International Nepal 2017. She was declared the most popular face of EnVogue and the first runner-up in Face's House of Fashion 2013. She represented Nepal at Miss International 2017 in Japan. Spouse: Yachnit Rana

Shah has also fronted the covers of TEENZ, VOW, Naari, Navyaata, along with several other fashion magazines. She has also walked on the runway for several fashion shows, including TGIF Nepal Fashion Week.

She also participated in Miss Nepal 2017.

== Filmography ==
Year	Film	Role	Notes
2013	Female in Film	Niti	Short film
2024	Khajure Bro		
2024	Jwai Saab		
2025	Mohar	Sinduri	Film
2026	Jadau		Releasing September 25, 2026

Awards and achievements
Preceded by Barsha Lekhi (Nepal)	Miss Nepal International; 2017	Succeeded by Ronali Amatya (Nepal)
