= Srijana Regmi =

Nepalese model, beauty queen and actress (born 1992)

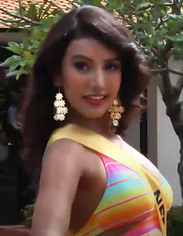
- Shrijana Regmi
- Born: 28 December 1992 (age 33); Sankhuwasabha, Nepal
- Education: Kathmandu College of Management
- Alma mater: NIST
- Occupations: singer-songwriter, actor, model
- Height: 5 ft 7 in (1.70 m)
- Beauty pageant titleholder
- Title: Miss Grand Nepal 2014
- Years active: 2012-present
- Hair color: Dark Brown
- Eye color: Brown
- Major competitions: Miss Nepal 2016 (4th place); Miss Talent
- Website: www.missnepal.com.np/participants_2016.php

Srijana Regmi (Nepali: श्रीजना रेग्मी) (born December 28, 1992) is a Nepalese singer-songwriter, model, and actress. She was a top-five finalist at the Miss Nepal 2016 beauty pageant and represented Nepal at the Miss Grand International 2014.

Srijana graduated in business studies from the Kathmandu College of Management.

== Career ==
Srijana started her modeling career at the age of 20, when she first competed in The Joy Papaya Glam Hunt, where she won the main title. She was then chosen to represent Nepal at Miss Grand International 2014 in Sukhothai, Thailand.

Srijana walked at the Nepal Fashion Week from 2014 to 2016 and has appeared in Nepalese fashion magazines Wave, Nari, Navyata, TNM Magazine, and Movers & Shakers Nepal, etc.

Srijana participated in the Miss Nepal 2016 competition as contestant number 16, and she won the sub title of Miss Talent and placed fourth overall in the contest.

=== Music ===
As of October 2023, three songs from her debut album "Dreams Under A Rhododendron Tree" have been released through her YouTube channel and as singles through her Spotify. The first song is titled 'Murder Mountain', the second song from her album is titled 'Floods in Spring' and the third song is titled "Mindless Missionaries"

Awards and achievements
Preceded by Ashmita Sitoula (Nepal)	Miss Grand Nepal; 2014	Succeeded by Jenita Basnet
