= Barsha Lekhi =

Miss Nepal 2016

- Born: Barsha Lekhi; 5 May 1993 (age 33); Gangajali, Saptari District, Nepal
- Education: Environmental science
- Alma mater: Patan Multiple Campus; Kendriya Vidyalaya, Embassy of India, Kathmandu
- Occupation: Environment activist
- Height: 1.68 m (5 ft 6 in)
- Beauty pageant titleholder
- Title: Miss Nepal International 2016; Miss Popular
- Years active: 2016-present
- Hair color: Dark brown
- Eye color: Brown
- Major competitions: Miss Nepal 2016; Miss International 2016

Barsha Lekhi (Nepali: बर्षा लेखी, born 5 May 1993) is a Nepalese beauty pageant titleholder. She was crowned Miss Nepal 2016, won the Missiology People's Choice award in 2016, and represented Nepal at the Miss International contest held in Japan on October 27, 2016. Lekhi completed her environmental science education at Patan Multiple Campus and has worked at the NEFIN-REDD/CC Partnership Program. She pursued a Master's Degree in environmental science at Jawaharlal Nehru University.

== Career ==
Lekhi entered the Miss Nepal 2016 pageant as competitor number 14 and was crowned Miss Nepal International 2016. She also earned the Miss Popular title.

=== Miss Nepal 2016 ===
Lekhi is the first Miss Nepal from the indigenous Tharu community.

=== Miss International 2016 ===
Barsha Lekhi competed in the Miss International 2016 pageant held on October 27, 2016, in Tokyo Dome City Hall, Tokyo, Japan.

Awards and achievements
Preceded by Medha Koirala (Nepal)	Miss Nepal International; 2016	Succeeded by Niti Shah
