= Asmi Shrestha =

Miss Nepal 2016

- अस्मी श्रेष्ठ
- Born: 30 June 1993 (age 33); Tandi, Chitwan
- Education: Bachelor of Business Administration
- Alma mater: Ace Institute of Management
- Occupation: Model
- Height: 1.75 m (5 ft 9 in)
- Beauty pageant titleholder
- Title: Miss Nepal 2016
- Major competition: Miss Nepal

Asmi Shrestha (born 30 June 1993) is a Nepali model and beauty pageant titleholder who won the 2016 Miss Nepal pageant. She represented Nepal at the Miss World 2016 competition.

== Early life ==
Shrestha was born on 30 June 1993 in Tandi, Chitwan, Nepal. She obtained a Bachelor of Business Administration from Ace Institute of Management, Kathmandu, in 2016.

== Career ==
In 2010, Shrestha started her modelling career at age 16 for Classic Diamond Jewelers. In 2012, she was featured in Sonam Tashi Gurung's music video for Birsana Sakinna.

In 2014, she competed in the Face of Diamond competition by Classic Diamond Jewelers, where she won the main title.

Shrestha participated in the Miss Nepal 2016 competition as contestant number 11. She won the titles for Best Evening Gown, Miss Photogenic and Miss Personality, before taking the main title of Miss Nepal 2016.

Shrestha made the top 5 in the Beauty with a Purpose category at Miss World 2016.

== Music videos ==
As of May 2022, Asmi Shrestha has appeared in three music videos:

S.No	Song	Artist	Release date
1	Birsana Sakina	Sonam Tashi Gurung	27 September 2012
2	Chiso Chiso Hawa Ma (Cover)	Sonam Tashi Gurung	19 October 2014
3	LAIJAU MALAI	Abhaya and The Steam Engines with DJ Bidhan & Zanrix Ft. Dilli Phombo	12 January 2022

Awards and achievements
Preceded by Evana Manandhar	Miss Nepal World; 2016	Succeeded by Nikita Chandak
