= Nagma Shrestha =

Nepalese beauty pageant titleholder

- नग्मा श्रेष्ठ
- Born: 10 November 1991 (age 34); Kathmandu, Nepal
- Occupations: Model; Television Presenter; Producer; Beauty Pageant Titleholder
- Known for: Miss Universe 2017 (entrant); Miss Earth 2012 (Top 8); VJ at Image TV; UN representative at IAYSP.
- Notable work: Miss Universe Nepal (Director, 2020-2023)
- Height: 5 ft 11 in (180 cm)
- Title: Major Titles: Miss Universe Nepal 2017; Miss Nepal Earth 2012

Nagma Shrestha (Nepali: नग्मा श्रेष्ठ) (born 10 November 1991) is a Nepalese beauty pageant titleholder, television presenter and the first Miss Universe Nepal, crowned in 2017.

== Life and career ==
Shrestha was born on 10 November 1991. She completed her secondary education from United Academy Nepal and graduated in Bachelors of Business Administration from Times Business School, Nepal in 2014. She obtained her leadership major from Cornell University. She had participated in Miss Nepal 2012, where she won Miss Earth Nepal 2012 title and in 2017, Miss Nepal Organization crowned her as Miss Universe Nepal 2017. In 2020, she got associated with Miss Universe Nepal organization as the National Director and served her tenure till 2023.

A prominent figure in Nepalese media industry, she had hosted the Image Mega Model 2015, Music of Your Choice (MOYC) on Image Channel. She had briefly appeared on the Opening Intro Video of Image Channel in 2013. As of 2024, she has been working with International Association of Youth and Students for Peace (IAYSP). She is IAYSP's United Nations representative.

== Pageantry ==
Shrestha has participated in the following of pageants.

Year	National Title	International Pageant	Achievements
2012	Miss Earth Nepal	Miss Earth 2012	Top 8
2016	World Miss University Nepal	World Miss University 2016	3rd Runner-Up Miss Fitness and Peace Corps Member
2016	Miss Eco Nepal	Miss Eco International 2016	Best Tourism Video
2017	Miss Universe Nepal	Miss Universe 2017	First Nepalese delegate at Miss Universe

== Media appearance ==
Show	Appeared As	Channel	Reference
Music of Your Choice	Host	Image Channel	
Image Mega Model	Host	Image Channel	
SMS and More	VJ	Image Channel	
Chiya Guff	Guest	Prime Times HD	
Ramailo with Utsav Season 2	Guest	Ramailo Chha TV	
Samsung Besties	Guest	Samaya TV	
The Evening Show at SIX	Guest	Himalaya TV	
Rainbow Talk	Guest	Prime Times HD	
Millennials of Nepal	Guest	Generations of Nepal	

Awards and achievements
Preceded by None	Miss Universe Nepal; 2017	Succeeded by Manita Devkota

Awards and achievements
Preceded by Anupama Aura Gurung	Miss Earth Nepal; 2012	Succeeded by Rojisha Shahi
