= Nikita Chandak =

Nepalese beauty contestant

Nikita Chandak Maheshwari
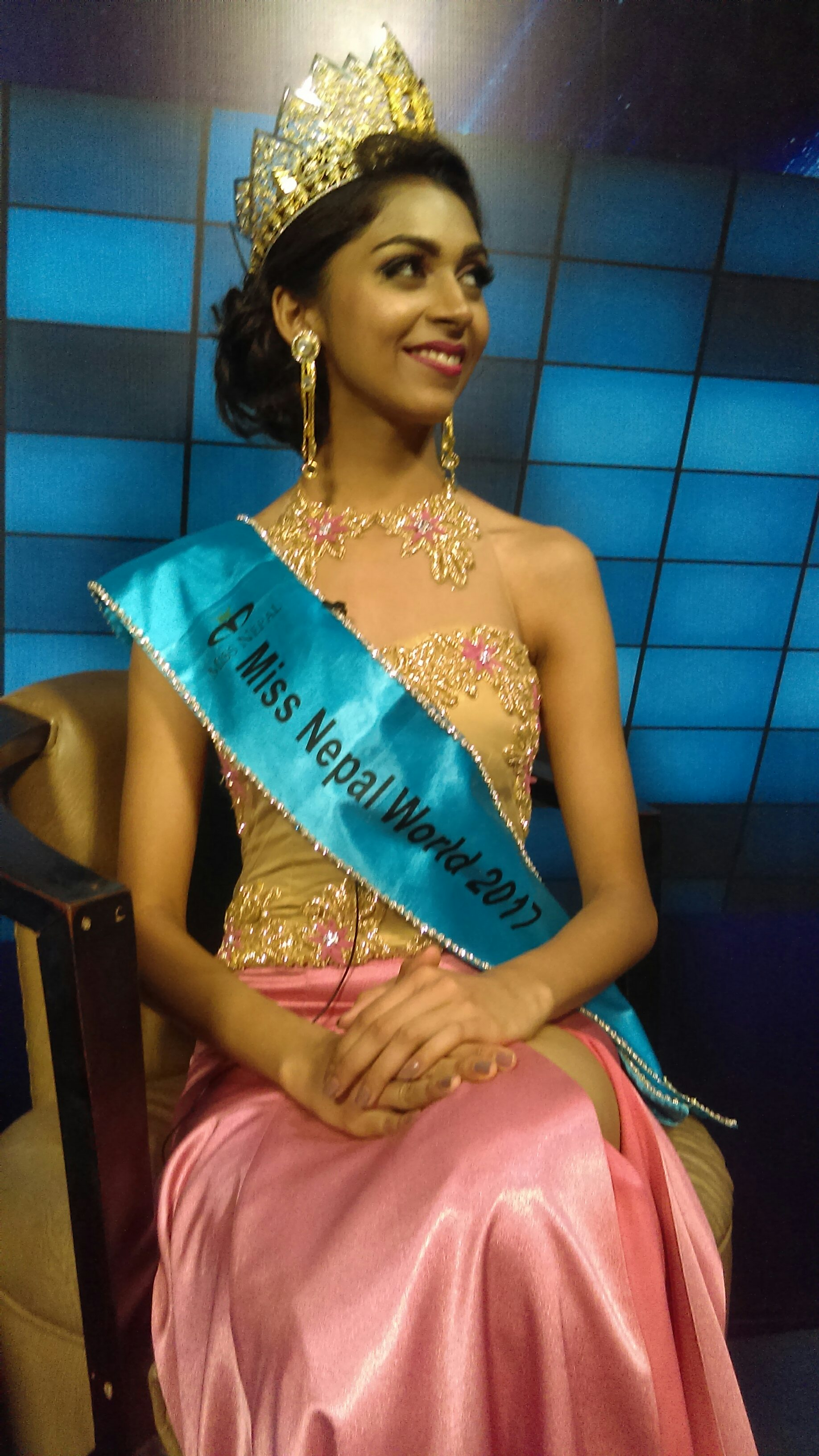
- Miss Nepal 2017
- Born: September 5, 1995 (age 31); Urlabari, Morang District, Nepal
- Height: 1.68 m (5 ft 6 in)
- Beauty pageant titleholder
- Title: Miss Nepal 2017
- Hair color: Dark Brown
- Eye color: Brown
- Major competitions: Miss Nepal 2017; (Winner); Miss World 2017; (Top 40)

Nikita Chandak (born September 5, 1995) (Nepali: निकिता चन्दक) is a Nepali model, actress, and beauty pageant titleholder who won the title of Miss Nepal 2017. She also won the Miss Popular Choice and Miss Confident titles. She represented Nepal at Miss World 2017, held in Sanya City Arena, Sanya, China. Chandak ventured into acting by playing the lead role in the 2020 film, Sanglo.

== Early life and education ==
Born to a Nepalese father of Marwari ethnicity and an Indian mother of Rajasthani origin, Chandak studied fashion communication at the JD Institute of Fashion Technology, India, in Bengaluru.

== Career ==
=== Pageantry ===
Chandak won her first title at the age of 20, when she was crowned as Miss Nepal 2017. She was the first Miss Nepal to place in the Top 30 of the Model competition. Chandak was the 2nd runner-up for the Multimedia Award and was in the top 10 to receive the People's Choice Award. She placed in the top 20 with her Beauty with a Purpose project. She won the head-to-head challenge from Group 3 which helped her get to the top 40 in the pageant.

=== Acting ===
Chandak started her acting career by starring in the Nepali movie Sanglo alongside Biraj Bhatta (who also directed the film). The 2019 Nepali movie Sanglo grossed over 8 crore rupees ($1,230,000) at the box office. This was a blockbuster success for the movie, which had a budget of 2 crore rupees ($305,000). The movie was released on February 7, 2020.Since 2023 Nikita has been actively thriving her acting career in Mumbai, India . She has done many Indian commercials and short films as well.

Awards and achievements
| Preceded by Asmi Shrestha (Nepal) | Miss Nepal World; 2017 | Succeeded by Shrinkhala Khatiwada |
