= Miss Nepal 2016 =

- Date: April 8, 2016
- Venue: Hotel Annapurna, Kathmandu, Nepal
- Broadcaster: NTV & NTV PLUS, M&S VMagazine
- Entrants: 19
- Winner: Asmi Shrestha; Chitwan

Hidden Treasures Fanta Miss Nepal 2016, the 21st annual Miss Nepal beauty pageant, was held on 8 April 2016 at Hotel Annapurna in Kathmandu. Miss Nepal 2015 Evana Manandhar crowned her successor Asmi Shrestha as Miss Nepal World 2016 to represent Nepal in the Miss World 2016.

At the same event, Roshni Khatri was crowned as Miss Earth Nepal 2016 and Barsha Lekhi was crowned as Miss International Nepal 2016.

The winner of Miss Nepal 2016 served as the brand ambassador of popular drink Fanta and WWF Nepal for a one year. In addition, she received Rs. 100,000 as prize for winning the title. The auditions of Miss Nepal were held in Biratnagar, Birgunj, Chitwan, Nepalgunj, Pokhara, Butwal and Kathmandu.

NTV and NTV PLUS broadcast the pageant live and for all the Nepalese abroad Miss Nepal 2016 was live streamed on M&S V Magazine's official website.

== Results ==
Color keys

- The contestant Won in an International pageant.
- The contestant was a Runner-up in an International pageant.
- The contestant was a Semi-Finalist in an International pageant.
- The contestant assumed another title.
- The contestant was not able to compete in an International pageant.
- The contestant did not place but won a Special Award in the pageant.
- The contestant did not place.

Final results	Contestant	International pageant	International Results
Miss Nepal 2016 (Winner)	(Nepal) Chitwan - Asmi Shrestha (●)	Miss World 2016	Unplaced; Top 5 - Beauty with a Purpose
1st runner-up (Miss Earth Nepal 2016)	(Nepal) Lalitpur - Roshni Khatri	Miss Earth 2016	Unplaced; (silver) Best in Resort Wear
2nd runner-up (Miss International Nepal 2016)	(Nepal) Saptari - Barsha Lekhi	Miss International 2016	Unplaced; People's Choice Award by Missosology
Top 5	Kathmandu – Namrata Shrestha		
Top 5	(Nepal) Sankhuwasabha - Srijana Regmi		
Top 11	(Nepal) Lalitpur - Anshu KC	Miss Asia Pacific International 2016	Unplaced
Top 11	(Nepal) Dharan – Sandipa Limbu		
Top 11	Kathmandu – Prerana Adhikari		
Top 11	Kathmandu – Soniya Sharma		
Top 11	(Nepal) Kirtipur – Ashma KC		
Top 11	(Nepal) Taplejung – Aayushma Shrestha (●)		

(●): The candidates won the Miss Popular Choice Award (online voting) and got direct entry into Top 11 semi-Finalists.

=== Sub-titles ===
Award	Contestant
Best in Evening Gown (performance)	(Nepal) Chitwan – Asmi Shrestha
Best in Evening Gown (design)	(Nepal) Chitwan – Asmi Shrestha (designer - Antee Gurung)
The Kathmandu Post Miss Intellect	(Nepal) Chitwan - Asmi Shrestha
Fanta Miss Bubbly	(Nepal) Taplejung – Aayushma Shrestha
Berger Miss Talent	(Nepal) Sankhuwasabha - Srijana Regmi
Shree Ganapati Jewellers Miss Photogenic	(Nepal) Chitwan - Asmi Shrestha
Alfa Beta Miss Scholar of the Year	Kathmandu - Prerana Adhikari
Miss Popular	(Nepal) Saptari - Barsha Lekhi
Miss Personality	(Nepal) Lalitpur - Roshni Khatri
Miss Friendship	(Nepal) Lalitpur - Anshu KC
Miss Fascino	(Nepal) Kirtipur - Ashma KC
Miss Confident	(Nepal) Lalitpur - Roshni Khatri
Beauty with a Purpose	(Nepal) Pokhara - Prativa Dawadi
Miss Best Complexion	Kathmandu - Prerana Adhikari
Miss Athletic	(Nepal) Kirtipur - Ashma KC

== Contestants ==
Province No. 1 & Province No. 2
#	Contestants	Age	Height	Representing	District	Placement
6	Aayushma Shrestha	19	1.66 m (5 ft 5 in)	Taplejung	Taplejung District	Top 11; Miss Bubbly
13	Anita Karki	21	1.69 m (5 ft 7 in)	Solukhumbu	Solukhumbu District	
14	Barsha Lekhi	21	1.74 m (5 ft 9 in)	Saptari	Saptari District	2nd Runner Up; Miss Popular
15	Sandipa Limbu	21	1.78 m (5 ft 10 in)	Dharan	Sunsari District	Top 11
16	Srijana Regmi	23	1.73 m (5 ft 8 in)	Sankhuwasabha	Sankhuwasabha District	Top 5 Miss Talent

Bagmati Province
#	Contestants	Age	Height	Representing	District	Placement
1	Ashma KC	21	1.74 m (5 ft 9 in)	Kirtipur	Kathmandu District	Top 11; Miss Athletic; Miss Fascino
2	Kritima Rimal	19	1.70 m (5 ft 7 in)	Ramkot	Kathmandu District	
3	Sajum Katuwal	20	1.70 m (5 ft 7 in)	Kirtipur	Kathmandu District	
4	Sachina Shrestha	19	1.69 m (5 ft 7 in)	Dolakha	Dolakha District	
5	Jubi Joshi	21	1.73 m (5 ft 8 in)	Kuleshwor	Kathmandu District	
7	Roshni Khatri	19	1.79 m (5 ft 10 in)	Bungamati	Lalitpur District	1st Runner Up; Miss Confident; Miss Personality
8	Soniya Sharma	22	1.76 m (5 ft 9 in)	Swayambhunath	Kathmandu District	Top 11
9	Anshu KC	23	1.81 m (5 ft 11 in)	Jharuwarasi	Lalitpur District	Top 11; Miss Friendship
11	Asmi Shrestha	22	1.75 m (5 ft 9 in)	Chitwan	Chitwan District	Winner; Miss Photogenic; Best Evening Gown; Miss Intellect
18	Namrata Shrestha	19	1.69 m (5 ft 7 in)	Kathmandu	Kathmandu District	Top 5
19	Prerana Adhikari	19	1.67 m (5 ft 6 in)	Daanchhi	Kathmandu District	Top 11; Miss Best Complexion; Miss Intellect

Gandaki Province & Lumbini Province
#	Contestants	Age	Height	Representing	District	Placement
10	Kushum Thapa Magar	19	1.71 m (5 ft 7 in)	Butwal	Rupandehi District	
12	Karuna Khadka	19	1.69 m (5 ft 7 in)	Butwal	Rupandehi District	
17	Prativa Dawadi	21	1.72 m (5 ft 8 in)	Pokhara	Kaski District	Beauty with a Purpose

== Previous Experience ==
- (#1) Asmi Shrestha was the winner of Face of Classic Diamond 2014.
- (#2) Paramita Rana was the 1st runner up in Face of Classic Diamond 2014.
- (#3) Anjana Das was the winner of Miss Pokhara Queen 2015 title.
- (#4) Priyanka Shrestha was the winner of Miss Purwanchal 2015 which gave her a direct entry to Miss Nepal 2016's Top 19 finalists.
- (#5) Priyashi Thapa was Miss Nepalgunj 2015 title holder.
- (#6) Pooja Shrestha was 1st runner up at Miss Chitwan 2014 pageant.
- (#7) Anu Rai was 1st runner up at Miss Purwanchal 2015.
- (#8) Sheelpa Maskey was an actress and singer in the UK before coming to compete in Miss Nepal 2016.
- (#9) Sabina Rana Bhujel won the title of Miss Pokhara 2015 which gave her a wild card entry to Miss Nepal 2016's Top 19 finalists.
- (#10) Mangeeta Khannal was the 1st runner up at Miss Pokhara 2015 pageant.
- (#11) Pramisha Bajracharya is 2nd runner up at Miss Purwanchal 2015.
- (#13) Zenisha Tamang was placed 8th at Mega Model Season 3.
- (#14) Samragyee Shah is the 2nd runner up at Face of Classic Diamond 2014.
- (#15) Nitika Sarah Karmacharya has previous won the title of Miss ECollege 2015.
- (#16) Varsha Rai was the 2nd runner up at Miss Purwanchal 2013.
- (#17) Aastha Pokharel is the winner of Kingfisher Calendar Super Model Season 2 and placed 5th at Asia's Next Top Model Cycle 1.
- (#18) Sitoshna Ban was the winner of Miss Chitwan 2014 and previously she competed in Miss Nepal 2014.
- (#19) Lochan Basel is the 2nd runner up at Miss Pokhara 2015.
