= Pushpa Sundar Tuladhar =

Nepalese merchant and Buddhist philanthropist

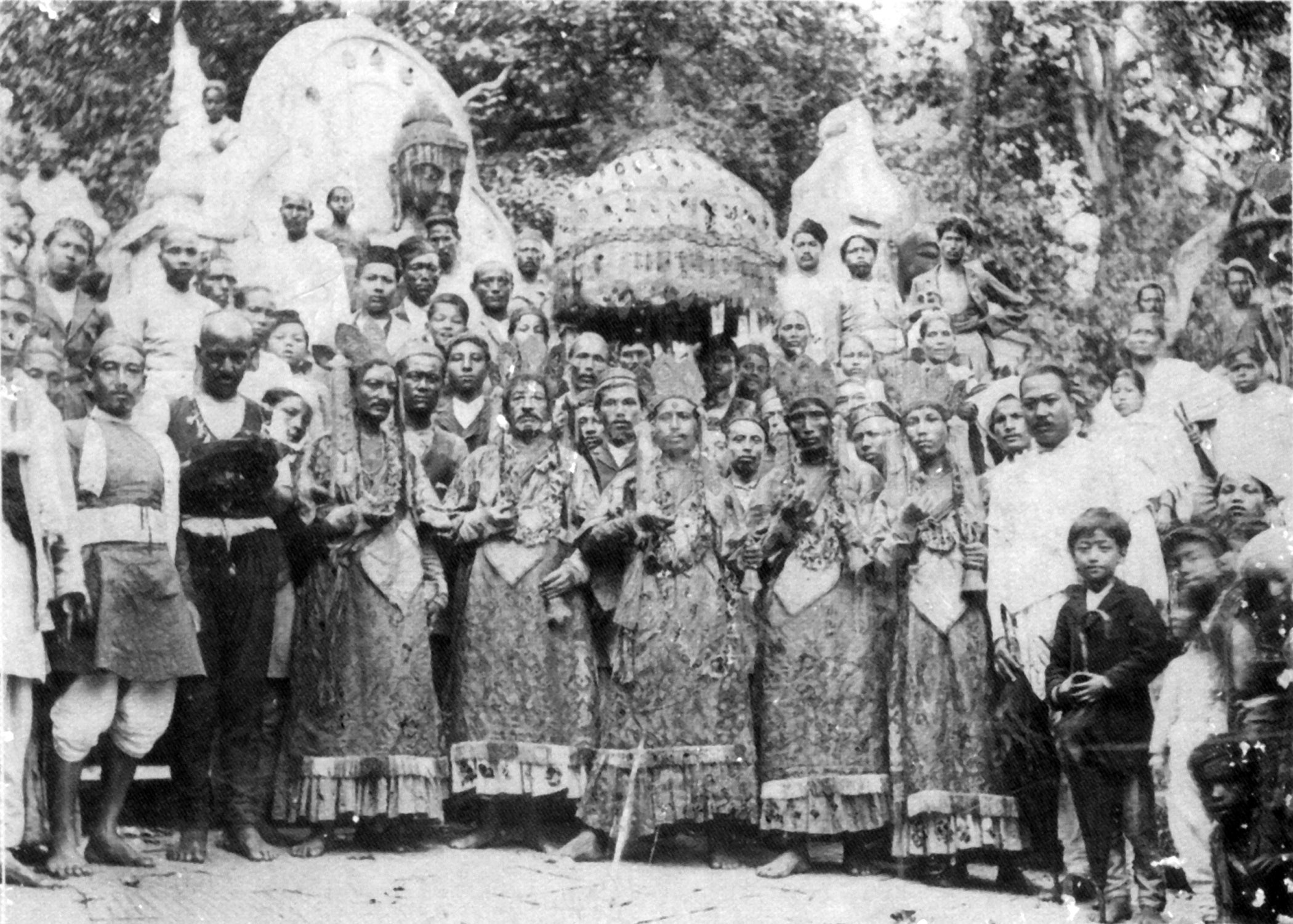
Pushpa Sundar Tuladhar (front row, extreme right, in white shirt) with five Newar priests wearing costumes representing Pancha Buddha at Swayambhu, Kathmandu in 1921.

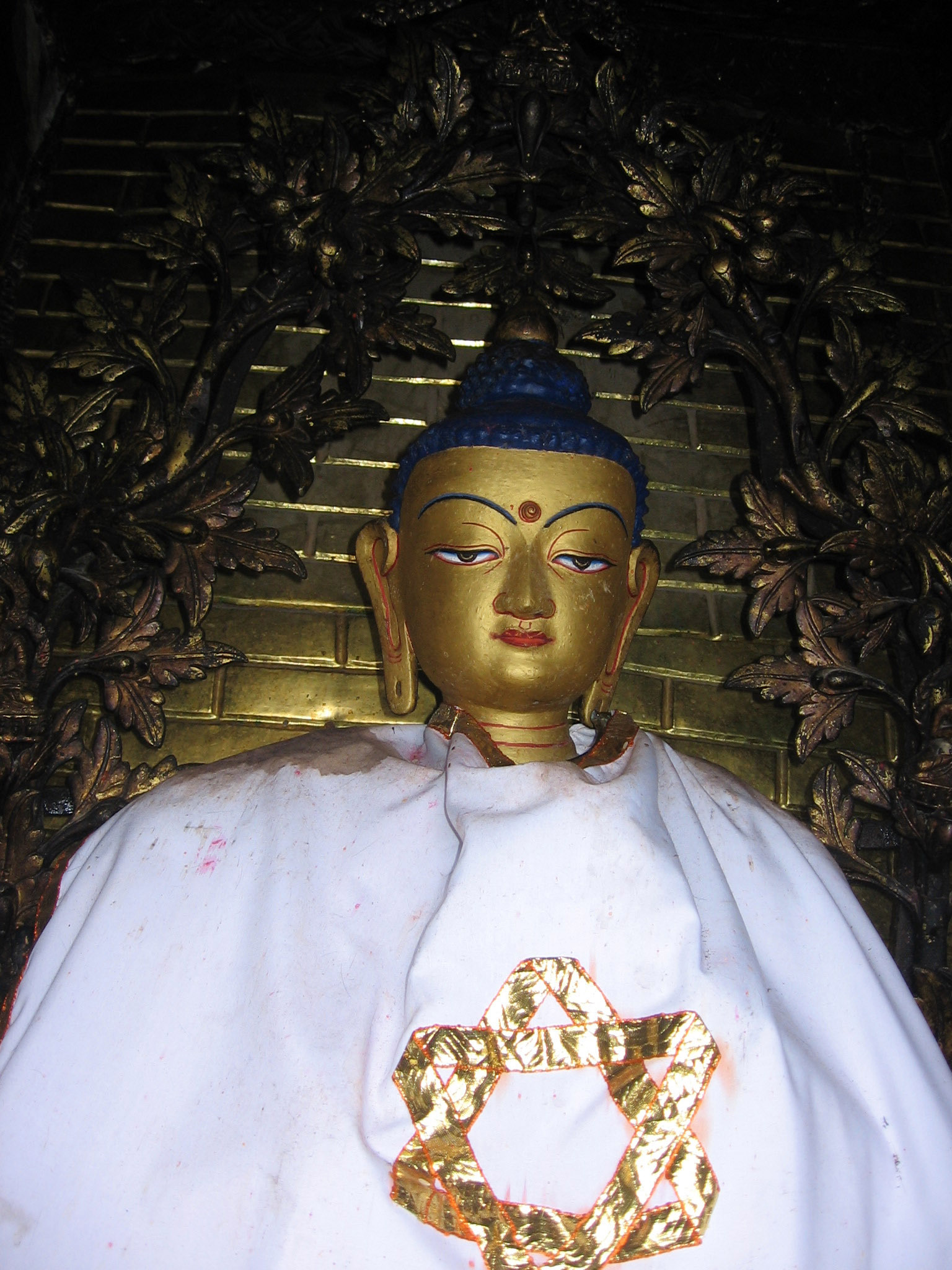
Gilded statue of Vairocana Buddha donated by Pushpa Sundar Tuladhar installed in a shrine on the east side of Swayambhu Stupa, Kathmandu.

Pushpa Sundar Tuladhar (Nepali: पुष्पसुन्दर तुलाधर; 1885-1935) was a prominent merchant of Kathmandu and one of the chief donors to the restoration of the Swayambhu stupa in 1918. Swayambhu, a UNESCO World Heritage Site, is one of the holiest Buddhist shrines in Nepal and the center of Newar Buddhism. The renovation project was headed by his father-in-law Dharma Man Tuladhar and completed in 1921.

== Early life ==
Tuladhar was born at Asan Dhalasikwa in Kathmandu, the eldest among two sons and three daughters of father Shubha Sundar and mother Mohan Maya Tuladhar. The Tuladhars were hereditary merchants and owned a business house in Lhasa known as Ghorasyar. They conducted trade between Nepal, Tibet and India, transporting merchandise over the Himalaya by mule caravan. This trade route forms part of the Silk Road.

The family also maintained a business office in Kolkata, India. The firm was named Pushpa Sundar Kula Ratna and it was located at 401/1 Upper Chitpur Road. Tuladhar divided his time between Kathmandu, Lhasa and Kolkata. He married Dhan Maya Tuladhar around 1916 who bore him three sons.

== Contributions ==
Tuladhar was a devout Buddhist and made large donations to renovate Buddhist places of worship. The renovation of 1918 was the last major project done at Swayambhu until the recent one which was completed in 2010. Pushpa Sundar and his cousin brothers Harsha Sundar and Ram Sundar Tuladhar financed the improvement of the lower portion of the stupa. Under the restoration project, the five Buddha shrines set into the dome were covered with gilt copper, a new statue of Vairocana Buddha was installed on the east side, and four new shrines were built to house statues of Tara.

In 1920, the Tuladhar family funded the refurbishment of the roof of the Jana Baha Temple in Kathmandu. The lower tile roofs on three sides of the pagoda were replaced with roofs of gilt copper. The temple houses an image of Jana Baha Dyah, known in Sanskrit as Aryavalokitesvara (Sacred Avalokiteśvara), a bodhisattva who embodies compassion.

== Later years ==
Following the restoration of Swayambhu, Tuladhar went to Lhasa again in about 1925. In 1935, he came down with dropsy and decided to return home. Tuladhar died on the trade route in Tibet a few days after his caravan departed from Lhasa.

== See also ==
- Lhasa Newar (trans-Himalayan traders)
