= Miss Pokhara =

Beauty pageant in Gandaki Province, Nepal

Miss Pokhara (मिस पोखरा)
- Formation: 1995
- Type: Beauty pageant
- Headquarters: Pokhara
- Location: Pokhara Metropolitan City
- Members: Miss Nepal
- Official language: Nepali & English
- Website: Official website

Miss Pokhara (Nepali: मिस पोखरा) is a beauty pageant that began in 1995 for the women of Gandaki Province, Nepal. Miss Pokhara has been organized by Pokhara Jaycees since the start and has been a paved way to the field of a professional modeling career. Miss Pokhara winner gets direct entry to the national beauty pageant like Miss Nepal, Miss Universe Nepal, Miss Grand Nepal and Miss National Nepal.

Shristi Khadka of Kajipokhari was crowned Miss Pokhara 2024 by Sara Bajimaya on 28 October 2024, at the Pokhara City Hall. She will compete for the title of Miss Nepal 2025.

== Results summary ==
The following is a visual summary of the past results of Miss Pokhara titleholders at the national Miss Nepal pageants/competitions. The year in parentheses indicates the year of the national competition during which a placement and/or award was garnered, not the year attached to the contestant's state title.

=== Placements ===
- Winner: Nilima Gurung (Miss Nepal Asia Pacific 1997), Usha Khadgi (Miss Nepal World 2000), Anita Gurung (Miss Earth Nepal 2004), Richa Thapa Magar (Miss Earth Nepal 2009), Sonie Rajbhandari (Miss International Nepal 2014), Ambika Rana (Miss Grand Nepal 2020), Sama Parajuli (Miss Supranational Nepal 2023), Karuna Rawat (Miss International Nepal 2024), Prapti Ranabhat (Miss Nepal Asia Pacific 2025)
- 1st Runners-up: Rita Gurung (1995), Richa Thapa Magar (2009)
- 2nd Runners-up: Kripa Shrestha (1999), Jasmine Shrestha (2000), Anita Gurung (2004), Karuna Rawat (2024)
- 3rd Runners-up: Sipora Gurung (2013)
- Top 10: Binita Gurung (1996), Sunita Ranjit (1998), Rakshya Thapa (2013), Durga Gurung (2015), Puja Shrestha (2015), Dr. Arika Ranabhat (2020), Sriyansu Piya (2022), Puja Paudel (2023), Ambika Rana (2024), Anjana Pun (2024)
- Top 15: Jyotshna Chettri (2018)

=== Awards ===
- Agni Miss Fierce: Puja Paudel (2023)
- Beauty with a Purpose: Prativa Dawadi (2016)
- Face of Farmasi: Dr. Ganga Gurung (2022)
- Martini Sun Angel: Puja Paudel (2023)
- Miss Beautiful Smile: Mohini Rana (2005)
- Miss Best Dress: Sheila Rani Gurung (2003)
- Miss Best Hair: Rasmi Adhikari (2014)
- Miss BYD Miss Green Visionary: Ambika Rana (2024)
- Miss Catwalk: Rita Gurung (1995)
- Miss DHI: Anjana Pun (2024)
- Miss Friendship: Sonie Rajbhandari (2014)
- Miss Perseverance: Madina Begum (2011)
- Miss Personality: Nilima Gurung (1997), Richa Thapa Magar (2009)
- Miss Photogenic: Kripa Shrestha (1999), Mohini Rana (2005)
- Miss Popular Choice: Anjana Pun (2024)
- Miss Stylish: Sonie Rajbhandari (2014)
- Miss Talent: Anita Gurung (2004), Richa Thapa Magar (2009), Sipora Gurung (2013), Puja Shrestha (2015), Unnati Gurung (2023)

== Titleholders ==
Color key

- Declared as winner
- Ended as runner-up
- Ended as a finalist or semi-finalist

Miss Pokhara represents her city at Miss Nepal pageant. Since 1995, Miss Pokhara has been appointed to send its winner to Miss Nepal but during 2000 till 2013 there was no Miss Pokhara beauty pageant; however, one or two delegates were sent to Miss Nepal contest as the representative of Pokhara. The reigning Miss Pokhara 2024 is Shristi Khadka and she has a direct entry to Miss Nepal 2025

Year	Contestants	Nepali Name	Home Town	Placement	Notes
1995	Rita Gurung	रीता गुरुङ	Pokhara, Kaski District	1st Runner-Up	2 Special Awards: Miss Pokhara 1995; Miss Catwalk
1996	Binita Gurung	बिनिता गुरुङ	Nirmalpokhari, Kaski District	Top 10 Semi-Finalists	Miss Pokhara 1996
1997	Nilima Gurung	निलिमा गुरुङ	Pokhara, Kaski District	Miss Nepal 1997	3 Special Awards: Miss Asia Pacific 1997; Miss Pokhara 1997; Miss Personality
1998	Sunita Ranjit	सुनिता रञ्जित	Tersapatti, Kaski District	Top 10 Semi-Finalists	Miss Pokhara 1998
1999	Kripa Shrestha	कृपा श्रेष्ठ	Tersapatti, Kaski District	2nd Runner-Up	2 Special Awards: Miss Pokhara 1999; Miss Photogenic
2000	Usha Khadgi	उषा खड्गी	Birgunj, Parsa District	Miss Nepal 2000	3 Special Awards: Miss World 2000; Miss Pokhara 1999 1st Runner-Up; Miss Personality
2003	Sheila Rani Gurung	शीला रानी गुरुङ	Bajhapatan, Kaski District	Unplaced	1 Special Awards: Miss Best Dress
2004	Anita Gurung	अनिता गुरुङ	Bhalam, Kaski District	Miss Nepal Earth 2004	1 Special Awards: Miss Talent
2005	Mohini Rana	मोहिनी राणा	Syangja, Syangja District	Top 10 Semi-Finalists	2 Special Awards: Miss Beautiful Smile; Miss Photogenic
2005	Chandra Gurung	चन्द्र गुरुङ	Aarba Bijaya, Kaski District	Unplaced	
2009	Richa Thapa Magar	ऋचा थापा मगर	Syangja, Syangja District	Miss Nepal Earth 2009	4 Special Awards: Miss Teen Nepal 2003 Miss Personality; Miss Tourism Queen International 2009; Miss Personality; Miss Talent
2011	Madina Begum	मदिना बेगम	Malepatan, Kaski District	Unplaced	1 Special Awards: Miss Perseverance
2012	Dilasha GC	दिलाशा जीसी	Kahun, Kaski District	Unplaced	
2013	Sipora Gurung	सिपोरा गुरुङ	Lamachaur, Kaski District	3rd Runner-Up	1 Special Awards: Miss Talent
2013	Rakshya Thapa	रक्षा थापा	Pokhara, Kaski District	Top 10 Semi-Finalists	
2014	Sonie Rajbhandari	सोनी राजभण्डारी	Bhalam, Kaski District	Miss Nepal International 2014	2 Special Awards: Miss Friendship; Miss Stylish
2014	Rashmi Adhikari	रश्मी अधिकारी	Ghoripatan, Kaski District	Unplaced	2 Special Awards: Miss Pokhara 2013; Miss Beautiful Hair
2015	Durga Gurung	दुर्गा गुरुङ	Pokhara, Kaski District	Top 10 Semi-Finalists	Miss UK Nepal 2012
2016	Prativa Dawadi	प्रतिभा दवाडी	Bhalam, Kaski District	Unplaced	1 Special Awards: Beauty with a Purpose
2017	Gyani Maiya Baral	ग्यानी मैया बराल	Lekhnath, Kaski District	Unplaced	
2018	Mamta Joshi	ममता जोशी	Damauli, Tanahun District	Unplaced	Miss Pokhara 2017
2018	Jyostna Chhetri	ज्योतिष क्षेत्री	Pokhara, Kaski District	Top 15 Semi-Finalists	
2019	Sara Bajimaya	सारा बजिमाया	Pokhara, Kaski District	Unplaced	Miss Pokhara 2018
2020	Ambika Rana	अम्बिका राणा	Pokhara, Kaski District	Miss Grand Nepal 2020	First woman from Pokhara to compete at Miss Grand International
2020	Dr. Arika Ranabhat	डॉक्टर अरिका रानाभाट	Pokhara, Kaski District	Top 10 Semi-Finalists	Represented Pokhara City in the 1st Edition Miss Universe Nepal 2020
2022	Sriyansu Piya	श्रीयांसु पिया	Bandipur, Tanahun District	Top 10 Semi-Finalists	
2022	Dr. Ganga Gurung	डॉक्टर गंगा गुरुङ	Tanahun, Tanahun District	Unplaced	1 Special Awards: Face of Farmasi
2023	Sama Parajuli	साम पराजुली	Pokhara, Kaski District	Miss Nepal Supranational 2023	First woman from Pokhara to compete at Miss Supranational
2023	Puja Paudel	पुजा पौडेल	Pokhara, Kaski District	Top 10 Semi-Finalists	2 Special Awards: AGNI Miss Fierce; MARTINI Sun Angel
2023	Unnati Gurung	उन्नति गुरुङ	Pokhara, Kaski District	Unplaced	1 Special Awards: Miss Talent
2024	Karuna Rawat	करुणा रावत	Damauli, Tanahun District	Miss International Nepal 2024	1 Special Awards: Miss SEE Pokhara 2014 2nd Runner-Up
2024	Ambika Rana	अम्बिका राणा	Pokhara, Kaski District	Top 13 Semi-Finalists	2 Special Awards: Miss Grand Nepal 2020; Miss BYD Miss Green Visionary
2024	Anjana Pun	अञ्जना पुन	Pokhara, Kaski District	Top 13 Semi-Finalists	3 Special Awards: Miss Hong Kong Nepal 2023; Miss DHI; Miss Popular Choice
2024	Lalita Sherbuja	ललिता शेर्बुजा	Beni, Myagdi District	Unplaced	1 Special Awards: Miss SEE Pokhara 2016 1st Runner-Up
2024	Puja Baral	पुजा बराल	Pokhara, Kaski District	Unplaced	1 Special Awards: Mega Model Season 4 Winner
2025	Prapti Ranabhat	प्राप्ति रानाभाट	Pokhara, Kaski District	Miss Nepal Asia Pacific 2025	1 Special Awards: Miss Asia Pacific International 2025 Top 10
2025	Shristi Khadka	सृष्टि खड्का	Pokhara, Kaski District	TBA	1 Special Awards: Miss Pokhara 2024
2025	Ruby Poudel	सृष्टि खड्का	Pokhara, Kaski District	TBA	1 Special Awards: Miss Nepal North America 2024 1st Runner-Up
2026	Sejal Rajbhandari	सेजल राजभण्डारी	Pokhara, Kaski District	Miss Nepal Eco International 2026	1 Special Awards: Miss Eco International 2026 Top 10
2026	Sangita Paudel	संगीता पौडेल	Pokhara, Kaski District	TBA	1 Special Awards: Miss Universe Nepal 2023 Top 10

- Note: In 2014, Prinsha Shrestha who was the original 1st runner up title got dethroned from her title of Miss Nepal Earth 2014 for breaching the rules from her contract. Sonie Rajbhandari Miss Pokhara 2014, the 2nd runner up was then awarded as the new Miss Nepal Earth 2014 title.

== History ==
The pageant has been run by Pokhara Jaycees, the sister branch to Kathmandu Jaycees which runs the Miss Nepal pageant, since 1994. Rita Gurung was crowned as the first Miss Pokhara, who ended up as first runner-up in the Miss Nepal 1995 beauty pageant when Pokhara did its debut with a high placement.

Only Nilima Gurung has won the Miss Nepal crown in 1997, so far being the only Miss Pokhara to win the crown of Miss Nepal. Miss Pokhara has the second highest number of placements after Miss Kathmandu in Miss Nepal pageant and is ranked second highest among regional contests in terms of placements.

== Winners list ==
=== History of Miss Pokhara ===
Year	Miss Pokhara	1st Runner Up	2nd Runner Up	Placement in Miss Nepal	Special Awards
1995	Rita Gurung	Anju Hirachan		1st Runner Up	Miss Catwalk
1996	Binita Gurung			Top 10 Semi-Finalist	
1997	Nilima Gurung	Rajani KC	Sunita Gurung	Miss Nepal 1997	Miss Personality
1998	Sunita Ranjit	Puspa Sherchan		Top 10 Semi-Finalist	
1999	Kripa Shrestha	Usha Khadgi		2nd Runner Up	Miss Photogenic
2013	Rasmi Adhikari	Laxmi GC	Shova KC	Unplaced	Miss Best Hair
2015	Sabina Rana Bhujel	Mangeeta Khanal	Lochan Basel	Didn't Compete	Didn't Compete
2016	Sadikshya Pandey	Prashmi Thapa	Unnati Gurung	Didn't Compete	Didn't Compete
2017	Mamta Joshi	Poonam KC	Simran Gurung	Unplaced	Unplaced
2018	Sara Bajimaya	Sujita KC	Meenashi Pokhrel	Unplaced	Unplaced
2024	Shristi Khadka	Rekha Gaire	Jesika B. Ghimire	TBA	TBA

=== Miss Pokhara Overseas Participation ===
Year	Miss Pokhara	Placement in Overseas Pageant	Special Awards
2005	Purnima Gurung	Miss Hong Kong Nepal 2005	Miss Best Dress, Miss Best Skin
2010	Sheila Shraddha Limbu	Miss United Kingdom Nepal 2010 1st Runner Up	Miss Personality
2011	Neelam Gurung	Miss United Kingdom Nepal 2011 2nd Runner Up	Miss Personality
2012	Durga Gurung	Miss United Kingdom Nepal 2012	Miss Best Figure
2016	Tenisa Rana	Miss United Kingdom Nepal 2016	Miss Talent
2017	Sirjana Gurung	Miss United Kingdom Nepal 2017	Miss Catwalk
2020	Reshmi Gurung	Miss Nepal Oceania 2020 2nd Runner Up	
2023	Anjana Pun	Miss Hong Kong Nepal 2023	Miss Catwalk
2024	Ruby Poudel	Miss Nepal North America 2024 1st Runner Up	
2025	Diya Shrestha	Miss Nepal North America 2025	
2026	Deepika Sharma	Miss Nepal North America 2026	Miss Best Figure
2026	Upasana Adhikari	Miss Nepal North America 2026 Top 12	Miss Confident

== Mister Pokhara ==
Year	Contestants	Nepali Name	Home Town	Placement	Notes
2011	Dr. Ayushman Ghimire	आयुष्मान घिमिरे डा	Damauli, Tanahun District	Mr. Nepal 2011	
2011	Nirjan Thapa	निरजन थापा	Pokhara, Kaski District	Manhunt International Nepal 2011	
2014	Suraj Chiluwal	सुरज चिलुवाल	Besisahar, Lamjung District	Mr. Nepal 2014	
2016	Samim Khan	समिम खान	Pokhara, Kaski District	Manhunt International Nepal 2016	
2023	Shishir Wagle	शिशिर वाग्ले	Pokhara, Kaski District	Mister Supranational Nepal 2023	
2023	Dipendra Shahi	दिपेन्द्र शाही	Pokhara, Kaski District	Unplaced	
2024	Arvin Gurung	अरविन गुरुङ	Besisahar, Lamjung District	Mister Supranational Nepal 2024 Top 5	Mister Best Skin
2024	Manoj Gurung	मनोज गुरुङ	Besisahar, Lamjung District	Mr. Nepal 2024 Top 15	Mister Active; Best Physique
2024	Darpan Singh Giri	दर्पण सिंह गिरी	Pokhara, Kaski District	Mr. Nepal 2025 2nd Runner Up	
