= Sonie Rajbhandari =

Miss Nepal 2014

- Born: Sonie Rajbhandari; Pokhara, Nepal
- Education: Kathmandu University
- Height: 1.70 m (5 ft 7 in)
- Beauty pageant titleholder
- Title: Miss Nepal International 2014; Miss Nepal Earth 2014
- Hair color: Brown
- Eye color: Brown
- Major competitions: Miss Nepal 2014; Miss International 2014

Sonie Rajbhandari (Nepali: सोनिए राजभण्डारी) is a Nepalese model and beauty pageant titleholder. She was crowned Miss Nepal International 2014. Sonie graduated from Kathmandu University School of Management, with a major in Business Management.

== Miss Nepal - 2014 ==
Sonie Rajbhandari was selected as Miss Pokhara in 2014, which gave her the chance to represent her hometown, Pokhara at the Miss Nepal 2014 beauty pageant, where she finished as second runner-up. She also represented Nepal at the Miss International 2014 beauty pageant in Japan.

On 5 April 2015, the Hidden Treasure company announced the withdrawal of the original first runner-up Miss Nepal Earth 2014 - Prinsha Shrestha for violating the rules of the competition. This led Rajbhandari to become the new Miss Nepal Earth 2014 just 2 weeks before the grand finale of Miss Nepal 2015.

In 2016, Rajbhandari managed to raise $10,000 for the April 2015 Nepal earthquake Charity Relief in Nepal.

Awards and achievements
Preceded by Shritima Shah (Nepal)	Miss Nepal International; 2014	Succeeded by Medha Koirala (Nepal)
