= Miss Nepal 2004 =

- Date: August 7, 2004
- Venue: Birendra International Conference Convention Centre, Kathmandu
- Broadcaster: NTV
- Entrants: 18
- Winner: Payal Shakya; Kathmandu

Dabur Vatika Miss Nepal 2004, the 10th Miss Nepal pageant, was held at the Birendra International Convention Centre (BICC). There were protests by feminist activists.

Payal Shakya was crowned Miss Nepal 2004 on August 7, 2004 at Birendra International Convention Center. Sarah Gurung and Anita Gurung won the titles of 1st Runner up and 2nd Runner up, respectively.

== Results ==
Color keys

- The contestant Won in an International pageant.
- The contestant was a Runner-up in an International pageant.
- The contestant was a Semi-Finalist in an International pageant.
- The contestant assumed another title.
- The contestant was not able to compete in an International pageant.
- The contestant did not place but won a Special Award in the pageant.
- The contestant did not place.

| Final results | Contestant | International pageant | International Results |
|---|---|---|---|
| Miss Nepal 2004 (Winner) | Kathmandu - Payal Shakya | Miss World 2004 | Unplaced |
| 1st runner-up (Miss Asia Pacific Nepal 2004) | Kathmandu - Sarah Gurung | Miss Asia Pacific International 2005 | Unplaced |
| 2nd runner-up (Miss Earth Nepal 2004) | (Nepal) Pokhara - Anita Gurung | Miss Earth 2004 | Unplaced |
| Top 5 | Kathmandu – Harina Bogati | | |
| Top 5 | Kathmandu – Mamta Malhotra | | |
| Top 10 | Kathmandu – Deepshikha Shah | | |
| Top 10 | Kathmandu – Rashmi Acharya | | |
| Top 10 | Kathmandu – Shobnam Khadka | | |
| Top 10 | Kathmandu – Shrismita Amatya | | |
| Top 10 | (Nepal) Lalitpur – Sailja Basnet | | |

=== Sub-Titles ===
| Award | Contestant |
|---|---|
| Miss Personality | Kathmandu - Suzan Gurung |
| Miss Best Complexion | Kathmandu - Mamta Malhotra |
| Miss Beautiful Hair | Kathmandu - Mahima Bhattachan |
| Kodak Miss Photogenic | Kathmandu - Payal Shakya |
| Miss Natural Talent | (Nepal) Pokhara - Anita Gurung |
| Imagine Miss Best Dress | Kathmandu - Rashmi Acharya |
| Miss Beautiful Dabur Lal Toothpaste | Kathmandu - Sukriti Baskota |

== Contestants ==
| No | Name | Age | Height | Representing | District | Placement |
|---|---|---|---|---|---|---|
| 1 | Sarah Gurung | 18 | 1.69 m (5 ft 7 in) | Dhobighat | Kathmandu District | 1st Runner Up |
| 2 | Dhartee Sunuwar | 18 | 1.68 m (5 ft 6 in) | Baneshwor | Kathmandu District | |
| 3 | Shrismita Amatya | 21 | 1.70 m (5 ft 7 in) | Kuleshwor | Kathmandu District | Top 10 |
| 4 | Sailja Basnet | 20 | 1.75 m (5 ft 9 in) | Jawalakhel | Lalitpur District | Top 10 |
| 5 | Deepshikha Shah | 18 | 1.68 m (5 ft 6 in) | Lazimpat | Kathmandu District | Top 10 |
| 6 | Suzan Gurung | 20 | 1.68 m (5 ft 6 in) | Lainchaur | Kathmandu District | Miss Personality |
| 7 | Rama Maharjan | 19 | 1.75 m (5 ft 9 in) | Patan | Lalitpur District | |
| 8 | Arati Anand | 19 | 1.68 m (5 ft 6 in) | Nepalgunj | Banke District | |
| 9 | Jigme Dolker Lama | 19 | 1.73 m (5 ft 8 in) | Maharajgunj | Kathmandu District | |
| 10 | Sukriti Baskota | 19 | 1.68 m (5 ft 6 in) | Maharajgunj | Kathmandu District | Miss Beautiful Smile |
| 11 | Shobnam Khadka | 18 | 1.73 m (5 ft 8 in) | Kalanki | Kathmandu District | Top 10 |
| 12 | Anita Gurung | 18 | 1.73 m (5 ft 8 in) | Pokhara | Kaski District | 2nd Runner Up |
| 13 | Mahima Bhattachan | 18 | 1.68 m (5 ft 6 in) | Baluwatar | Kathmandu District | Miss Beautiful Hair |
| 14 | Harina Bogati | 19 | 1.68 m (5 ft 6 in) | Dhobighat | Kathmandu District | Top 5 |
| 15 | Bimina Ranjit | 18 | 1.70 m (5 ft 7 in) | Sanepa | Lalitpur District | |
| 16 | Rashmi Acharya | 24 | 1.70 m (5 ft 7 in) | Nayabazar | Kathmandu District | Top 10, Miss Best Dress |
| 17 | Payal Shakya | 18 | 1.68 m (5 ft 6 in) | Nayabazar | Kathmandu District | WINNER, Miss Photogenic |
| 18 | Mamta Malhotra | 18 | 1.70 m (5 ft 7 in) | Baneshwor | Kathmandu District | Top 5, Miss Best Complexion |
