= Miss Nepal 2014 =

- Date: May 2, 2014
- Venue: Nepal Academy Hall, Kathmandu, Nepal
- Broadcaster: NTV
- Entrants: 20
- Winner: Subin Limbu; Dharan

Hidden Treasures Fanta Miss Nepal 2014, the 17th Miss Nepal beauty pageant was held on 2 May 2014 at the Nepal Academy Hall in Kathmandu. Miss Nepal 2013 Ishani Shrestha crowned her successor as Miss Nepal World 2014, who will represent Nepal at Miss World 2014 with 1st runner up as Miss Nepal Earth 2014 sent to Miss Earth 2014 and 2nd runner up as Miss Nepal International 2014 to Miss International 2014.

The winner of Miss Nepal 2014 will be selected as the brand ambassador of drink, Fanta; WWF Nepal for a year and win Rs 100,000. The auditions of Miss Nepal was held in various regional contests like Miss Pokhara, Miss Chitwan, Miss Kavre, Miss Purwanchal and Miss Kathmandu where all the regional winners get a direct entry to top 20 finalists. All three winners will also get a Samsung phone and an apartment at Suncity apartments by Shangrila from this year forward.

The 20 shortlisted young women aged 19 years and above will be competing for the main title and the pageant is scheduled to be held on live telecast on NTV.

== Results ==
Color keys

- The contestant Won in an International pageant.
- The contestant was a Runner-up in an International pageant.
- The contestant was a Semi-Finalist in an International pageant.
- The contestant assumed another title.
- The contestant was not able to compete in an International pageant.
- The contestant did not place but won a Special Award in the pageant.
- The contestant did not place.

Final results	Contestant	International pageant	International Results
Miss Nepal 2014 (Winner)	(Nepal) Dharan - Subin Limbu	Miss World 2014	Unplaced; Top 10 - People's Choice Award
1st runner-up (Miss Earth Nepal 2014) (dethroned)	Kathmandu - Prinsha Shrestha (dethroned)	Miss Earth 2014	Unplaced; (gold) Yahoo! Beauty for a Cause online competition Top 10 - Eco-Beauty Video
1st runner-up (Miss International Nepal 2014)	(Nepal) Pokhara - Sonie Rajbhandari (assumed)	Miss International 2014	Unplaced
Top 5	Kathmandu – Aastha Pokharel		
Top 5	(Nepal) Lalitpur - Pranayna KC		
Top 10	(Nepal) Chitwan - Sitoshna Ban		
Top 10	(Nepal) Damak – Varsha Rai		
Top 10	(Nepal) Dharan – Neha Bajaj		
Top 10	(Nepal) Kirtipur – Alisha Kunwar		
Top 10	(Nepal) Lalitpur – Rashmita Maharjan		

=== Sub-titles ===
Award	Contestant
The Hidden Treasure Miss Talent	(Nepal) Rasuwa – Lakpa Wangmo Tamang
Shree Ganapati Jewellers Miss Photogenic	(Nepal) Chitwan - Sitoshna Ban
Nanglo Miss Personality	(Nepal) Lalitpur – Pranayna KC
Sulux Miss Punctuality	(Nepal) Kirtipur - Alisha Kunwar
Republica Fanta Miss Bubbly	(Nepal) Rasuwa – Lakpa Wangmo Tamang
Honda Miss Stylish	(Nepal) Pokhara - Sonie Rajbhandari
Hyundai Miss Friendship	(Nepal) Pokhara - Sonie Rajbhandari
Maya's Salon Miss Beautiful Hair	(Nepal) Pokhara - Rashmi Adhikari
Barnan Miss Best Complexion	Kathmandu - Prinsha Shrestha
Ishani's Beauty with a Purpose	Kathmandu - Prinsha Shrestha

== Contestants ==
Province No. 1 & Province No. 2 (Eastern & South-Eastern Regions)
No	Name	Age	Height	Representing	District	Placement	Notes
2	Varsha Rai	20	1.75 m (5 ft 9 in)	Damak	Jhapa District	Top 10	Miss Purwanchal 2013 2nd Runner Up
3	Priyanka Jha	21	1.73 m (5 ft 8 in)	Janakpur	Dhanusa District		
5	Subin Limbu	23	1.78 m (5 ft 10 in)	Dharan	Sunsari District	Winner	
7	Neha Bajaj	20	1.75 m (5 ft 9 in)	Dharan	Sunsari District	Top 10	Miss Purwanchal 2013
9	Grishma Basnet	19	1.70 m (5 ft 7 in)	Morang	Morang District		Miss Global International 2013
20	Richa Bhattarai	20	1.70 m (5 ft 7 in)	Morang	Morang District		

Bagmati Province (Central Regions)
No	Name	Age	Height	Representing	District	Placement	Notes
1	Prinsha Shrestha	22	1.73 m (5 ft 8 in)	Kathmandu	Kathmandu District	1st Runner Up; Miss Best Complexion; Beauty with a Purpose	Dethroned after competing in Miss Eco 2014 pageant without the permission of Hidden Treasure.
4	Lakpa Wangmo	22	1.70 m (5 ft 7 in)	Rasuwa	Rasuwa District	Miss Talent; Miss Bubbly	Miss Tamang 2013
10	Rashmita Maharjan	23	1.73 m (5 ft 8 in)	Lalitpur	Lalitpur District	Top 10	
11	Sitoshna Ban	20	1.78 m (5 ft 10 in)	Chitwan	Chitwan District	Top 10; Miss Photogenic	
12	Alisha Kunwar	21	1.73 m (5 ft 8 in)	Kirtipur	Kathmandu District	Top 10; Miss Punctuality	Miss Global 2012 1st Runner Up
13	Sarala Nepal	24	1.75 m (5 ft 9 in)	Nuwakot	Nuwakot District		
14	Mona Bajracharya	21	1.68 m (5 ft 6 in)	Kavre	Kavrepalanchok District		Quit due to family reasons.
17	Aastha Pokharel	22	1.80 m (5 ft 11 in)	Kathmandu	Kathmandu District	Top 5	Asia's Next Top Model (cycle 1) Top 5
18	Rajnita Bhetwal	21	1.70 m (5 ft 7 in)	Kathmandu	Kathmandu District		
19	Pranayna KC	24	1.78 m (5 ft 10 in)	Lalitpur	Lalitpur District	4th Runner Up; Miss Personality	

Gandaki Province & Lumbini Province (Western & South-Western Regions)
No	Name	Age	Height	Representing	District	Placement	Notes
6	Priyanka Bhandari	20	1.70 m (5 ft 7 in)	Gorkha	Gorkha District		
8	Namita Gurung	22	1.70 m (5 ft 7 in)	Lumbini	Rupandehi District		Miss Gurung 2012
15	Rashmi Adhikari	20	1.73 m (5 ft 8 in)	Pokhara	Kaski District	Miss Beautiful Hair	Miss Pokhara 2013
16	Sonie Rajbhandari	24	1.70 m (5 ft 7 in)	Pokhara	Kaski District	2nd Runner Up; Miss Friendship; Miss Stylish	Appointed as new Miss Nepal Earth 2014 after Prinsha Shrestha got dethroned from her title, two weeks before Miss Nepal 2015 final event.

== Previous experience ==
- (#1) Prinsha Shrestha was Miss Ecollege 2009 1st runner up.
- (#2) Varsha Rai was Miss Purwanchal 2013 2nd runner up.
- (#4) Lakpa Tamang is Miss Tamang 2013.
- (#6) Priyanka Bhandari is the winner of Miss Global International 2012.
- (#7) Neha Bajaj won the regional pageant of Miss Purwanchal 2013.
- (#8) Namita Gurung was Miss Tamusyo 2011.
- (#9) Grishma Basnet won Miss Ecollege 2012.
- (#10) Rashmita Maharjan was the winner of Mega Model Season 2 Winner
- (#11) Sitoshna Ban won the regional contest of Miss Chitwan 2013.
- (#12) Alisha Kunwar was Miss Nepal Global 2012 1st runner up.
- (#15) Rasmi Adhikari won the regional pageant of Miss Pokhara 2013.
- (#17) Aastha Pokharel won Supermodel Nepal 2013 and placed 5th in the first season of Asia's Next Top Model.
