= Wilkes University =

Private university in Wilkes-Barre, Pennsylvania, US

- Former names: Bucknell University Junior College (1933–1947); Wilkes College (1947–1989)
- Motto: "Unity Amidst Diversity"
- Type: Private university
- Established: 1933; 93 years ago
- Accreditation: MSCHE
- Religious affiliation: Nonsectarian
- Endowment: $75 million (2026)
- Budget: $120 million (2025)
- President: James Cousins
- Provost: David M. Ward
- Academic staff: 374 (2026)
- Faculty: 164 full time (2026)
- Total staff: 538 (2026)
- Students: 5,381 (Spring 2026)
- Undergraduates: 2,076 (Spring 2026)
- Postgraduates: 3,305 (Spring 2026)
- Location: Wilkes-Barre, Pennsylvania, U.S. 41°14′36″N 75°53′27″W
- Campus: Urban, Small City, 35 acres (14 ha)
- Annual: Amnicola
- Newspaper: The Beacon
- Colors: Blue; Gold
- Nickname: Colonels
- Sporting affiliations: NCAA Division III – Landmark Conference
- Mascot: Colonel
- Website: wilkes.edu
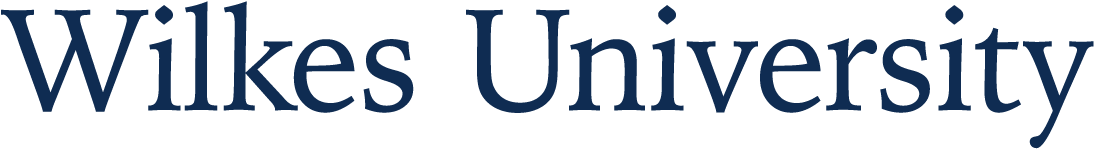

Wilkes University is a private university in Wilkes-Barre, Pennsylvania. It has over 2,200 undergraduates and over 2,200 graduate students (both full and part-time). Wilkes was founded in 1933 as a satellite campus of Bucknell University, and became an independent institution in 1947, naming itself Wilkes College, after English radical politician John Wilkes after whom Wilkes-Barre is named. The school was granted university status in January 1990. It is classified among "Doctoral/Professional Universities" (D/PU) and accredited by the Middle States Commission on Higher Education.

The university's mascot is a colonel and the official colors are blue and yellow. The campus symbol is a letter "W" known as the "flying W" by students and alumni.

== History ==
=== Mid-twentieth century ===
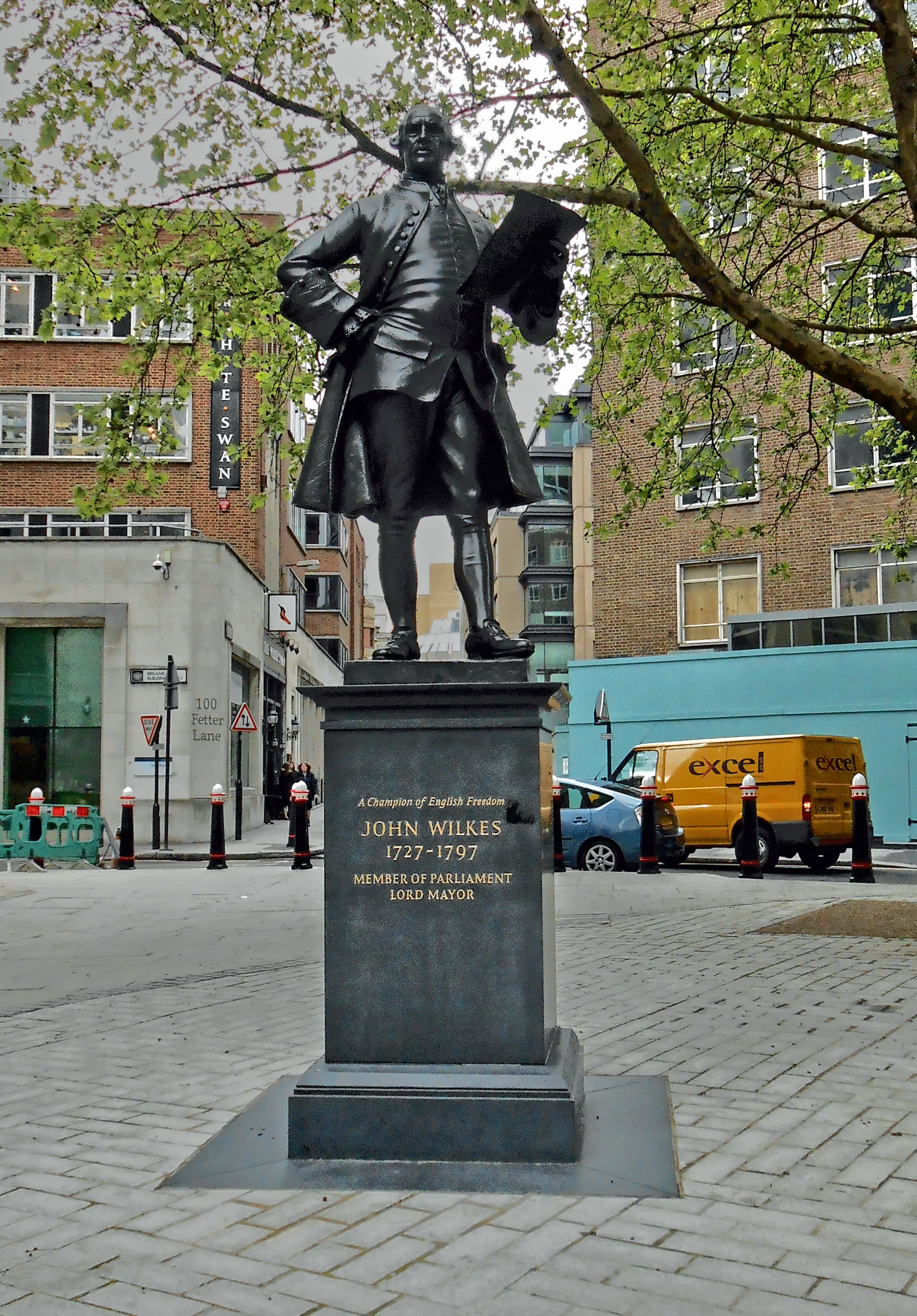
Statue of John Wilkes, the university's namesake, in England

Wilkes University was first established in 1933 by Bucknell University under the name "Bucknell University Junior College" (BUJC) in Wilkes-Barre. Frank G. Davis, chair of the Education department at Bucknell, first developed the idea of BUJC and served as an early liaison between BUJC and Bucknell. BUJC attracted many students who were the first members of their families to benefit from higher education as the need for junior colleges arose in urban areas. The college opened in downtown Wilkes-Barre, where the first classes were held on the third floor of the Wilkes-Barre Business College building. By 1934, the business college moved out of the building and BUJC had taken it over and continued to grow over the years, acquiring old mansions for student housing, classrooms, and administration offices along the streets of South River and South Franklin. By 1945, the board of trustees formally moved to develop the junior college into a four-year institution.

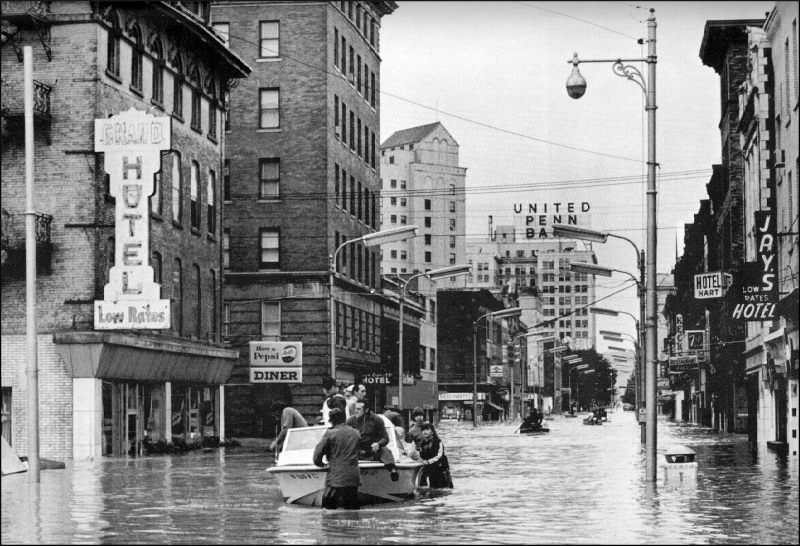
The 1972 Agnes flood between campus and Wilkes-Barre, PA square

In 1947, "Wilkes College" was instituted as an independent, nondenominational four-year college, with programs in the arts, sciences, and a number of professional fields, as well as numerous extracurricular activities. The student body in the postwar period was primarily composed of Luzerne County residents, especially G.I. bill recipients. In the 1950s, increasing numbers of students elected to live on campus, which led to a rapid expansion in on-campus student housing. Increased federal funding for science and engineering in the 1950s led the college to develop academic programs in those areas, build the Stark Learning Center, and increase enrollment.

In 1972, the Wilkes Barre area experienced the devastation of Hurricane/Tropical Storm Agnes that flooded much of the campus and downtown region.

=== Late twentieth century ===
Wilkes College became "Wilkes University" in December 1989, and the school officially received university status a month later, in January 1990.

Wilkes University opened the School of Pharmacy in 1996, and in 1999, through a donation from Mrs. Geraldine Nesbitt Orr, the Nesbitt School of Pharmacy was established.

The Thomas P. (Pettus) Shelburne Jr. Telecommunications Center was built under the guidance of chief engineer Carl Brigido and dedicated by Wilkes University in the lower level of the Stark Learning Center in 1996. Secured after a major gift from Shelburne's widow Catherine and family and fundraising efforts of long time Communication Studies professors, Bradford L. Kinney and Thomas Bigler. This was the second television studio on campus, previously located in two small rooms on the second floor of the Stark Learning Center. The Shelburne Center became the first dedicated space built with first use equipment for the direct purpose of media education with multiple editing bays, two studio spaces, educational break out teaching space and director offices and storage. The Shelburne Center served for twenty years as the precursor to the Clayton and Theresa Karambelas Media and Communications Center dedicated in 2017 that consolidated all of the university media holdings for instruction.

=== Early twenty-first century ===
The Jay S. Sidhu School of Business & Leadership was created in 2004 and the university purchased a 80,000 sq ft (7,400 m^{2}) building in downtown Wilkes-Barre. to house the expanding school. Initially named the Center on Main, the building houses the Sidhu School of Business and Leadership, an indoor track and field, and ropes course. In 2021 the Center on Main was formally named after Ron and Rhea Simms to be known as Simms Center on Main.

The Henry Student Center was expanded in 2005.

By 2014, Wilkes University grew to include eight academic buildings, 20 residence halls, nine administrative buildings, and other facilities such as the Eugene S. Farley Library, the Henry Student Center, and athletic complexes.

On April 17, 2015, Wilkes University dedicated the main university mailroom facility located on the second floor of the Henry Student Center as the Edward Elgonitis Sr. Mailroom or simply "Eddie's Mailroom" in honor of the thirty-three year dedicated Wilkes University staff member.

On August 31, 2017, the university dedicated the Clayton and Theresa Karambelas Media and Communication Center, built within the structure of the original Bartikowsky Jewelers building on 25 West South Street by the Sordoni Contractors to be the first constructed to hold all the university media instruction holdings into one consolidated building. The building also houses the Sordoni Art Gallery that moved from its original location on the first level of the Stark Learning Center.

In March 2020, Wilkes University temporarily suspended in-person instruction and evacuated the campus as a safety measure to address the global COVID-19 pandemic. Under the leadership of interim president Paul S. Adams, the university continued basic operations and was able to safely re-open following strict protocols. Commencement for the Class of 2020 was postponed and eventually held in-person along with the Class of 2021.

=== Presidents ===
- Eugene S. Farley, 1936–1970, Chief Administrative Officer of Wilkes precursor Bucknell University Junior College and first president of Wilkes University Wilkes' first holder of Chancellor/Honorary President title upon retirement.
- Francis J. Michelini, 1970–1975, first president to ascend from the academic ranks of the university Resigned to become President of Pennsylvania Commission on Independent Colleges and Universities.
- Robert S. Capin, '50* H'83, 1975–1984, first university alumnus to serve as president Wilkes first holder of President Emeritus title upon retirement as president and returning to the business faculty.
- Christopher N. Breiseth, 1984-2001, first president hired as part of a national recruitment search; retired to accept position as founding president and CEO of Franklin and Eleanor Roosevelt Institute
- Joseph "Tim" E. Gilmour, 2001-2012
- Patrick F. Leahy, 2012–2019, resigned effective July 31, 2019, to accept presidency of Monmouth University
- Alan Gregory "Greg" Cant, 2020–2026, first internationally born president having hailed from Adelaide, Australia
- James Cousins, 2026-present

=== Interim presidents ===
- Robert S. Capin, '50* H'83, 1974, promoted to president in 1975
- Paul S. Adams, '77, '82*, 2019-2020, second university alumnus to serve as president and first to ascend from the student affairs division

== Campus ==
=== Academic buildings ===
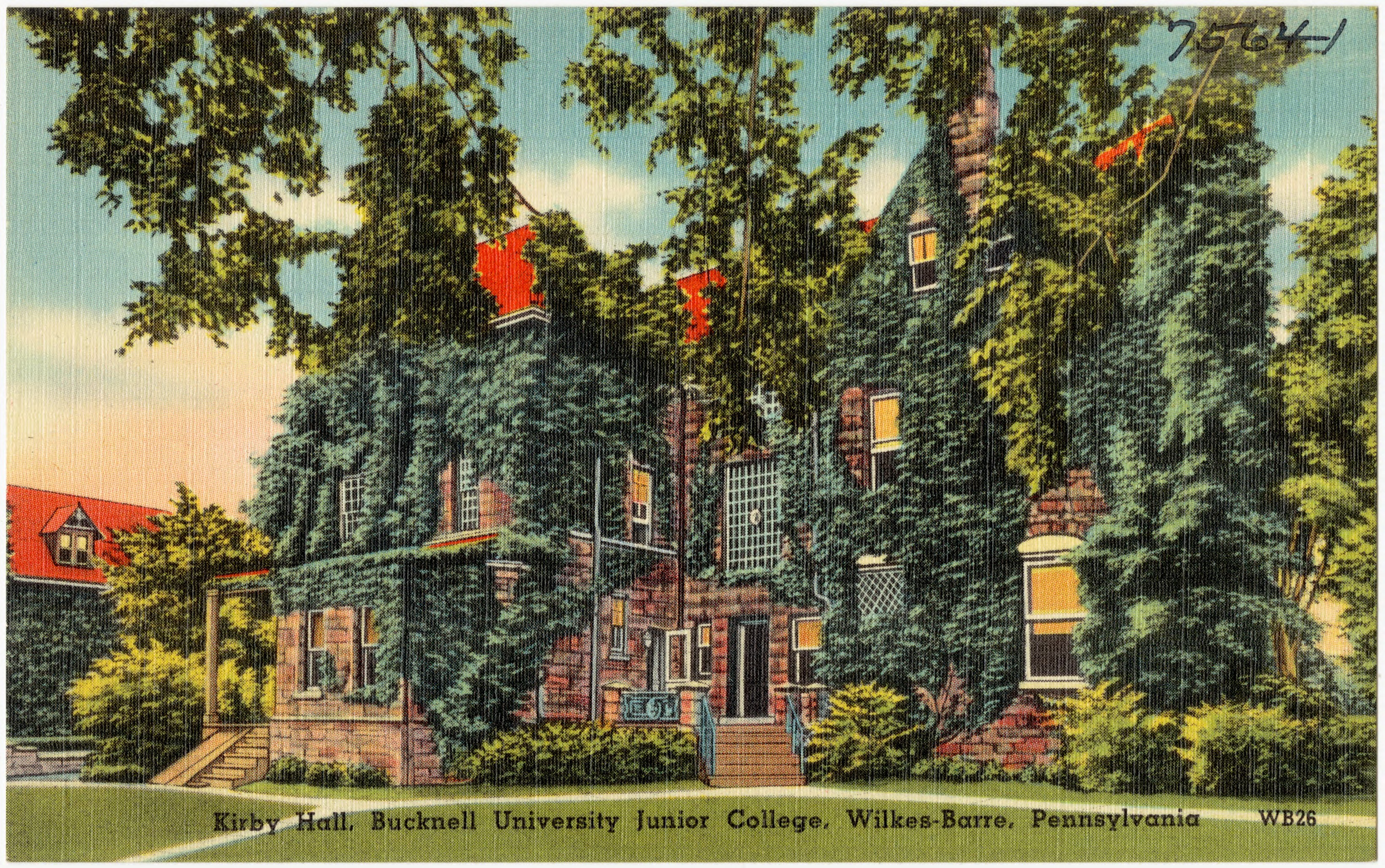
Kirby Hall served as one of the primary academic buildings for Bucknell University Junior College, Wilkes College and currently Wilkes University, housing the English Department.

Most of the academic buildings are located within the same city block, between South River Street, South Franklin Street, South Street, and Northampton Street. The Stark Learning Center (SLC), located on South River Street, is the largest building on campus with 220,000 sq ft (20,000 m^{2}) housing classrooms, laboratories, and office space. The facility consists of nursing, math and engineering offices and classrooms. Stark Learning Center received extensive renovation in 2018.

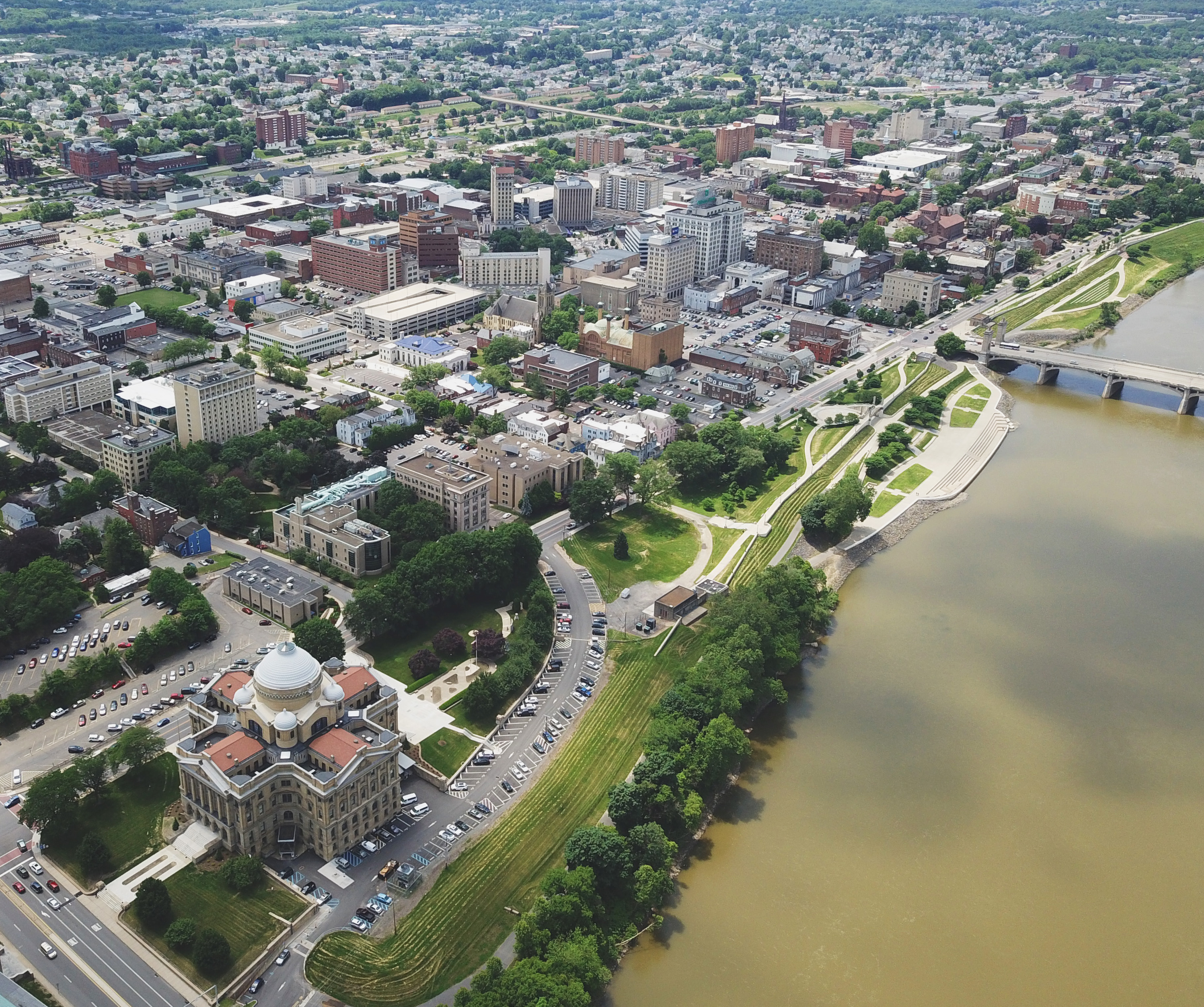
Wilkes University campus runs along the Susquehanna River and Kirby Riverfront "River Commons" Park.

Classrooms and offices for humanities and social sciences are located in Breiseth Hall, a three-story building located on South Franklin Street, in the same block as SLC. Kirby Hall, a mansion formerly home to Fred Morgan Kirby, was renovated to house offices and classrooms for English.

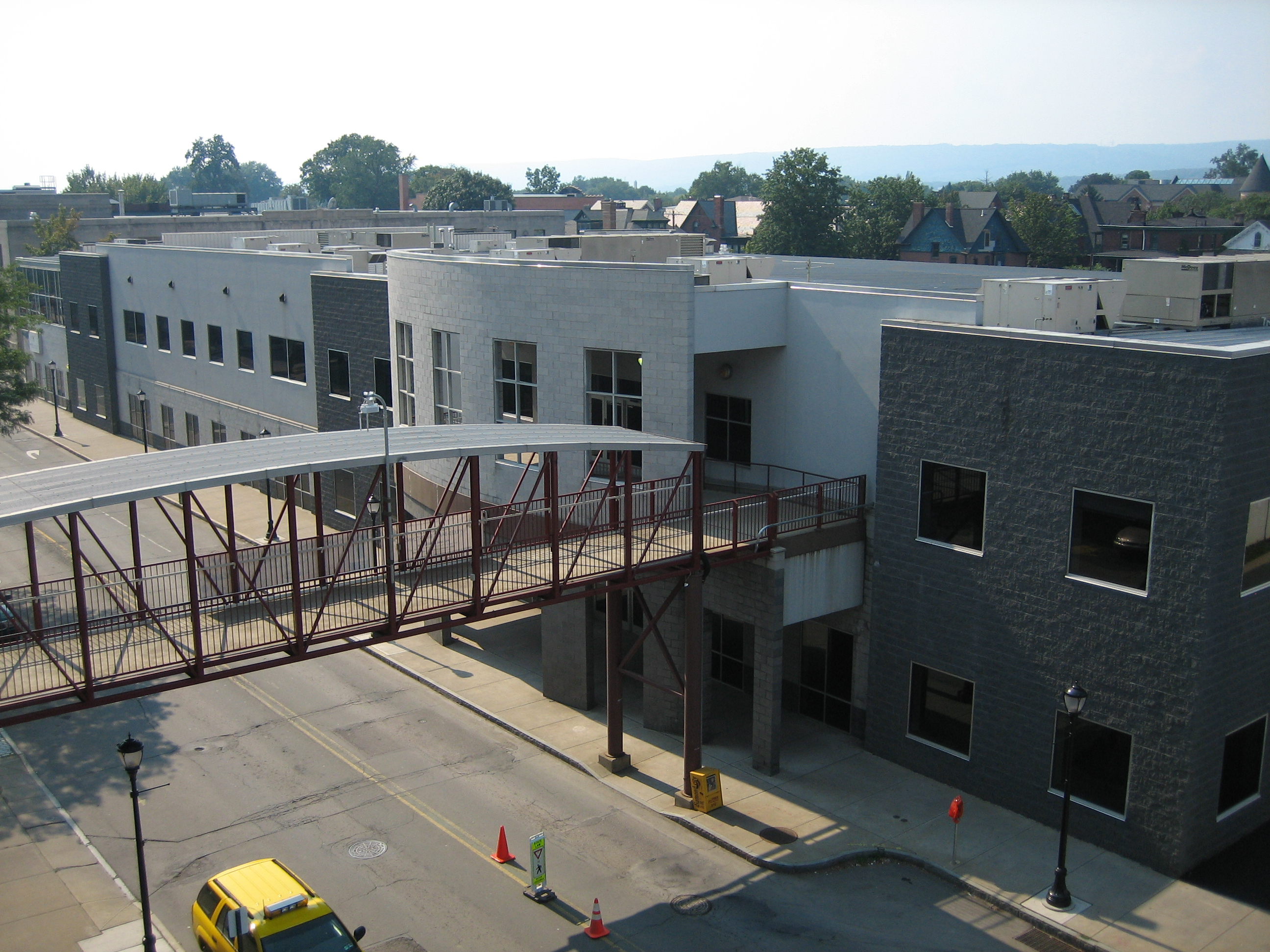
The Sidhu School of Business and Leadership is housed in the modern Ron & Rhea Simms Center on Main

The Cohen Science Center, a $35 million project, was established to house the biology and health sciences, chemistry and biochemistry, and environmental engineering and earth sciences departments. The facility has been built to LEED silver standards for environmental sustainability and allows for students to monitor energy use, water use, and general building performance to aid sustainability studies. The building also features a rooftop vegetation area for greenhouse purposes and to assist in reducing rain runoff.

=== Simms Center on Main (formerly University Center on Main) ===
In 2005, the university acquired the former Wilkes-Barre Call Center building and parking garage on South Main Street. The parking garage is currently being used for student and faculty parking. The Public Safety department has remodeled and relocated to the basement of the garage. The Call Center building was renovated and renamed University Center on Main. The building now houses recreation facilities including tennis and basketball courts, and a rock climbing wall. In summer 2014, the building was renovated to also house the Sidhu School of Business and Leadership. On August 11, 2021, the center was formally named after Ron and Rhea Simms to be known as Simms Center on Main.

=== Residential Halls ===
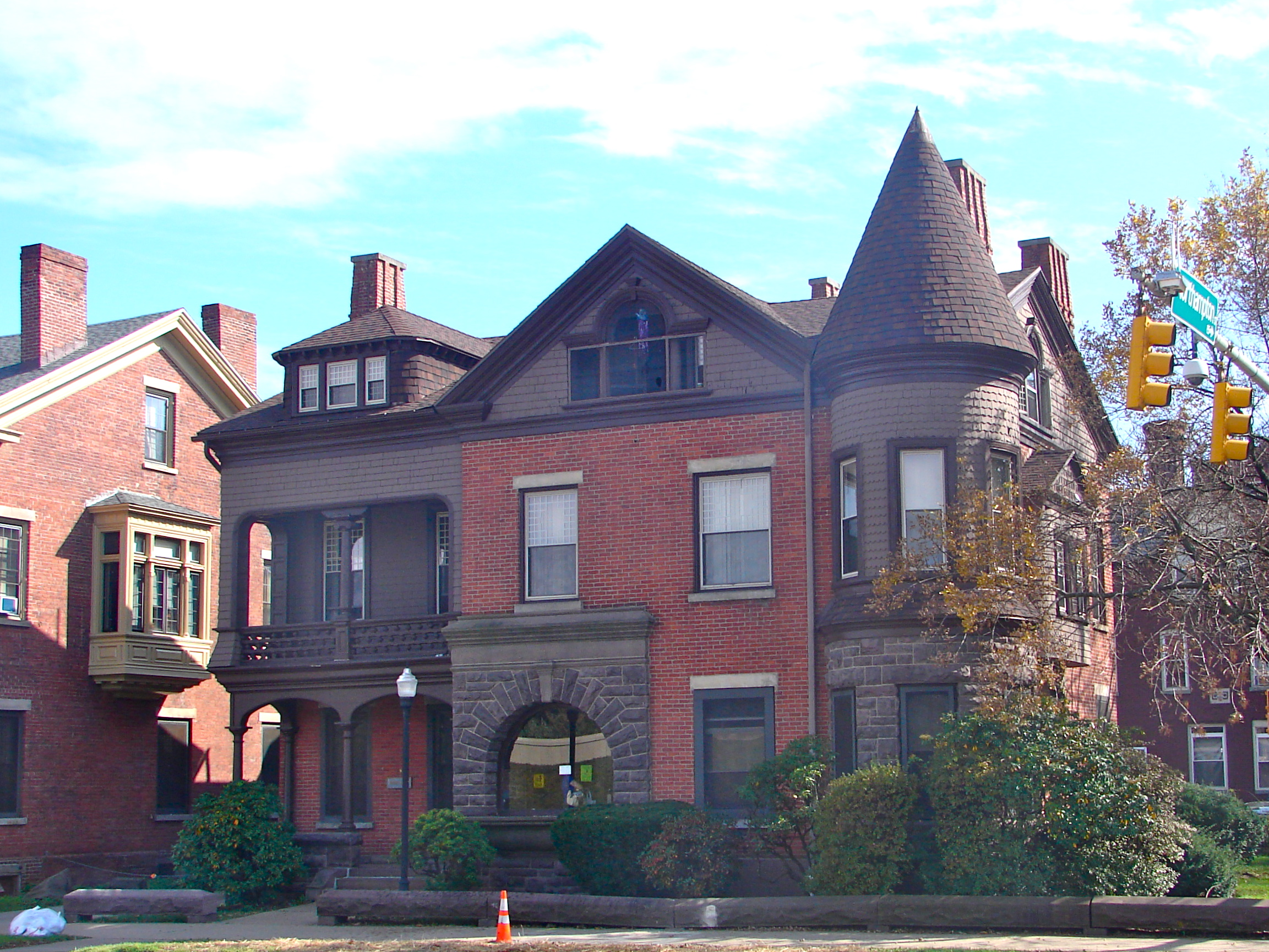
Weiss Residence Hall, an example of the unique former mansions students reside.

The campus offers seventeen different residence halls and apartment buildings for all levels of students, although some apartments are reserved for upperclassmen. Many residence halls are located in 19th century mansions that were donated to the university, or other houses purchased by the university. Over 11 mansion and house style residence halls are used throughout the campus. Apartment style residences are found in University Towers and Rifkin Hall. Non-apartment residence halls include Catlin Hall, Doane Hall, Evans Hall, Fortinsky Halls, Michelini Hall, Passan Hall, Ross Hall, Roth Hall, Schiowitz Hall, Sterling Hall, Sturdevant Hall, Sullivan Hall, University Towers, Waller Halls (North and South), and Weiss Hall. Dr. Francis J. Michelini Hall houses students registered for the university Honors Program. First year and second year students are required to live in residence halls (commuters are exempt), and can live off-campus starting their third year.

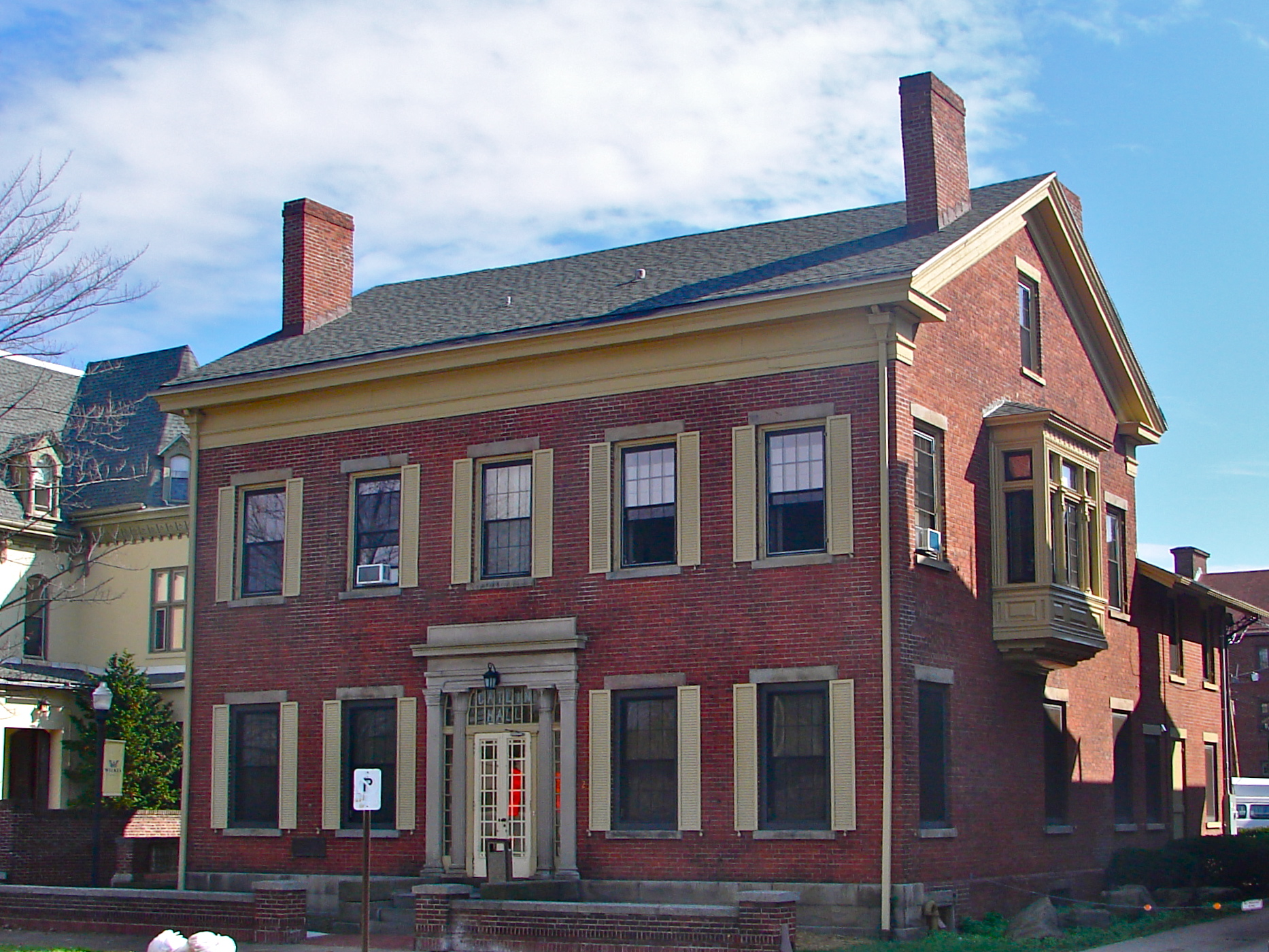
Catlin Residence Hall, another example of traditional architecture student live.

Traditional dormitory housing is provided at Evans Residence Hall. With four floors and about 200 students, Evans Residence Hall is the largest first-year student residential hall on the Wilkes University campus. Renovated in 2008, Chesapeake and Delaware Residence Halls were re-dedicated as Lawrence W. Roth Residence Hall, a residential hall connecting the previously separate Chesapeake and Delaware Residence Halls. It is a first year student, non-traditional residential hall house with about seventy residents and three RAs. Students living on campus have access to laundry facilities, basic cable, and local phone service.

The university purchased the University Towers apartment complex located at 10 East South Street from a private real estate company for $8.1 million. Approximately 400 students are housed in this building's 130 units. Part of the nearby YMCA building has been renovated into apartment style residences and houses upperclassman. The apartments are known as 40 West.

=== Colonel Corner University Bookstore ===
The university partnered with neighboring King's College to operate a joint for-profit bookstore in downtown Wilkes-Barre. The new bookstore opened in October 2006, consolidating two independent bookstores into one new facility. The new bookstore, run by Barnes & Noble College Booksellers, was located in the basement and first floor of the Innovation Center on South Main Street. The bookstore included a full selection of general trade books, a full-service Starbucks cafe, lounges and study areas, and a spirit shop featuring products from both Wilkes and King's College. In 2021 the bookstore returned to the main campus no longer partnered with King's College. Colonel Corner is located inside the Henry Student Center and offers school supplies and spirit wear.

=== Karambelas Media and Communications Center ===
In August 2017, the university dedicated the newly renovated Bartikowsky Jewelers building as the Clayton and Theresa Karambelas Media and Communications Center. It houses WCLH 90.7 FM (the university radio station), the Beacon newspaper, Zebra Communications (a student-run public relations agency) and the Sordoni Art Gallery.

=== Dorothy Dickson Darte Center for the Performing Arts ===
The Darte Center is the home of performing arts at Wilkes University. Built in 1965 to replace the Chase Theater (a converted carriage house), it includes the Darling Theater, which seats 478, a black box theater which seats 48, and a two-story music building. The land on which the Darte Center sits was donated by the Wyoming Valley Society of Arts and Sciences. The building was financed by an anonymous donation of $1 million by Dorothy Dickson Darte and dedicated in her honor after her death. In late October 2022 Wilkes University announced the receipt of a 2.5 million grant that will finance major renovations to the center, particularly to bring the performing arts center to ADA compliance.

=== Eugene Shedden Farley Library ===
In 1968, Wilkes College dedicated the newly constructed Eugene Shedden Farley Library and named it after the college's first president. The library initially contained four special collection rooms - dedicated to Admiral Harold Stark, Eleanor C. Farley, Gilbert McClintock, and Wyoming Valley residents of Polish heritage. The Polish room was designed by Stefan Mrozewski in the Zakopane Style, and Stefan Hellersperk carved the furniture. The first Norman Mailer Room was dedicated in 2000, and the second Norman Mailer Room and Collection were dedicated in October 2019. The Harold Cox Archives room, which houses the Wilkes University Archives, was dedicated in 2004 and 2013. As of 2019, the library contained 200,000 books and bound journals, 75,000 electronic journals, and 430 newspaper and journal subscriptions, as well as circulating technology like iPads and laptops.

== Academics ==
Wilkes University offers majors in science, education, engineering, business, and liberal arts for undergraduate and graduate students. The university offers over a dozen programs within its graduate school programs. The Wilkes Graduate Teacher Education Program hosts classes online and at classroom sites across Pennsylvania. Some of the Wilkes Graduate Teacher Education programs are hosted entirely online. Other graduate programs such as nursing, creative writing, and bioengineering are also offered at the university.

Academic programs at Wilkes University are divided among three colleges:

- Bing K. Wong College of Arts and Sciences: The Bing K. Wong College of Arts and Sciences includes programs in the performing arts, humanities, behavioral and social sciences, environmental sciences and natural sciences. The college was named in 2026 for Professor Emeritus Bing K. Wong a long-time faculty member after he made the largest individual donation in the school history. The money donated came from an initial investment by Wong of 200 shares at $13.00 of Apple stock he invested in 1983.
- College of Business and Engineering: Programs in Electrical Engineering, Environmental Engineering, and Mechanical Engineering are accredited by the Engineering Accreditation Commission (EAC) of the Accreditation Board of Engineering and Technology (ABET). All graduate and undergraduate programs in the Jay S. Sidhu School of Business and Leadership are accredited by the Association to Advance Collegiate Schools of Business.
- College of Health and Education: The College of Health and Education houses the Nesbitt School of Pharmacy which is accredited by the Accreditation Council for Pharmacy Education, the Passan School of Nursing whose undergraduate baccalaureate program in nursing is approved by the Pennsylvania State Board of Nurse Examiners and is accredited by the Commission on Collegiate Nursing Education, and the Richard Abbas Alley School of Education.

=== Accreditation ===
Wilkes University is accredited by the Middle States Commission on Higher Education with specific programs having disciplinary accreditation from various relevant accrediting bodies.

=== TRiO program ===
Wilkes University has hosted a federally funded TRiO Upward Bound program on campus since 1967. It is a program for low-income and first-generation students with college potential and aspiration to prepare for college.

=== Rankings ===
In U.S. News & World Report's 2022 rankings, Wilkes ranked #234 in the National University Overall category, #82 in Top Performers on Social Mobility, #205 in Best Undergraduate Engineering Programs, and #413 in Nursing. The Princeton Review, in their 2022 rankings, ranked Wilkes for the "Best Northeastern" rankings.

== Student life ==
Student body composition as of February 29, 2024
Race and ethnicity	Total
White	72%
Black	11%
Asian	3%
Hispanic	7%
Other	2%
Foreign national	5%
Economic diversity
Low-income	38%
Affluent	62%

Wilkes University has numerous student-run clubs and organizations that are recognized and funded by the student government. Many of the clubs are athletically focused, representing sports including crew, lacrosse, running, skiing, volleyball, and ultimate Frisbee. Clubs associated with academics and majors represent psychology, sociology, criminology, and pre-pharmacy. Other clubs are formed around common interests such as animal advocacy, vegetarianism, anime, and robotics.

Wilkes has an active student media, including a television station within the Karambelas Media and Communications Center, FM radio station WCLH (call letters stand for Wilkes College Listens Here) which celebrated its 50th anniversary in 2022, weekly newspaper The Beacon, a literary magazine Manuscript which celebrated its 75th anniversary in 2022, and yearbook Amnicola which will celebrate its 75th anniversary in 2023. The university's newspaper was originally published as the Bison Stampede and annual was published as the "Bucknell Junior College Amnicola" in 1934. The newspaper was later renamed The Beacon, and the annual was shortened to simply "Amnicola". The university paper and annual celebrated their 90th anniversaries in 2024.

Wilkes University Programming Board, an entertainment and event planning organization, has hosted events that featured Pennsylvania based bands such as Live and Fuel, and national favorites including Alanis Morissette, Rusted Root, Joan Osborne, Dashboard Confessional, Lifehouse, Busta Rhymes, Hoobastank, Jack's Mannequin, and Billy Joel.

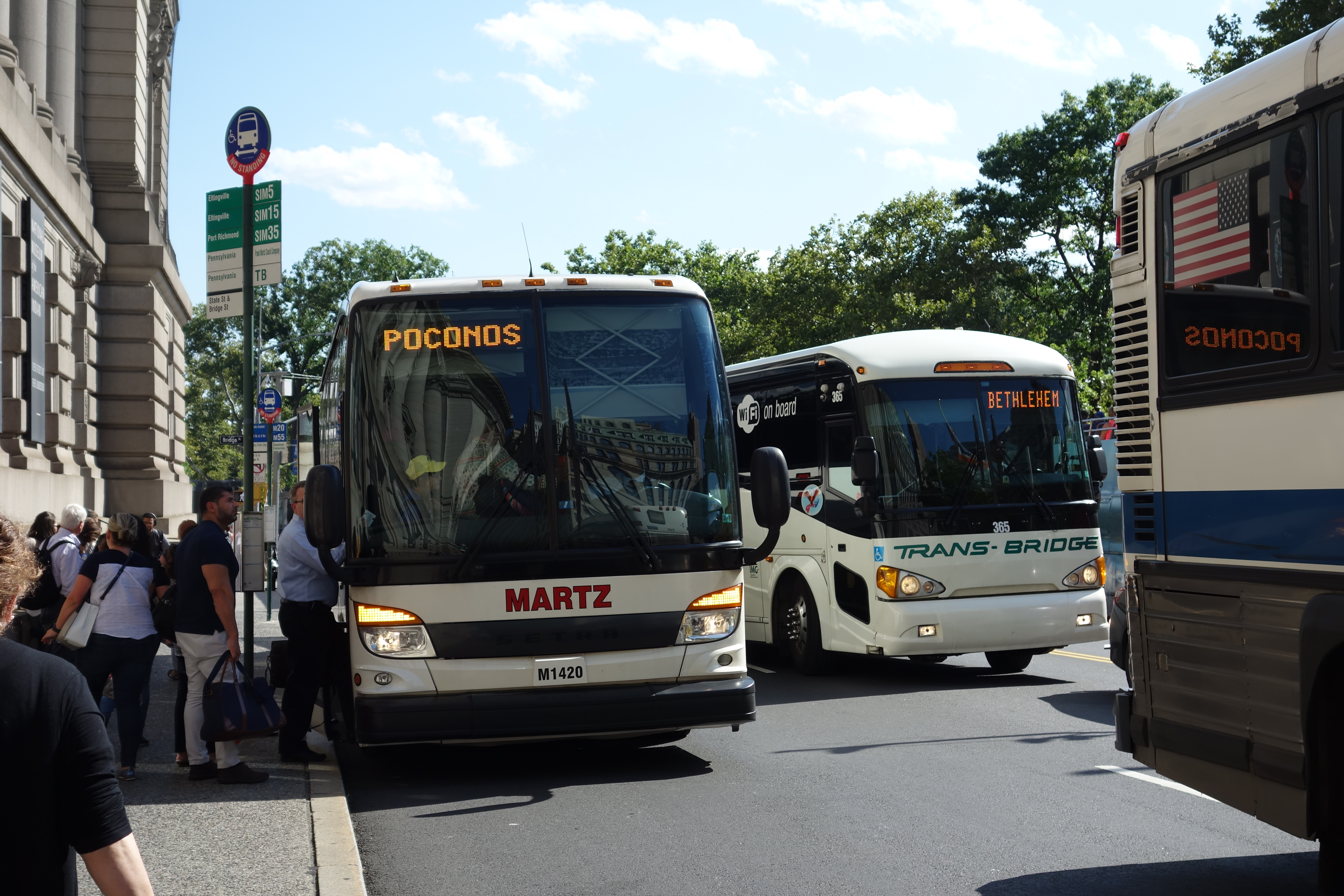
Students use Martz Trailways buses to return between campus and home/major cities.

Wilkes University launched the first collegiate marching band in the northeast Pennsylvania region in 2014. The university said that the new marching band will be a welcomed new tradition and it will contribute to a growth in school spirit. The band was disbanded in 2021 due to budget concerns.

=== Henry Student Center ===
The Frank M. and Dorothea Henry Student Center (HSC) is the student center on campus. The HSC was originally built in 1999, and has continued to serve the students through the present day. The Henry Student Center seeks to provide on-campus activities for all the students of Wilkes as well as maintain partnerships within the community that accentuate the student and community experience. A game room is also located in the student center, complete with multiple pool tables, TVs with wiis connected, ping pong, and other games.

The building is home to most of the student organizations on campus, as well as the dining facilities that are run by Sodexo Incorporated and a campus bookstore run by Barnes and Noble. All recognized student organizations can reserve space, or at least a meeting area to conduct business. The student-run journalism yearbook Amnicola and newspaper The Beacon, have both business office and production space in the first floor. The second floor holds the university Edward Elgonitis Sr. Mailroom or simply "Eddie's Mailroom", shipping services and student mailboxes.

Within the building second floor corridor are framed portraits of every study body president to have served as the head Student Government leader since the inception of the school.

Large meeting space that can be reserved by the Wilkes community are the Savitz Multicultural Room that includes a student painted multicultural mural that was led by long time art faculty member Sharon Cosgrove, Miller Meeting Room and the Paul S. '77 '82 and Jean Ritter '78 Adams Commons (formerly the Student Center Ballroom).

The building was named after Frank M., who served as an executive officer of the local family owned bus transportation company Martz Group, a service that continues to be used by countless generations of Wilkes students to return to and from campus for visits home using the many bus routes along the northeastern corridor and its connection services. His wife, Dorothea, was an active volunteer in the surrounding community.

Renovations for the new Henry Student Center began shortly after its initial opening to expand space in 2005 for student meetings on the 2nd floor, and continued with moderate renovations most recently with the Adams Commons (formerly the Student Center Ballroom) in 2023.

=== Student government ===
The Student Government organization at Wilkes hosts many annual events for undergraduates such as Homecoming and Winter Weekend, an annual themed weekend event in which teams of students participate in various competitive challenges such as team skits and eating contests. The Wilkes Student Government also coordinates all the other university organizations and clubs by formulating student activity budgets and reviewing fund requests. The organization is composed of various executive positions and councils including the president, presidents of Commuter Council, Inter-residence Hall Council, representatives, and a president from each class.

=== Dining ===
There is currently one Aramark operated full-scale buffet-style dining facility on the Wilkes campus located within the Henry Student Center on the second floor. A location designated as the Rifkin Cafe includes a convenience store and sandwich shop (where convenience store-like food and beverages are sold) is located on the first floor of the Henry Student Center. There are also small shops operated by Aramark throughout the campus such as the Colonel Gambini Cafe Starbucks Coffee Shop named in honor of long-time food services staff member Glenn Gambini.

=== ROTC program ===
Detachment 752 of the Air Force Reserve Officer Training Corps is located at Wilkes University. Established in 1973, AF ROTC Detachment 752 has trained and prepared hundreds of young men and women for future careers as USAF officers. Wilkes also offers Army ROTC, but the classes are held at nearby King's College. When students graduate from Wilkes and complete the ROTC program, they earn a commission as an officer in their respective military branches. The detachment serves 12 other crosstown colleges and universities in Northeast Pennsylvania.

=== Athletics ===
Wilkes athletics monogram

The Wilkes University Colonels compete in NCAA Division III athletics. The university is a member of the Landmark Conference. Wilkes offers numerous intercollegiate sports team organizations at the university. Wilkes men's intercollegiate sports teams include baseball, basketball, cross country, football, golf, lacrosse, soccer, swimming, tennis and wrestling. Wilkes women's intercollegiate sports teams include basketball, cross country, field hockey, golf, lacrosse, soccer, softball, swimming, tennis, volleyball and wrestling.

==== Men's conference titles ====
In 2007, the Wilkes University baseball team was the MAC Freedom Conference champion. Prior to that, the baseball team had been conference champion in 1994 and 1977.

In the 2007-2008 men's basketball season, the Wilkes men's team went 13-12 overall and finished fourth in the conference. Previously, the men's basketball team was Freedom Conference champion for the 2000–2001 season, 1998–99 season, 1997–98 season, and 1995–96 season.

The Wilkes University football team was the MAC champion for the 2006 season, and previously, the football team had been conference champion in 1993 and 1974. In the mid-1960s the Wilkes College football program had 32 straight wins—the fourth longest streak in college football history at the time. It began in the fourth game of the 1965 season and ended in 1969. From a 34–0 victory over Ursinus to a 13–7 loss to Ithaca. Rollie Schmidt coached the Colonels from 1962 to 1981. His teams went 90-73-1 winning five MAC titles, two Lambert Bowls (best small college team in the East) and one Timmie Award (best small college team in the country).

The men's tennis team was MAC Freedom Conference champion in 2008, 2009, 2010, 2011, 2012, 2013, 2014, 2015, and 2016.

The Wilkes wrestling team has won a total of 14 Middle Atlantic Conference team championships. In 1974, the team won the NCAA Div. III national championship, afterward, the Colonels moved to the NCAA Div. I ranks for 25 seasons before returning to Div. III ranks in 2000.

==== Women's conference titles ====
The Wilkes University women's field hockey team was MAC champions in 2013 and 1999. In 2008 the women's field hockey team was ranked 18th in the nation by the NCAA.

In 2005, the Wilkes women's soccer team was the MAC Freedom Conference champion. The following year, the Wilkes women's softball team won the MAC region in 2006. Prior to that, the women's softball team was the MAC champion in 1982.

The women's tennis team at Wilkes was the MAC Freedom Conference champion in 2006, 2008, 2009, 2010, 2011, 2012, 2013, and 2014. The women's volleyball team was the conference champion in 2006, 2008, 2009, 2010, and 2011. The women's ice hockey team won the inaugural MAC Conference championship in 2025.

Women's golf and women's swimming, both NCAA Division III intercollegiate sports, were introduced to Wilkes University's sports roster in the 2014–2015 season in the Middle Atlantic Conference. Women's wrestling was introduced for 2025-2026.

== Annual and major campus events ==
=== Lecture series ===
The university sponsors and hosts academically focused lectures series for its students and community. The Max Rosenn Lecture Series in Law and Humanities was established in the 1980s, and has brought many speakers to the university including author Norman Mailer, Supreme Court Justice John Paul Stevens, and journalist Bob Woodward. The Allan P. Kirby Lecture in Free Enterprise and Entrepreneurship has also hosted speakers including journalist and television host John Stossel, and former New York governor George Pataki. The United Nations lecture series was launched in the 2011–2012 academic year and the program brings U.N. officials to the campus to speak to students throughout the year through a partnership with the Higher Education Alliance of the United Nations.

=== Annual High School Mathematics Contest ===
For over 60 years Wilkes University has been the host of the Annual High School Mathematics Contest as sponsored by the Luzerne County Council of Teachers of Mathematics (LCCTM). Every year juniors and seniors from Luzerne County high schools come to Wilkes University to participate in the competition. The first-place winner in both the junior and senior divisions are awarded a full-tuition scholarship to Wilkes University.

=== ACM Intercollegiate Programming Contest ===
The Wilkes University Math and Computer Science Department hosts the Eastern Pennsylvania division of the Mid-Atlantic Region of the annual ACM International Collegiate Programming Contest. Wilkes University has been host to the event for the last 5 years. A total of 8 schools host teams in the Mid-Atlantic Region. The competition is sponsored by IBM and the contest challenges the participants knowledge and creativity in solving computer programming problems.

=== Annual Tom Bigler High School Journalism Conference ===
Annually, hundreds of Pennsylvania high school students attend this annual media oriented event. Each year features a notable keynote speaker, hands-on workshops in the areas of telecommunications, journalism and public relations and panel discussions and presentation from media professionals and personalities. A high school journalism contest and awards ceremony is also a main event.

=== Plays ===
The Wilkes University Theatre presents a full season of dramas and musicals on the main stage as well as a season of student produced black box productions at the Darte Center. The Division of Performing Arts presents a total of four shows annually at the Darte Center.

== Notable alumni ==
- Ann Bartuska, ecologist and biologist
- Jackson Berkey, classical music composer, pianist, and singer
- Marty Blake, former general manager of the Atlanta Hawks franchise
- Gabriel J. Campana, former mayor of Williamsport, Pennsylvania
- Catherine Chandler, poet
- Jesse Choper, constitutional law scholar and former dean of the UC Berkeley School of Law
- Rev. Robert Mary Clement, Catholic Archbishop and early LGBT liberation pioneer
- Catherine D. DeAngelis, first woman and the first pediatrician to become the editor of the Journal of the American Medical Association
- William R. Evanina, the NCIX, the National Counterintelligence Executive of the United States, and director of the U.S. National Counterintelligence and Security Center
- Kevin Gryboski, professional baseball player and college baseball coach
- Donora Hillard, author
- Lawrence Hilton-Jacobs, actor
- Marlon James, Jamaican novelist and winner of the 2015 Man Booker Prize
- Evana Manandhar, Miss Nepal 2015
- Eddie Day Pashinski, Pennsylvania House of Representatives member
- Steve Poleskie, artist and writer, Professor Emeritus at Cornell University
- Bo Ryan, college basketball coach
- Nisha Sharma, novelist
- Edward Weber, regional president at Toll Brothers Inc.
- Frank Zane, professional bodybuilder and three-time Mr. Olympia
