= Gandaki Boarding School =

- Nepal Adarsha Bidyashram

Location
- Lamachaur, Pokhara; Kaski District, Gandaki Province, 33700; Nepal; 28°3′58.65″N 83°14′36.72″E

Information
- School type: National School
- Motto: Knowledge Character Service
- Established: 11 June 1966 A.D 29 Jestha, 2023 B.S
- Founder: The United Mission to Nepal; The Shining Hospital; The Local Community
- Status: Open
- School district: Kaski
- Principal: Dr. Bishwo Udhir Poudel Gharti
- Staff: 150
- Faculty: 80
- Employees: 70
- Age: 9 to 19
- Enrollment: 1150
- Average class size: 42
- Language: English, Nepalese
- Hours in school day: 6-8
- Area: 35 acres (approx.)
- Houses: Four (Rapti, Seti, Karnali, Trishuli)
- Nickname: GBS
- Yearbook: The Gandaki
- Affiliations: School Leaving Certificate (Grade 10); Cambridge International Examinations (A-level) (Discontinued); Higher Secondary Education Board (10+2); Pokhara University
- Website: www.gbs.edu.np

Gandaki Boarding School (Nepali: गण्डकी आवासीय विध्यालय), often referred to as GBS, formerly known as Nepal Adarsha Bidyashram, is a model boarding school in Nepal, established on 11 June 1966 in the city of Pokhara, 200 kilometers west of Kathmandu. It was established as a result of the initiation of by three groups - The United Mission to Nepal, The Shining Hospital, and the local community.

== History ==
=== Establishment ===
It was established in 1966 on the banks of Seti River in Lamachaur, Pokhara. Initially the facilities were primitive, with all the thatch-roofed buildings made of mud and bamboo. There were 45 boarding students, supported by five teaching staff. It was designated as a co-educational regional school in 1986, with English as the medium of instruction, through an agreement between the Nepal government and the United Mission to Nepal.

Until 1991, courses were available from Grade 4 to Grade 10. Then it started offering 10+2 system under the Higher Secondary Education Board. GBS is the first of few schools to introduce 10+2 in Nepal. Prior to the commencement of 10+2 education, students were prepared for GCE O' level study for a number of years.

In 1999 Gandaki College of Engineering and Sciences (GCES), is affiliated to Pokhara University and offers Bachelor of Engineering (BE) courses in Software Engineering.

From 2010, it offers GCE A' Level Course under the Cambridge University, Cambridge, England.

=== Landmarks ===
- 11 June 1966 (30th Jestha, 2023): established as Nepali Adarsha Vidhyalaya for boys only.
- 1985: Changed to English medium school and renamed to Gandaki Boarding School (GBS).
- 1985: Recognized as the "Regional School" by the Government of Nepal.
- 1985: Adopted co-education system by enrolling girls.
- 1988: Gained a nationwide fame after Rajendra Gurung stood in SLC board first.
- 1991: Celebrated its Silver Jubilee.
- 1991: Started 10+2 in Science stream.
- 1999: Started Gandaki College of Engineering and Sciences (GCES).
- 2004: Awarded Birendra Vidhya National shield for SLC results with 4 boards, 66 distinctions, 100% first division among 113 candidates.
- 2010: Started GCE-A Level studies under the University of Cambridge, England.
- 2016: Celebrated its Golden Jubilee.

=== Notable alumni ===
- Amrit Gurung - singer, composer, musician, songwriter of Nepathya
- Kiran Gurung - Politician; Minister of Economic Affairs and Planning at Gandaki Province
- Saru Bhakta - Litterateur; Former member of Nepal Academy of Music and Drama
- Dr. Bigyan Babu Regmi - Economist and thought leader
- Sonie Rajbhandari - Miss Nepal 2nd Runner Up 2014 A.D. (2071 B.S.)
- Nisha Adhikari - Nepalese film actress and model. Miss Nepal International 2005 A.D.
- Sushant Subedi - Nepali Economist
- Usha Lamichhane - German Scientist

== Trivia ==
- The song "Kanchi Hai Kanchi" of Nepali movie Kanchhi was choreographed on the stage of Gymnasium Hall of GBS.
- The movie A Mero Hajur 2 was also filmed inside GBS.
