= Miss Nepal 2005 =

- Date: April 7, 2005
- Presenters: Malvika Subba.
- Venue: Birendra International Conference Convention Centre, Kathmandu
- Broadcaster: NTV
- Entrants: 19
- Winner: Sugarika KC; Lalitpur

Dabur Vatika Miss Nepal 2005, 11th Miss Nepal pageant took place at the Birendra International Conference Convention Centre on April 7, 2005, in Nepal. It was won by Sugarika KC, of Lalitpur.

The show was broadcast live by Nepal Television but suffered from minor technical glitches.

The winner, Sugarika KC, represented Nepal in the Miss World 2005 pageant in Sanya, China. The 1st runner up, Shavona Shrestha, represented Nepal in the Miss Earth 2005 and 2nd runner up Ayushma Pokharel represented Nepal at Miss Earth 2006 pageant in Manila, Philippines.

== Results ==
Color keys

- The contestant Won in an International pageant.
- The contestant was a Runner-up in an International pageant.
- The contestant was a Semi-Finalist in an International pageant.
- The contestant assumed another title.
- The contestant was not able to compete in an International pageant.
- The contestant did not place but won a Special Award in the pageant.
- The contestant did not place.

Final results	Contestant	International pageant	International Results
Miss Nepal 2005 (Winner)	(Nepal) Lalitpur - Sugarika KC	Miss World 2005	Unplaced
1st runner-up (Miss Earth Nepal 2005)	Kathmandu - Shavona Shrestha	Miss Earth 2005	Unplaced; Top 5 - People's Choice Award
2nd runner-up (Miss Earth Nepal 2006)	Kathmandu - Ayushma Pokharel	Miss Earth 2006	Unplaced
Miss International Nepal 2005	Kathmandu - Nisha Adhikari	Miss International 2005	Unplaced
World Miss University Nepal 2005	Kathmandu - Celina Gurung	World Miss University 2005	Unplaced
Top 5	Kathmandu – Bilena Malla		
Top 5	Kathmandu – Pratiksha Moktan		
Top 10	Kathmandu – Puja Shah		
Top 10	Kathmandu – Sweta Khadka		
Top 10	(Nepal) Lalitpur – Cherie Sophie Sherchan		
Top 10	(Nepal) Siraha – Soniya Giri		
Top 10	(Nepal) Syangja – Mohini Rana		

=== Sub-Titles ===
Award	Contestant
Meswak Miss Beautiful Smile	(Nepal) Syangja - Mohini Rana
The New Era Miss Personality	Kathmandu - Shavona Shrestha
Vatika Honey & Saffron soap Miss Best Complexion	Kathmandu - Sweta Khadka
Dabur Vatika Miss Beautiful Hair	(Nepal) Siraha - Soniya Giri
Kodak Miss Photogenic	(Nepal) Syangja - Mohini Rana
Real Miss Natural Talent	(Nepal) Lalitpur - Sugarika KC
Imagine Miss Best Dress	(Nepal) Lalitpur - Sugarika KC

== Contestants ==
No	Name	Age	Height	Representing	District	Placement
1	Baby Khawahang Subba	19	1.73 m (5 ft 8 in)	Baneshwor	Kathmandu District	
2	Sunita Sapkota	21	1.70 m (5 ft 7 in)	Jorpati	Kathmandu District	
3	Hema Shrestha	19	1.73 m (5 ft 8 in)	Bhaktapur	Bhaktapur District	
4	Pratiksha Moktan	22	1.76 m (5 ft 9 in)	Tahachal	Kathmandu District	Top 5
5	Mohini Rana	19	1.72 m (5 ft 8 in)	Syangja	Syangja District	Top 10, Miss Photogenic, Miss Beautiful Smile
6	Manju Lama	22	1.70 m (5 ft 7 in)	Nuwakot	Nuwakot District	
7	Chandra Gurung	21	1.71 m (5 ft 7 in)	Pokhara	Kaski District	
8	Samita Subba	19	1.70 m (5 ft 7 in)	Baluwatar	Kathmandu District	
9	Nirja Ranjit	20	1.72 m (5 ft 8 in)	Kathmandu	Kathmandu District	
10	Sushila Rana	20	1.71 m (5 ft 7 in)	Lalitpur	Lalitpur District	
11	Soniya Giri	20	1.75 m (5 ft 9 in)	Lahan	Siraha District	Top 10, Miss Beautiful Hair
12	Bilena Malla	20	1.81 m (5 ft 11 in)	Kathmandu	Kathmandu District	Top 5
13	Puja Shah	20	1.80 m (5 ft 11 in)	Kathmandu	Kathmandu District	Top 10
14	Anita Gurung	19	1.71 m (5 ft 7 in)	Kathmandu	Kathmandu District	
15	Shavona Shrestha	23	1.73 m (5 ft 8 in)	Kathmandu	Kathmandu District	1st Runner Up, Miss Personality
16	Ayushma Pokharel	22	1.79 m (5 ft 10 in)	Baneshwor	Kathmandu District	2nd Runner Up
17	Sweta Khadka	21	1.72 m (5 ft 8 in)	Baneshwor	Kathmandu District	Top 10, Miss Best Complexion
18	Sugarika K.C.	19	1.74 m (5 ft 9 in)	Lalitpur	Lalitpur District	WINNER, Miss Talent, Miss Best Dress
19	Cherie Sophie Sherchan	18	1.75 m (5 ft 9 in)	Sanepa	Lalitpur District	Top 10
