= Sipora Gurung =

- सिपोरा गुरुङ
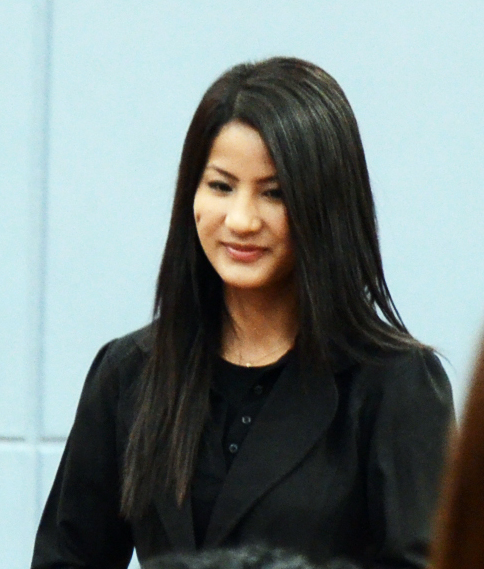
- Born: Pokhara, Nepal
- Citizenship: Nepal
- Notable work: National level volleyball player of Nepal; Miss Pokhara 2013; Miss Nepal 2013 3rd Runner Up
- Height: 5 ft 9.5 in (177 cm)

Sipora Gurung (Nepali: सिपोरा गुरुङ) is a Nepalese national women athlete, volleyball player, actress and beauty pageant winner. She was the top 5 finalist of Miss Nepal 2013 and winner of the Miss Talent title that year. She was born and raised in Pokhara. She is the youngest daughter of Moti Lal Gurung and Seti Ghising Gurung. She got recognition as the best volleyball player of Nepal at the age of 16. At the age of 13, she became the youngest player at the 10th South Asian Games held in Sri Lanka, where she won a bronze medal for Nepal. She sustained knee injury during a volleyball match at age 18 and has since been unable to play. She has been the Nepal champion of 200m and 400m (under 16). Her name means "beautiful bird" in Hebrew language.

== Education ==
She passed SLC (School Leaving Certificate) from Fishtail Higher Secondary Boarding School of Pokhara with an impressive score of 89%. She graduated high school, and is known to be diligent with her studies.

== Pageantry ==
=== Miss Nepal 2013 ===
In 2013, she competed in the Miss Nepal beauty pageant, held at the Nepal Academy Hall in Kathmandu. She successfully reached to top 5 and won the sub-title "The Hidden Treasure Miss Talent".

== Filmography ==
Key
†	Denotes films that have not yet been released
‡	Indicates documentary release

Year	Film	Role	Note
	Ghalek		Gurung film
2014	Yamphawati : The princess	Yamphawati	Charged 6 lakh for the movie
2026	Bhuimaanche		

== Awards and achievements ==
- Winner with best player in 83rd Chaitey Dashain Mela and 2nd Sunpadali Mahotsav, Arwabijaye-2 Kaski, 2062
- Runner up with the best player in Nepal Adharsha Cup, Kaski, 2062
- Winner in Kaski Jilla Iistariya Volleyball Pratiyogita, Kaski, 2004
- Second runner up in Pataley Channgo Cup, Kaski, 2062
- Winner in 200m, 400m, 4*100 relay, 4*400 relay, Best Athletes of the Tournament, with runner up in girls volleyball, 20th Birendrashield Pratigyogita, 2062, Kaski
- Runner-up in 3rd Aadarsha Cup, Kaski, 2063
- Winner with Best Spiker in 8th Pokhara Street Festival, Reban, Kaski, 2063
- Winner with Best Player in Myagdi Mahotsab and Maghey Sankrati Mela, Beni, 2063
- Runner up with Best Player of the Tournament in volleyball in Baglung Mahotsav, Baglung, 2063
- Winner in long jump, 400m and 4*100 relay in Pabson Sports Meet, Kaski, 2063
- Winner in 100m, 400m, long jump and volleyball in Zonal Open Sports Festival, Kaski, 2064
- Runner-up with Best Spiker in 9th Pokharastreet Festival, Kaski, 2007-2008
- Winner in 200m, 400m, 4*100 relay and 1st in volleyball in 11th Pabson Sports Meet, Kaski, 2008
- Runner up in volleyball and in football with Best Player of the Tournament, Republic Cup, Kaski, 2064
- Winner with the Rising Player of Nepal in 14th Women's and 24th Men's National Volleyball Competition, Hetauda, 2064
- Runner-up with Best Player of the Tournament, 2nd Chhantayal Cup open male and female volleyball tournament, Kathmandu, 2064
- Winner in 200m, 400m, long jump, 4*100 relay with Best Athletes of the Tournament in Bidyalaya Istariya Khelkud Pratiyogita, Kaski, 2064
- Runner up with Best Spiker in Dashain and Tihar Mela, Tilahar-6 dimuwa, 2064
- Winner with Best Player of the Tournament, Silver Jubilee Celebration, LSHSS, Kaski, 2064
- Winner in 200m, long jump, runner-up 400m and in volleyball, 1st Republican Sports Festival, Kaski, 2064
- 3rd runner Up in 3 km marathon, PTMA, Kaski, 2064
- Runner up in Girls' Interschool Volleyball Championship, Lamachaur, Kaski,2064
- Winner with best player in 4th Nepal Adarsha Cup, Kaski, 2064
- Winner in 200m, 400m, long jump and volleyball in School-Level Sportsmeet, Kaski, 2064
- Winner in 5th National Games, Kathmandu,2065
- Runner up with Best Server and Best Spiker in 3rd Dhorpatan Bluesky Cup IME Women's Volleyball Double League Championship, Kathmandu, 2065
- Winner in Girls Interschool Volleyball Championship, Lamachaur, Kaski, 2065
- Winner in 400m and long jump in 1st President Cup, Kaski, 2065
- Winner with Best Player of the Tournament in 3rd Grand National Republican Sports Festival, Palpa, 2065
- Runner up with Best Player of the Tournament and Best Spiker in 2nd Dhorpatan Bluesky Cup women's double league championship, Kathmandu, 2065
- Winner in Aakhil Cup Inter school volleyball championship, Kaski, 2065
- Winner in Long Jump and Volleyball 5th National Games, Zonal Championship, Kaski, 2065
- Winner in high jump, long jump and 2nd in 400m, Tamywan Rajya Istariya Athletics Pratiyogita, Kaski, 2065

2066 Winner in 8th girls 31st boys Interschool National Volleyball Championship, Kathmandu, 2066

- Runner up with Best Play of the Tournament in 4th Dhorpatan Bluesky Cup Women's Double League Championship, Kathmandu, 2066
- Winner in 200m, 400m, long jump, 4*100m relay and volleyball in Interschool Level Competition, Kaski, 2066
- Winner in 4*400m and runner up in Interschool level Boys' and Girls' Athletics Championship, Kaski, 2066
- Runner up in 1st Women's and Men's National League Championship, Kathmandu, 2066
- Winner in 200m, 400m, Runner-up in 4*100 m relay in 28th School Level National Athletics Championship, Kathmandu, 2066
- Second runner up in 10th South Asian Games, Sri Lanka, 2006
- Winner with Best Player of the Tournament in 7th Interschool National Girls Volleyball Championship, Kathmandu, 2064
- Second runner up in 5th Dhorpatanh Cup Blue Sky Women's Double League Championship, Kathmandu,2067
- Facilitated with the award Rastiya Bal Prativa Puraskar, 2065
