= Aastha Pokharel =

Nepalese fashion model (born 1991)

- आस्था पोखरेल
- Born: October 24, 1991 (age 35); Sinamangal, Kathmandu, Nepal
- Citizenship: Nepal
- Education: Bachelor of Science in Nursing
- Occupation: Fashion Model
- Years active: 2010–present
- Height: 1.77 m (5 ft 9 1/2 in)
- Title: Kingfisher Supermodels-2 Winner

Aastha Pokharel (Nepali: आस्था पोखरेल) is a Nepalese fashion model. She began her professional modeling career in the year 2011. The first big break Pokharel had was being featured on the cover and the editorial of Navyaata magazine cover in its March 2011 issue. Pokharel won Supermodel Nepal 2013 and became the 10th eliminated in the first season of Asia's Next Top Model held in Singapore. She was also a contestant in Miss Nepal 2014, where she was the third runner-up. She has been nominated in the India Times Most Desirable Women in 2014. She has been crowned as the winner of NDTV Good Times Kingfisher Supermodels 2. She has been chosen to feature in the Kingfisher Calendar 2015.
