= The British School, Kathmandu =

International school in Kathmandu, Bagmati, Nepal

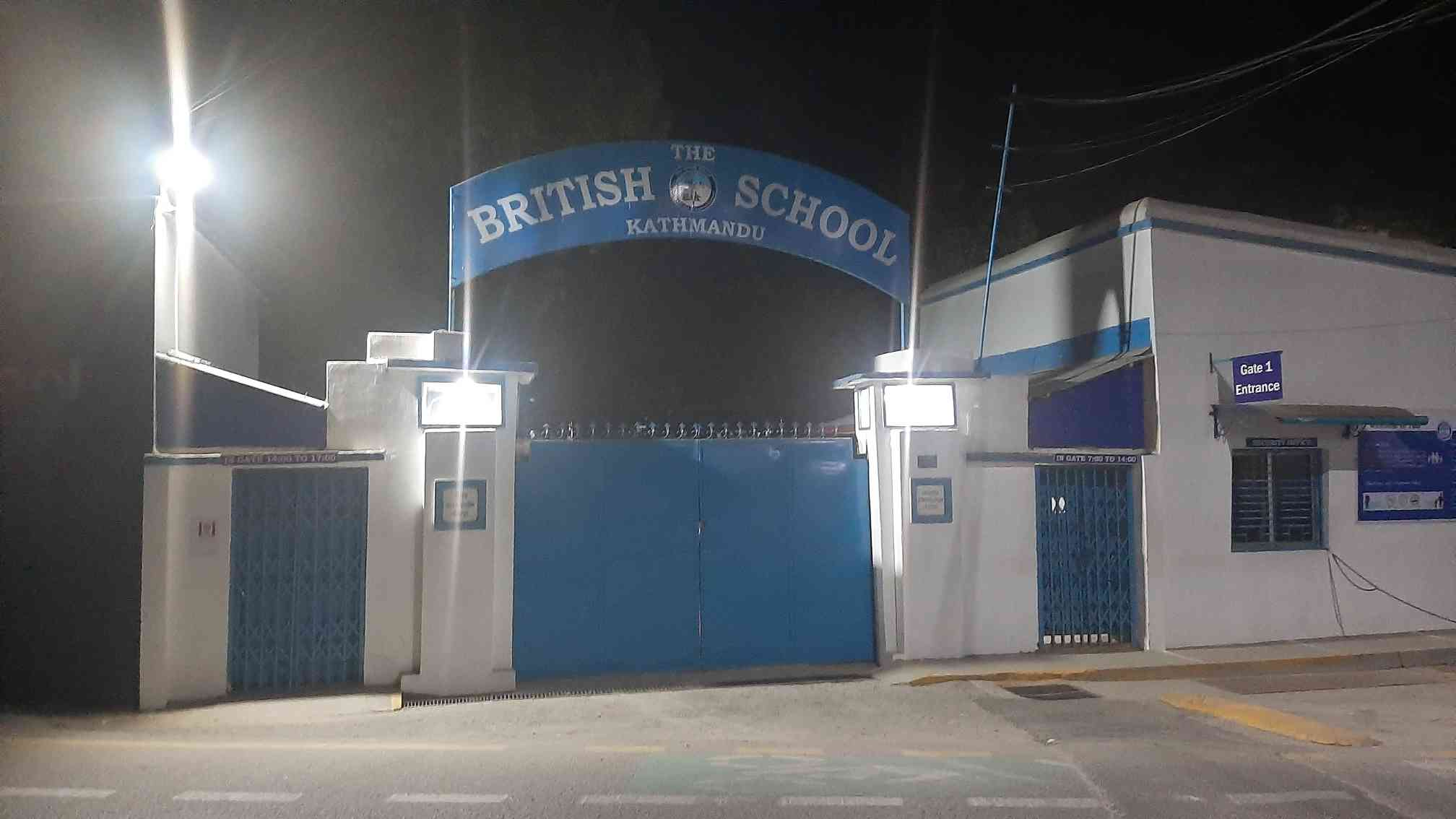
- Main Gate of The British School, Kathmandu
- Jhamsikhel; Kathmandu, Bagmati Province; Nepal

Information
- Other name: TBS
- Type: Not for Profit International School
- Motto: Excellence and Kindness at the top of the world
- Religious affiliation: None
- Established: 1966
- Principal: Caroline Drumm
- Years offered: Foundation 1 to Year 13
- Gender: Co-educational
- Age range: 3-18
- Language: English
- Houses: Dhaulagiri; Kangchenjunga; Annapurna; Makalu
- Colours: Blue,White
- Website: tbskathmandu.org

The British School is a private international school in Sanepa, Kathmandu, Bagmati Province, Nepal. It was established in 1966 to serve the British community, but is an inclusive school which has over 40 different nationalities and over 500 students. The British School offers education from foundation up to Year 13.

It delivers the English National Curriculum with full-time UK-recruited staff.

The school has its own artificial turf pitches, two multi-purpose sports areas, science laboratories, and two libraries, one for primary and one for secondary. It also has many small gardens, a duck pond, and parking for staff and students, including bike stands.

== History ==
The British School started in 1966 as a school for British and Commonwealth parents who wanted British-style education for their children. The school originally offered primary education. On 7 July 1967, the Government of Nepal gave official recognition to The British School and has since been supported by the British Embassy.

In 1997, the school expanded its curriculum to include Key Stage 3 students and they moved their campus to Jhamsikhel, Lalitpur.

In February 1998, the Prince of Wales opened the new campus.

In August 2004, the school expanded its curriculum to include A-Levels.

As of 2025, the school's most recent inspection was in 2022.
