= Evana Manandhar =

Nepalese businesswoman (born 1991)

- इभाना मानन्धर
- Born: 25 April 1991 (age 35)
- Education: Bachelors Degree in Business Administration
- Alma mater: Shuvatara School; Wilkes University
- Occupations: Media Personality & Social Activist
- Height: 5 ft 4 in (1.63 m)
- Beauty pageant titleholder
- Title: Miss Nepal 2015; Miss Intellectual; Miss Personality; Gosh Girl
- Major competition: Winner of Miss Nepal 2015
- Website: evanamanandhar.com

Evana Manandhar (Nepali: इभाना मानन्धर; born 25 April 1991) is a Nepalese businesswoman, model, and beauty pageant titleholder. She was awarded the title of Miss Nepal World 2015 and represented Nepal in Miss World 2015. Manandhar's predecessor to the crown was Subin Limbu.

== Education ==
Manandhar took her S.L.C (secondary board) examination at Shuvatara School. She has a bachelor's degree in business administration from Wilkes University, USA.

== Awards ==
Manandhar has also received the Dean's Excellence Award in Marketing and the International Student of the Year Award.

Awards and achievements
Preceded by Subin Limbu	Miss Nepal World; 2015	Succeeded by Asmi Shrestha
