= Rojisha Shahi =

Nepalese Psychologist (born 1993)

Rojisha Shahi Thakuri
- Born: Rojisha Shahi Thakuri; September 17, 1993 (age 33); Lalitpur, Nepal
- Height: 1.78 m (5 ft 10 in)
- Beauty pageant titleholder
- Title: Miss Nepal Earth 2013
- Hair color: Black
- Eye color: Brown
- Major competitions: Miss Nepal 2013 (1st Runner Up); Miss Earth 2013

Rojisha Shahi Thakuri (Nepali: रोजिशा शाही ठकुरी) is a Nepalese psychologist and beauty pageant titleholder. She has a Master’s Degree in Clinical Psychology from Tribhuvan University, specializing in cognitive behavioral therapy. She is the founder and Director of Healthy Minds, a mental health care center. Thakuri also collaborates as a psychologist at Paragon School, Kathmandu, holding clinical psychology sessions for both teenagers and adults, advocating through various media outlets.

She was the winner of Miss Nepal Earth 2013. She represented Nepal in Miss Earth 2013 in the Philippines.

Awards and achievements
Preceded by Nagma Shrestha	Miss Nepal Earth; 2013	Succeeded by Prinsha Shrestha
