= Maharajgunj =

- Neighbourhood
- Country: India
- State: Telangana
- District: Hyderabad
- Metro: Hyderabad

Government
  - Body: GHMC

Languages
  - Official: Telugu, Urdu
- Time zone: UTC+5:30 (IST)
- PIN: 500 012
- Vehicle registration: TG
- Lok Sabha constituency: Hyderabad
- Vidhan Sabha constituency: Goshamahal
- Planning agency: GHMC
- Website: telangana.gov.in

Maharajgunj is one of the old neighbourhoods in Hyderabad, Telangana, India.

== Commercial area ==
There are many shops which cater to all the needs of the people. Maharaj Gunj was the jagir village of family of Maharaj Chandulal who lived around 1860 AD and was peishakar and then PM of Nizams. Subsequently it was jagir village of maharaja Kishen pershad Bahadur, PM of Nizam VI. Nearby Kishan gunj is named after him. The banking firm Hiranand Ramsukh Inani family was designated by said jagirdar to be their treasurers for their jagir villages at maharaj Gunj, Hyderabad and Madnoor village, presently in Nizamabad Dist of T.S. A temple known as Sri Raghunath, Pandharinath, Hanuman Temple on a sprawling plot of land was constructed by merchants of Maharaj Gunj somewhere around 1850 AD. The grain merchants of maharaj Gunj purchased a land in 1971 AD and started Sri Savithri kanya unnatha Pathashala on this land.

== Transport ==
TSRTC buses connects Maharajgunj to all parts of the city.

The closest MMTS Train station is at Malakpet.
