= Shritima Shah =

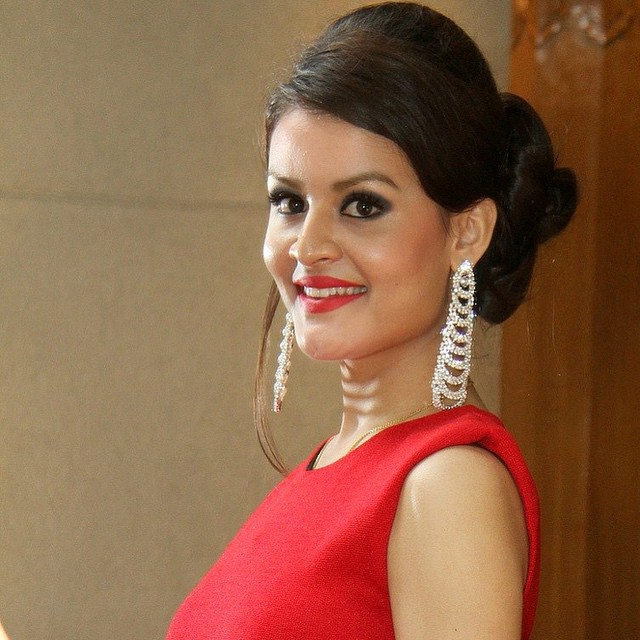
- Born: Kathmandu, Nepal
- Height: 1.74 m (5 ft 8 1/2 in)
- Beauty pageant titleholder
- Title: Miss Nepal International 2013
- Hair color: Brown
- Eye color: Hazel Brown
- Major competitions: Miss Nepal 2013; Miss International 2013

Shritima Shah (Nepali: श्रृतिमा शाह) is a Nepalese model and beauty pageant titleholder who won Miss Nepal International 2013. She represented her country at Miss International 2013. She has a master's degree in business administration from a Webster University. She is now a PhD scholar at the University of Kathmandu ResearchGate.

Awards and achievements
| Preceded by Subeksha Khadka (Nepal) | Miss Nepal International; 2013 | Succeeded by Sonie Rajbhandari (Nepal) |
