= Subin Limbu =

- सुविन लिम्बु
- Born: 1 March 1991 (age 35); Dharan, Nepal
- Education: Bachelor's degree in Business Administration
- Alma mater: Thames International College
- Notable work: Winner of Miss Nepal 2014
- Height: 1.78 m (5 ft 10 in)
- Title: Miss Nepal World 2014
- Term: 2014–2015
- Predecessor: Ishani Shrestha
- Successor: Evana Manandhar

Subin Limbu (Nepali: सुविन लिम्बु) is a Nepalese beauty pageant title holder who was crowned Miss Nepal in 2014 at an event held at Army Officers’ Club in Kathmandu. She was crowned by her predecessor Ishani Shrestha.

Limbu was selected from among 18 finalists. Pranayana KC was announced as Miss Personality, Soni Raj Bhandari as Miss Nepal International, and Prinsa Shrestha as Miss Nepal Earth.

Awards and achievements
Preceded by Ishani Shrestha	Miss Nepal World; 2014	Succeeded by Evana Manandhar
