= Nayabazar =

- Bazar
- Location in Sikkim, India Nayabazar (India)
- Coordinates: 27.1462°N 88.2789°E
- Country: India
- State: Sikkim
- District: Soreng

Population (2011)
  - Total: 1,235

Languages
  - Official: English; Nepali; Sikkimese; Lepcha
  - Additional official: Gurung; Limbu; Magar; Mukhia; Newari; Rai; Sherpa; Tamang
- Time zone: UTC+5:30 (IST)
- Vehicle registration: SK

Nayabazar is a in West Sikkim District of the Indian state of Sikkim. Covering an urban area of 0.12 kilometres (0.075 mi), it lies close to the confluence of Rangeet River and Rammam River some 109 kilometres (68 mi) by road from the state capital Gangtok and 25km from Darjeeling.

== Demographics ==
Nayabazar is a Notified Area city in district of West Sikkim, Sikkim. The Nayabazar Notified Area has population of 1,235 of which 656 are males while 579 are females as per report released by Census India 2011.

The population of children aged 0-6 is 136 which is 11.01 % of total population of Nayabazar (NA). In Nayabazar Notified Area, the female sex ratio is 883 against state average of 890. Moreover the child sex ratio in Nayabazar is around 1125 compared to Sikkim state average of 957. The literacy rate of Nayabazar city is 88.99 % higher than the state average of 81.42 %. In Nayabazar, male literacy is around 92.91 % while the female literacy rate is 84.42 %.

Nayabazar Notified Area has total administration over 252 houses to which it supplies basic amenities like water and sewerage. It is also authorize to build roads within Notified Area limits and impose taxes on properties coming under its jurisdiction.

=== Religion ===
Religious Demographic in NayaBazar Notified Area (2011)
1. Hinduism (80.2%)
2. Buddhism (8.66%)
3. Christianity (7.29%)
4. Islam (3.81%)
5. Others (0.00%)

=== Languages ===
Languages spoken in NayaBazar Notified Area (2011)
1. Nepali (51.3%)
2. Hindi (27.6%)
3. Bhojpuri (12.4%)
4. Urdu (3.40%)
5. Sherpa (1.37%)
6. Bengali (0.89%)
7. Marwari (0.80%)
8. Bhutia (0.64%)
9. Tamang (0.64%)
10. Ladakhi (0.32%)
11. Limbu (0.24%)
12. Lepcha (0.16%)
13. Others (0.86%)
