= Lamachaur =

Lamachaur लामाचौर
- Location in Nepal Lamachaur (Nepal)
- Coordinates: 28.2030323°N 84.0014496°E
- Country: Nepal
- Province: Gandaki
- City: Pokhara
- Time zone: +5:45 (Nepali Time)

Lamachaur (Nepali: लामाचौर) is name of place located in both ward number 16 & 19 of Pokhara Metropolitan City, Nepal. It is a residential area.

== Origin of the name ==
Lama means Long and Chaur means Ground.

== Educations ==
There are several governmental and private institutions in Lamachaur:

- IOE Paschimanchal Campus
- Indra Rajya Laxmi school
- Gandaki Boarding School

== Transportation ==
Privately run public transport system operating throughout the city, adjoining townships and nearby villages. Pokhara Mahanagar Bus (green, brown and blue buses), Bindabashini Samiti (blue buses), Lekhnath Bus Bebasaya Samiti (green and white buses) and Phewa Bus Bebasaya Samiti (mini micros) are public buses available in city. The public transport mainly consists of local and city buses, micros, micro-buses and metered-taxis.

== Communication ==
List of several Internet Service Providers (ISPs) in Lamachaur are:

- Worldlink
- Nepal Telecom
- Vianet
- Classic Tech
