= Ishani Shrestha =

Nepalese beauty pageant titleholder (born 1991)

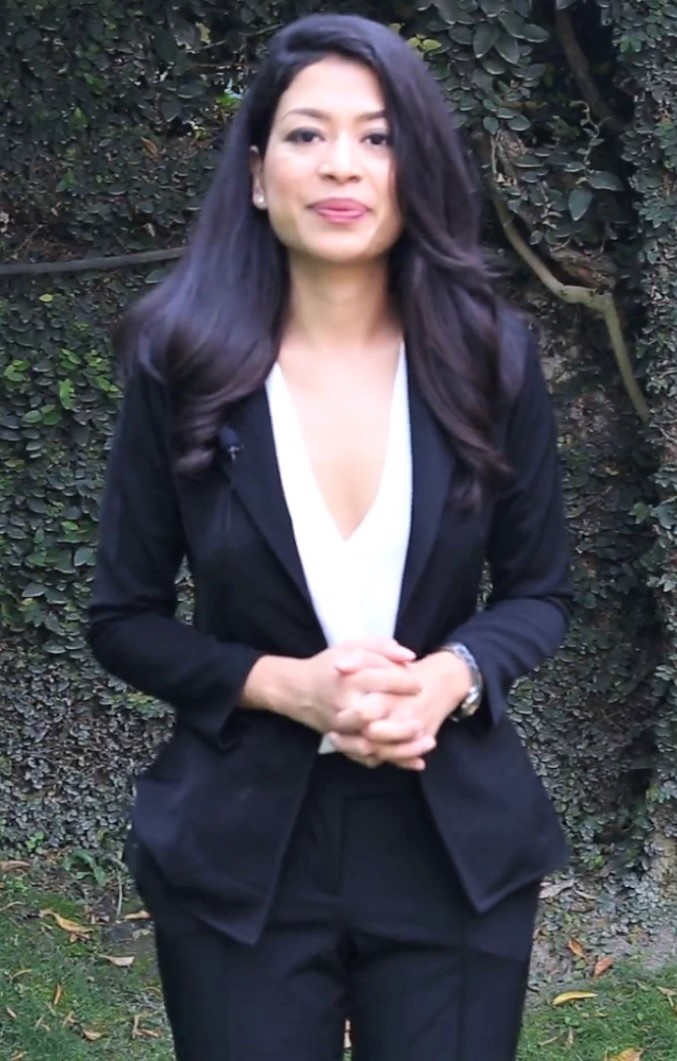
- Ishani Shrestha for United Nations Information Centre Nepal in 2018
- Born: Ishani Shrestha; 5 May 1991 (age 35); Kathmandu, Nepal
- Height: 1.73 m (5 ft 8 in)
- Beauty pageant titleholder
- Title: Miss Nepal 2013; Miss Nepal World 2013
- Hair color: Brown
- Eye color: Brown
- Major competitions: Miss Nepal 2013 (Winner); Miss World 2013 (Top 10); Beauty with a Purpose (Winner)
- Website: http://www.ishanishrestha.com

Ishani Shrestha (Nepali: इशानी श्रेष्ठ) (born 5 May 1991) is a Nepalese TV host, entrepreneur, model and beauty pageant titleholder who was crowned Miss Nepal World 2013. She represented Nepal at Miss World 2013 in Bali, Indonesia where she made history by placing in the top 10 and winning the Beauty with a Purpose title.

== Early life ==
Ishani Shrestha was born and raised in Nepal's capital Kathmandu. She has three younger siblings and attended the Triyog High School, in Kathmandu. She then emigrated to Boulder, Colorado and graduated from Fairview High School in 2009. She then attended the Business School at the University of Colorado.

== Education ==
Shrestha completed her primary education from Triyog High School, Kathmandu. She graduated from Fairview High School in Boulder, Colorado. She then attended the University of Colorado Business School. Shrestha tried studying Dentistry in People's Dental College, Kathmandu, but dropped out in her second year.

== Career ==
Shrestha is now a well known media personality, model, and entrepreneur. She also worked as Young Conservation Ambassador for World Wildlife Fund in Nepal.

=== Miss Nepal 2013 ===
Ishani came from Colorado, United States to compete in the Miss Nepal 2013 pageant where she won Miss Nepal World 2013 as well as the Miss Catwalk title.

=== Miss World 2013 ===
Ishani Shrestha was awarded the title of "Beauty with Purpose 2013". She was presented this award for her outstanding video presentation and social work in which she traveled to the rural places of Nepal to promote and raise awareness to people on Oral Hygiene. Ishani was one of the eleven contestants who received the opportunity to showcase their country's culture dance in Miss World 2013. She danced her heart out on the song, "Maiti Ghar" for the Dances of The World. In the contest, she was the second runner up for Multi Media in Miss World 2013 and also was finalists in several different competitions.

She also placed 2nd runner-up for the title, The Peoples' Champion (Multimedia) at Miss World 2013. Ishani Shrestha was a top 10 finalist of Miss World 2013; the furthest a Nepalese contestant had ever reached before. Shrestha was placed as a Top 5 finalist; however, the top five for Miss World 2013 had a twist where judges could then decide who could continue participating.

Awards and achievements
Preceded by Shristi Shrestha (Nepal)	Miss Nepal World; 2013	Succeeded by Subin Limbu (Nepal)
Preceded by Vanya Mishra (India)	Miss World, Beauty with a Purpose; 2013	Incumbent
