= Prinsha Shrestha =

Nepalese model (born 1992)

- Born: 11 September 1992 (age 34); Kathmandu, Nepal
- Height: 1.73 m (5 ft 8 in)
- Beauty pageant titleholder
- Title: Miss Nepal Earth 2014
- Hair color: Black
- Eye color: Brown
- Major competitions: Miss Nepal 2014 (dethroned); Miss Earth 2014

Prinsha Shrestha (born 11 September 1992) is a Nepalese model and beauty pageant titleholder who was the first runner-up of Miss Nepal 2014. She represented Nepal at Miss Earth 2014. Later, Shrestha participated in Miss Eco Queen 2015 without The Hidden Treasure's consent. On April 5, 2015, Shrestha's title was revoked due to her bad conduct in participating in an international pageant without The Hidden Treasure's knowledge.

Shrestha had also worn the official Miss Earth sash during Miss Eco Queen, which caused Miss Earth to state that they would take action against those delegates who were wearing the official Miss Earth sash at Miss Eco Queen 2015.

Awards and achievements
Preceded by Rojisha Shahi	Miss Nepal Earth; 2014	Succeeded by Dibyata Vaidya
