= Miss Nepal 2013 =

- Date: March 20, 2013
- Venue: Nepal Academy Hall, Kathmandu, Nepal
- Broadcaster: NTV
- Entrants: 18
- Winner: Ishani Shrestha; Kathmandu

Hidden Treasures Fanta Miss Nepal 2013, the 16th Miss Nepal beauty pageant, was held on March 20, 2013 at the Nepal Academy Hall in Kathmandu. Miss Nepal 2012 Shristi Shrestha crowned her successor Ishani Shrestha as Miss Nepal World 2013, she represented Nepal at Miss World 2013 pageant. Rojisha Shahi was chosen as Miss Nepal Earth 2013 and was sent to Miss Earth 2013 competition. Shritima Shah was chosen as Miss Nepal International 2013 and she represented Nepal for Miss International 2013 pageant.

According to the press conference the winner of Miss Nepal 2013 was selected as the brand ambassador of the drink Fanta, WWF Nepal for a year, and received Rs 50,000. All three winners received a Samsung phone and an apartment at Suncity apartments by Shangrila. The auditions of Miss Nepal were held in various cities including Pokhara, Butwal, Biratnagar, Narayangad and Kathmandu resulting in 18 chosen finalists from different cities. These 18 shortlisted young women aged 19 years and above competed for the main title and the pageant was telecast live on Nepal Television.

== Results ==
Color keys

- The contestant Won in an International pageant.
- The contestant was a Runner-up in an International pageant.
- The contestant was a Semi-Finalist in an International pageant.
- The contestant assumed another title.
- The contestant was not able to compete in an International pageant.
- The contestant did not place but won a Special Award in the pageant.
- The contestant did not place.

Final results	Contestant	International pageant	International Results
Miss Nepal 2013 (Winner)	Kathmandu - Ishani Shrestha	Miss World 2013	Top 10; Beauty with a Purpose; 2nd runner-up - Miss Multimedia
1st runner-up (Miss Earth Nepal 2013)	(Nepal) Dhapakhel - Rojisha Shahi	Miss Earth 2013	Unplaced; (silver) Best in Evening Gown; (silver) Most Child Friendly Challenge
2nd runner-up (Miss International Nepal 2013)	Kathmandu - Shritima Shah	Miss International 2013	Unplaced
Top 5	(Nepal) Kavre – Sumi Lama Moktan		
Top 5	(Nepal) Pokhara - Sipora Gurung		
Top 10	(Nepal) Jhapa - Ashmita Sitaula	Miss Grand International 2013	Unplaced
Top 10	(Nepal) Jhapa – Riju Shrestha		
Top 10	Kathmandu – Oshima Banu		
Top 10	(Nepal) Lalitpur – Pratima Giri		
Top 10	(Nepal) Pokhara – Rakshya Thapa		

=== Sub-titles ===
Award	Contestant
The Hidden Treasure Miss Talent	(Nepal) Pokhara – Sipora Gurung
Shree Ganapati Jewellers Miss Photogenic	Kathmandu - Shritima Shah
Professional Education Miss Personality	Kathmandu – Samikshya Shrestha
Sulux Miss Punctuality	(Nepal) Dharan - Meghna Shrestha
Annapurna Post Fanta Miss Bubbly	(Nepal) Jhapa - Ashmita Sitaula
Shoe Land Miss Best Walk	Kathmandu - Ishani Shrestha
Society Travels Miss Beautiful Smile	(Nepal) Jhapa - Riju Shrestha

== Contestants ==
Province No. 1 & Province No. 2 (Eastern & South-Eastern Regions)
No	Name	Age	Height	Representing	District	Placement	Notes
8	Meghna Shrestha	22	1.73 m (5 ft 8 in)	Dharan	Sunsari District	Miss Punctuality	
14	Ashmita Sitaula	20	1.73 m (5 ft 8 in)	Jhapa	Jhapa District	Top 10; Miss Bubbly	Later became Miss Grand Nepal 2013.
16	Renu Pokharel	20	1.73 m (5 ft 8 in)	Biratnagar	Morang District		
17	Aishwarya Upadhaya	19	1.70 m (5 ft 7 in)	Itahari	Sunsari District		
18	Riju Shrestha	22	1.75 m (5 ft 9 in)	Jhapa	Jhapa District	Top 10; Miss Beautiful Smile	Miss Global Nepal 2012 Top 5

Bagmati Province (Central Regions)
No	Name	Age	Height	Representing	District	Placement	Notes
1	Samikshya Shrestha	21	1.73 m (5 ft 8 in)	Kathmandu	Kathmandu District	Miss Personality	
6	Ishani Shrestha	21	1.73 m (5 ft 8 in)	Kathmandu	Kathmandu District	Winner; Miss Best Walk	Later placed 6th over all in Miss World 2013 pageant.
7	Sujata Balami	20	1.68 m (5 ft 6 in)	Hetauda	Makwanpur District		
9	Shritima Shah	21	1.73 m (5 ft 8 in)	Kathmandu	Kathmandu District	2nd Runner Up; Miss Photogenic	
10	Pratima Giri	20	1.70 m (5 ft 7 in)	Lalitpur	Lalitpur District	Top 10	
11	Oshima Banu	24	1.70 m (5 ft 7 in)	Kathmandu	Kathmandu District	Top 10	
13	Rojisha Shahi	19	1.78 m (5 ft 10 in)	Dhapakhel	Lalitpur District	1st Runner Up	
15	Sumi Lama	23	1.73 m (5 ft 8 in)	Kavre	Kavrepalanchok District	4th Runner Up	Miss Tamang 2012

Gandaki Province, Lumbini Province, Karnali Province & Sudurpashchim Province (Western, Southern & Far-Western Regions)
No	Name	Age	Height	Representing	District	Placement	Notes
2	Rachana Bharati	20	1.68 m (5 ft 6 in)	Mahendranagar	Kanchanpur District		
3	Sipora Gurung	19	1.75 m (5 ft 9 in)	Pokhara	Kaski District	Top 5 Miss Talent	National level volley player for Nepal Volleyball Association Team.
4	Bindu KC	23	1.73 m (5 ft 8 in)	Syangja	Syangja District		
5	Maya Sawad	23	1.70 m (5 ft 7 in)	Dhangadhi	Kailali District		
12	Rakshya Thapa	22	1.73 m (5 ft 8 in)	Pokhara	Kaski District	Top 10	

== Previous Experience ==
- (#3) Sipora Gurung is a National level volleyball player.
- (#4) Bindu KC previously competed in Miss Nepal 2010.
- (#8) Meghna Shrestha was previously 1st runner up to Miss Teen College 2009.
- (#10) Pratima Giri worked as VJ at Play it On show on the NTV PLUS.
- (#11) Oshima Banu won Face of the Classic Diamond for Timeless Paragon Jewellery 2012.
- (#12) Rakshya Thapa was previously Miss Siglakas 2010 and 1st runner up to Miss VMUF 2009.
- (#14) Ashmita Sitoula was previously Top 5 in Miss Teen Nepal 2011.
- (#15) Sumi Moktan won Miss Tamang 2012.
- (#18) Riju Shrestha was Top 5 in Miss Nepal Global 2012.
