= Miss Nepal 2015 =

- Date: April 18, 2015
- Venue: Hotel Annapurna, Kathmandu, Nepal
- Broadcaster: NTV & NTV PLUS
- Entrants: 19
- Winner: Evana Manandhar; Pennsylvania

Hidden Treasures Fanta Miss Nepal 2015, the 18th annual Miss Nepal beauty pageant was held on April 18 at the Hotel Annapurna in Kathmandu. Miss Nepal 2014 Subin Limbu crowned her successor Evana Manandhar as Miss Nepal World 2015, who represented Nepal at the Miss World 2015. Similarly, Dibyata Vaidya was declared the 1st runner up as Miss Nepal Earth 2015 sent to Miss Earth 2015 and Medha Koirala was the 2nd runner up as Miss Nepal International 2015 sent to Miss International 2015.

The winner of Miss Nepal 2015 was selected as the brand ambassador of drink, Fanta; WWF Nepal for a year and won Rs. 100,000. The auditions of Miss Nepal were held in various regional contests like Biratnagar, Birgunj, Chitwan, Pokhara, Butwal & Kathmandu where all the selected candidates made it to top 19 finalists. All three winners also got a Gionee phone and an apartment at Suncity apartments by Shangrila.

The 19 shortlisted young women aged 19 years and above competed for the main title and the pageant was live telecasted on NTV and NTV PLUS.

== Results ==
Color keys

- The contestant Won in an International pageant.
- The contestant was a Runner-up in an International pageant.
- The contestant was a Semi-Finalist in an International pageant.
- The contestant assumed another title.
- The contestant was not able to compete in an International pageant.
- The contestant did not place but won a Special Award in the pageant.
- The contestant did not place.

Final results	Contestant	International pageant	International Results
Miss Nepal 2015 (Winner)	Pennsylvania - Evana Manandhar	Miss World 2015	Unplaced; Top 10 - Beauty with a Purpose; Top 7 - Dances of the World
1st runner-up (Miss Earth Nepal 2015)	Kathmandu - Dibyata Vaidya	Miss Earth 2015	Unplaced
2nd runner-up (Miss International Nepal 2015)	(Nepal) Biratnagar - Medha Koirala	Miss International 2015	Unplaced
Top 5	(Nepal) Dharan – Nishma Chaudhary		
Top 5	Kathmandu - Sristee Bhattarai		
Top 10	(Nepal) Dharan - Asina Poudel		
Top 10	(United Kingdom) Greater London – Durga Gurung		
Top 10	(United Kingdom) Greater London – Nuning Limbu		
Top 10	(Nepal) Lalitpur – Rebika Chhetri		
Top 10	(Nepal) Lalitpur – Sonu Thapa Magar		

=== Sub-titles ===
Award	Contestant
The Kathmandu Post Miss Intellect	Pennsylvania – Evana Manandhar
Fanta Miss Bubbly	(Nepal) Dharan - Nishma Chaudhary
Hyundai Miss Friendship	(Nepal) Lalitpur – Sonu Thapa Magar
Berger Miss Talent	(Nepal) Tanahu - Puja Shrestha
Shree Ganapati Jewellers Miss Photogenic	Kathmandu – Dibyata Vaidya
Alfa Beta Miss Scholar of the Year	(Nepal) Chitwan - Sudipa Pathak
Miss GOSH Girl 2015	Pennsylvania - Evana Manandhar
Miss Popular	(United Kingdom) Greater London - Nuning Limbu
Miss Personality	Pennsylvania - Evana Manandhar
Beauty with a Purpose	(Nepal) Lalitpur - Rebika Chhetri
Miss Best Complexion	(Nepal) Dharan - Nishma Chaudhary

== Contestants ==
Province No. 1 & Province No. 2
No	Name	Age	Height	Representing	District	Placement	Notes
1	Medha Koirala	20	1.74 m (5 ft 9 in)	Biratnagar	Morang District	2nd Runner Up	
5	Priya Rani Lama	24	1.72 m (5 ft 8 in)	Dharan	Sunsari District		Miss Purwanchal 2010 1st Runner Up
9	Anu Khadka	22	1.73 m (5 ft 8 in)	Jhapa	Jhapa District		
11	Nishma Choudhary	21	1.74 m (5 ft 9 in)	Dharan	Sunsari District	Top 5 Miss Best Complexion; Miss Bubbly	
16	Asina Poudel	21	1.79 m (5 ft 10 in)	Dharan	Sunsari District	Top 10	

Bagmati Province
No	Name	Age	Height	Representing	District	Placement	Notes
2	Rebika Chettri	20	1.69 m (5 ft 7 in)	Lalitpur	Lalitpur District	Top 10; Beauty with a Purpose	
3	Sristee Bhattarai	21	1.71 m (5 ft 7 in)	Kathmandu	Kathmandu District	Top 5	
8	Sonu Thapa Magar	22	1.73 m (5 ft 8 in)	Lalitpur	Lalitpur District	Top 10; Miss Friendship	
10	Sudipa Pathak	23	1.76 m (5 ft 9 in)	Chitwan	Chitwan District	Miss Best Scholar of the Year	
12	Dibyata Vaidya	23	1.74 m (5 ft 9 in)	Kathmandu	Kathmandu District	1st Runner Up; Miss Photogenic	1st Runner Up of Miss Global International 2012
13	Prashamsa Parajuli	22	1.67 m (5 ft 6 in)	Chitwan	Chitwan District		
17	Kripa Neupane	23	1.72 m (5 ft 8 in)	Kathmandu	Kathmandu District		
18	Shreeya Poudel	22	1.69 m (5 ft 7 in)	Kathmandu	Kathmandu District		Miss Teen Nepal 2009

Gandaki Province & Lumbini Province
No	Name	Age	Height	Representing	District	Placement	Notes
4	Puja Shrestha	22	1.80 m (5 ft 11 in)	Tanahu	Tanahun District	Miss Talent	Top 10 Face of Diamond 2014
6	Sujita Khanal	21	1.71 m (5 ft 7 in)	Lumbini	Rupandehi District		
7	Rita K.C.	20	1.69 m (5 ft 7 in)	Pokhara	Kaski District		

International
No	Name	Age	Height	Representing	District	Placement	Notes
14	Evana Manandhar	23	1.67 m (5 ft 6 in)	Nepalese American	Pennsylvania	Winner; Miss Personality; Miss GOSH Girl; Miss Intellectual	
15	Durga Gurung	23	1.69 m (5 ft 7 in)	British Nepalese	Greater London	Top 10	Miss UK Nepal 2012
19	Nuning Limbu	22	1.68 m (5 ft 6 in)	British Nepalese	Greater London	Top 10; Miss Popular	
