= Sanepa =

Place in Lalitpur District of Nepal

Sanepa is a place in Lalitpur District of Nepal. It borders Jhamsikhel, Balkhu, Kupondole and Teku.

It is popular as a place for tourists to stay, and many restaurants and bars are situated here. In view of its popularity with tourists, it is also known as the second Thamel; Jhamsikhel is also referred to as Jhamel (from Thamel).

The head party office of the Nepali Congress is situated at Sanepa, as is the residence of COAS (Chief of the Army Staff). The British School, Primary wing of Graded English Medium School, and various international non-government organizations along with many embassies for Nepal are located here.
