= Uray (caste group) =

A Newar Hindu merchant caste of Kathmandu in Nepal

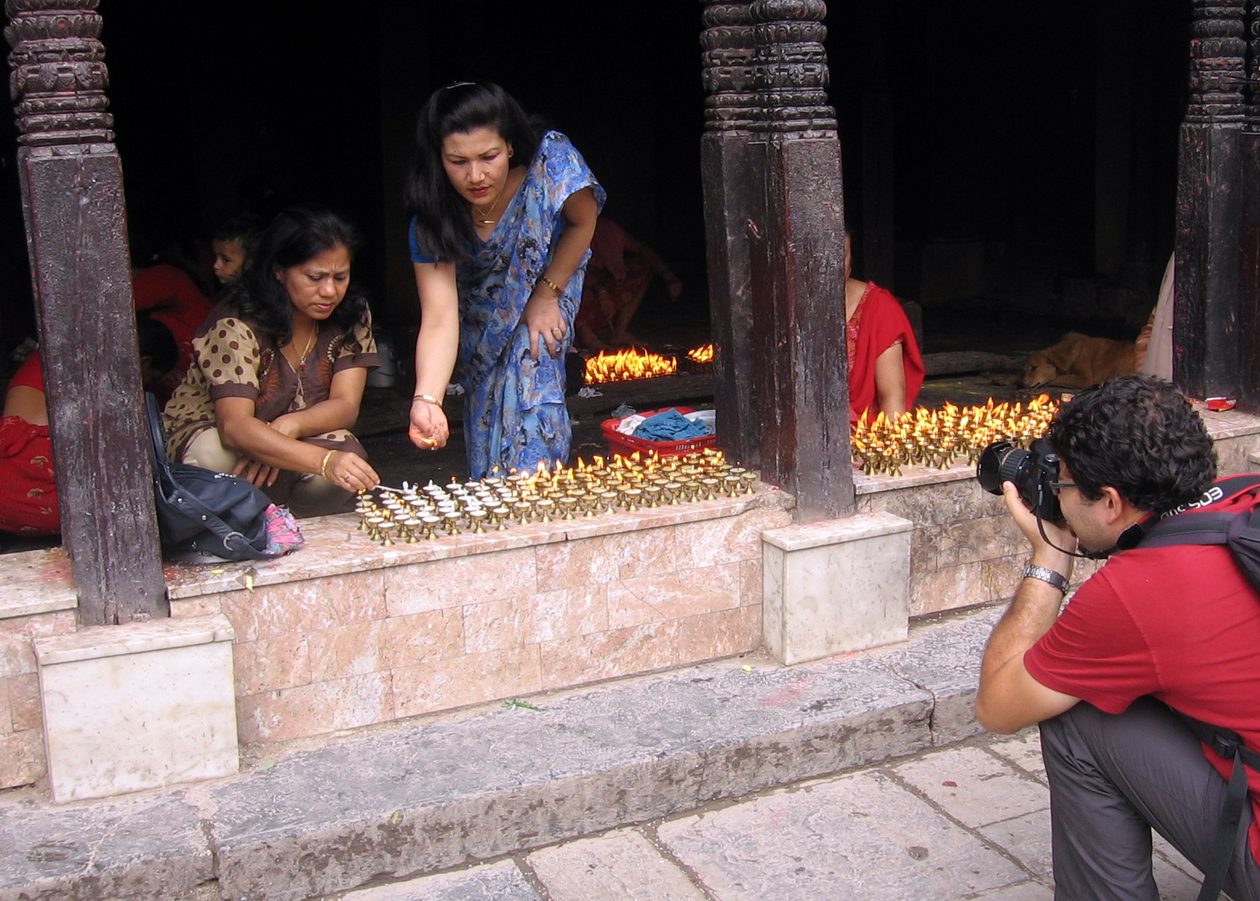
Lighting butter lamps at Swayambhu, Kathmandu

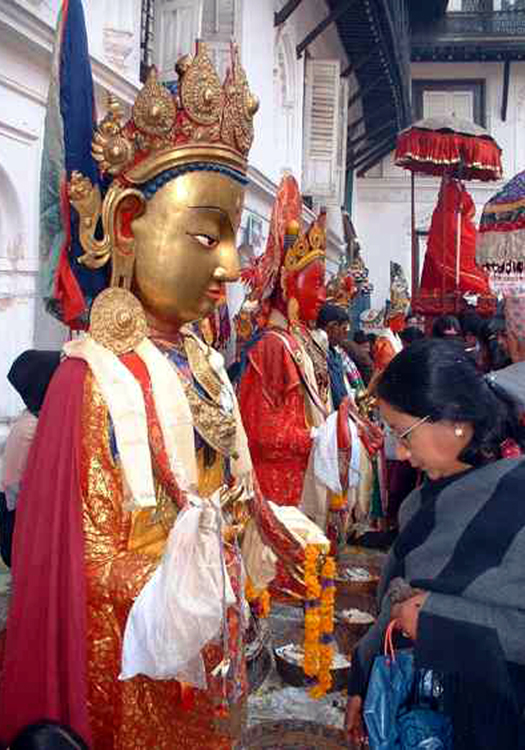
Samyak at Kathmandu Durbar Square

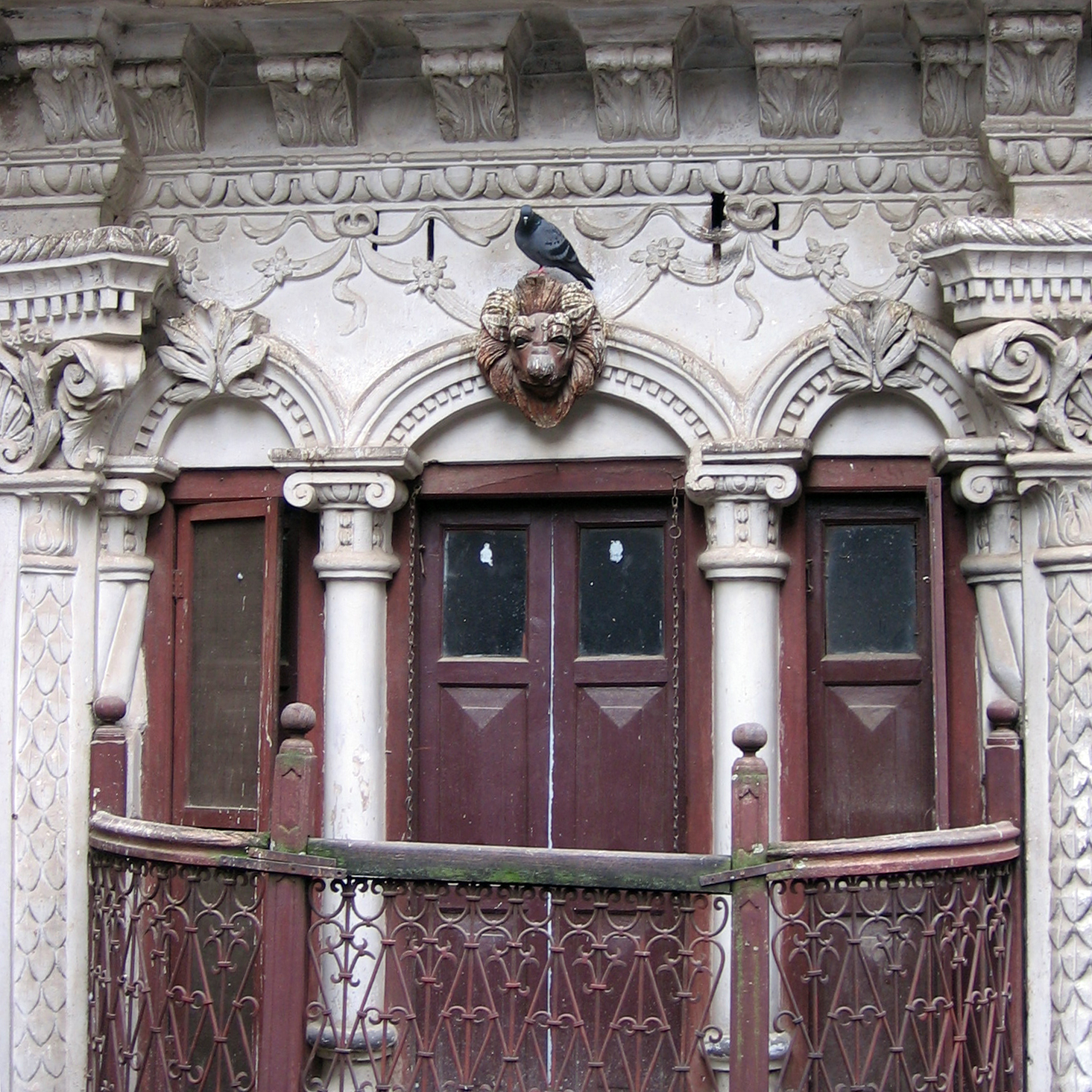
A Uray family house, Kathmandu

Urāy (Nepali: उरे) (alternative names: Udaaya, Udās) is a Newar Buddhist merchant caste of Kathmandu in Nepal. They are a prominent community in the business and cultural life of Kathmandu. Urays have played key roles in the development of trade, industry, art, architecture, literature and Buddhism in Nepal and the Himalayan region.

The name Uray is said to have been derived from the Sanskrit term "upāsaka" which means "devout layman". The Uray follow Newar Buddhism and speak the Newar language as their mother tongue. They are believers in non-violence in personal relations and ritual practices.

== History ==
An early reference to the Uray is contained in a 17th-century journal kept at the Buddhist monastic courtyard of Jana Baha, Kathmandu. Dated Nepal Sambat 763 (1643 AD), the journal entry states that King Laxmi Narsingh Malla has asked all the Urays to attend a religious service at Asan.

Urays are also known for their history as traders on the Silk Road. Operating out of business houses in Lhasa, Tibet and Kolkata, India, they were key players in the traditional Tibet trade for centuries. These merchants were known as the Lhasa Newar.

== Subcastes ==
The Uray are divided into nine subcastes who use the following surnames. Each group is associated with a traditional occupation according to the division of labor instituted in the past.

- Tuladhar (merchant)
- * Sthapit (engineer)
- Tamrakar of Kathmandu only (worker in copper, gold, silver and brass)
- Kansakar (worker in bronze, brass and copper)
- Sikhrākār (roofer)
- Bania (herbalist)
- Sindurākār (wood carver)
- Shilākār of Kathmandu only (stone carver)
- Selālik (confectioner)

== Cultural life ==
Samyak is the greatest Newar Buddhist festival. The ceremony in Kathmandu is held once every 12 years and is spread over three days. On the occasion, large images of Dīpankara Buddha are exhibited at Kathmandu Durbar Square and Swayambhu. Alms are distributed to priests during the ceremony which is attended by the king.

During Samyak, each Uray group performs a task that has been assigned by tradition. The Tuladhars of Asan sew and distribute leaf plates, Tuladhars of Nyata cook and serve rice, Sthapits build the wooden viewing stand, Tamrakars play the trumpet, Kansakars prepare and serve five types of foods, Sikhrakars supply clay pots (discontinued since 1980), Banias serve a sweet drink and Selaliks serve confections.

Gunlā Bājan is Buddhist devotional music played during the month of Gunlā which is considered holy by Newar Buddhists. Gunla is the 10th month in the Nepal Era calendar and corresponds to August. All Uray groups have a Gunla Bajan band which makes a daily pilgrimage to Swayambhu during the sacred month.

== Social life ==
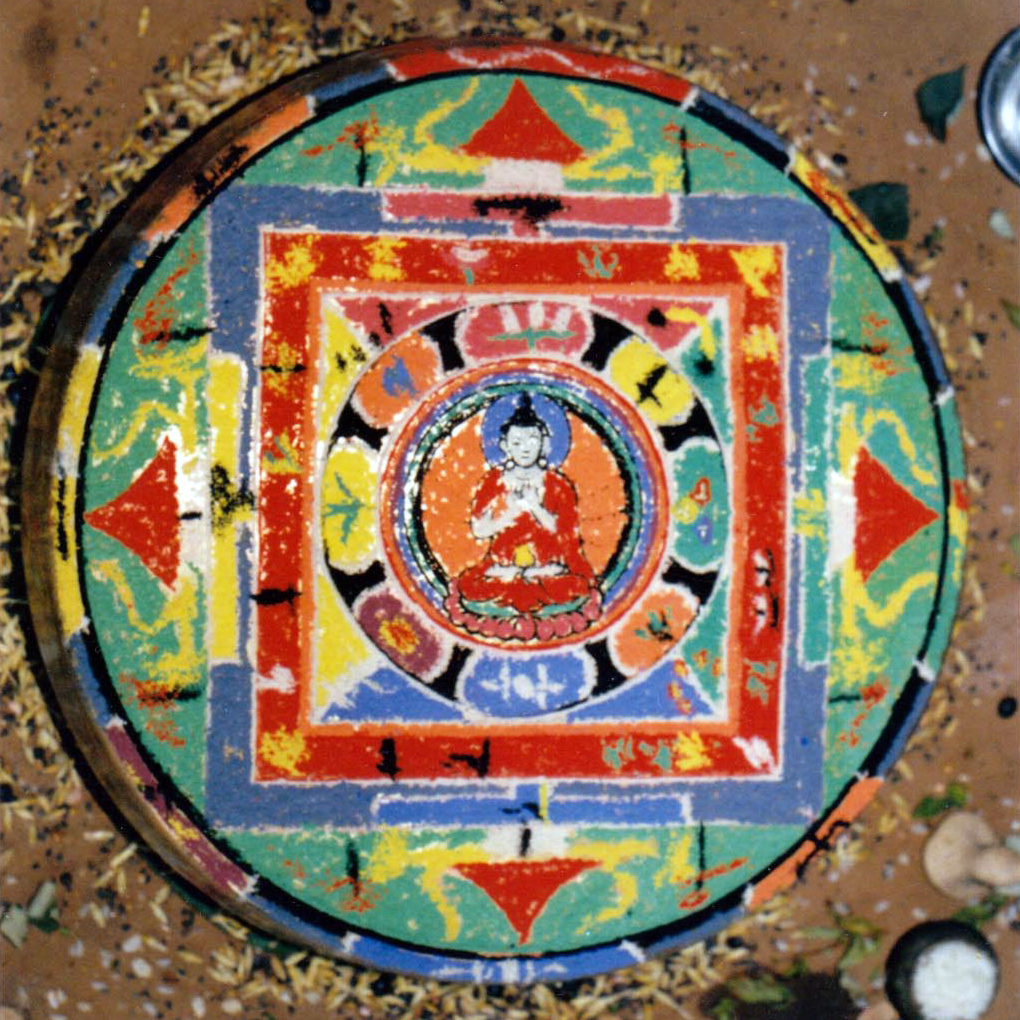
Mandala made on the third day after death as part of the death rituals

Each Uray group has its own lineage deity known as Digu Dyah (दिगु द्यः). Every year, members gather at the shrine, which is usually located on an open field on the outskirts of the city, and make offerings to the deity. The ritual is known as Depujā.

Urays have two types of funeral societies, Sī Guthi (सी गुथि) and Sanān Guthi (सनां गुथि). The Si Guthi performs the cremation too while the Sanan Guthi only takes part in the funeral procession, and the work of cremation is outsourced to another society.

== Udaaya Museum ==
The Udaaya Museum containing miniature dioramas illustrating the traditional occupations and cultural performances of the nine subcastes has opened. It also contains historical and contemporary photographs and tools used by the artisans. The museum is located in a traditional house at Asan, Kathmandu.

== Honors ==
The Postal Services Department of the Nepal government has honored five Urays by issuing commemorative postage stamps for their contribution to national development—poet Chittadhar Hridaya (formerly Chittadhar Tuladhar) in 1992, Buddhist monk and patriarch of Nepal Pragyananda Mahasthavir (formerly Kul Man Singh Tuladhar) in 2001, social worker Daya Bir Singh Kansakar in 2002 and transportation pioneers Karuna Ratna Tuladhar and Lupau Ratna Tuladhar in 2012.

== See also ==
- Buddhism in Nepal
- Newar Buddhism
- Gunla Bajan music
- Kumha Pyakhan dance
- Traditional Newar clothing
