= Dharma Ratna Yami =

Nepalese activist and writer (1915- 1975)

- धर्मरत्न यमी
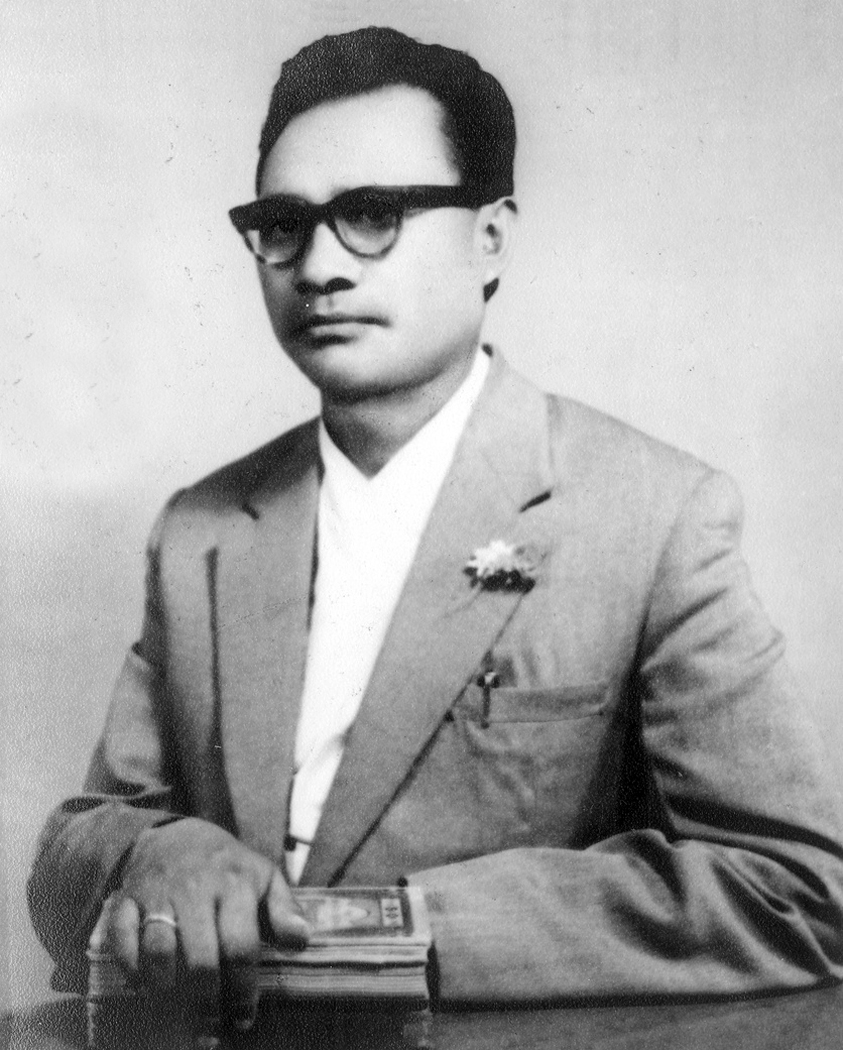
- Born: Dharma Ratna Tuladhar; 18 August 1915; Asan, Kathmandu, Nepal
- Died: 10 September 1975 (aged 60)
- Occupations: Activist, writer
- Notable work: Jagat Jyoti (Nepali book); Sandeyā Lisah (Newari epic)
- Spouses: Heera Devi Kansakar (1945 -1968; her death); Sabitri Devi Dahal (m. 1969)
- Children: Hisila Yami
- Parents: Bhawani Ratna (father); Devi Maya (mother)
- Relatives: Baburam Bhattarai (son-in-law)

Dharma Ratna Tuladhar, popularly known as Dharma Ratna Yami (Nepali: धर्मरत्न यमी) was a Nepalese government deputy minister, activist and Newa language writer

While serving eighteen years jail term, he changed his surname from Tuladhar to Yami (meaning an inhabitant of Kathmandu in Nepal Bhasa) and identified himself as Newa. He in the jail to unite and organized communities against the Rana rulers.

== Early life ==
Yami was born to father Bhawani Ratna, son of rich business merchant Late Ratna Das Tuladhar and Mother Devi Maya Tuladhar at Asan Kamalachhi (Newar: कमलाछि), Kathmandu. His was an affluent merchant family which was made penniless after the Rana regime confiscated their property. Yami was schooled at home. In 1930, he traveled to Lhasa and worked in the business house of Dharma Man Tuladhar. In Tibet, he came in contact with Mahapandit Rahul Sankrityayan; and under his influence and inspiration, he studied books on various subjects and began writing himself. B. R. Ambedkar was a good friend of late Dharma Ratna Yami. He used to be invited as the chief guest in Ambedkar's programs in India.

== Political activities and imprisonment ==
Returning to Kathmandu in 1937, he joined the democracy movement against the autocratic Rana regime. He was arrested in 1940 and sentenced to 18 years in prison and his property was impounded. Following his release after serving five years, he married Heera Devi Kansakar. On 15 August 1947, both Yami and his wife were arrested for organizing a meeting to mark India's independence from Britain. Yami's wife was freed after a few days while he remained in jail for six more months.

In 1948, he became a founder member of the Nepal Democratic Congress Party which was for overthrowing the Rana regime by any means, including armed uprising. In 1950, it combined with the Nepali National Congress and became the Nepali Congress which launched an armed struggle against the Ranas. Yami was arrested again and spent 16 months behind bars. He was freed in February 1951 after the Rana regime was abolished and democracy established in Nepal.

In November 1951, the first government in Nepal led by a commoner prime minister was formed, and Yami was appointed Deputy Forest Minister by Prime Minister Matrika Prasad Koirala. According to Koirala, Yami was inducted into the cabinet at the insistence of King Tribhuvan because of his experience in Tibet and social work, and that somebody from the Buddhist community of the Kathmandu Valley should be included in it.

Following the political changes in 1960 when parliament was dissolved and political parties were banned, he was put under house arrest for a few months at Shree Mahal. Yami was nominated to the Rastriya Panchayat (legislature) in 1962.

== Social activist ==
Yami was an outspoken nonconformist and challenged the social norms of the day like untouchability. He demanded in Parliament that laws related to caste and ethnicity be scrapped, but the proposal was rejected. In 1969, a year after his wife died, he remarried outside his caste a Bahun woman named Sabitri Devi Dahal. He also hired a woman from a so-called untouchable caste as a cook in his kitchen, an unthinkable act in those days. His radical social and political views have led his contemporaries like missionary Father Marshall D. Moran, SJ to describe him as the most informative and interesting person in Kathmandu. Yami died in Kathmandu in 1975 at the age of 60.

== Publications ==
Yami was a prolific and multilingual writer and has published 21 books including novels, epics and an anthology of poems in Nepal Bhasa, Nepali, English and Hindi. He has been jailed for his writings because the government found them subversive.

=== Nepal Bhasa ===
- Sandeyā Lisah (Newar: सँदेया लिस, lit. 'Tibet's reply') is an epic about an unfulfilled love affair between a Newar merchant in Lhasa and a Tibetan girl. Yami wrote it when he was in prison for the third time in 1950, and it was first published in 1952. A Nepali translation by Durga Lal Shrestha appeared in 2013 under the title Lhasa Bolchhe.
- Biswantarayā Machā Dān (transl. Biswantara gives away his children), an epic based on the Vessantara Jataka, a Buddhist tale, published in 1952.
- Arhat Nanda, an epic, published in 1953.
- Lithu ("Second wife"), a novel, published in 1958.
- Bhrikuti, a novel based on the story of a seventh-century Nepalese princess named Bhrikuti who married Tibetan king Songtsän Gampo. It was awarded the Shrestha Sirapa in 1959.
- Ang Lhāmo, a novel that recounts the saga of a Tibetan girl named Ang Lhamo against a backdrop of the Chinese entry into Tibet in the early 1950s. The first edition published in 1970 by Pasa Muna was banned by the Nepalese government. A second edition appeared in 1992, published by Paleswan Pithana, Kathmandu.

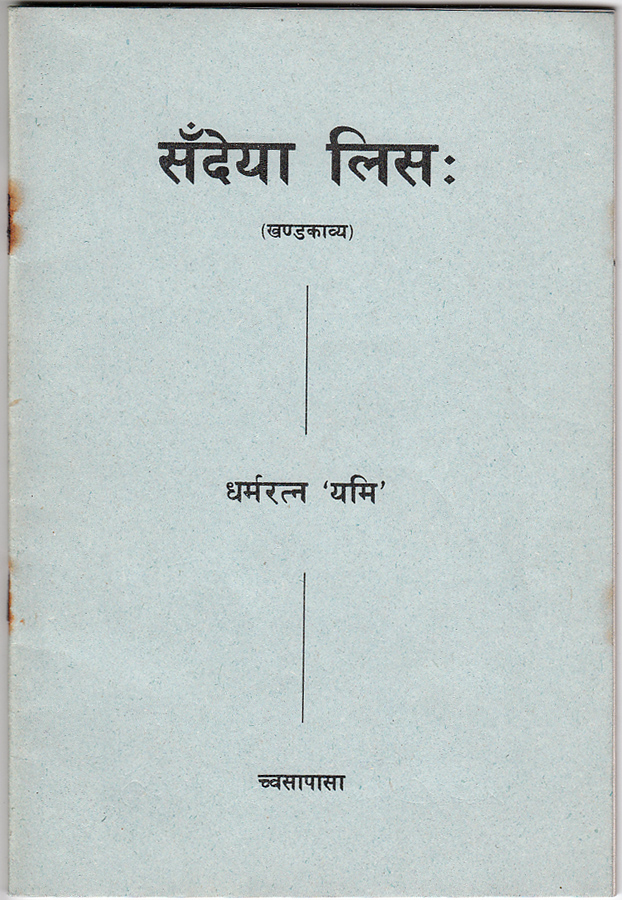
Sandeyā Lisah

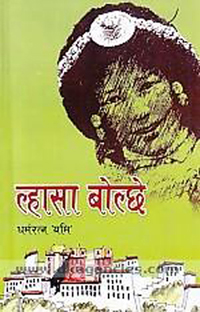
Lhasa Bolchhe

=== Nepali ===
- Jagatjyoti, an epic based on the Buddha's life story.
- Nepāl kā Kurā, a critical history of Nepal.
- Bauddha Darshan ko Ruprekhā, a work on Buddhist philosophy.
- Gāndhi Gaurav, memoirs.
