= Bhakta Bir Singh Tuladhar =

Nepalese merchant

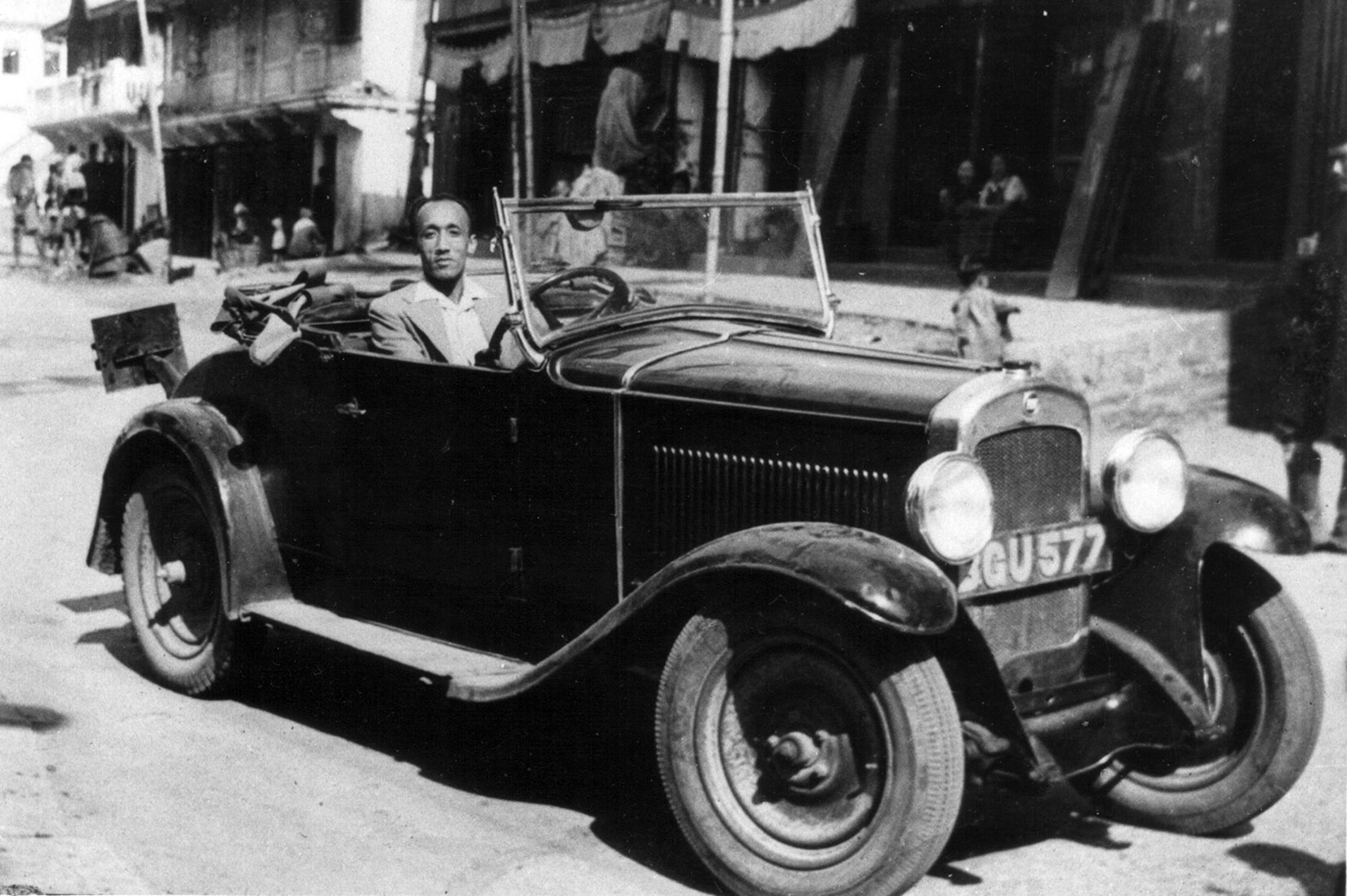
Bhakta Bir Singh in a Fiat in Kalimpong, ca 1949.

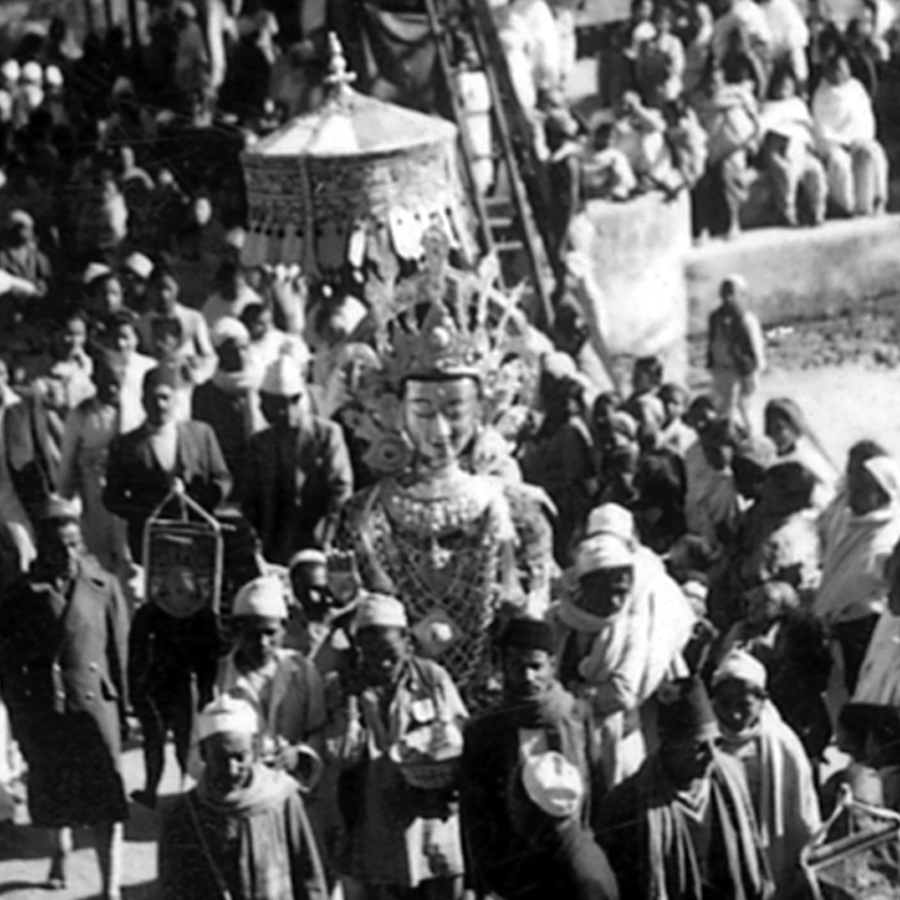
Image of Dipankar Buddha being brought to Bhuikhel, Kathmandu for Samyak in 1952.

Bhakta Bir Singh Tuladhar (Nepali: भक्तवीरसिंह तुलाधर) (1912 - 1989) was a Nepalese merchant and philanthropist. He held a special Samyak (सम्यक) ceremony in 1952 when the country was passing through a political crisis, and the Buddhist alms-giving festival became of crucial importance for both sides in the power struggle.

== Business in Tibet ==
Bhakta Bir Singh was born to father Samyak Singh (also known as Samek Ratna) and mother Sānu Māyā Tuladhar in Kathmandu. The family home was located at Nhyokhā (न्ह्योखा), a neighborhood in the historical section of Kathmandu. He was married to Laxmi Hirā Kansakar, and was popularly known as Bhagat Sāhu.

The Tuladhars owned a business house in Lhasa, and following in the footsteps of his merchant ancestors, Bhakta Bir Singh went to Tibet to manage the family shop at a young age. He divided his time between Kathmandu, Lhasa and Kalimpong in India, a trade center and staging point for mule caravans to Tibet.

== Samyak and the revolution ==
Bhakta Bir Singh's father Samyak Singh had made a pledge in 1950 to sponsor a special Samyak next year, and issued invitations to the ceremony, but he died while the preparations were being made. His sons went ahead with the arrangements to hold it as scheduled. However, the Nepalese revolution broke out, and their plans got caught in the middle. Since Samyak requires the presence of the head of state, Bhakta Bir Singh and his brothers were put in a difficult position regarding whom to invite.

In November 1950, King Tribhuvan went into exile in New Delhi, India in an attempt to bring down the Rana regime which held real power in the country. The Ranas then made his grandson Gyanendra the king. They pressed Bhakta Bir Singh to hold Samyak with Gyanendra presiding over it in order to grant him cultural endorsement. The freedom fighters, meanwhile, threatened him not to do so. Bhakta Bir Singh found a way out of the dilemma by citing his father's recent death and deferring the event.

The Ranas were overthrown in February 1951, and Tribhuvan returned to Nepal. A year later, the postponed Samyak was held on 15 January 1952 with Tribhuvan presiding over it. A stone mandala was installed at the venue at Bhuikhel to commemorate the event. The religious celebration was seen as an affirmation of the king's triumph in the power struggle against the hereditary prime ministers the Ranas.

Samyak commemorates the practice of giving to the Buddhas and monks in the Newar Buddhist tradition. It is spread over three days, and is held at Kathmandu Durbar Square and the field at the foot of Swayambhu hill. During the ceremony, hundreds of images of Dīpankara Buddha are assembled, and gifts of different types of food are made to the deities and the Buddhist community.

== See also ==
- Lhasa Newar (trans-Himalayan traders)
- Samyak
