= Daya Bir Singh Kansakar =

Social worker and blood donor in Nepal

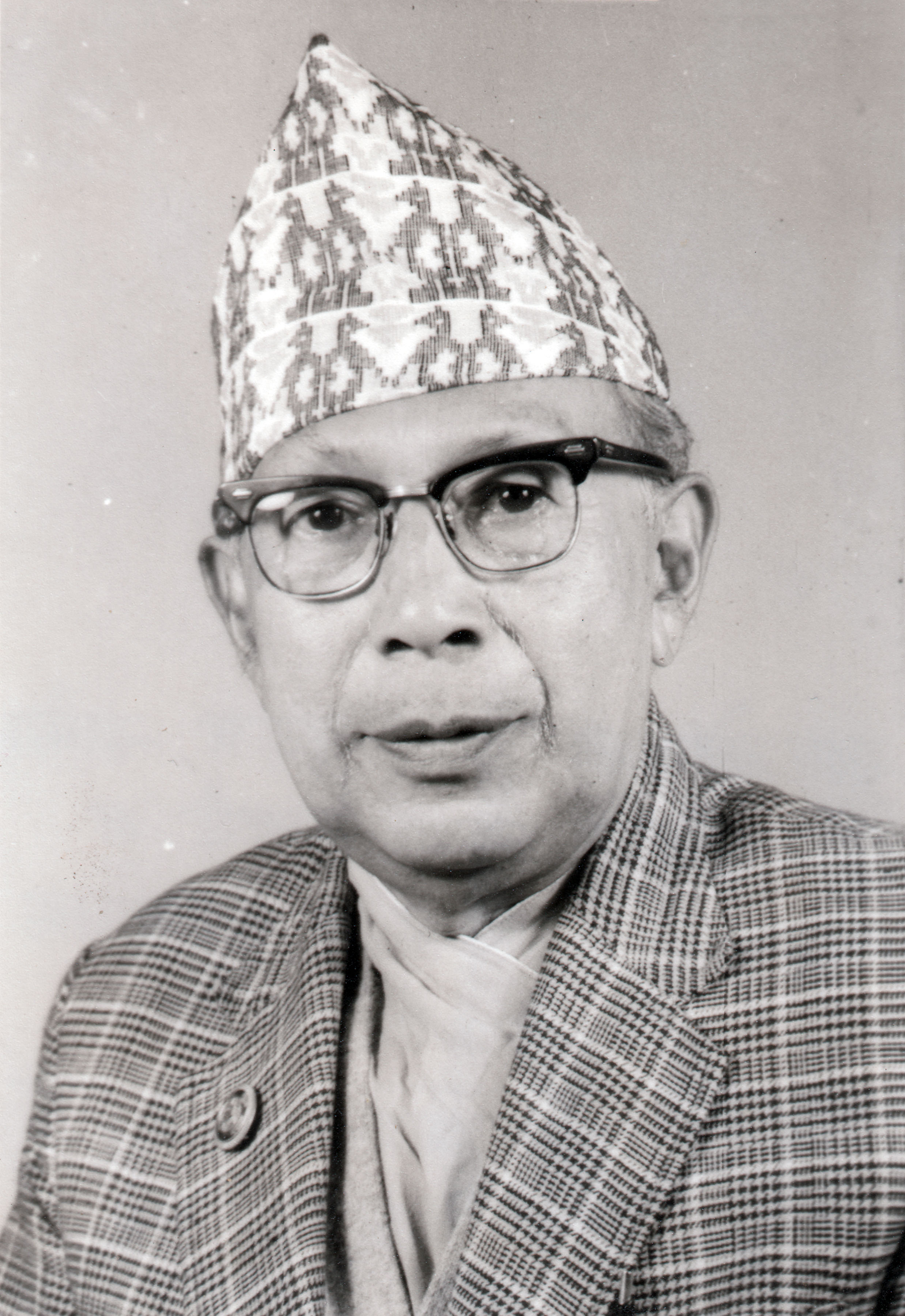
Daya Bir Singh Kansakar

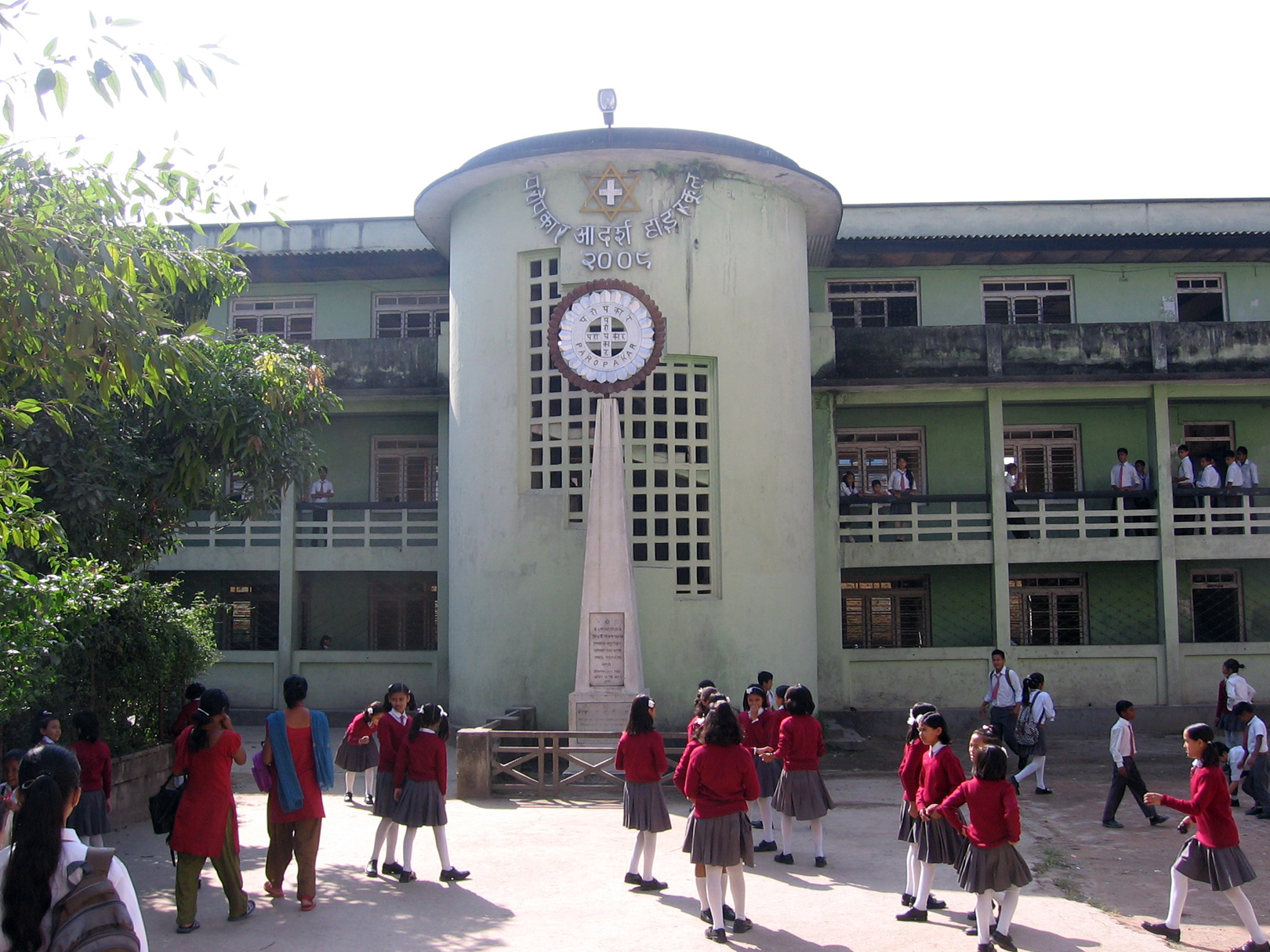
Paropakar Adarsha High School, established 1952

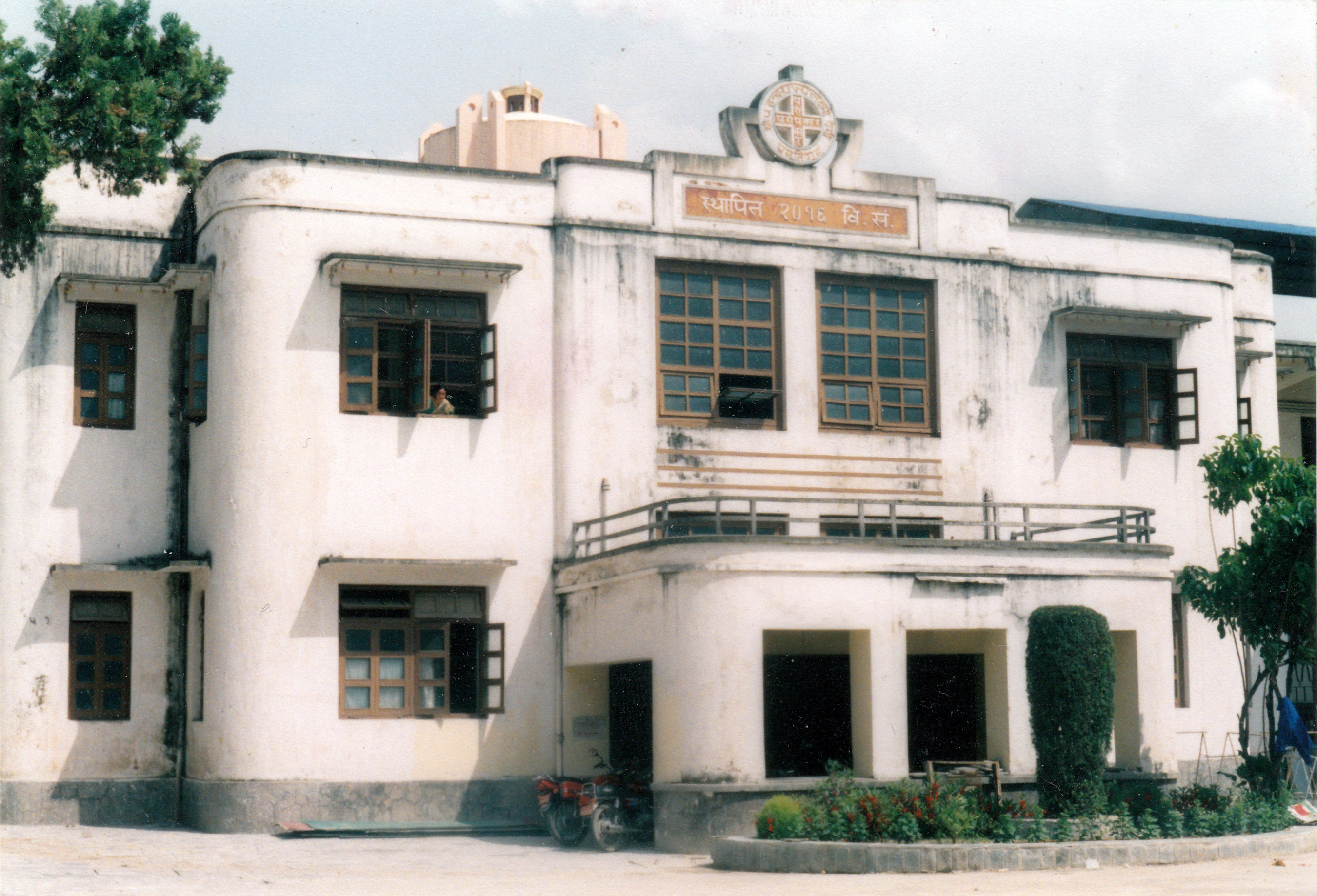
Prasuti Griha maternity hospital, established 1959

Daya Bir Singh Kansakar (Nepali: दयावीरसिंह कंसकार; 1911 – 5 February 2001, Kathmandu, Nepal) was a Nepalese social worker and the first blood donor in Nepal. also the chief founder of Paropakar Organization, the country's earliest social service organization.

== Early life ==
Kansakar was born in Kathmandu. His father, Bhawani Bir Singh Kansakar, was a trader. His mother was named Laxmi Devi. Kansakar studied up to Class 8 at Durbar High School in Kathmandu, and then took up self-study at home. He went to Chandra Laxmi Tuladhar of Nhyokha in 1927.

== Social work ==
In 1944, Kansakar donated blood at Bir Hospital in Kathmandu for a patient who was in a critical state, and became Nepal's first blood donor. He continued to engage in social work, distributing free medicines to the needy. On 26 September 1947, Paropakar was formed under his leadership with the aim of providing service in an institutional manner.

After the revolution of 1951 and the advent of democracy in Nepal, the Paropakar Organization expanded its sphere of activities. On 23 June 1952, Paropakar Orphanage was established. That same year, Paropakar Orphanage Middle School opened.

Kansakar worked to set up Paropakar Indra Rajya Laxmi Devi Prasuti Griha maternity hospital in Kathmandu. Popularly known as Prasuti Griha, it is Nepal's first maternity hospital and opened on 26 September 1959. Kansakar was an advocate of homespun, and set up Karuna Kapa Factory to produce traditional Nepalese cloth. He was also a writer and has produced a number of literary works in Nepal Bhasa.

== Honors ==
Kansakar was recognised as a Role Model Volunteer at the celebration of the International Volunteer Day (IVD) and closing ceremony of International Year of Volunteers 2001 (IYV) in Kathmandu. The Postal Service Department of the government of Nepal issued a commemorative postage stamp depicting Kansakar's portrait in 2002.

He has also been decorated with the Order of Gorkha Dakshina Bahu, Second Class (previously Fourth Class), and the Order of Tri Shakti Patta by the king of Nepal. In 1963, he was named a member of the Privy Council (Raj Sabha). President of Nepal Ram Baran Yadav issued a message on the occasion of the centenary of his birth saying that Kansakar's philanthropic services would always be remembered.
