= Bania (Newar caste) =

Subcastes Buddhist Newar

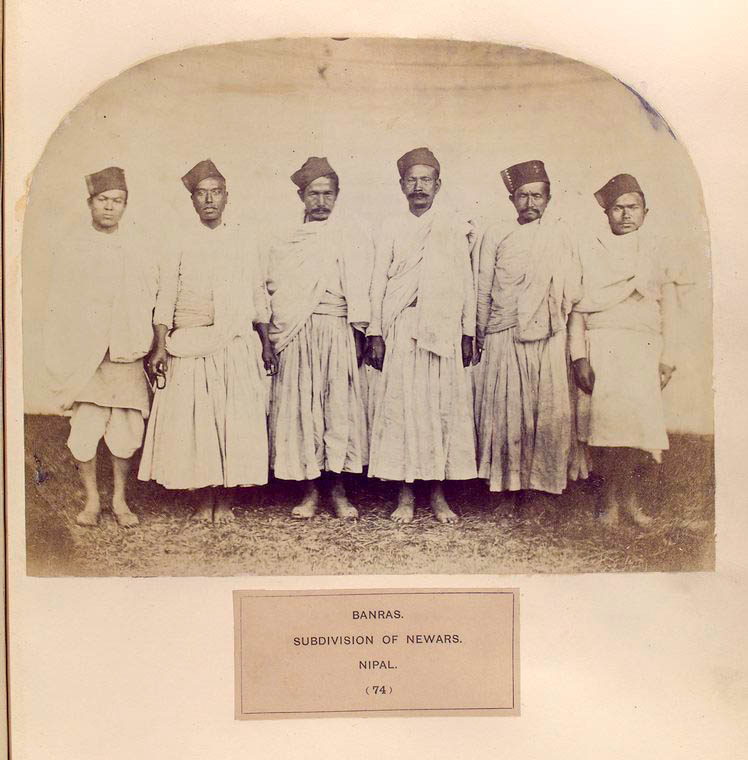
Banras (Banias), subdivision of Newars, Nepal

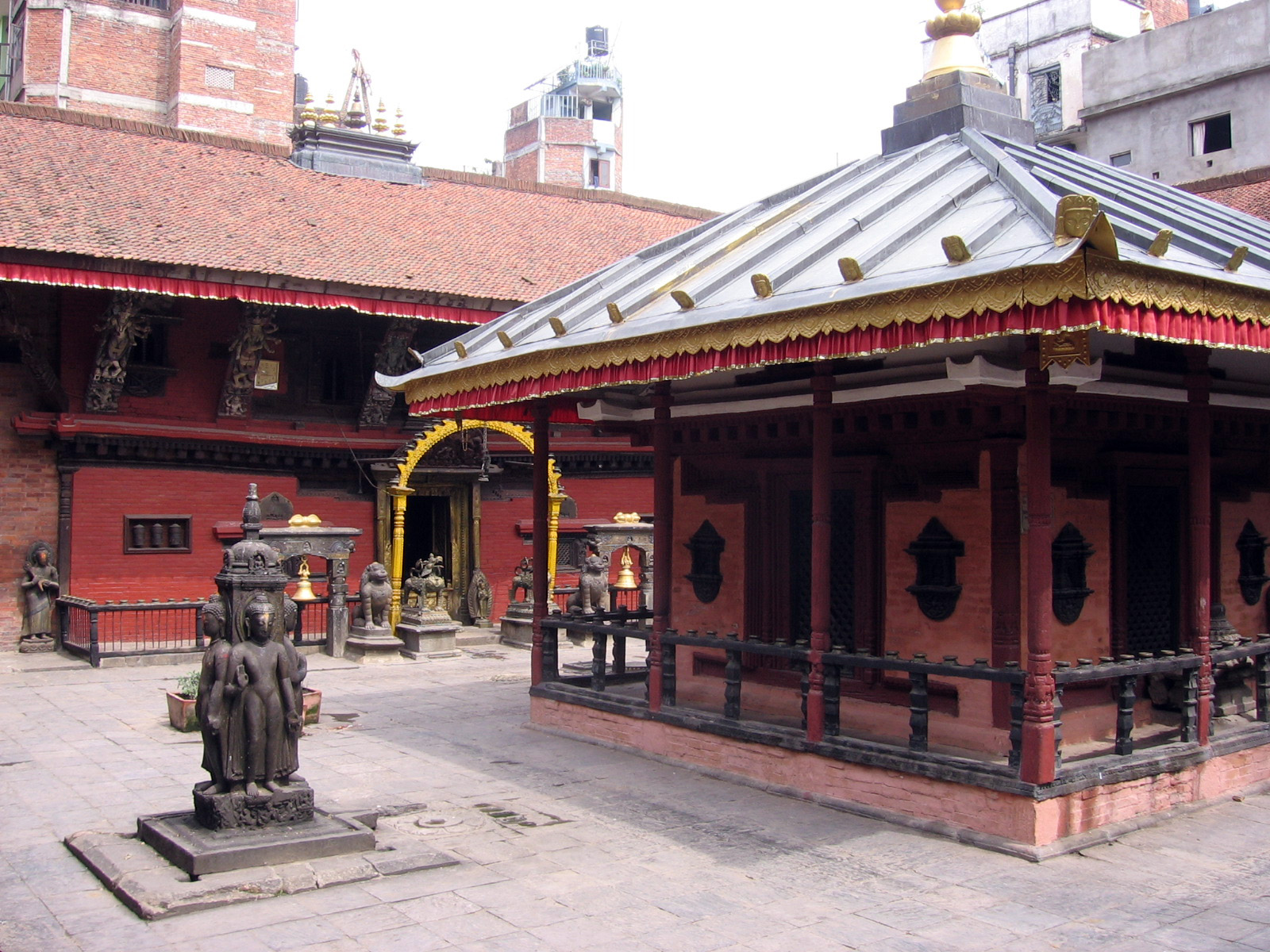
Itum Bahal, Kathmandu. The surrounding area is a traditional Bania neighborhood.

Newari Banias (Devanagari: बनिया) are a Bania caste from the Newar community of the Kathmandu Valley in Nepal. The name Bania is derived from the Sanskrit word vaṇij (merchant); by preference, Bania (caste).

Banias belong to the Urāy group which includes Tuladhar, Kansakar, Tamrakar, Sthapit, Sindurakar, Selalik and other castes. They speak Nepal Bhasa as a mother tongue and follow Newar Buddhism.

== Traditional occupation ==
Banias are traditionally herbalists and wholesalers of raw materials for Newar, Tibetan and Āyurvedic traditional medicines. Traditional Bania neighborhoods in Kathmandu are Itum Bahal, Bania Chuka and Jhwabahal where the streets are lined with herbal shops.

== Cultural life ==
Banias participate in the performance of Gunla Bajan religious music. Samyak is the greatest Newar Buddhist festival held every 12 years in Kathmandu where statues of Dipankara Buddha are displayed. During this festival, each Urāy caste has been assigned a duty from ancient times, and Banias have the task of preparing and serving "sākhahti", a soft drink made by mixing brown sugar and water.

== Notable Banias ==
- Dharmachari Guruma (1898-1978), Buddhist nun who helped to restore Theravada Buddhism and built the first nunnery in Nepal, formerly Laxmi Nani Bania (née Tuladhar)
- Iswarananda Shresthacharya, author and linguist
- Salin Man Bania (Actor)
