= Dharmachari Guruma =

Nepalese angarika (1898–1978)

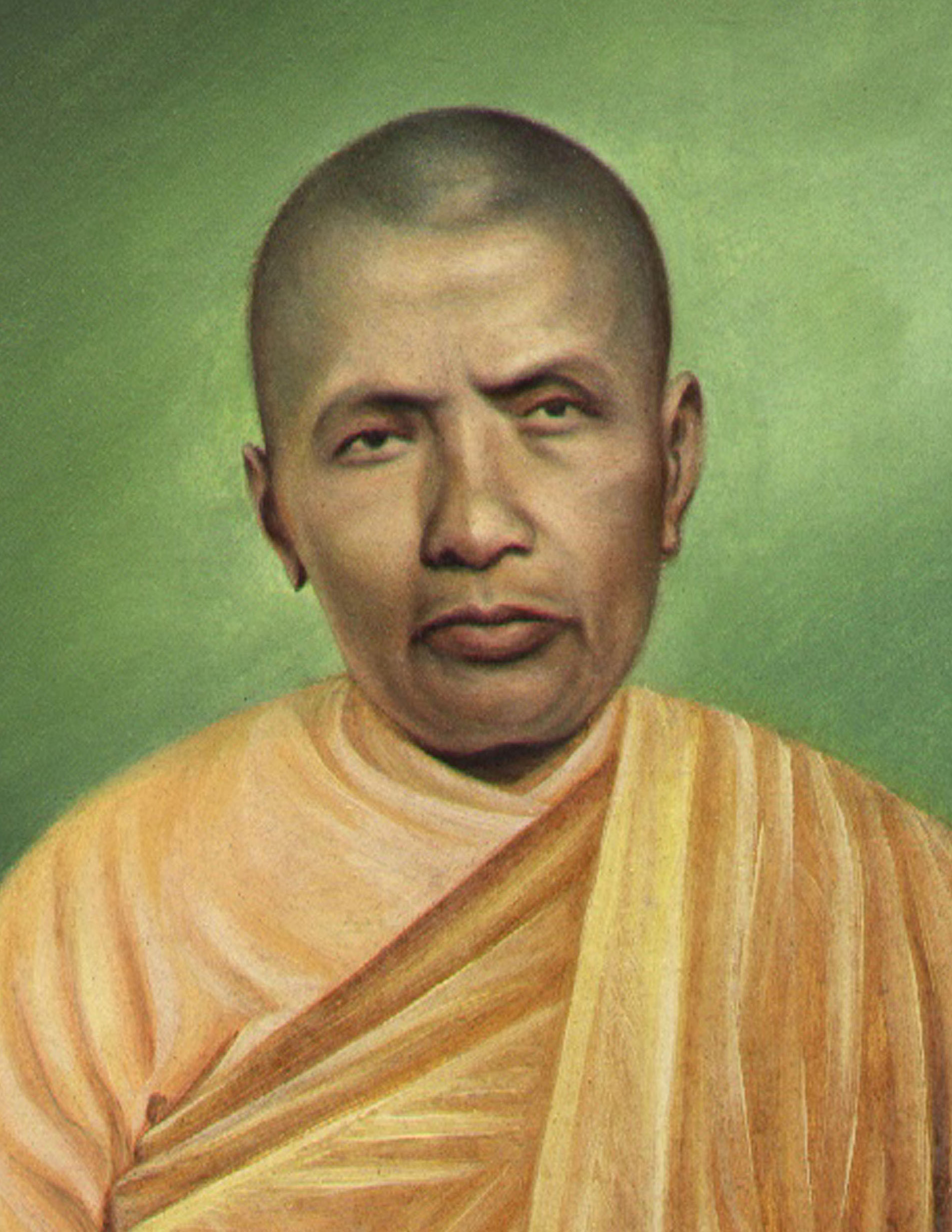
Dharmachari Guruma

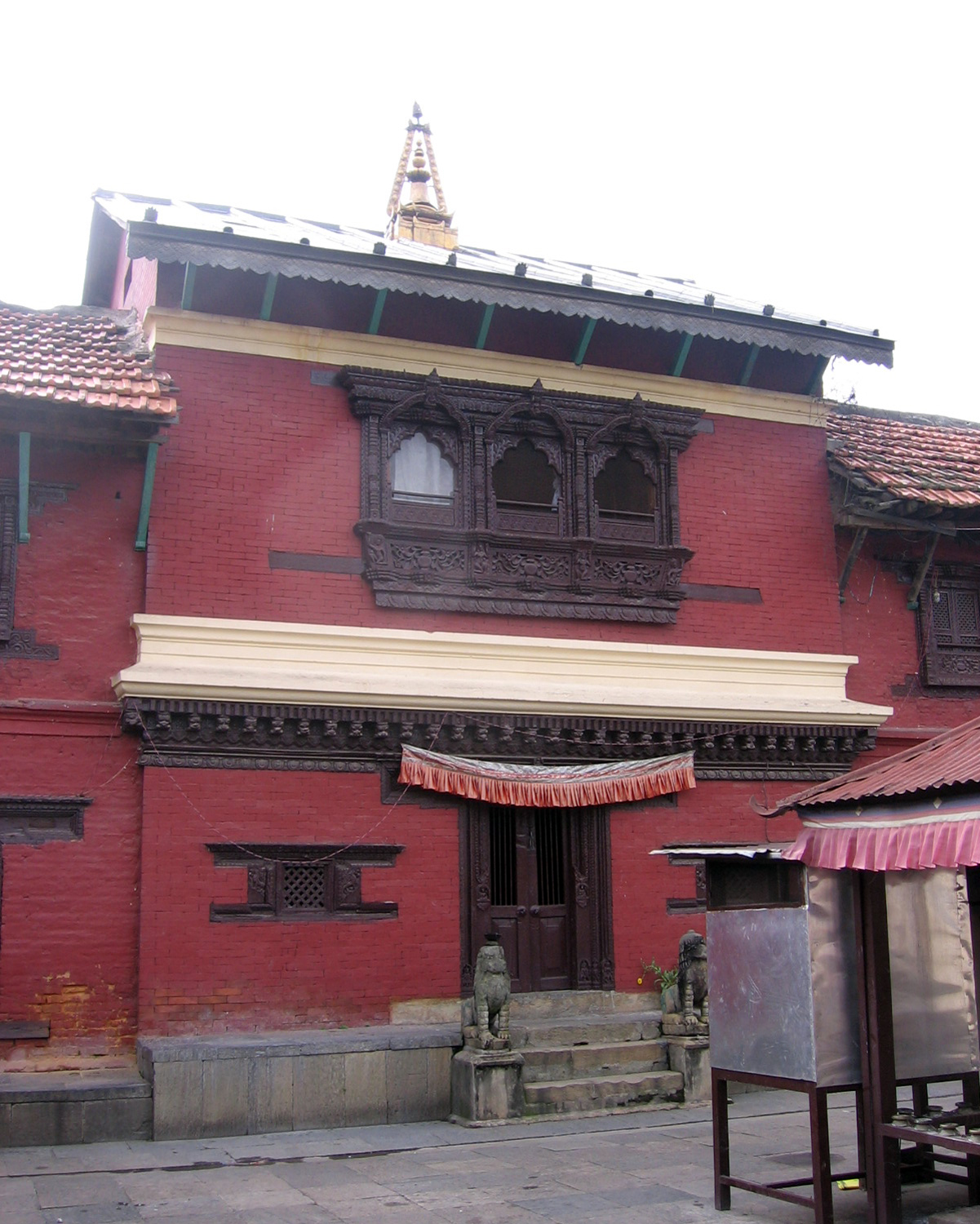
Kimdo Baha, Kathmandu

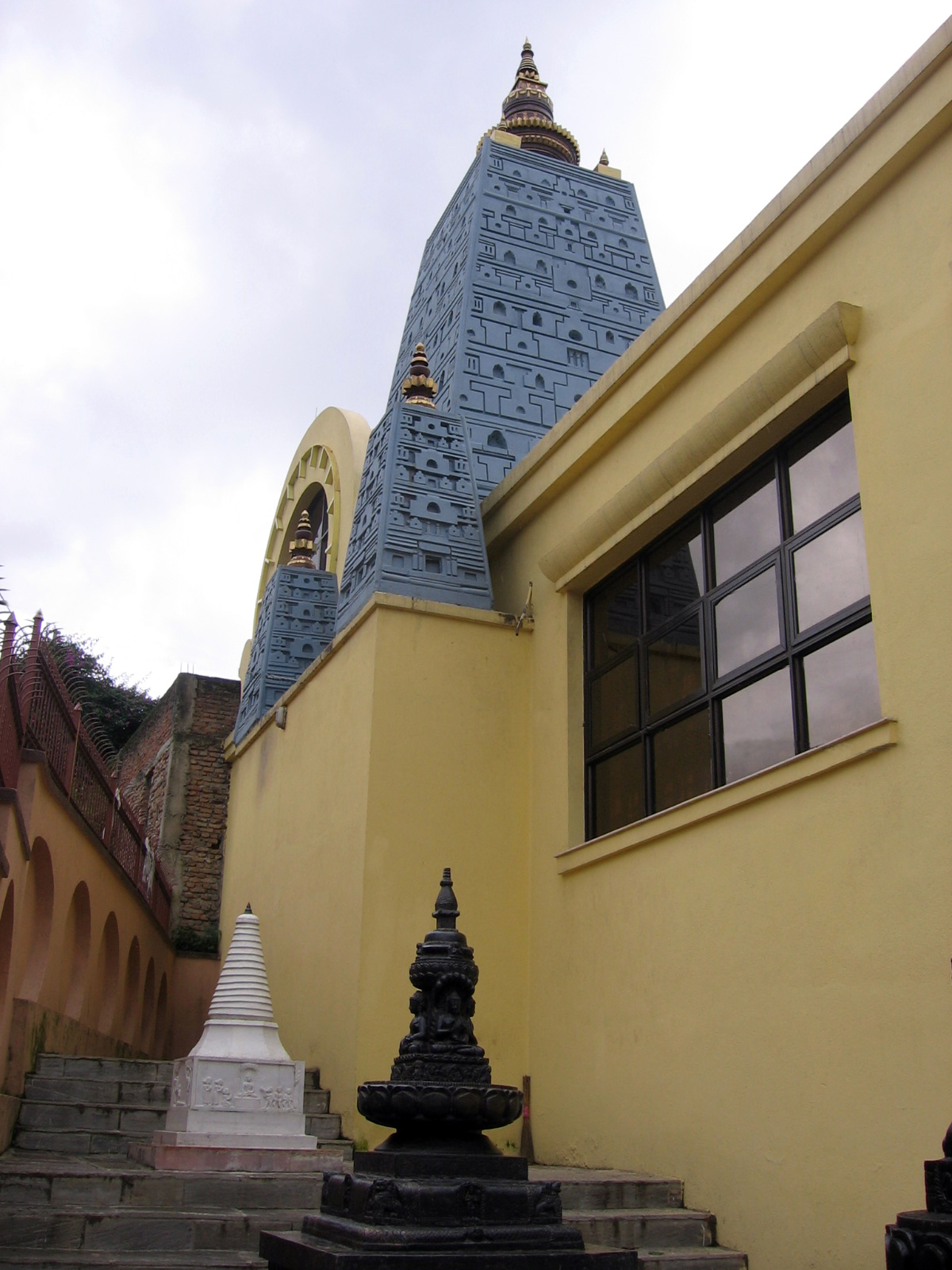
Nirvana Murti Vihara, Kathmandu

Dharmachāri Gurumā (Nepali: धर्मचारी गुरुमाँ) (born Laxmi Nāni Tulādhar) (14 November 1898 – 7 January 1978) was a Nepalese anagarika who was an influential figure in the revival of Theravada Buddhism in Nepal. She was expelled from Kathmandu by the government for her religious activities.

Dharmachari was a progressive and fought social mores and government repression to become a nun. She acquired an education and traveled out of the country to study Buddhism and receive ordination. Dharmachari also established the first nunnery in Nepal.

== Early life ==
Laxmi Nani was born at Dhyākwachhen, Asan, a historical neighborhood in central Kathmandu. She was the fourth among seven siblings. Her father was Man Kaji and mother Ratna Maya Tuladhar. During Laxmi Nani's early years, it was difficult to receive an education, and for girls even more so. However, encouraged by a neighbourhood shopkeeper and her mother, she taught herself to read and write.

In 1909, Laxmi Nani was married to Sete Kaji Bania of Itum Bahal who belonged to a family of hereditary herbalists. A son was born to her in 1916 who died in infancy. In 1919, her husband died when she was seven-months pregnant with their daughter. In 1927, her daughter died too. The loss of her entire family in a few years made her become more deeply involved in religious activities.

== Dharma teacher ==
As Laxmi Nani (alternative names: Laxmi Nāni Upāsikā, Laxmi Nāni Baniā) was literate and skilled in mixing herbal medicines, she was a respected member of the household. She fulfilled her responsibilities in the extended family even as she studied Buddhist books. She taught what she learned to a group of women students who met at Kindo Baha, a 17th-century monastic courtyard at the foot of Swayambhu. The dilapidated monastery had been restored in 1926 by the efforts of Buddhist scholar Dharmaditya Dharmacharya and benefactor Dharma Man Tuladhar.

The gatherings at Kindo Baha attracted the attention of a suspicious government, and the women were hauled before the prime minister. He told them that studying religious books and speaking in front of a crowd was not for women, and that they should go home and look after their families. However, they continued to study in secret.

Laxmi Nani also composed hymns in the Newar language. Her composition was first printed in 1929 in the magazine Buddha Dharma wa Nepal Bhasa published from Kolkata. The songs urged women to acquire an education and exposed social evils of the day.

== Ordination in Burma ==
In 1930, the return to Nepal of Pragyananda Mahasthavir, the first yellow-robed monk in the country since the 14th century, propelled the Theravada Buddhist movement further. Laxmi Nani and five of her companions decided to renounce lay life and be ordained as nuns. In 1934, she led her friends to Kushinagar, India and then to a nunnery in Arakan, Burma where they received ordination. Laxmi Nani was given the dharma name Dharmachari. They returned to Kathmandu and continued their work at Kindo Baha.

== Into exile ==
Kindo Baha was turned into a center of Theravada Buddhism by the monks and nuns who were trained abroad. They conducted regular worship services, and the number of devotees coming to listen to the sermons kept increasing. As the crowds became larger, an intolerant government turned hostile. Spies hovered around Kindo Baha, and devotees had to face repeated police harassment. In 1944, the government took the extreme step of expelling all the monks in Kathmandu. A year later, the nuns were also banished.

While the monks had to leave Nepal, the women were sent to Trishuli, a day's journey to the north of Kathmandu on the way to Tibet. Here too, the nuns gave sermons and taught the Dharma. Their activities were reported to the prime minister; and barely a month after their arrival in Trishuli, the police came and marched them back to Kathmandu. They were kept at the police station at Durbar Square where they were questioned. They were freed the next day.

In 1946, a Sri Lankan goodwill mission visited Nepal and pleaded with the government on behalf of the banished monks. They were thus allowed to return and continue their activities unhindered.

== Nirvana Murti Vihara ==
Considering the crowded conditions at Kindo Baha, Dharmachari began work to establish a separate nunnery. She bought a piece of land nearby and raised funds to build a prayer hall and living quarters. In 1952, the nunnery with its centerpiece, a great statue of the reclining Buddha, was inaugurated. It is now known as Nirvana Murti Vihara.
