= Kul Ratna Tuladhar =

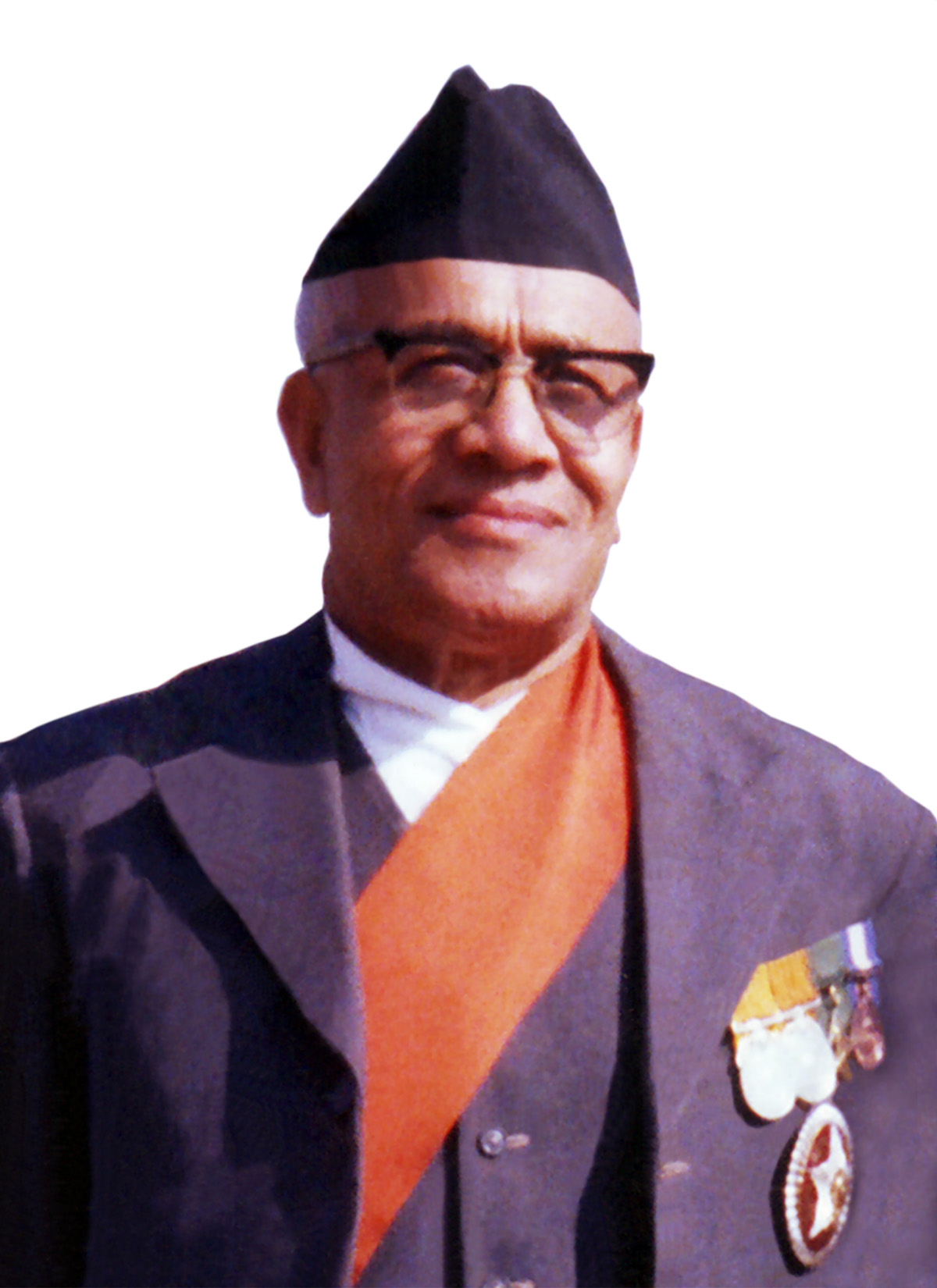
Kul Ratna Tuladhar

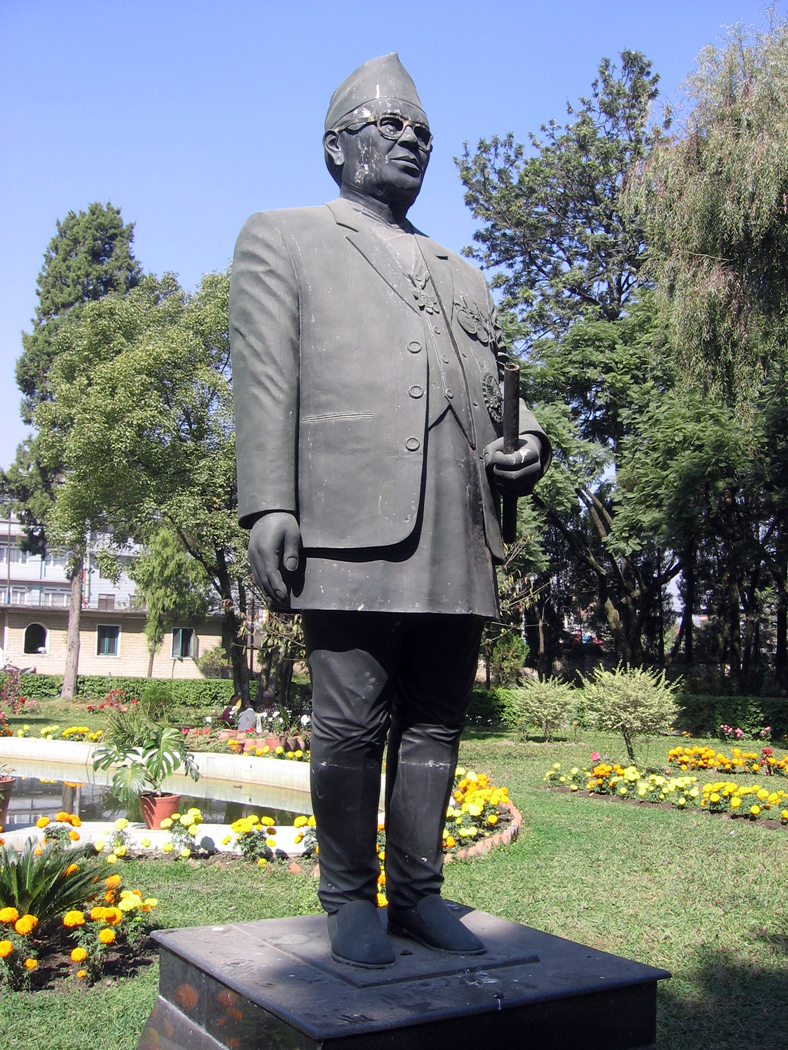
Tuladhar's statue at the Institute of Engineering, Pulchowk

Kul Ratna Tuladhar, CBE (Nepali: कुलरत्न तुलाधर) (6 July 1918 – 2 March 1984) was the first chief engineer of Nepal's Public Works Department where he served since its establishment in 1951 till 1957. The highlight of his term was the construction of Tribhuvan Highway which opened in 1956. This is Nepal's first highway and links the capital Kathmandu with the Indian border to the south.

Tuladhar also played a major role in the development of engineering education in Nepal's modern history.

== Early life ==
Tuladhar was born in Asan, Kathmandu to father Asha Ratna and mother Laxmi Maya Tuladhar. After graduating from Durbar High School in Kathmandu in 1935, he enrolled in Tri-Chandra College in Kathmandu and studied Intermediate in Science, subsequently graduating from Patna University, India in 1937. Tuladhar then pursued further studies at Calcutta University and earned a Bachelor in Engineering in 1941.

== Career ==
Returning to Nepal, Tuladhar joined government service the same year as headmaster of the Engineering Section, Technical School under the Department of Education. In 1951, he became chief engineer of the Public Works Department where he was in charge of design, construction, maintenance and repair of government buildings, roads and bridges in Nepal. Construction of Tribhuvan Highway began in 1953 which marked the start of Nepal's drive towards modernization.

In 1954, Tuladhar became a member of the executive committee of the Nepal Council of World Affairs.

In 1955, Tuladhar went to London and studied at the Architectural Association School of Architecture from where he earned a certificate of post-graduate course in tropical architecture.

He was appointed principal of Nepal Engineering Institute in Lalitpur in 1962, subsequently becoming the first dean of the Institute of Engineering, Tribhuvan University, Kathmandu in 1973. In 1977, he was appointed a member of the Public Service Commission by the king of Nepal in which capacity he served till 1983.

Tuladhar has co-authored with Ram Krishna Sharma a book on highway construction entitled Manual of Highway Design and Construction which was published in 1960.

== Awards ==
Tuladhar was decorated with the Honorary Commander of the Order of the British Empire (CBE) in 1962. He was awarded the Order of Gorkha Dakshina Bahu I Class in 1969 and the Order of Tri Shakti Patta II Class in 1983 by the king of Nepal.

== Legacy ==
In 2010, a life-sized statue of Tuladhar was erected on the premises of the Institute of Engineering at Pulchok, Lalitpur. A street in downtown Kathmandu was named Kul Ratna Marg by Kathmandu Metropolitan City.
