= Sthapit =

Subcastes Buddhist Newar

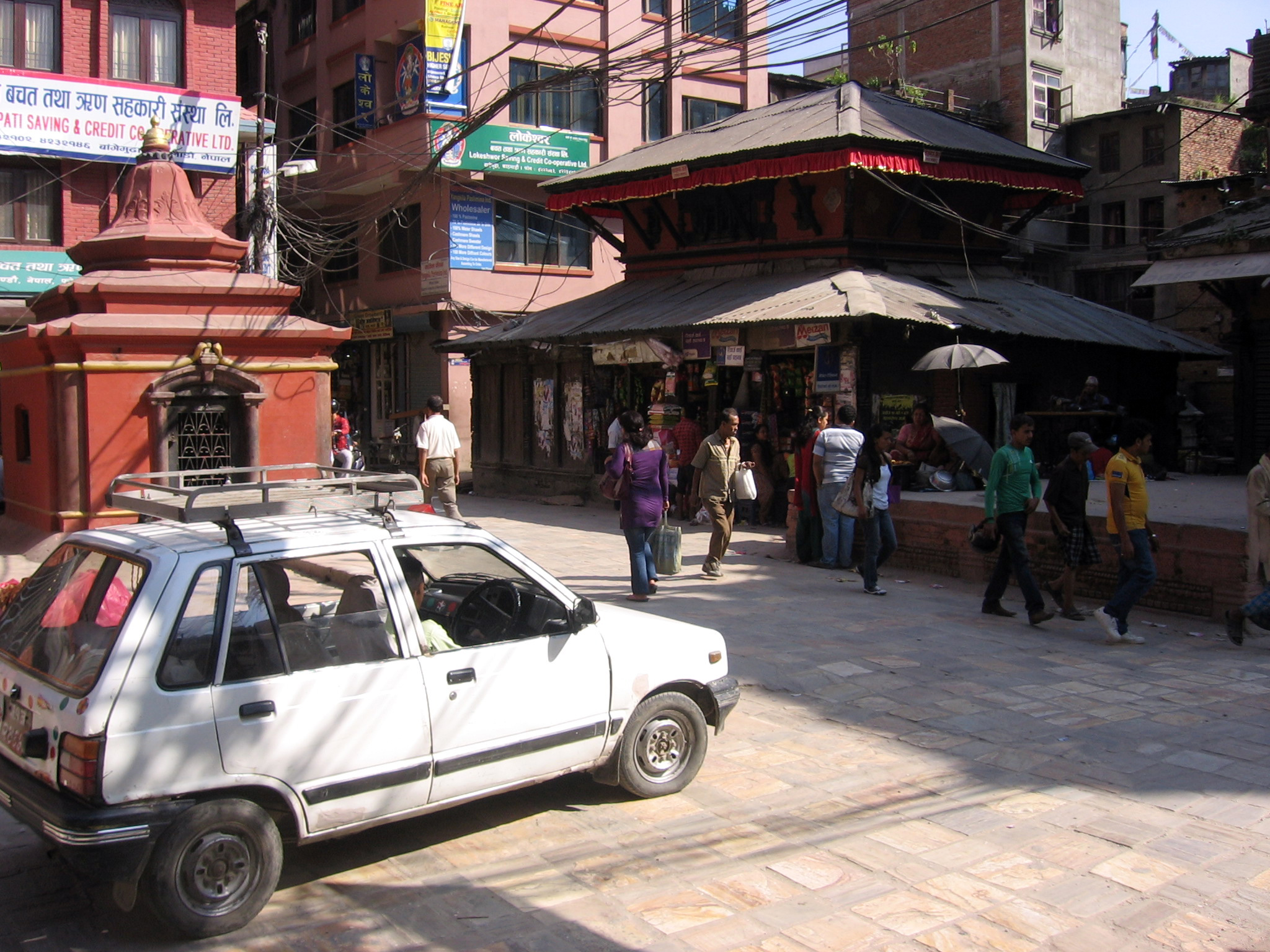
Thaymaru, Kathmandu

Sthāpit (Nepali: स्थापित) is a Nepalese caste from the Newa people of the Kathmandu Valley in Nepal. Sthapits are part of the Uray group which includes Tuladhar, Kansakar, Tamrakar, Bania, Sindurakar, Selalik Kasthakar and other castes. Their religion is Newar Buddhism and their mother tongue is Nepal Bhasa.

Traditional Sthapit neighborhoods in Kathmandu are Thaymaru, Bhindyah, Makhan, Mikhadwan and Lagan. Makhan contains the largest population of Sthapits.

== Traditional occupation ==
Sthapit means "establish" in Sanskrit, and their traditional occupation, as per the division of labor laid down from ancient times, has been carpentry, architecture and engineering. They were skilled artisans, and were engaged in designing and building palaces, houses, temples and machinery.

Among the notable names, Jogbir Sthapit (alternative names: Joglal Sthapit, Bhajuman) was the architect who built Narayanhiti Palace in Kathmandu, the palace of the Shah dynasty, in 1886. He was also the chief architect of the restoration project of Swayambhu which was completed in 1921.

== Cultural life ==
Like other Newar Buddhists, Sthapits mark the holy month of Gunla by making daily pilgrimages to Swayambhu playing Gunla Bajan music. Gunla is the tenth month in the Nepal Sambat calendar which corresponds to August. During the Bahidyah Bwayegu (बहीद्यः ब्वयेगु) festival which is one of the major events of Gunla, devotees led by a Gunla Bajan band make a tour of sacred courtyards in Kathmandu where statues of Dipankara Buddha and paubhas are put on exhibition.

During the Buddhist festival of Samyak, each Uray group has a task assigned to it by tradition, and Sthapits build the wooden viewing stand. Samyak is the greatest Newar Buddhist ceremony in which large images of Dipankara Buddha are exhibited at Kathmandu Durbar Square and Swayambhu. It is held once every 12 years in Kathmandu.

== Notable Sthapits ==
- Jogbir Sthapit (1838-1926), architect who designed Narayanhiti and Seto Durbar palaces and supervised restoration of Swayambhu in 1918.
- Nirgun Sthapit (1968-1990), martyr of 1990 People's Movement.
- Sanu Sthapit, mechanical engineer who built a small goods train in Kathmandu.
- Sanu Ratna Sthapit (1928-2010), philanthropist, trader and pioneer hotelier.
- Nani Bhai Sthapit (1930 - 2019), Founder of Uday Samaj.
- Keshav Sthapit - Honorable Former Mayor of Kathmandu Metropolitan city.
- Manik Ratna Sthapit : Veteran singer and musician
- Lorina Sthapit: Co-founder of Aji's
