= Mandas Tuladhar =

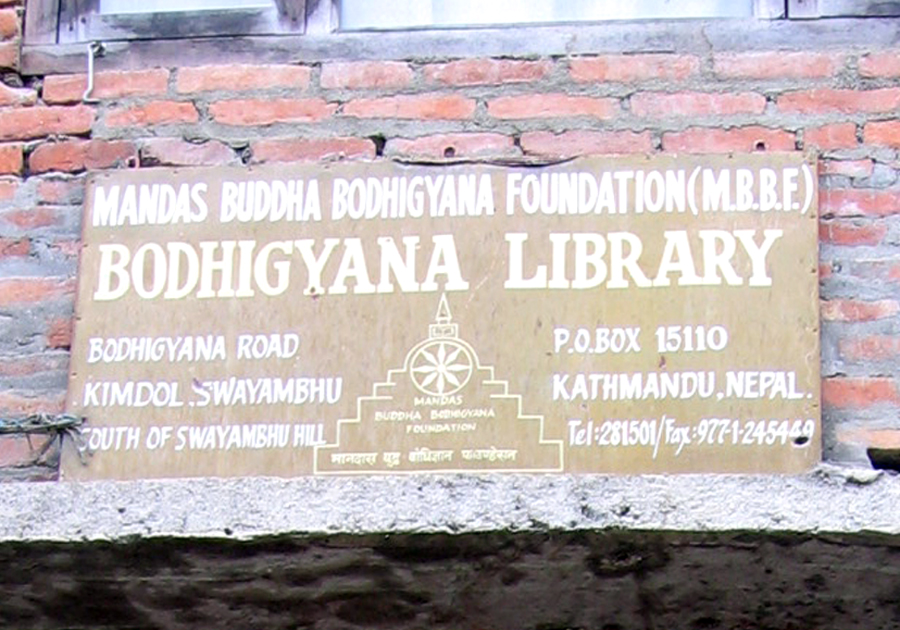
Signboard of Bodhigyana Library

Mandas Tuladhar (Nepali: मानदास तुलाधर) (1900-1975) was a Nepalese Buddhist scholar, Nepal Bhasa activist and pioneer publisher. He collected and published ancient hymns and folk songs which is his finest contribution to the preservation of Nepalese cultural heritage.

== Early life ==
Tuladhar was born to a merchant family at Asan Kamalachhi, Kathmandu. His father was Ratna Das and mother Laxmi Shobha Tuladhar. When he was 16 years old, he was married to Dhan Maya, the daughter of Dharma Sundar Tuladhar of Dhalasikwa, Kathmandu.

After his father's death in 1921, the burden of running the household fell on him, and he went to Lhasa, Tibet to take over the family shop. It wasn't very successful, so he returned to Kathmandu. Later, he moved to Kalimpong and then Sikkim in India and engaged in various businesses. He returned to Nepal after a few years.

== Career ==
In 1931, Tuladhar and a group of other liberal-minded people including poet Yogbir Singh Kansakar started a movement to reform traditional religious customs. They were arrested and publicly flogged for their activities by the Rana regime. They were then brought before the prime minister and released after a warning "not to indulge in such mischievous activities again".

In 1934, Tuladhar teamed up with his nephew poet Chittadhar Hridaya and opened a bicycle shop named Mandas Chittadhar. It gradually transformed into a book store as both uncle and nephew were keen readers. Access to education and books was difficult at the time, and their book store became a hub for students and writers. Subsequently, Tuladhar established two publishing firms named Mandas Sugatdas and Himalaya Pioneer Publication to promote writers and expand the country's corpus of books.

Tuladhar's other interest was Nepal Bhasa poetry, and he spent 48 years collecting hymns, folk songs and sacred texts in an effort to preserve Nepal's literary, cultural and musical heritage. He toured the Kathmandu Valley and gathered thousands of Hindu and Buddhist hymns in Nepal Bhasa and 275 Sanskrit songs, becoming an authority on old songs. He has published a number of anthologies that have proved valuable for researchers.

A major achievement of this quest was his discovery of the original manuscript of the play Mahasattva (महासत्व) written by King Rajendra Bikram Shah in 1831. The play is based on a Buddhist story.

== Legacy ==
In 1997, Tuladhar's son Sugatdas set up the Mandas Buddha Bodhigyana Foundation with the aim of continuing his work of publishing and preserving Buddhist books. The foundation also operates the Bodhigyana Library which opened in 1999.
