= Nhuchhe Ratna Tuladhar =

Nhuchhe Ratna Tuladhar (Nepali: न्हुछेरत्न तुलाधर, 1888 – 25 December 1950) was a Nepalese democracy activist who was martyred in the freedom struggle against the Rana regime. He lived at Asan Baku Nani, a historical neighborhood in central Kathmandu. His wife's name was Hera Lani Tuladhar.

Nhuchhe Ratna had been an anti-Rana activist for a long time, and was a dedicated participant in the revolution that erupted in 1950. In the winter of that year, the decade-old movement to end the rule of the hereditary Rana prime ministers spread to various towns across Nepal. Protests were held frequently. On 25 December 1950, a massive demonstration was brought out in Kathmandu. The police tried to break up the march by beating up the protesters with batons. Nhuchhe Ratna was in the procession and was severely thrashed by the police. He died the same night.

His funeral was held the next day, with a throng of marchers joining the procession from his home at Asan to the cremation ground at Karnadeep on the banks of the Bishnumati River. After the funeral, the accompanying crowd stoned and set on fire an army lorry. Troops then fired tear gas shells to disperse the protesters. The Ranas were eventually overthrown in February 1951, and democracy was established in Nepal.

The Rana oligarchy ruled Nepal from 1846 until 1951. During this time, the Shah king was reduced to a figurehead and the prime minister and other government positions were hereditary. Jang Bahadur Rana established the Rana dynasty in 1846 by masterminding the Kot massacre in which about 40 members of the nobility including the prime minister and a relative of the king were murdered. The massacre took place at the armory at Kathmandu Durbar Square. Jung Bahadur declared himself prime minister and assumed all powers after that. Tyranny, economic exploitation and religious persecution characterized the Rana period.
