= Tuladhar =

Subcastes Buddhist Newar

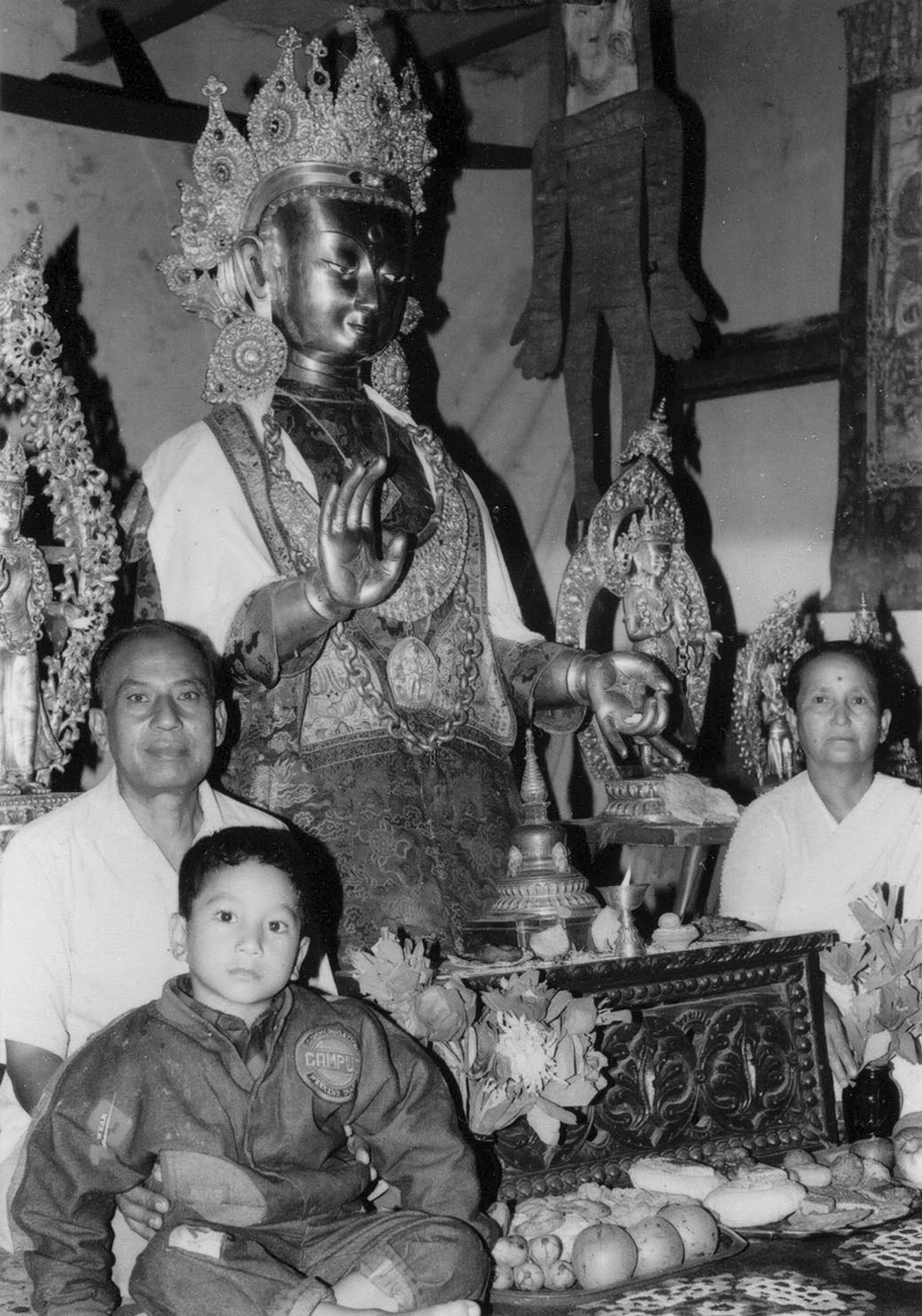
Tuladhar family displaying gilded statue of Dipankara Buddha, commonly known as Bahidyah.

Tulādhar (Devanagari: तुलाधर) is a Nepali/Nepalese caste from the Newar community of the Kathmandu Valley in Nepal. The name Tuladhar is derived from the Sanskrit words "tula" (weighing scale) and "dhar" (possessor), thus meaning scale-bearer or in general, merchant. Tuladhars belong to the Uray group which includes Kansakar, Tamrakar, Sthapit, Bania, Sindurakar, Selalik and other castes. They follow Newar Buddhism and speak Nepal Bhasa as a mother tongue.

Traditional Tuladhar neighborhoods are Asan (Newar: असं Nepali: असन), Nyata (Newar: न्यत) (also known as Naradevi) and Jhwa Baha in Kathmandu where they hold a number of cultural performances annually including religious dances and music concerts.

== Traditional occupation ==
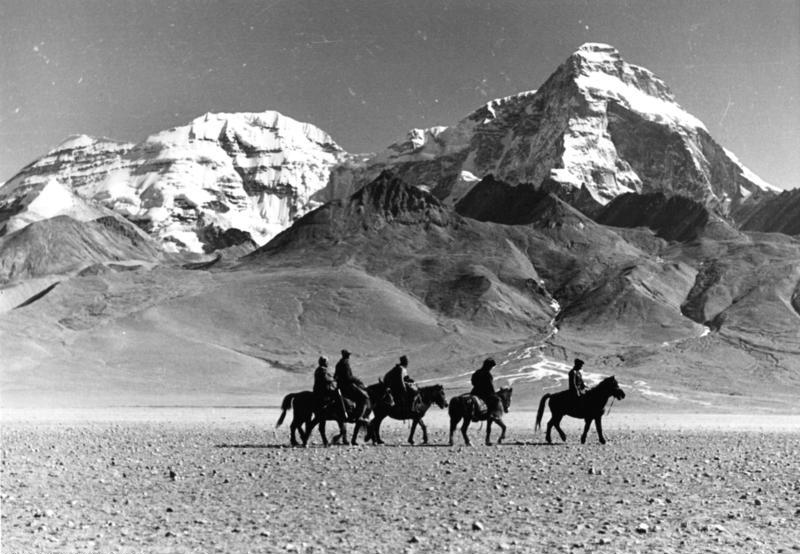
A caravan in Tibet, Mt. Chomolhari in background.

According to the division of labor laid down from ancient times in Newar society, business is the traditional occupation of Tuladhars. They are best known for their history as trans-Himalayan traders conducting trade between Nepal, India and Tibet. From centuries past, they have maintained business houses in Lhasa, Shigatse, Gyantse and other towns in Tibet and in Kalimpong and Kolkata in India moving goods by mule caravan over the Himalayan passes.

The merchants used two trade routes to travel to Tibet. One went north from Kathmandu and crossed the Himalaya at Kuti (now known as Nyalam) or Kyirong, also spelt Gyirong. The other route started at Kalimpong and passed through Nathula or Jelepla on the Sikkim-Tibet border. These trade routes are offshoots of the ancient Silk Road.

Textiles and other factory products were the main exports to Tibet while they brought back wool, musk pods, hides and yak tails. This traditional business came to an end in the mid-1960s after the route through Sikkim was shut down following the 1962 Sino-Indian War, and all the Tuladhar traders returned home. In the course of conducting trade, they have been a cultural bridge between South and Central Asia. Today, while they are still primarily merchants, many pursue varied professions.

== Cultural life ==
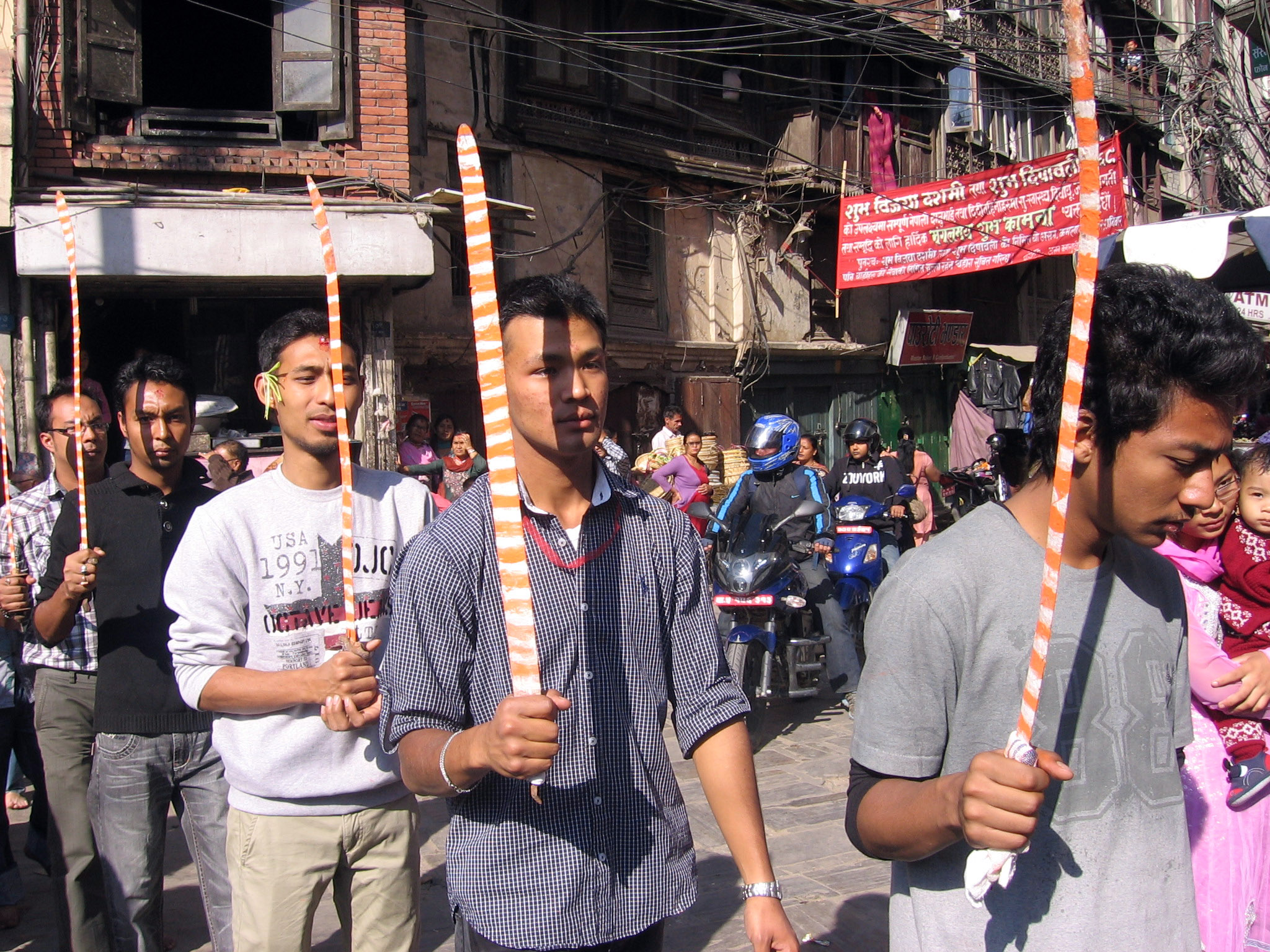
Asan Pāyā sword procession

Tuladhars observe an annual schedule of religious performances, devotional musical concerts and hymn singing sessions that are conducted at the community level. Among the prominent street performances are the Dāpā Thāyegu, Gunla Bajan Thāyegu and Bahidyah Bwayegu festivals.

The month-long Dāpā Thāyegu festival is held in October when they gather to sing hymns every evening. A picture of a sacred jar made of wheat, popcorn and black soybean is displayed at Asan to mark the end of the festival.

During Gunlā, the tenth month in the Nepal Sambat calendar corresponding to August which is held holy by Newar Buddhists, a musical procession goes to Swayambhunath daily in the early morning playing Gunlā Bājan music.

The Bahidyah Bwayegu festival is held in August when a procession of musicians playing Gunla Bajan music and followers make a tour of sacred courtyards in Kathmandu where statues of Dipankara Buddha and paubhas are put on exhibition.

Asan Pāyā (असं पाया) is part of the Mohani festival in October when a sword procession is held at Asan. The ceremony ends with the participants chopping up a gourd painted with the face of a demon.

Tuladhars from Asan and Nyata accompany their respective musical bands and take part in the parade organized to celebrate New Year's Day of Nepal Sambat, the national lunar calendar of Nepal, which falls in October.

During the twelve-yearly Samyak festival, the greatest Newar Buddhist celebration where hundreds of large images of Dīpankara Buddha are displayed at Kathmandu Durbar Square and Swayambhunath, the Tuladhars of Asan place leaf plates and the Tuladhars of Nyata serve boiled rice to the priests who come to receive alms.

== Sacred dances ==
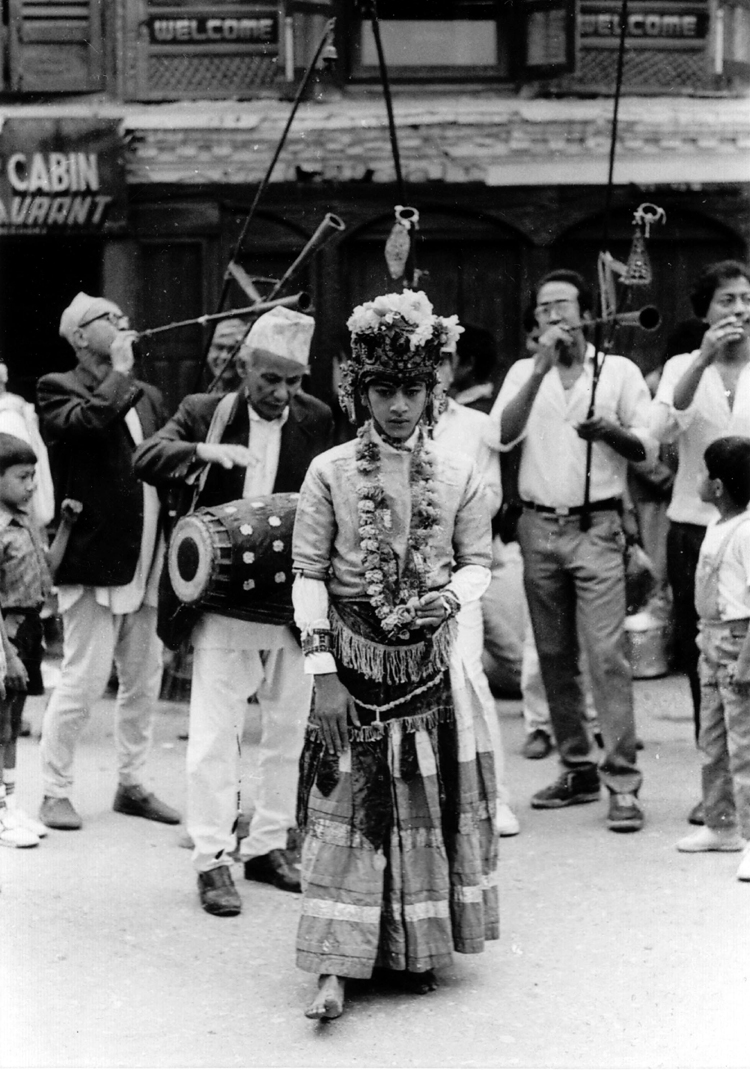
A Tuladhar boy performs the Kumha Pyākhan sacred dance.

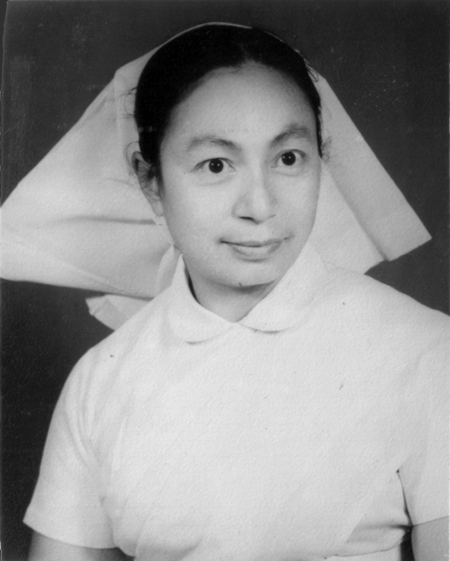
Tara Devi Tuladhar

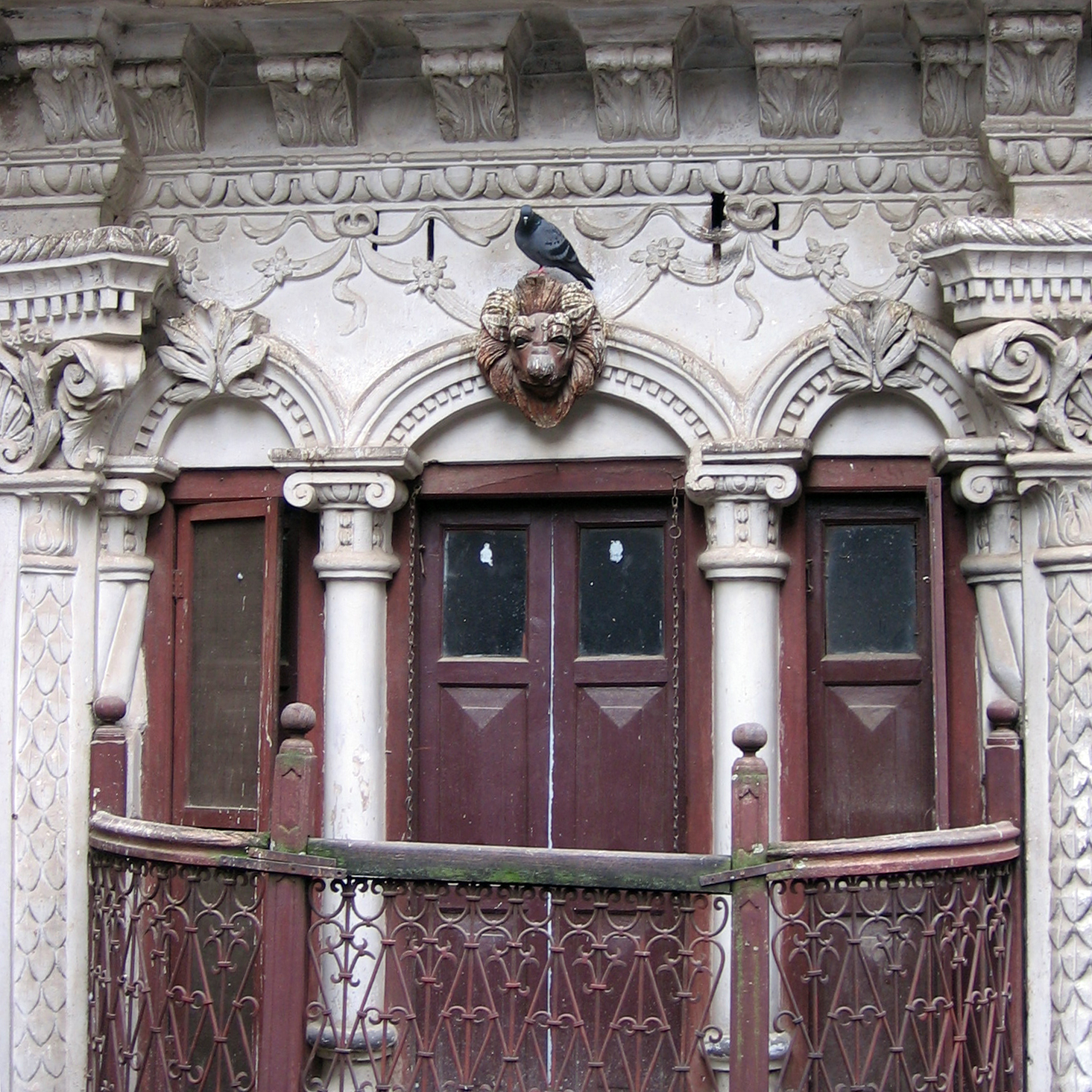
A Tuladhar home in Kathmandu

Sacred dances are another major religious performance of the Tuladhars.

- Kumha Pyakhan dance (कुम्ह प्याखं) (also known as Kumār Pyakhan) is held annually during the Mohani festival in October on the open-air dance platform at Asan and at Kathmandu Durbar Square. A young boy from the Tuladhar or Kansakar families is chosen to be the dancer.
- Nyatamaru Ajimā Pyākhan (न्यतमरु अजिमा प्याखं) (also known as Swetkāli Pyākhan) is held annually on the open-air dance platform at Nyata during the Pahan Charhe festival in April. Once every 12 years, special performances of this masked dance-drama are held with a larger cast in which a Tuladhar from Nyata plays the part of the deity Māhādyah. The special shows are held at the Durbar Squares of Kathmandu, Lalitpur, Kirtipur, Bhaktapur and Bhonta (Banepa).

== Notable Tuladhars ==
Religion

- Aniruddha Mahathera (1915–2003), Buddhist monk who became patriarch of Nepal, formerly Gaja Ratna Tuladhar
- Dhammalok Mahasthavir (1890–1966), Buddhist monk who was exiled by the Ranas for writing in Nepal Bhasa and spreading Theravada Buddhism, formerly Das Ratna Tuladhar
- Dharmachari Guruma (1898–1978), Buddhist nun who was exiled by the Ranas for spreading Theravada Buddhism and established the first nunnery, born Laxmi Nani Tuladhar
- Pragyananda Mahasthavir (1900–1993), Buddhist monk who was exiled by the Ranas for writing in Nepal Bhasa and spreading Theravada Buddhism, formerly Kul Man Singh Tuladhar

Social Work

- Bhakta Bir Singh Tuladhar (1912–1989), merchant, philanthropist and sponsor of Samyak festival held in 1952
- Dharma Man Tuladhar (1862–1938), philanthropist and trader, best known for the renovation of the Swayambhu and Kindo Baha
- Tara Devi Tuladhar (1931–2012), social worker and first female blood donor in Nepal

Arts and Sciences

- Chittadhar Hridaya (1906–1982), poet and one of the greatest literary figures of Nepal, jailed for five years by the Ranas for writing in Nepal Bhasa
- Kul Ratna Tuladhar (1918–1984), first chief engineer
- Mandas Tuladhar (1900–1975), language activist, Buddhist scholar and publisher, jailed and flogged by the Rana regime for religious activities
- Moti Laxmi Upasika (1909–1997), poet, first short story writer in Nepal
- Tara Bir Singh Tuladhar (born 1943), artist and music composer

Trade and Industry

- Karuna Ratna Tuladhar (1920–2008), trader and transport pioneer
- Lupau Ratna Tuladhar (1918–1993), trader and transport pioneer
- Pratek Man Tuladhar (1924–1991), trader and philatelist
- Pushpa Ratna Sagar (1922–2011), trader, Nepal Bhasa grammarian, lexicographer and pressman
- Pushpa Sundar Tuladhar (1885–1935), benefactor and trader
- Triratna Man Tuladhar (1905–1986), trader and Buddhist activist

Politics

- Dharma Ratna Yami (1915–1975), freedom fighter, social reformer, writer and deputy minister, spent seven years in jail for democracy activities
- Nhuchhe Ratna Tuladhar (1888–1950), martyred on 25 December 1950 during democracy movement against Rana regime
- Padma Ratna Tuladhar (1940–2018), human rights activist, writer and former minister, jailed for democracy activities

== Gallery ==
=== Historical ===
A Tuladhar family with brides, 1942.

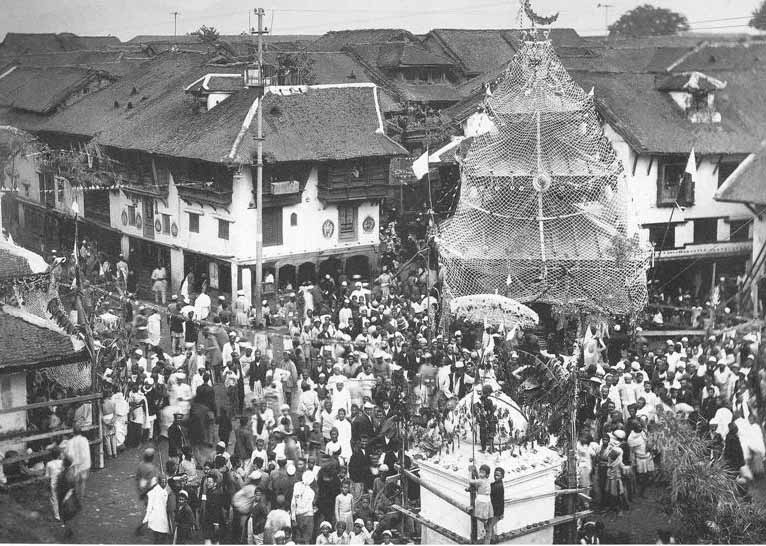
Asan, Kathmandu in the 1920s.

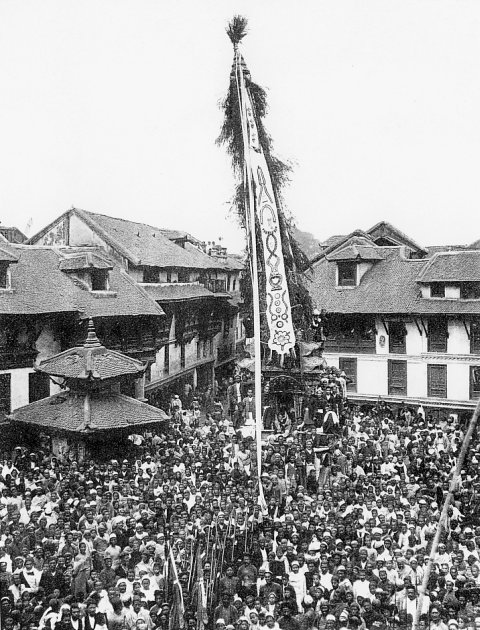
Chariot of Jana Baha Dyah at Asan, ca. 1915.

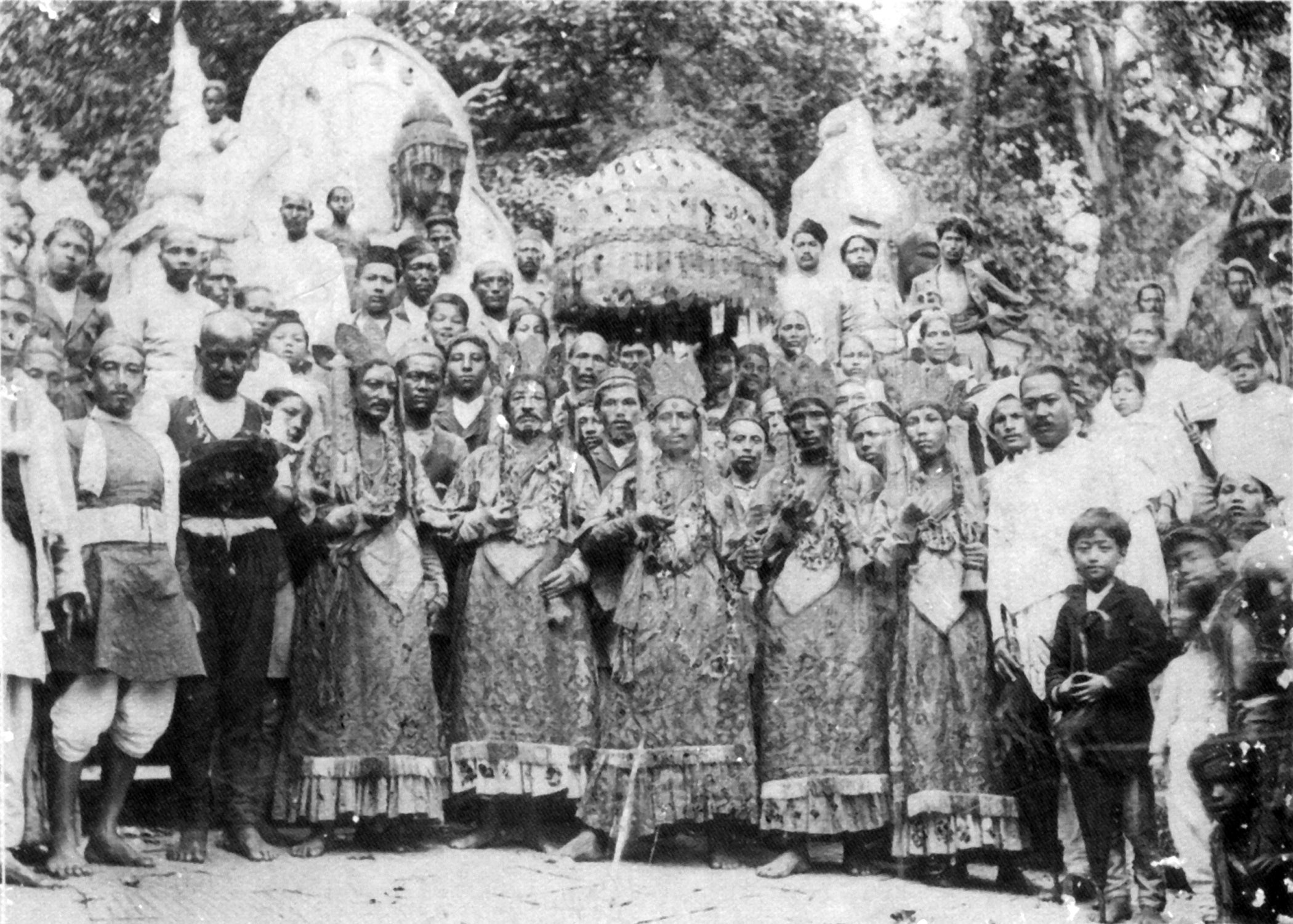
Pushpa Sundar Tuladhar (right), Swayambhu, 1921.

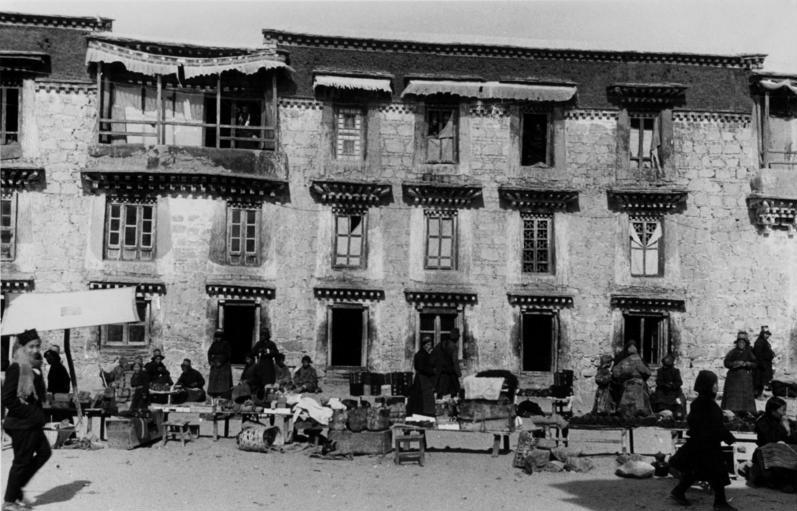
Barkhor, Lhasa's main shopping street in 1938.

=== Contemporary ===
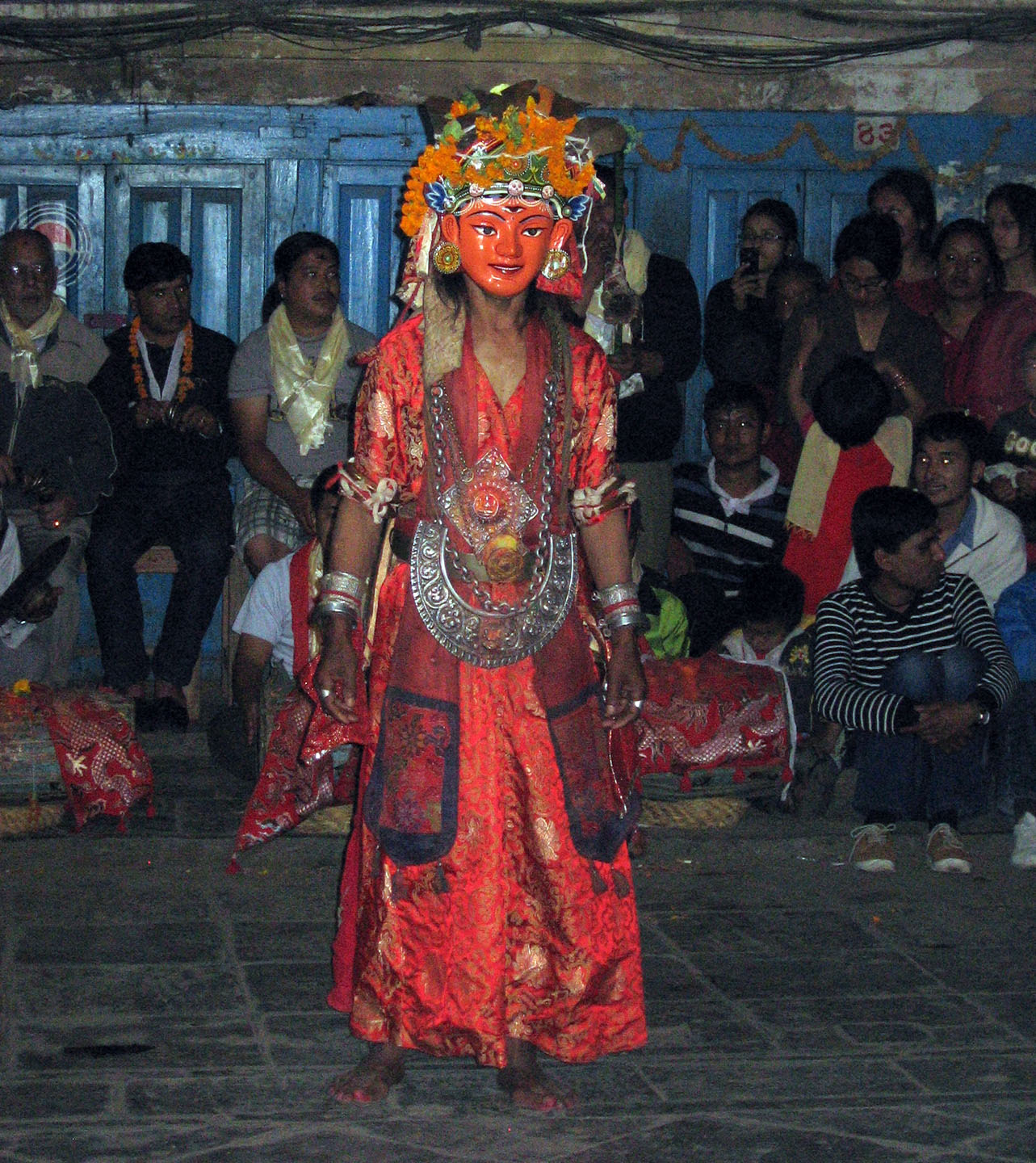
Nyatamaru Ajima Pyakhan masked dance.

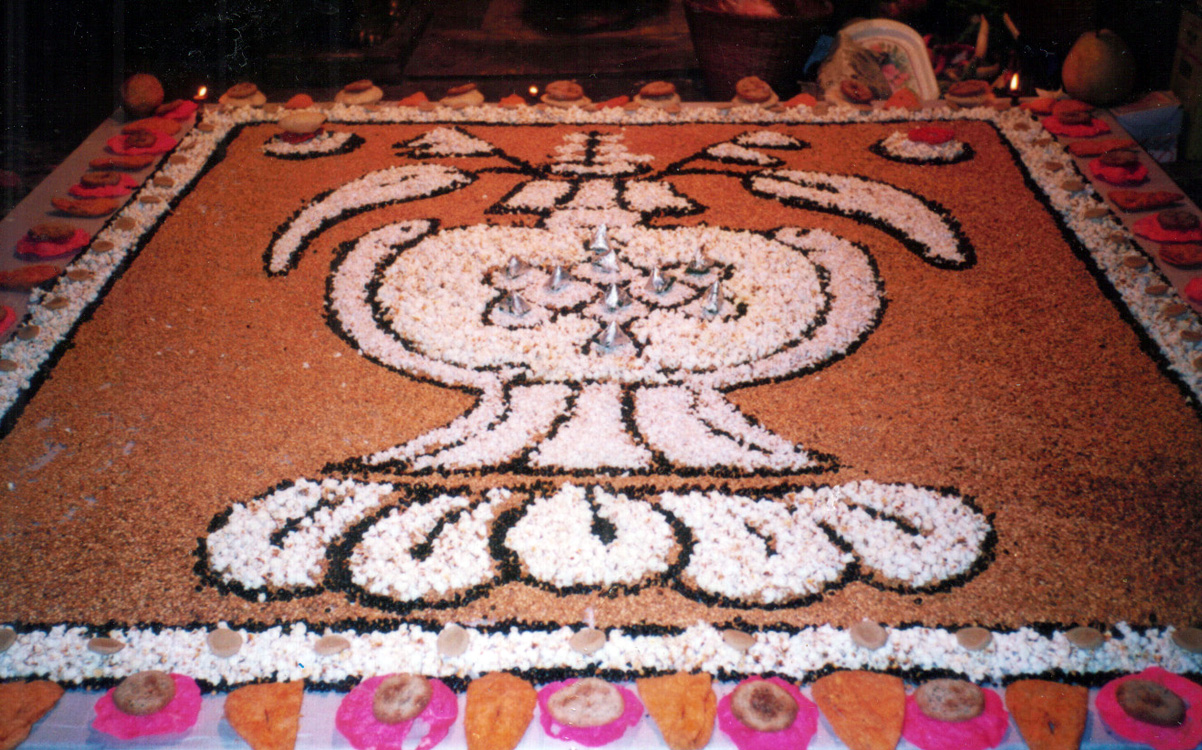
Halimali (grain art) display at Asan.

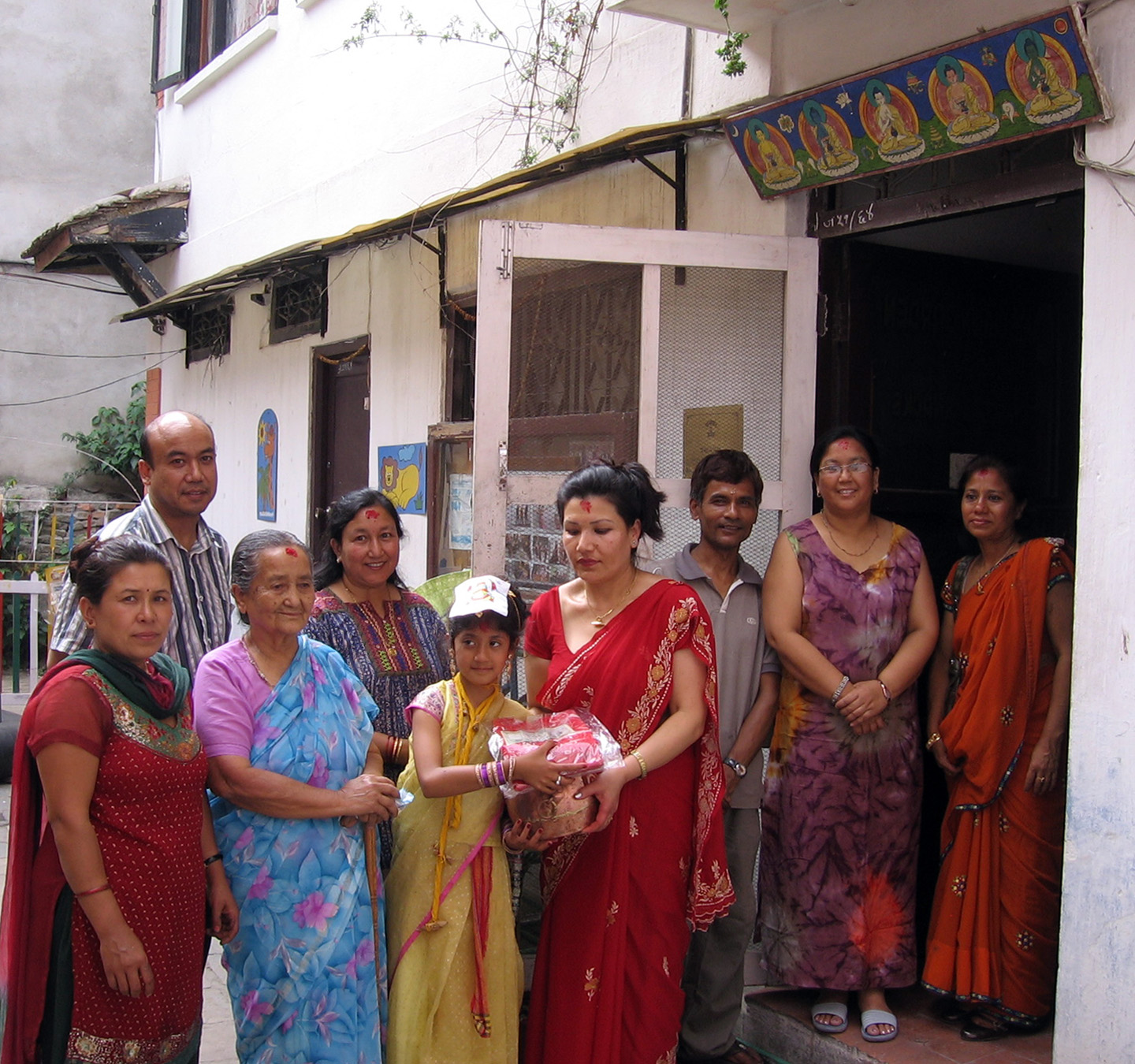
Ihi, life cycle ceremony of young girl.

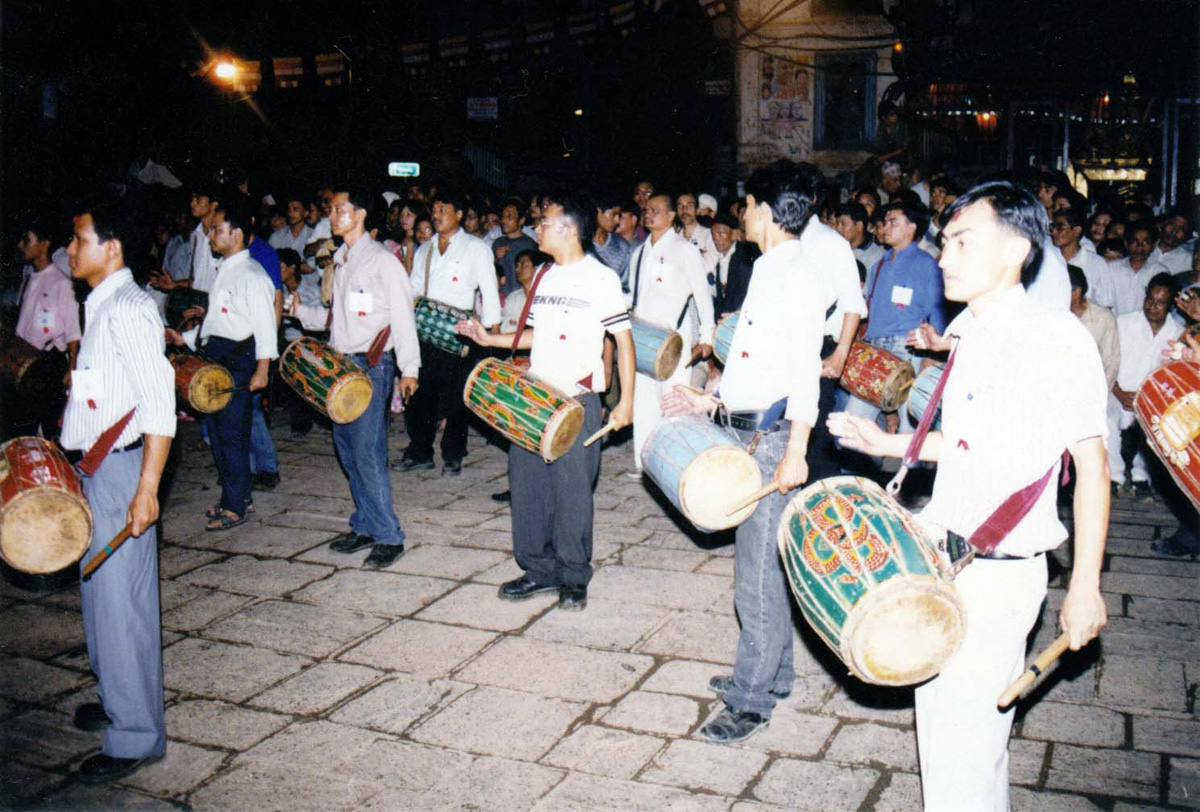
Gunla Bajan music performance at Asan.

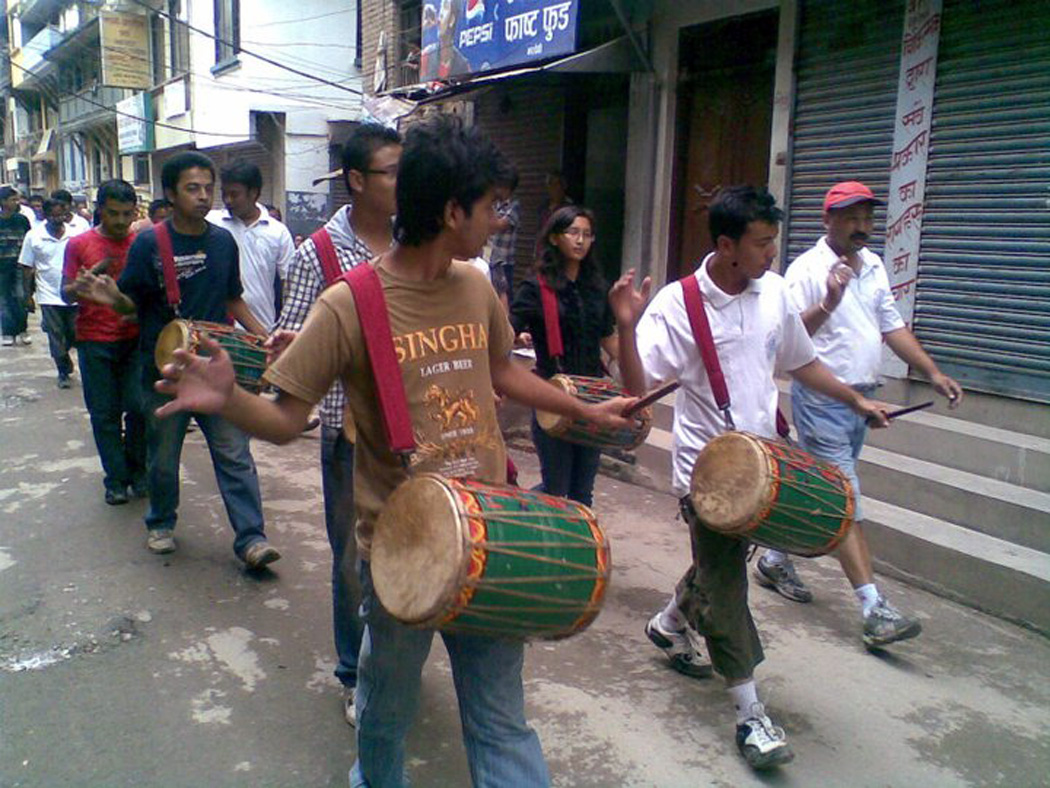
Gunla Bajan band of Nyata in procession.

== See also ==
- Lhasa Newar (trans-Himalayan traders)
- List of Mahaviharas of Newar Buddhism
- Gunla Bajan music
- Kumha Pyakhan dance
