= Kumha Pyakhan dance =

Nepalese classical dance

Kumha Pyakhan
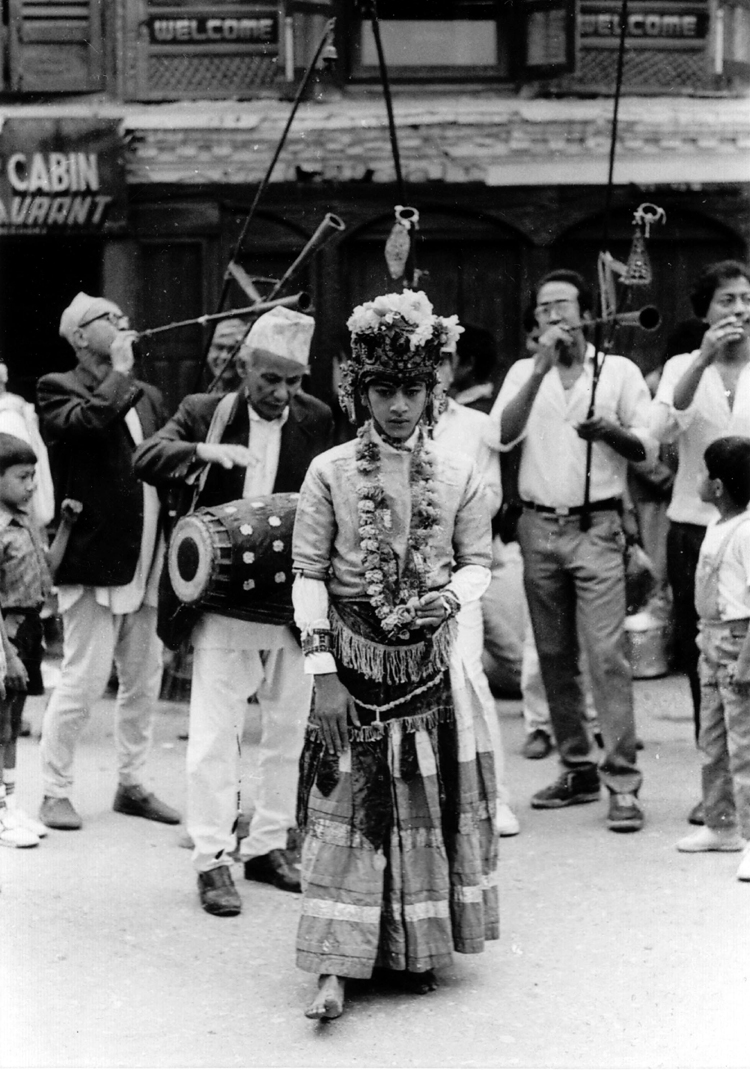
- Native name: कुम्ह प्याखं
- Genre: Nepalese classical dance
- Inventor: Tuladhar and Kansakar people
- Origin: Kathmandu Valley

Kumha Pyakhan (Devanagari: कुम्ह प्याखं, also known as Kumar Pyakhan) is a sacred dance of the Tuladhar and Kansakar caste groups of the Newars of Kathmandu. The dance is performed in temple and market squares during religious festivals.

== The dancer ==
A young boy impersonating the god Kumha performs the dance accompanied by a musical band consisting of drum and ponga (पोंगा) trumpet players. Carrying a bow and arrow, the dancer symbolically protects protects the image of the goddess Taleju when it is brought out of her temple at Kathmandu Durbar Square. Performances are held on the seventh and tenth days of the Mohani festival (Dashain) which takes place in October. The dance is also performed on the stone platform at Asan, Kathmandu.

== Selection ==
The dancer is chosen by lot from among the Tuladhars of Asan and Kansakars of Jana Baha. He receives training from a Gubhaju or Bajracharya priest. The dancer's term lasts around five years when he has to adhere to the rules of his office, which include daily worship of Nasadyah, the god of dance, and eating restrictions.

The Kumha Pyakhan has not been performed since 1998 for lack of funding and candidates when Dibesh Kaji Tuladhar played the part of the deity.
