= Kansakar =

Subcastes Buddhist Newar

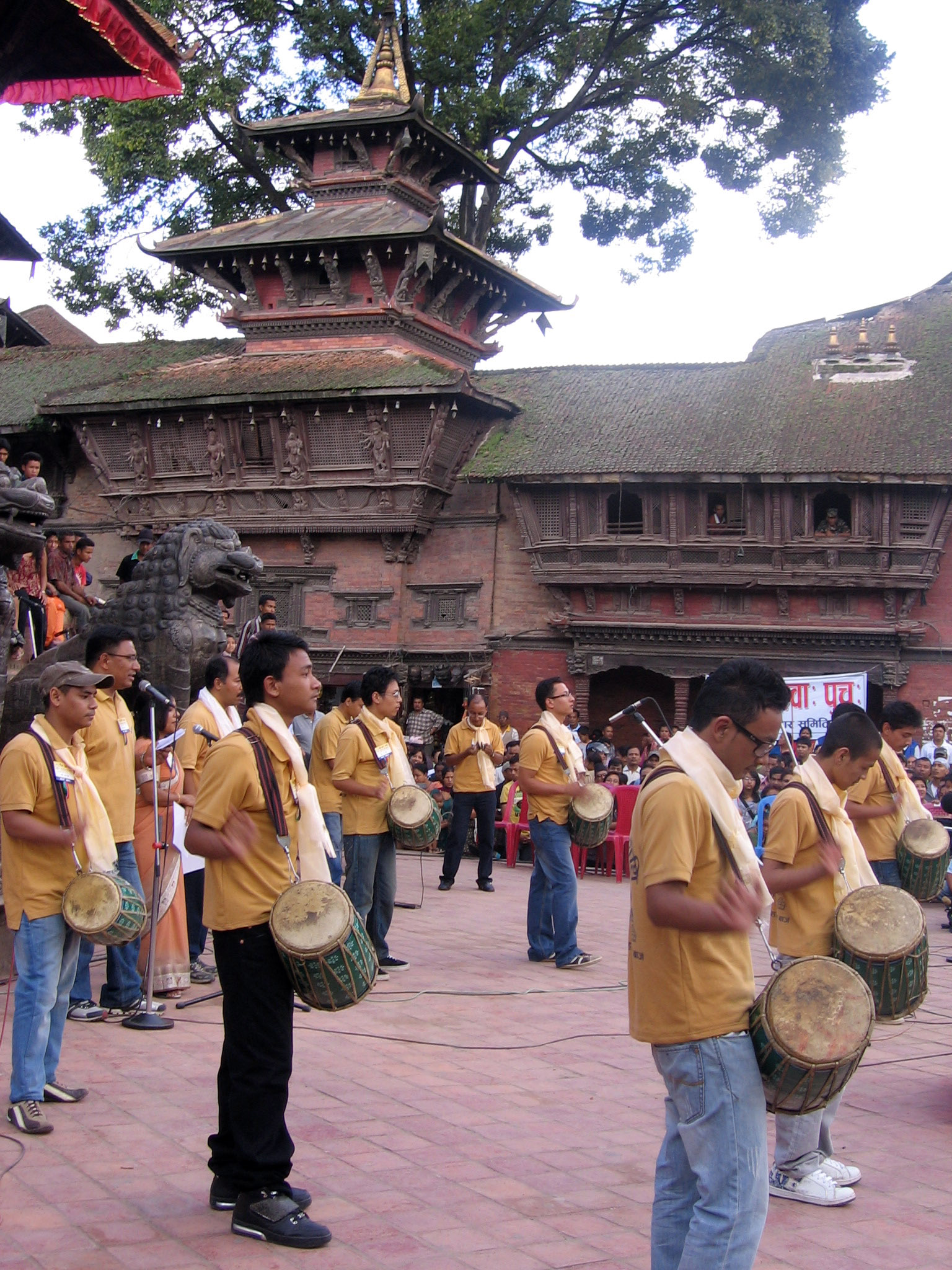
Kansakar Gunla Bajan band performing at Kathmandu Durbar Square.

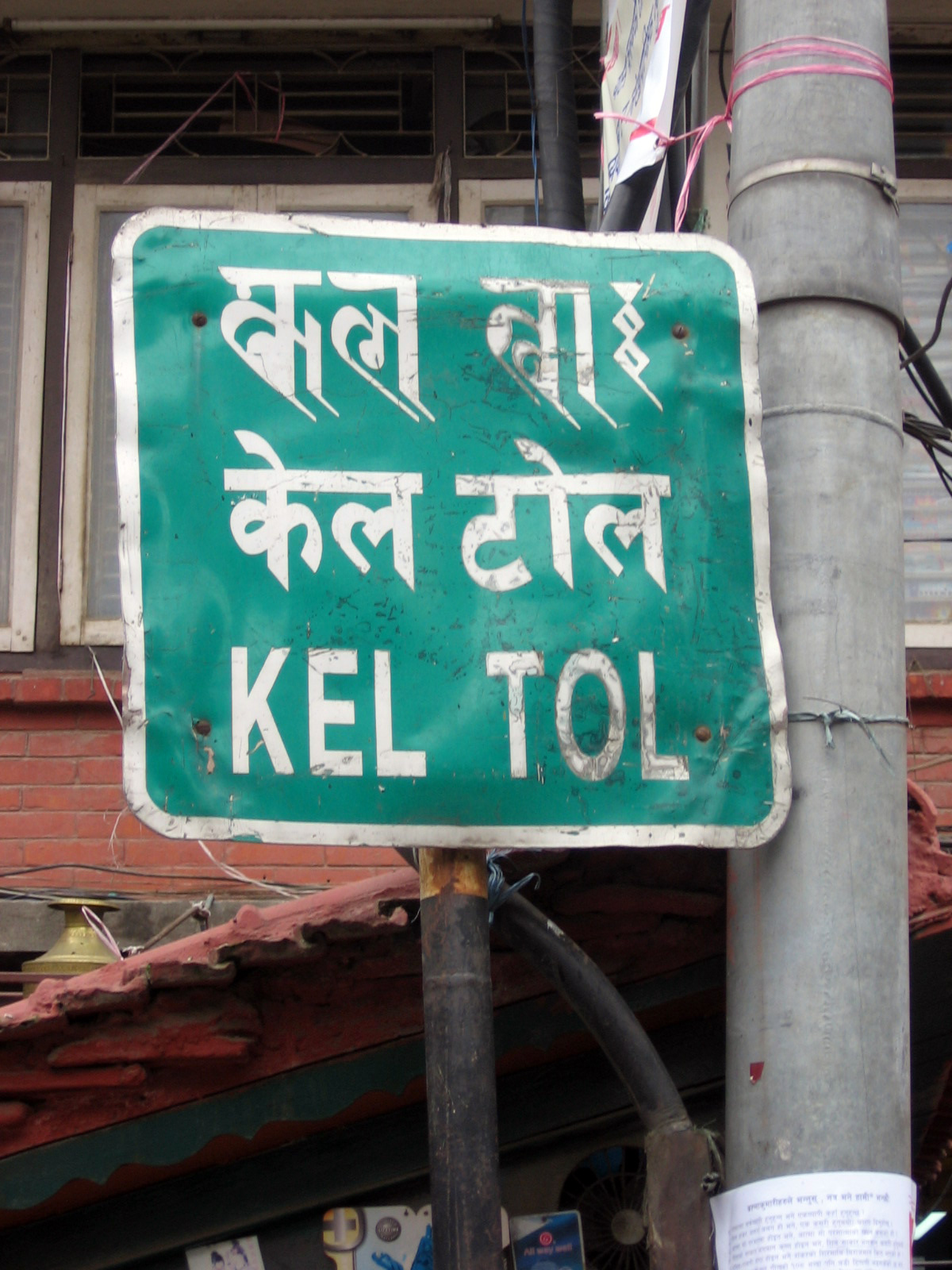
Kel Tol road sign

Kansakār (Nepali: कंसाकार) or Kasāh (कसाः) is a Nepalese caste group belonging to the Newar community of the Kathmandu Valley in Nepal. In Sanskrit, Kansakar means bronze worker, and their traditional occupation has been metal working and trading. Today, they are merchants, industrialists and professionals.

They are part of the Urāy (उराय्) group which includes Tuladhar, Tamrakar, Sthapit, Bania, Sindurakar, Selalik and other castes. The Urāy are a community of high-caste Buddhist merchants, and their family names indicate artisan and mercantile specialists. Their religion is Newar Buddhism and mother tongue Nepal Bhasa.

Kansakars have been traditionally based in Kel Tol in the historical section of Kathmandu where they play a major cultural role. The neighborhood is famed for the sacred courtyard of Jana Baha (Machhendra Bahal) where the central temple houses an image of Aryavalokitesvara (Sacred Avalokiteśvara), a Buddhist deity popularly known as Jana Baha Dyah or White Machhendranath (alternative name: White Karunamaya).

== Traditional occupation ==
According to the division of labour laid down from ancient times, Kansakars practiced the hereditary occupation of making utensils of bronze. Kitchen and ritual vessels, various types of dinner plates and cymbals are their main products. A dinner plate with a grooved border known as siphala dema (सिफाला देमा) is their specialty. Bronze is made in their workshops by melting copper and tin and mixing them in a charcoal-fired furnace.

They were also major players in the traditional Tibet trade, and maintained business houses in Lhasa in Tibet and in Kalimpong and Kolkata in India.

== Cultural life ==
Kansakars participate in the annual chariot procession of Aryavalokitesvara which is known as Jana Baha Dyah Jatra by playing long horns. The Kansakar Gunla Bajan musical band organizes performances of religious music during the whole month of Gunla and other festivals.

The 12-yearly Samyak is the most spectacular Newar Buddhist festival held in Kathmandu where statues of Dipankara Buddha are displayed. Each Urāy caste has been assigned a duty in the festival from ancient times, and Kansakars have the task of preparing and serving five types of foods.

Kansakars participate in the Kumha Pyakhan dance (also known as Kumar Pyakhan) which is held annually during the Mohani festival in October on the open-air dance platform at Asan and at Kathmandu Durbar Square. A young Tuladhar or Kansakar boy is chosen to be the dancer.

== Notable Kansakars ==
- Bhaju Ratna Kansakar (1882-1956), trader and philanthropist
- Daya Bir Singh Kansakar (1911-2001), social worker
- Gyan Jyoti Kansakar (1921-2004), President of the International Buddhist Meditation Center, trader, benefactor and industrialist
- Maniharsha Jyoti (1917-1993), trader and industrialist
- Vidya Bir Singh Kansakar (1948-present), Socialist
- Prem Bahadur Kansakar (1918-1991), freedom fighter, author and language activist
- Vidyabati Kansakar (1906-1976), pioneer of nursing
- Yogbir Singh Kansakar (1885-1942), poet
- Prasan Bir Singh Kansakar
- Kamal Bir Singh Kansakar

== See also ==
- Lhasa Newar (trans-Himalayan traders)
- Gunla Bajan music
- Kumha Pyakhan dance
