= Newar art =

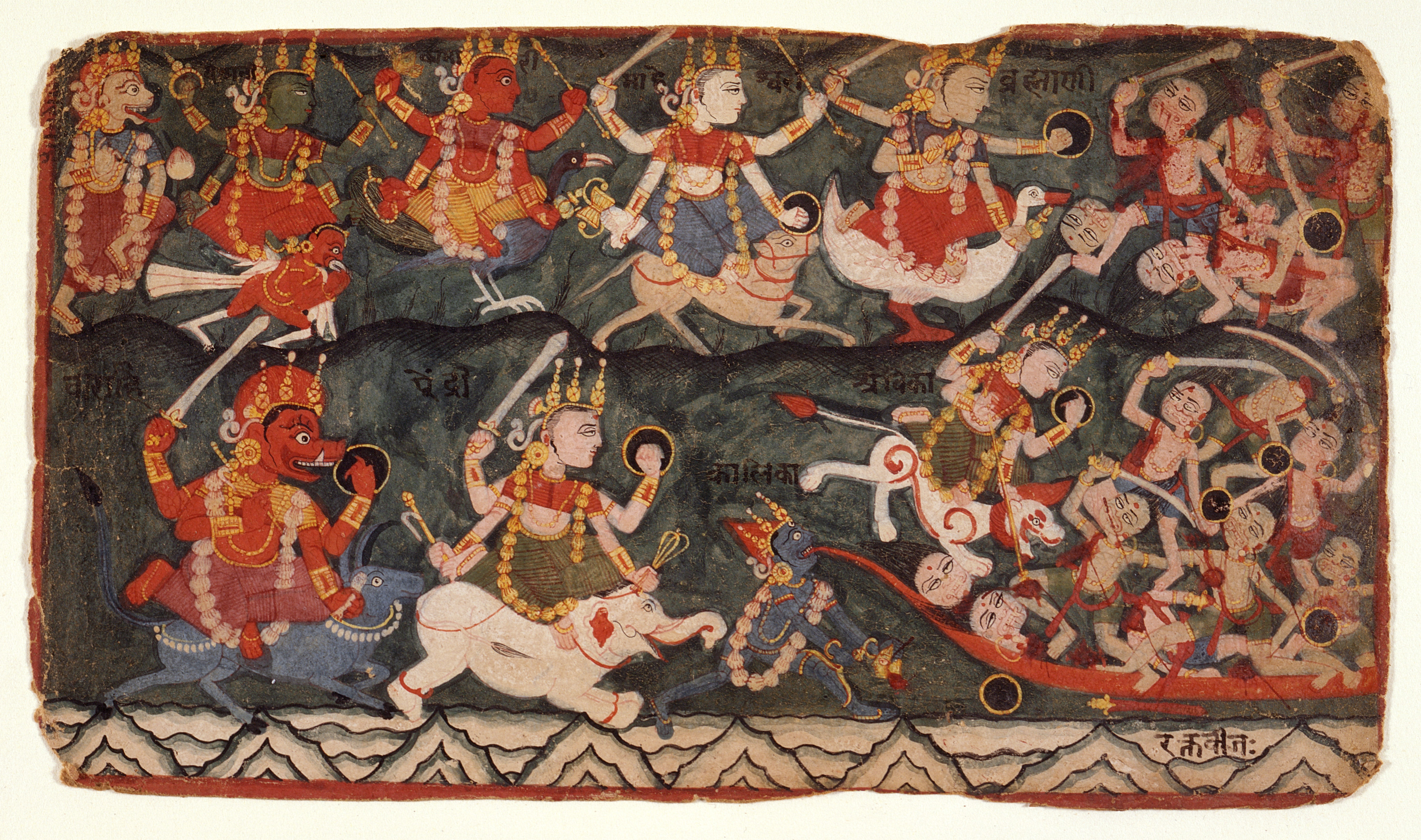
Newar art depicting Ajima

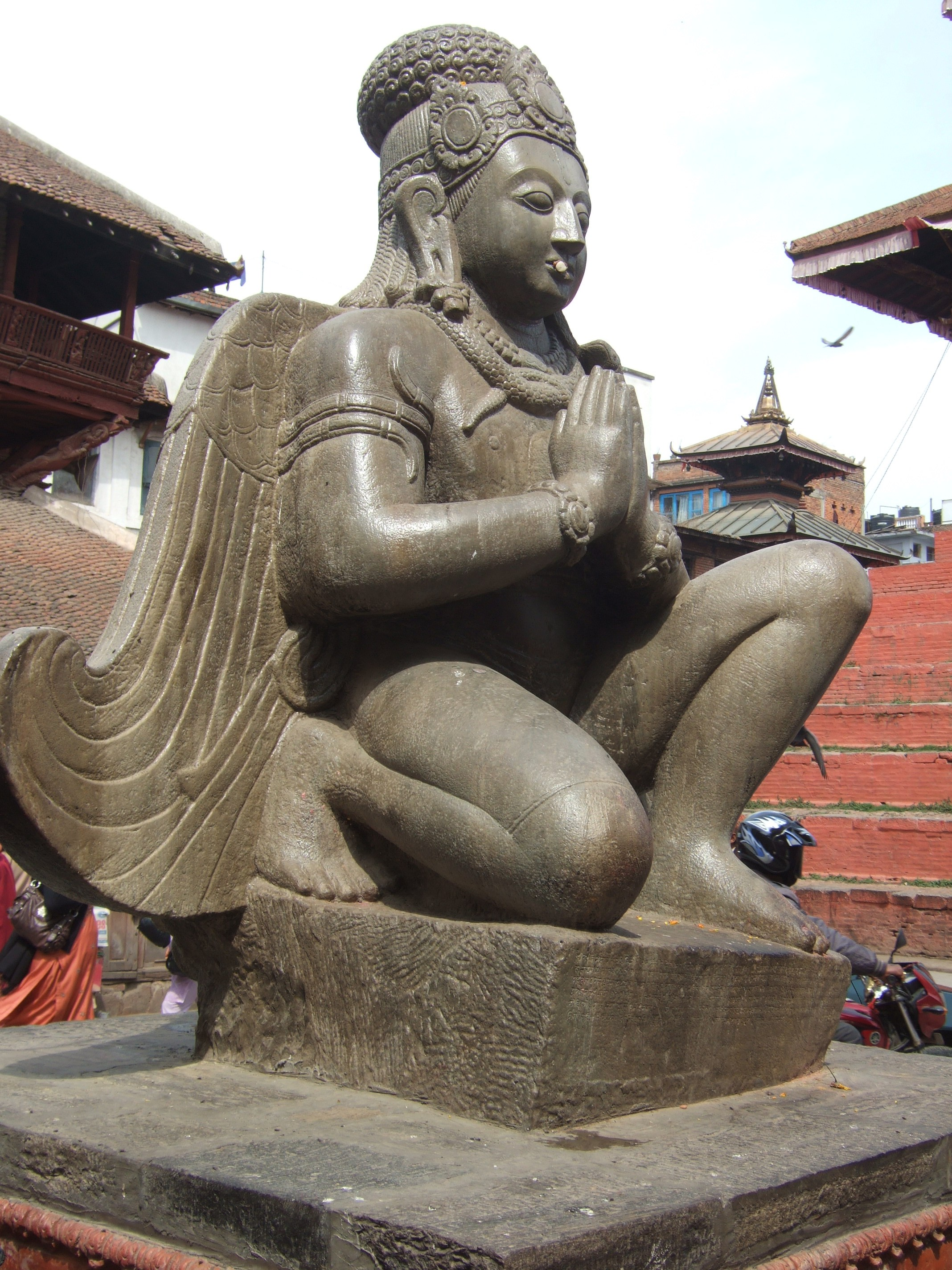
Sculpture of Garuda

Newar art is the art form practiced over centuries by Newar people. The pictorial art consists of:

- Paubha
- Wall paintings (murals)
- Paintings on the walls of temples
- Paintings in manuscripts (books)
- Copper and brass sculptures
- Stone sculptures
- Wooden sculptures

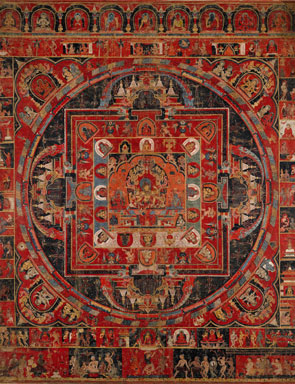
Vasudhara Mandala, by Jasaraja Jirili, Nepal, dated 1365.

The Newars are the creators of most examples of art and architecture in Nepal. Traditional Newar art is basically religious art. Newar devotional paubha painting, sculpture and metal craftsmanship are world-renowned for their exquisite beauty. The earliest dated paubha discovered so far is Vasudhara Mandala which was painted in 1365 AD (Nepal Sambat 485). The murals on the walls of two 15th-century monasteries in the former kingdom of Mustang in the Nepal Himalaya provide illustrations of Newar works outside the Kathmandu Valley. Stone sculpture, wood carving, repoussé art and metal statues of Buddhist and Hindu deities made by the lost-wax casting process are specimens of Newar artistry. The Peacock Window of Bhaktapur and Desay Madu Jhya of Kathmandu are known for their wood carving.

Building elements like the carved Newar window, roof struts on temples and the tympanum of temples and shrine houses exhibit traditional creativity. From as early as the seventh century, visitors have noted the skill of Newar artists and craftsmen who left their influence on the art of Tibet and China. Newars introduced the lost-wax technique into Bhutan and they were commissioned to paint murals on the walls of monasteries there. Sandpainting of mandala made during festivals and death rituals is another specialty of Newar art.

Besides exhibiting a high level of skill in traditional religious art, Newar artists have been at the forefront in introducing Western art styles in Nepal. Raj Man Singh Chitrakar (1797-1865) is credited with starting watercolor painting in the country. Bhaju Man Chitrakar (1817–1874), Tej Bahadur Chitrakar (1898-1971) and Chandra Man Singh Maskey were other pioneer artists who introduced modern style paintings incorporating concepts of lighting and perspective.

Paubhas or thangkas were traditionally painted by Chitrakars.

== See also ==
- Newar people
- Nepal Bhasa
- Thangka
- Newar architecture
- Chitrakar
- Newar dance
- Newar music
- Lhasa Newar
