= Durbar Square =

Plazas by the old royal palaces in Nepal

Coordinates: 27°42′17″N 85°18′27″E

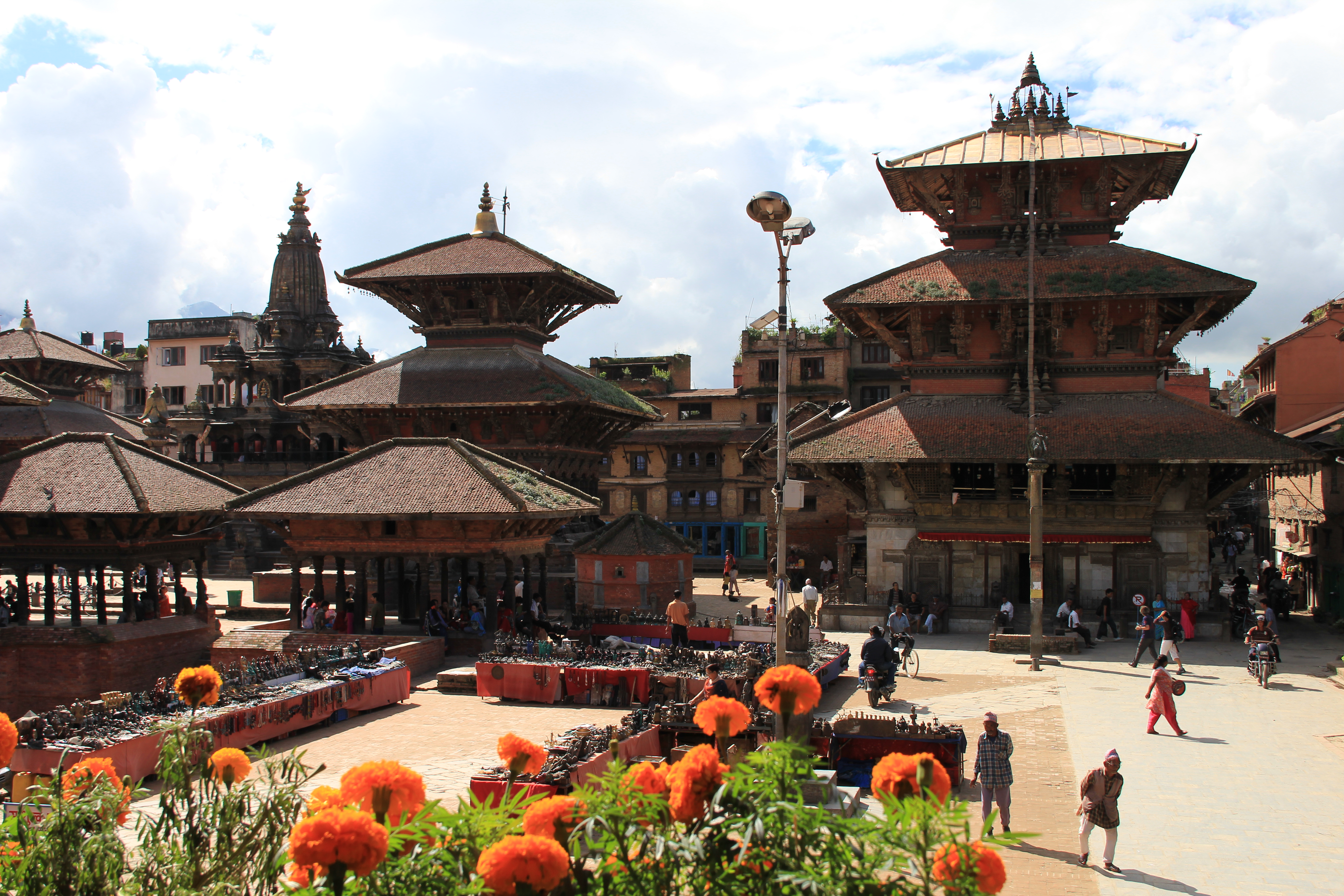
Patan Durbar Square in 2010

Map

Durbar Square or Royal Square in English, is the generic name that refers to the plazas and areas opposite the old royal palaces in Nepal. The name comes from Persian دربار (Darbar). The durbar squares are full of temples, idols, open courts, water fountains and much more. Before the Unification of Nepal, Nepal consisted of smaller independent kingdoms, and Durbar Squares are some prominent remnants of those old kingdoms in Nepal. There are three Durbar Squares in the Kathmandu Valley, belonging to the three Newar kingdoms who were situated there before unification, are most famous: Kathmandu Durbar Square, Patan Durbar Square, and Bhaktapur Durbar Square. All three of these landmarks are UNESCO World Heritage Sites. These sites had received significant damage due to the devastating earthquake of 2015 but most structures still remain or were reconstructed.

== Gallery ==
Durbar Square in 1988

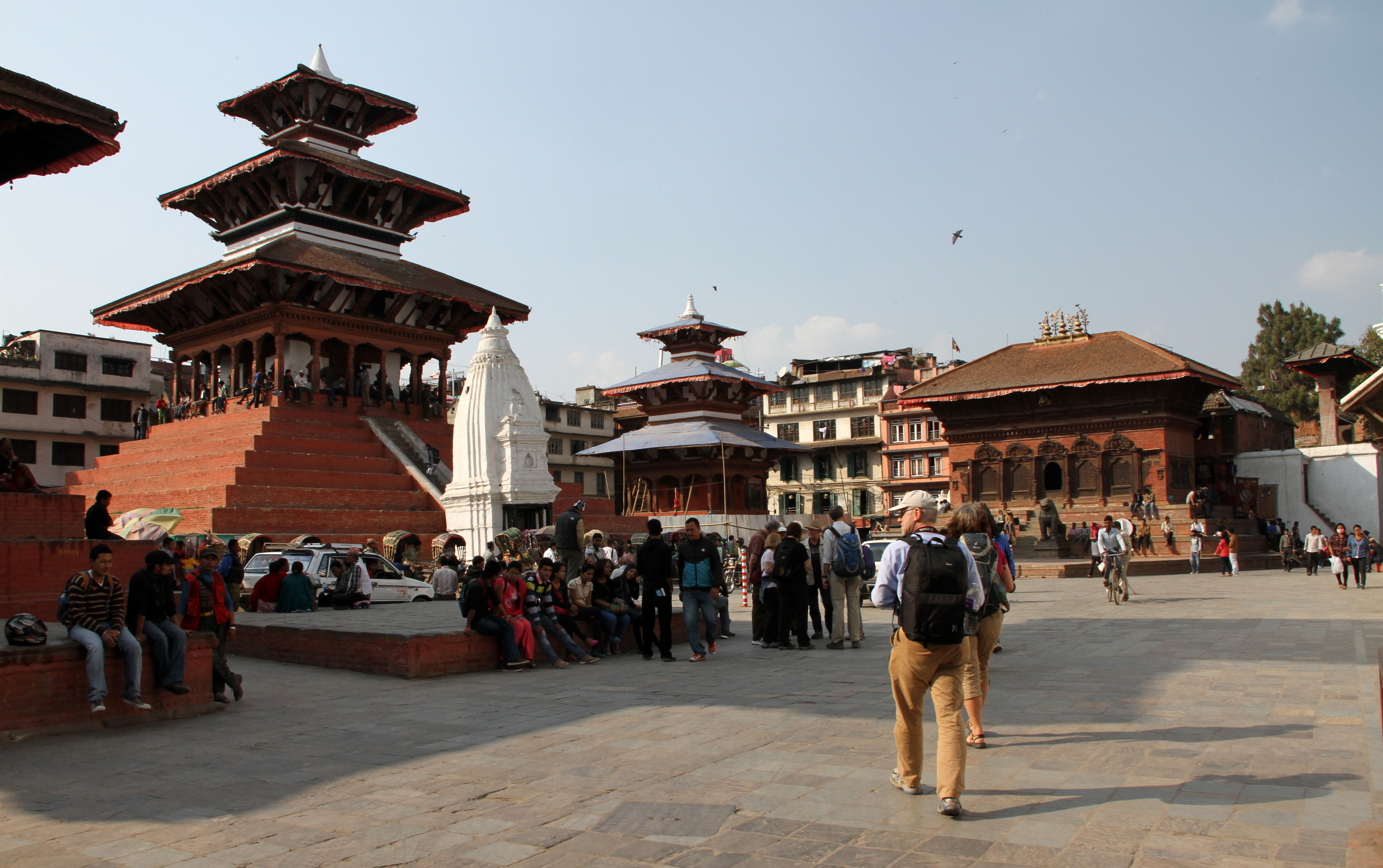
Maju Dega-Narayana-Shiva Parvati

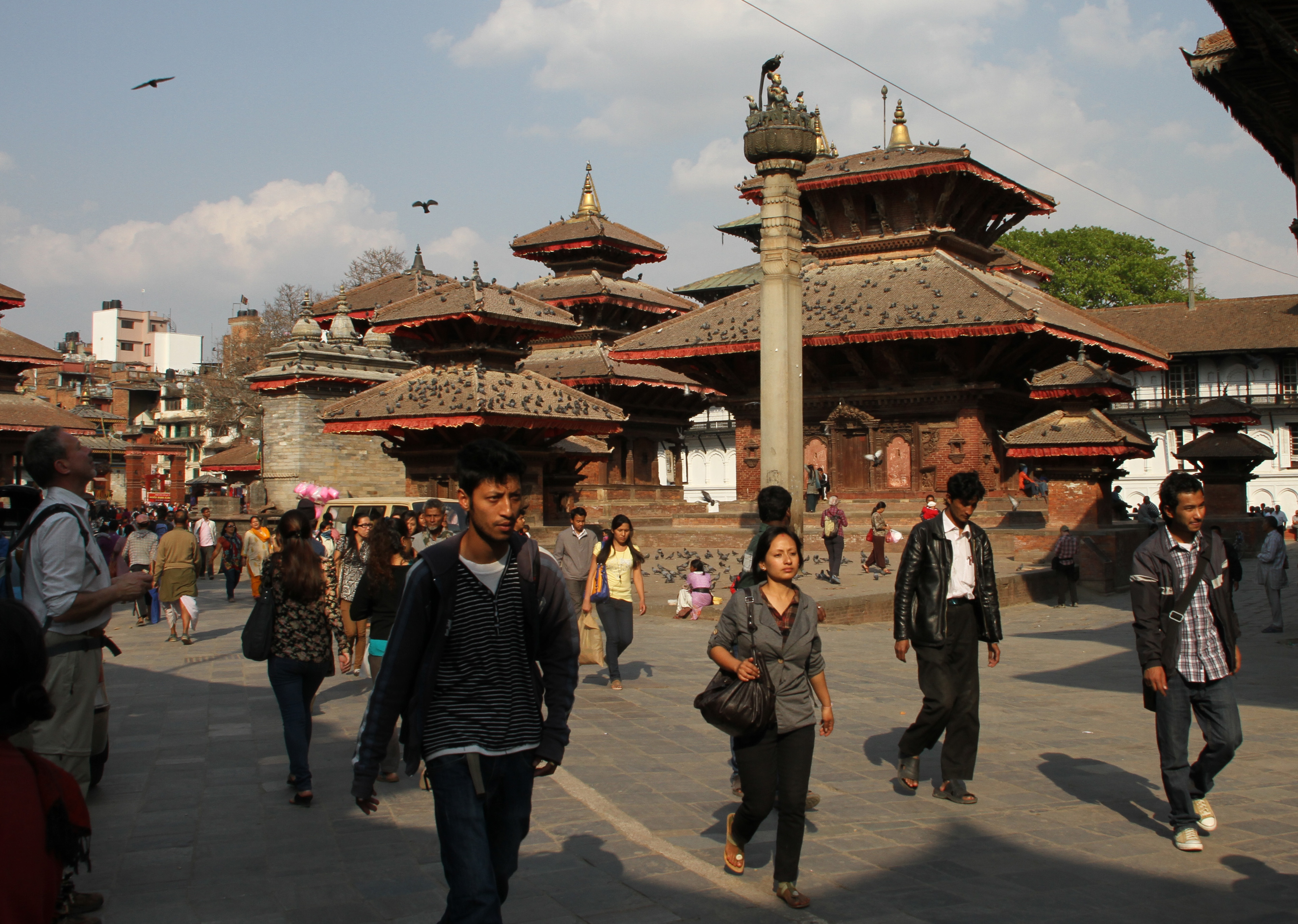
Pratapamalla-Jagannath

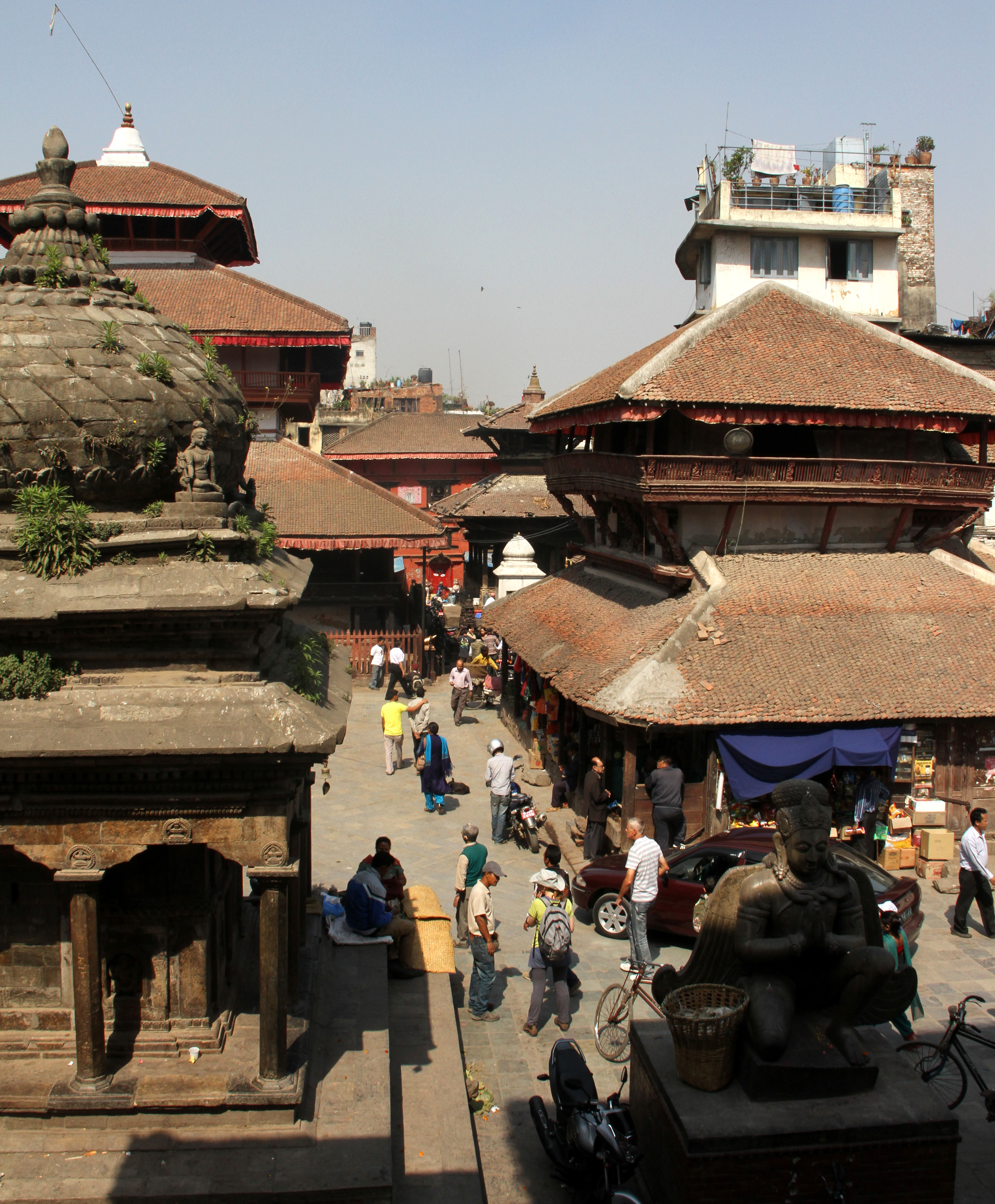
Bhimeshwara-Garuda

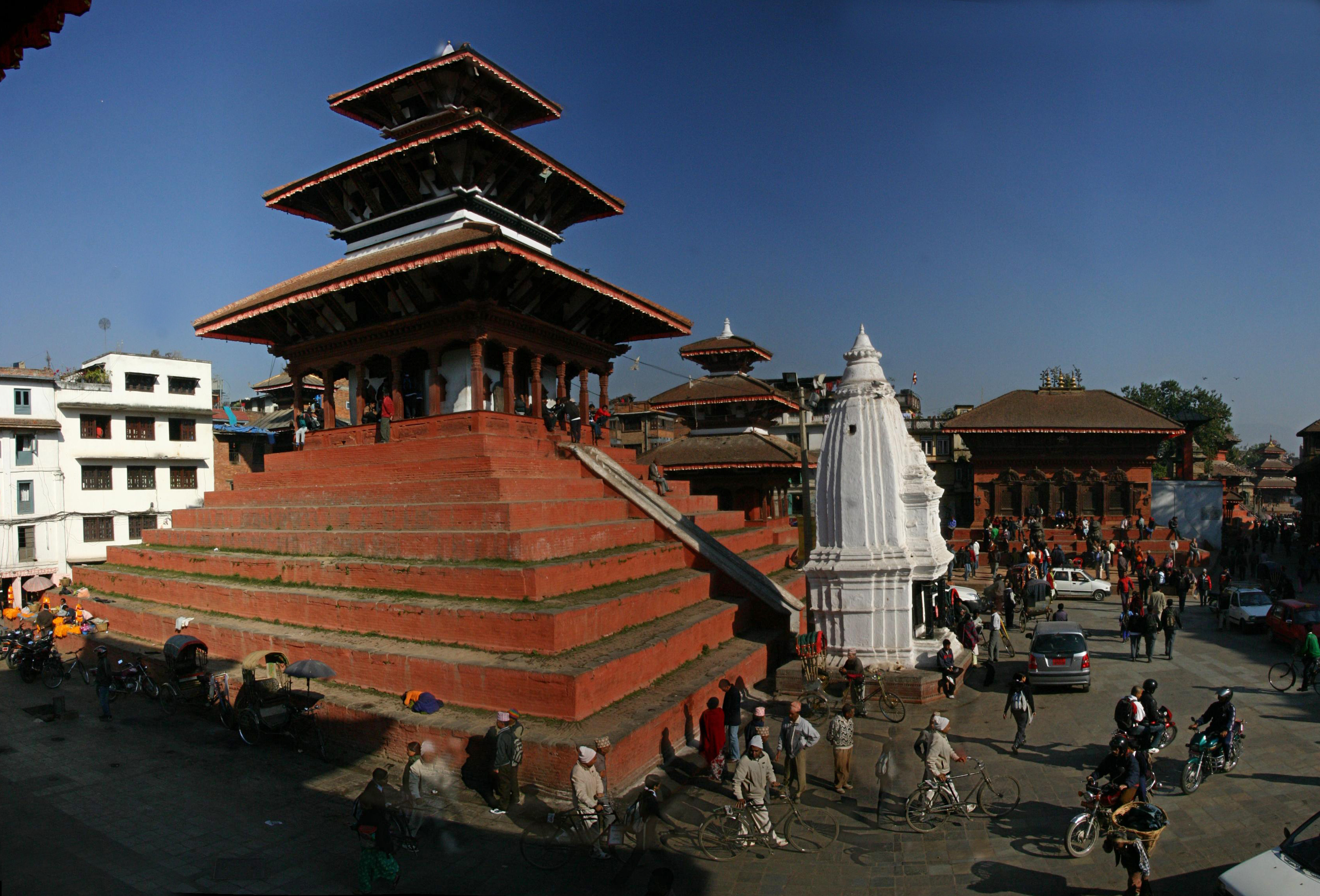
Maju Dega-Kamadev

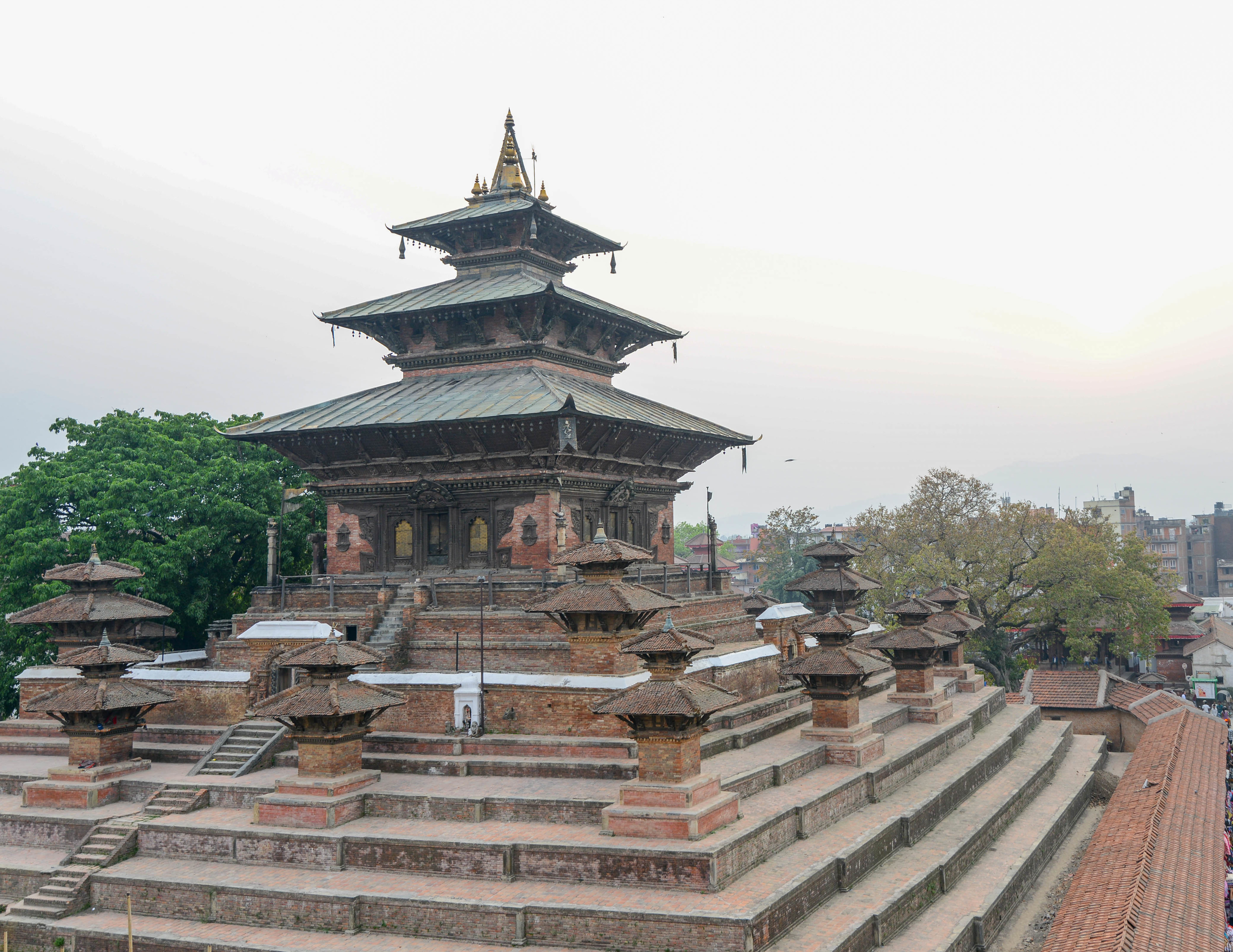
Taleju

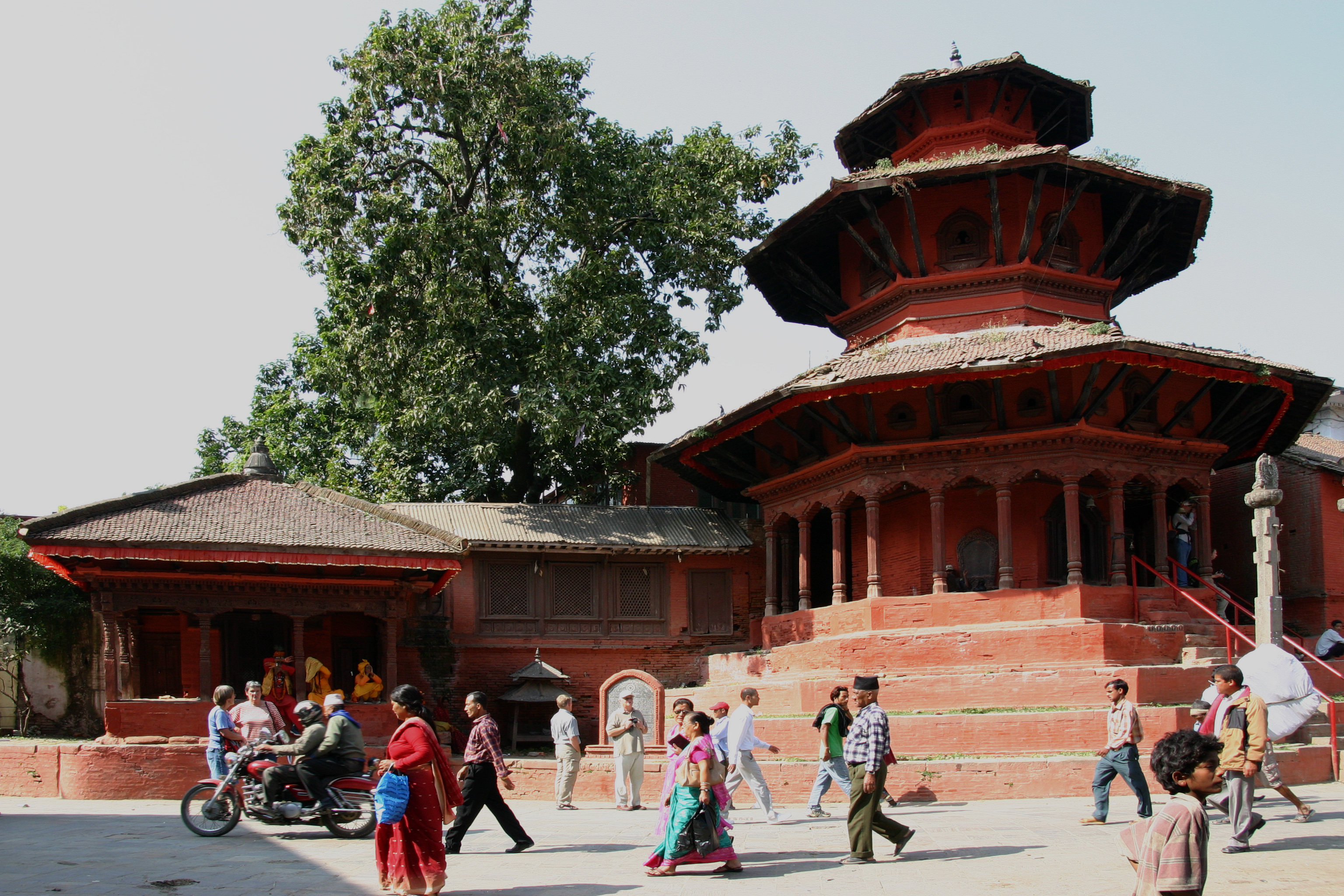
Saraswati-Chyasin Dega

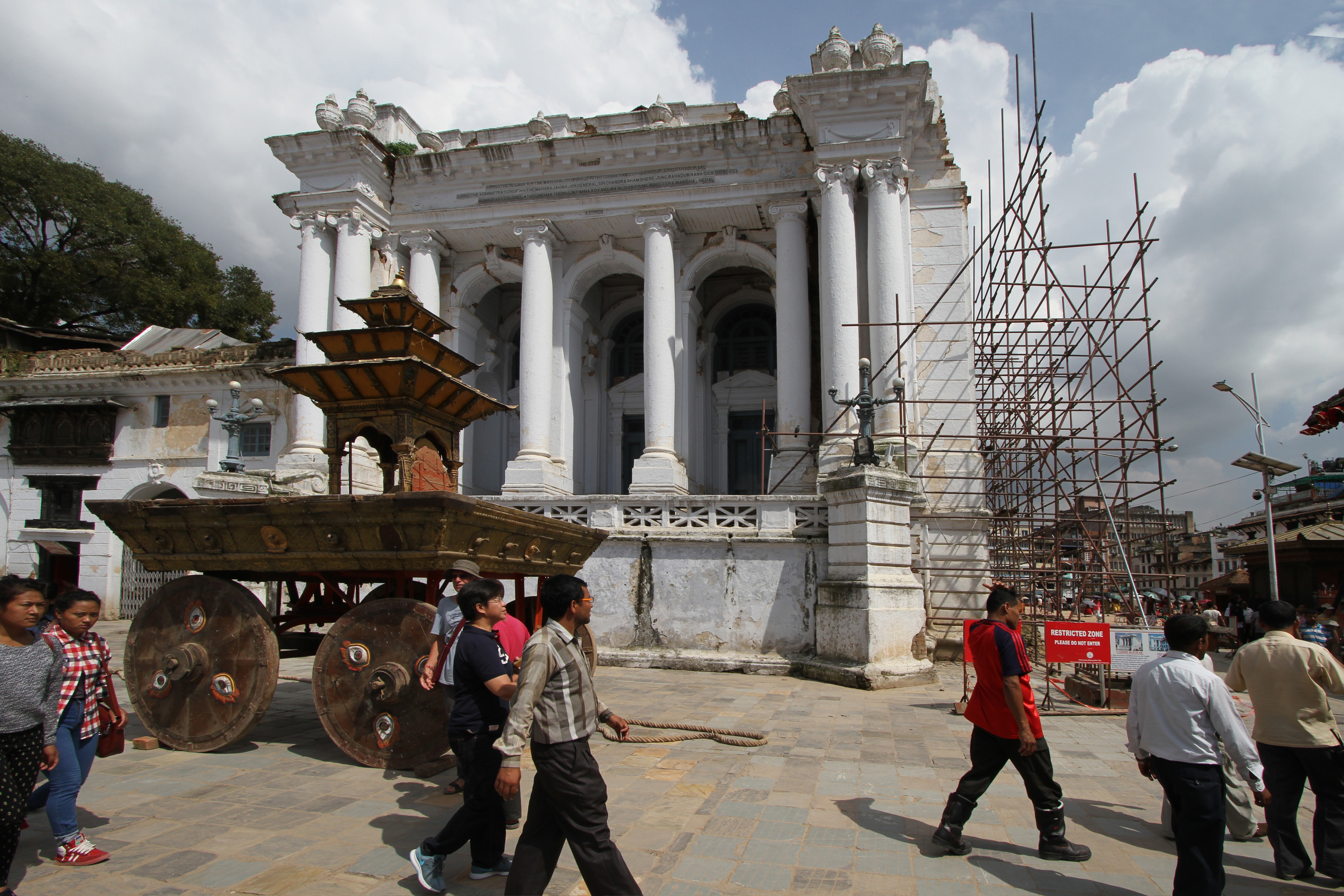
Gaddi Baithak

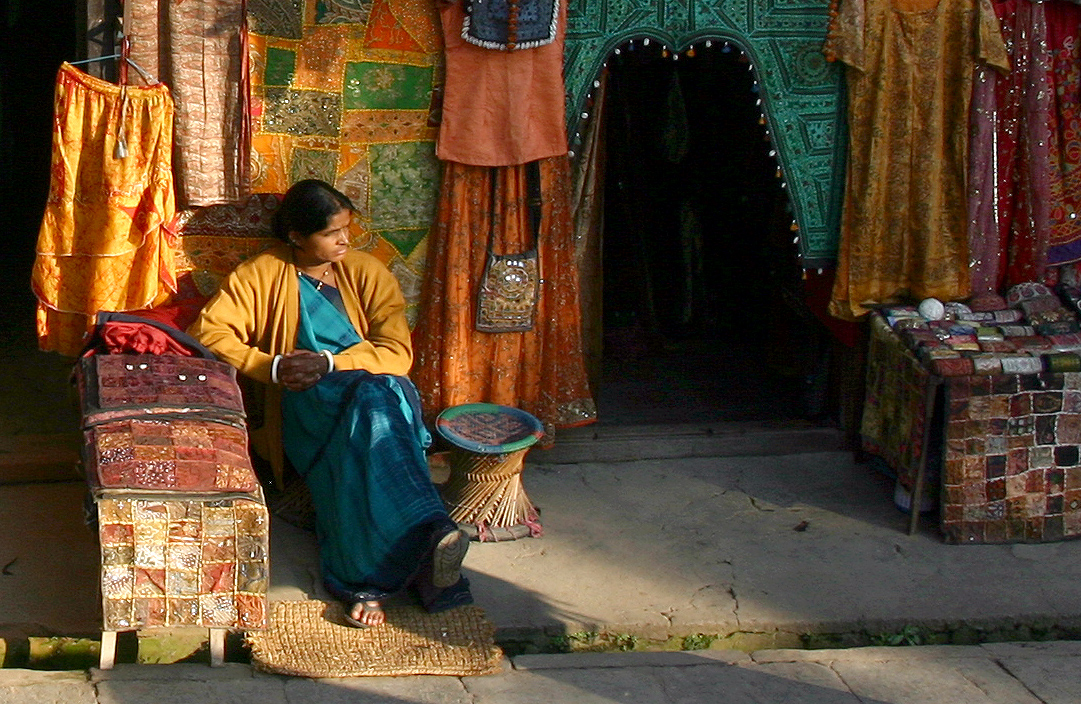
Souvenirs

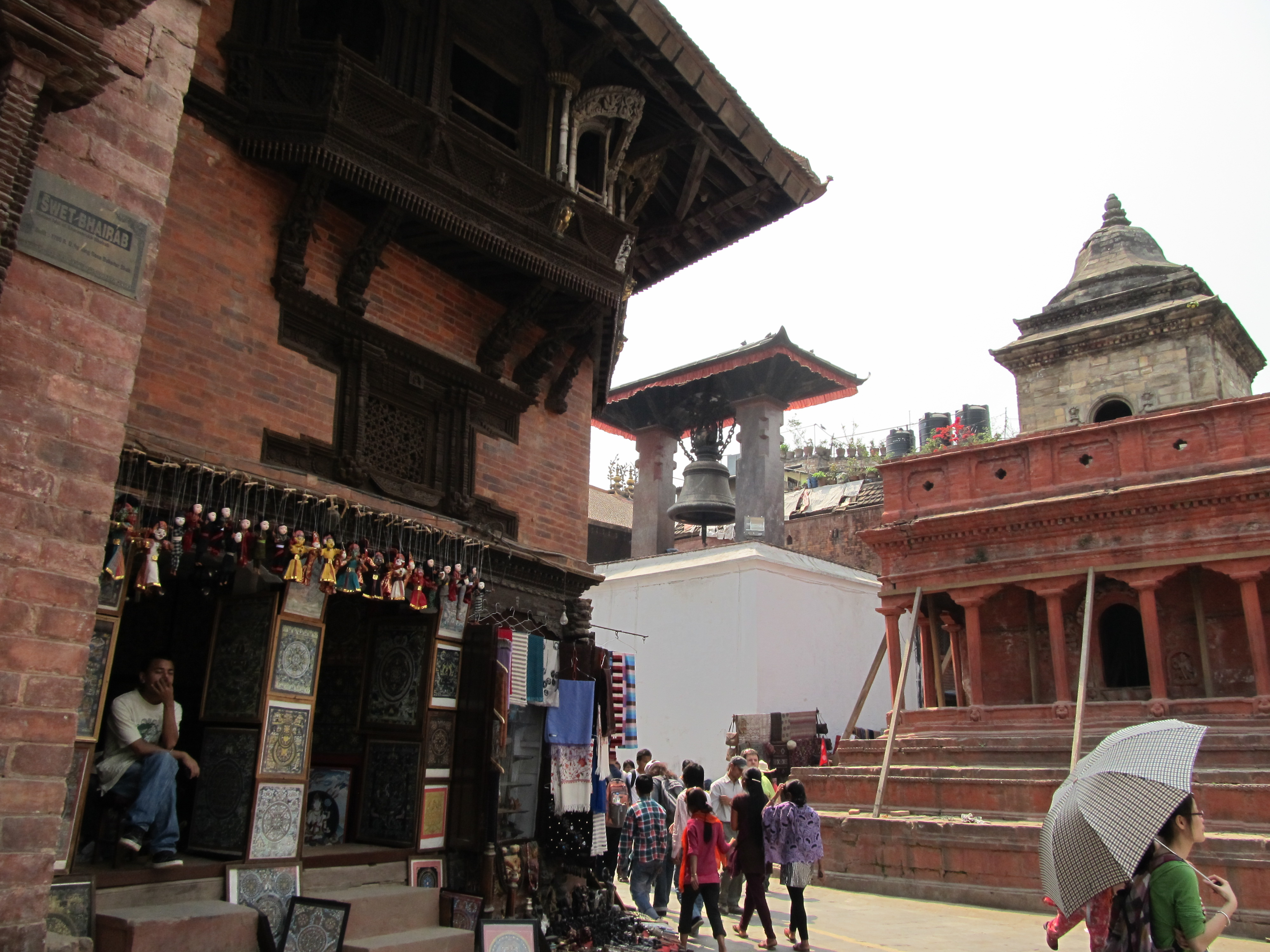
Bhagwati Temple (left), Big Bell or Taleju Bell, small Vishnu Temple (right), Kathmandu

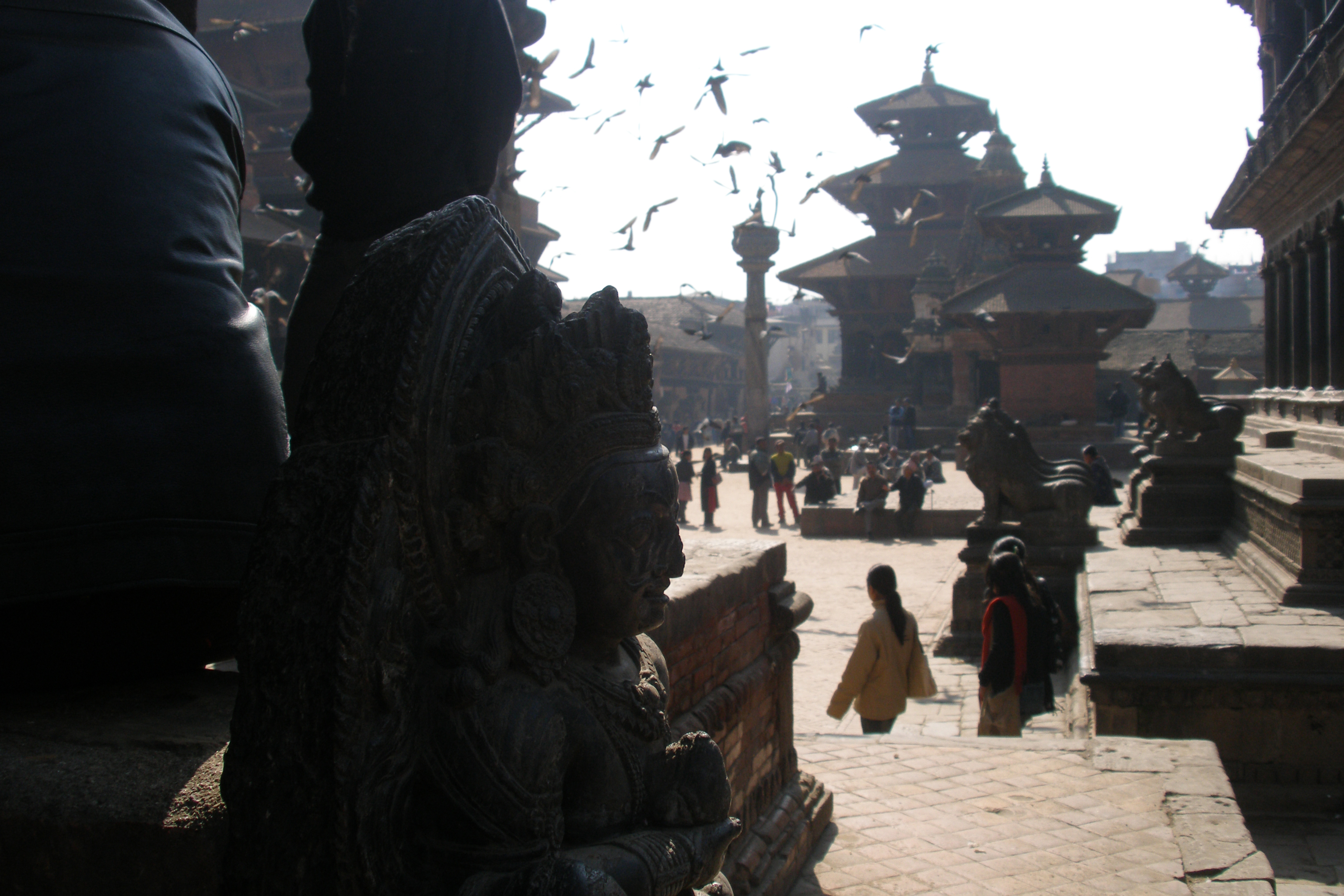
Patan Durbar Square

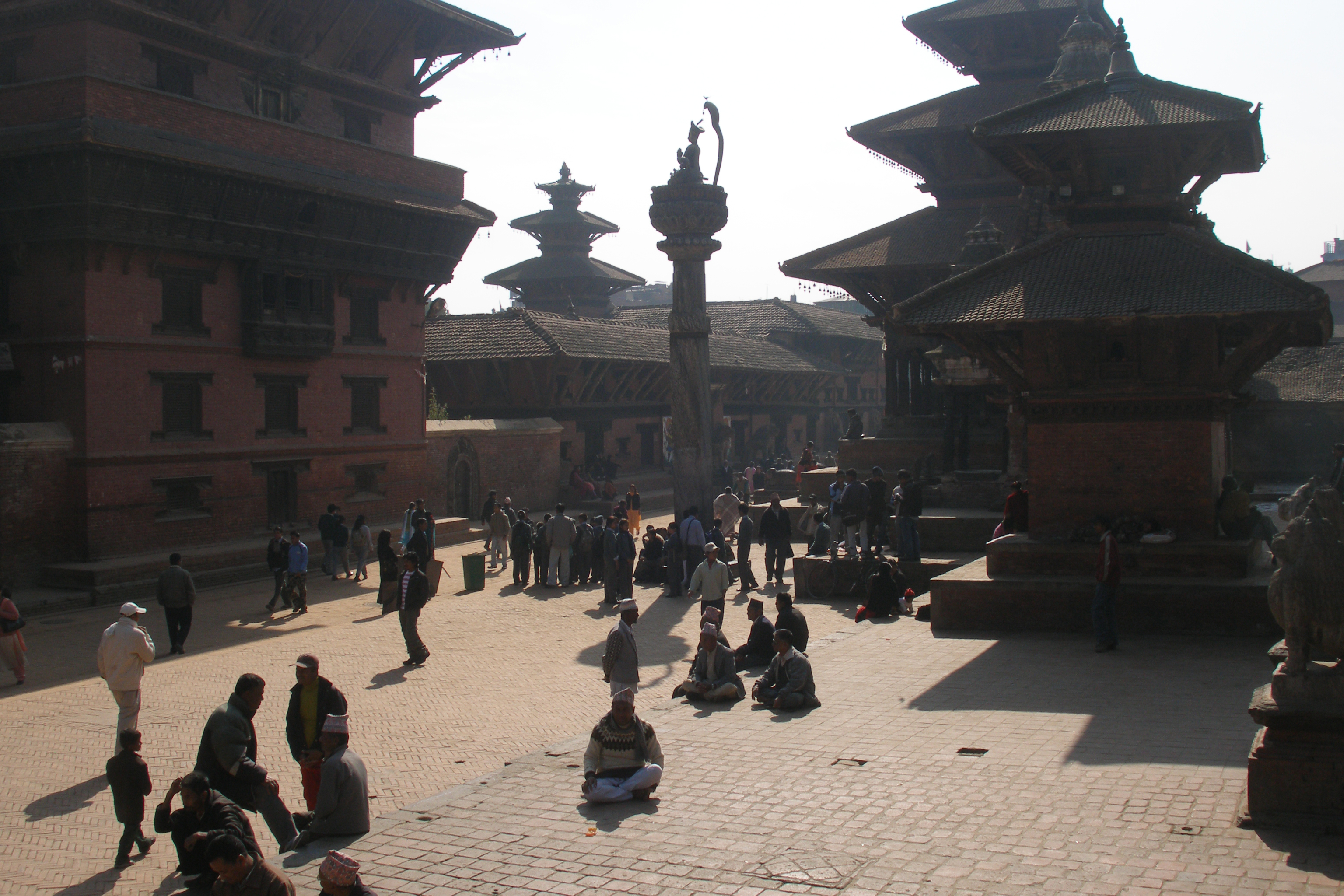
Patan Durbar Square

== See also ==
- Durbar (court)
- Kathmandu Durbar Square
- Patan Durbar Square
- Bhaktapur Durbar Square
- Media related to Durbar Square at Wikimedia Commons
