= Gaddi Baithak =

Neoclassical palace in Kathmandu

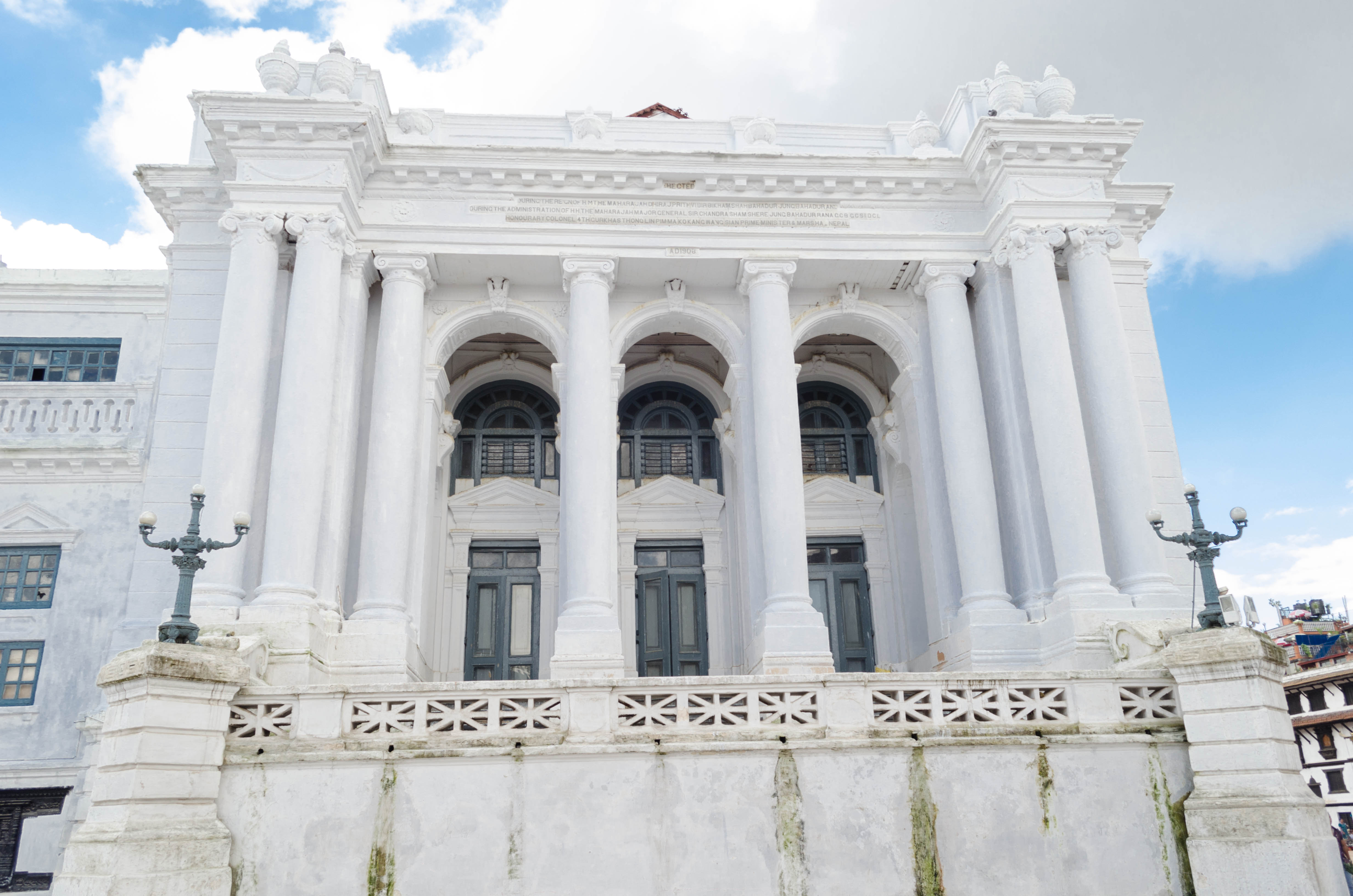

General information
- Location: Kathmandu Durbar Square, Kathmandu, Nepal
- Coordinates: 27.704011262751994°N 85.30673947910392°E

Gaddi Baithak is a historical palace in Kathmandu Durbar Square. It was built by Chandra Shumsher Jang Bahadur Rana in 1908, and it was used for coronations and to welcome head of states from other countries. It has been renovated 2 times so far due to extensive damage during earthquakes.

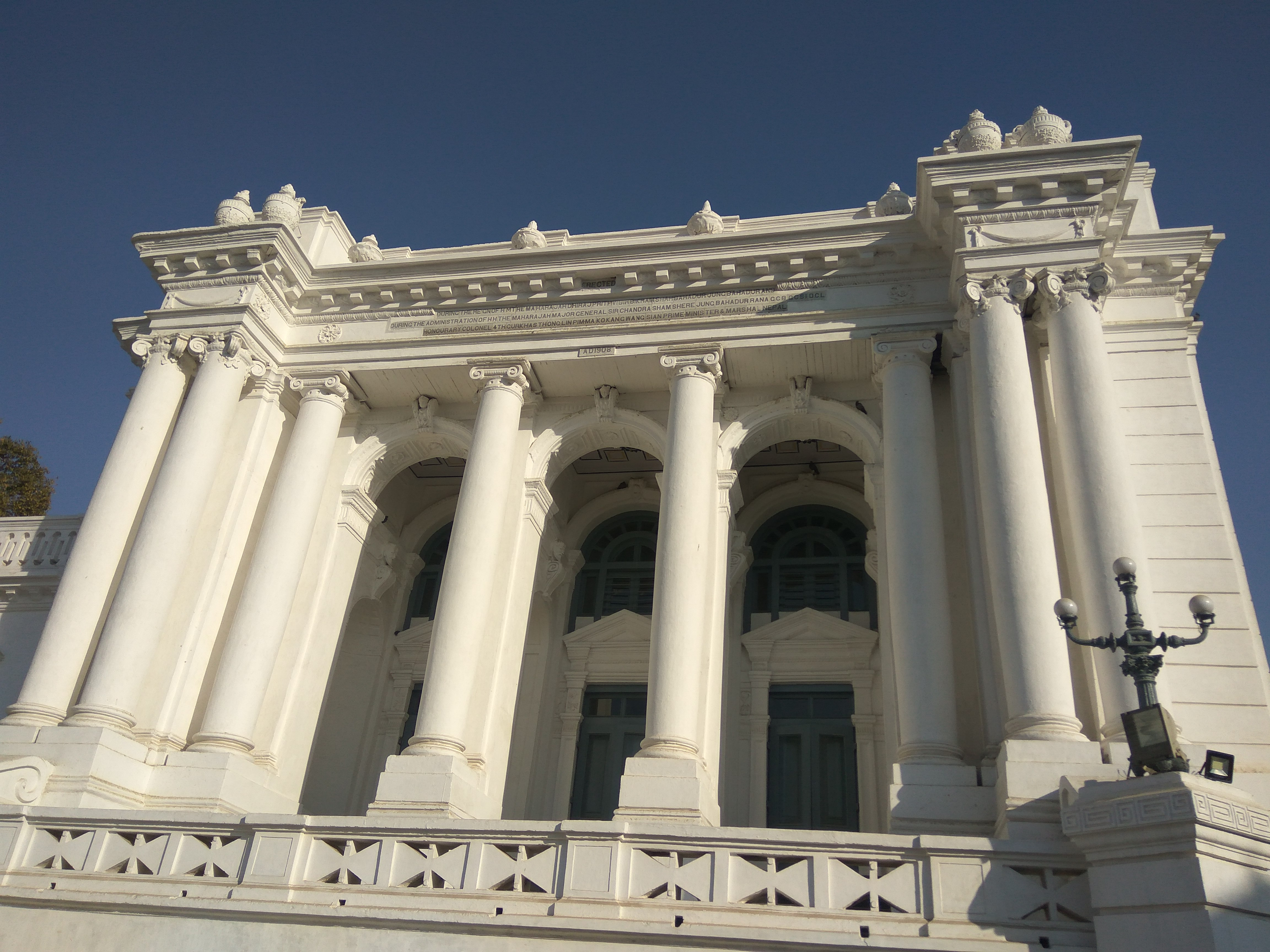
Gaddi Baithak after restoration
