= Nautalle Durbar =

- नौतले दरबार
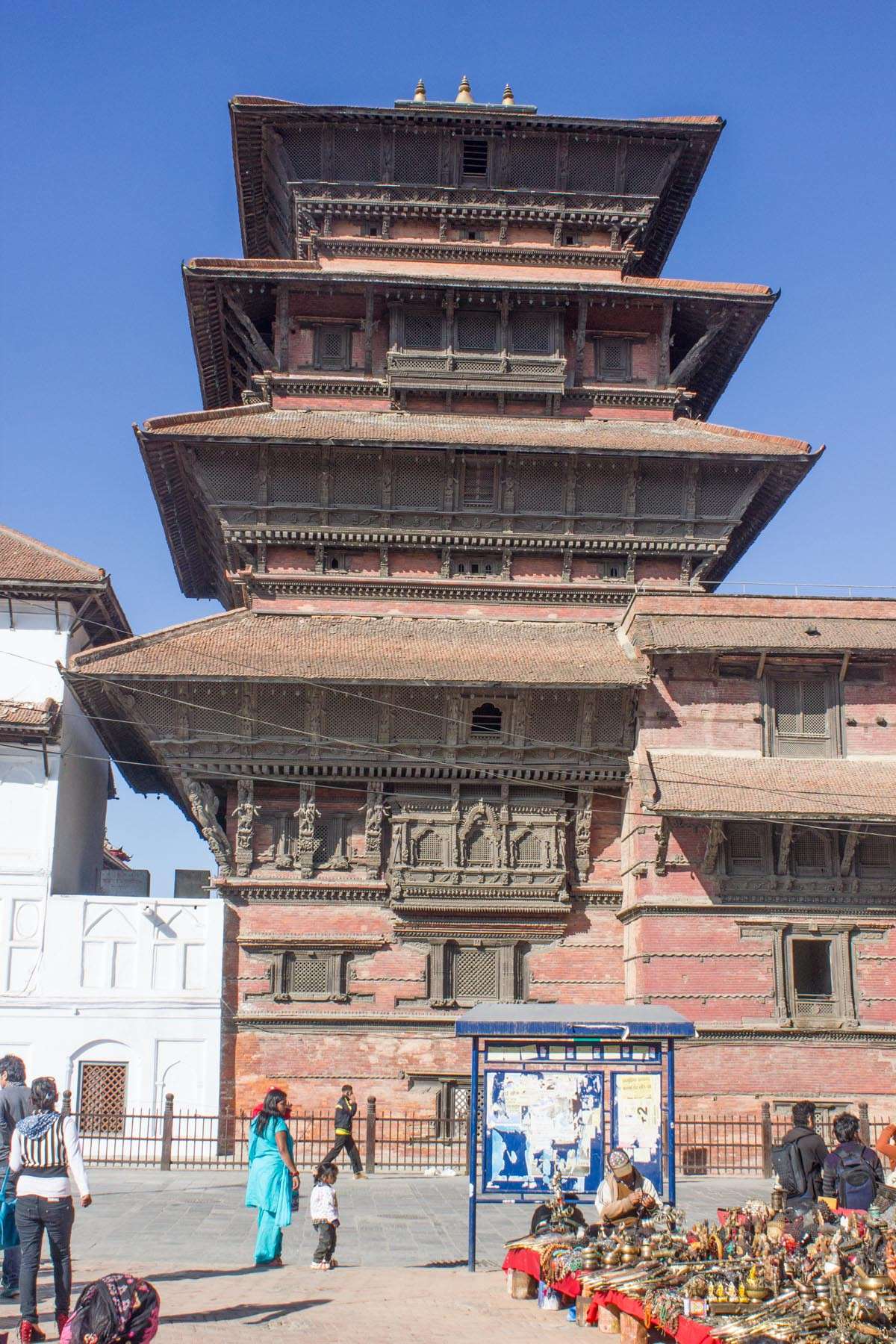
- Nautalle Durbar in 2014

- Location within Bagmati Province Nautalle Durbar (Nepal)
- Alternative names: Basantapur Tower

General information
- Location: Hanuman Dhoka, Kathmandu Durbar Square
- Coordinates: 27.703881611584134°N 85.30747693218386°E

Nautalle Durbar (Nepali: नौतले दरबार; sometimes known as Basantapur Durbar (Nepali: बसंतपुर दरबार)) is a palace in Hanuman Dhoka, Kathmandu Durbar Square.

It was built by Prithvi Narayan Shah to commemorate the Unification of Nepal. During the April 2015 Nepal earthquake, the top tiers collapsed.

Nautalle Durbar also served as the early residence of the King of Nepal.

The Nautalle Durbar is an important and iconic structure in Kathmandu, which is one of the ancient cities of the Kathmandu Valley. The palace is famous for its nine stories (hence "Nautalle" meaning "nine-story"), and it has been an important part of the history and architecture of the Kathmandu Valley.
