= Newar window =

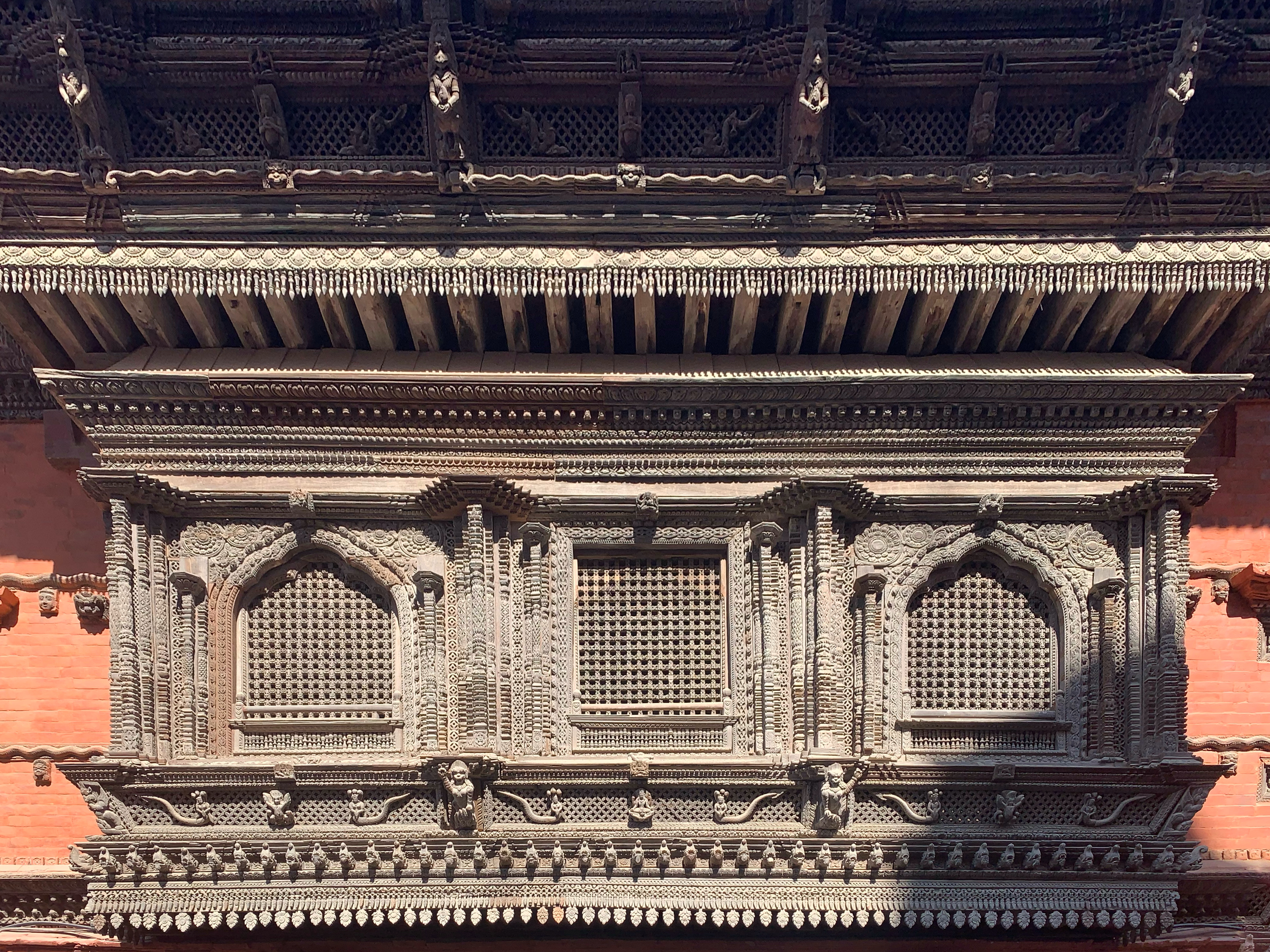
A Newar window panel at Hanuman Dhoka, Kathmandu

Newār window (Nepali: नेवार झ्याल; newār jhyāl) refers to the elaborately carved wooden window which is the distinguishing feature of traditional Newa architecture. The ornate windows have been described as a symbol of Newar culture and artistry. The level of design and carving of the Newar window reached its peak in the mid-18th century. They are found on palaces, private residences and sacred houses across Nepal Mandala.

The lintel, sill and jamb are ornamented with figures of deities, mythical beings, dragons, peacocks, auspicious jars and other elements. The window is surmounted by ritual parasols. Traditional Newar houses are usually of four storeys and built of brick. Different types of windows are used on each floor according to their function.

Newar windows and bare-brick facade in the traditional style are making a comeback as an architectural trend due to the tourism industry and growing heritage awareness.

== Types of windows ==
Among the many window designs, the following are the most common:

- Sanjhyā (Devanagari: सँझ्या:) is a projecting bay window and the classic Newar window. A typical Sanjhyā consists of three units and is located in the center of a facade. The shutter consists of a lattice and opens upwards. It is usually located on the third floor.
- Tikijhya(तिकिझ्या:) is a lattice window and the most common window in traditional architecture. It is located on the second floor. The window allows light and air to enter the room but does not permit a passerby to see inside.
- Gājhyā (गा:झ्या:) is a projecting window located under a roof.
- Pāsukhā Jhyā (पासुखा झ्या:) is a small window with five units symbolizing the Pancha Buddha (Five Buddhas). It is mostly found on the shrine house of monasteries.
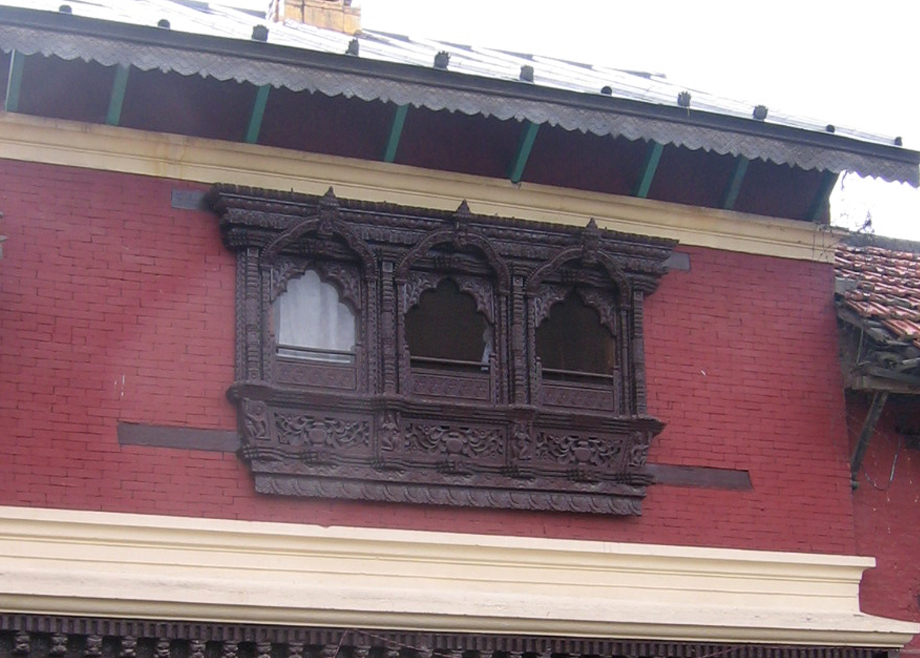
Sanjhyā, Kindo Baha, Kathmandu

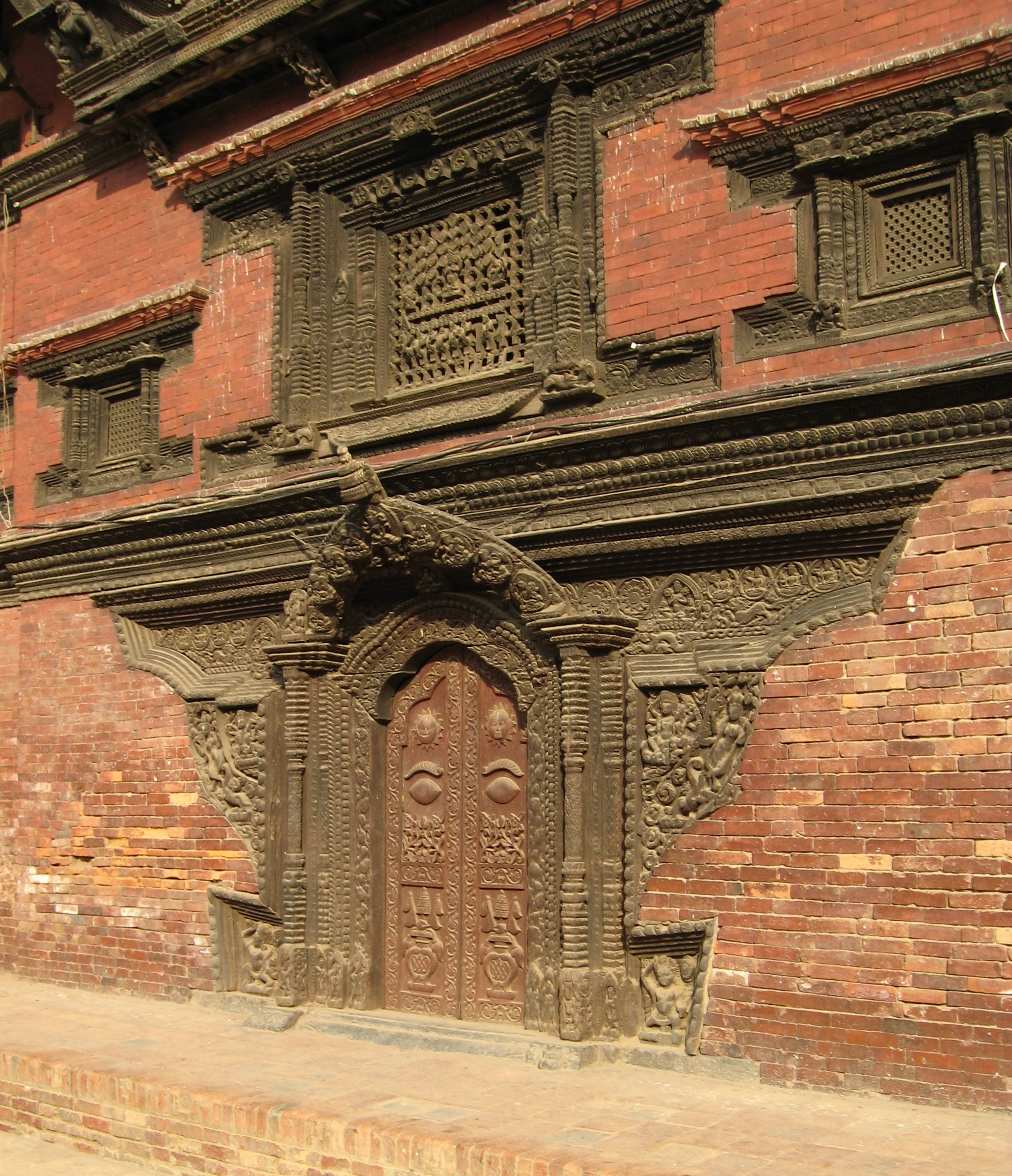
Tikijhyā, Patan Durbar

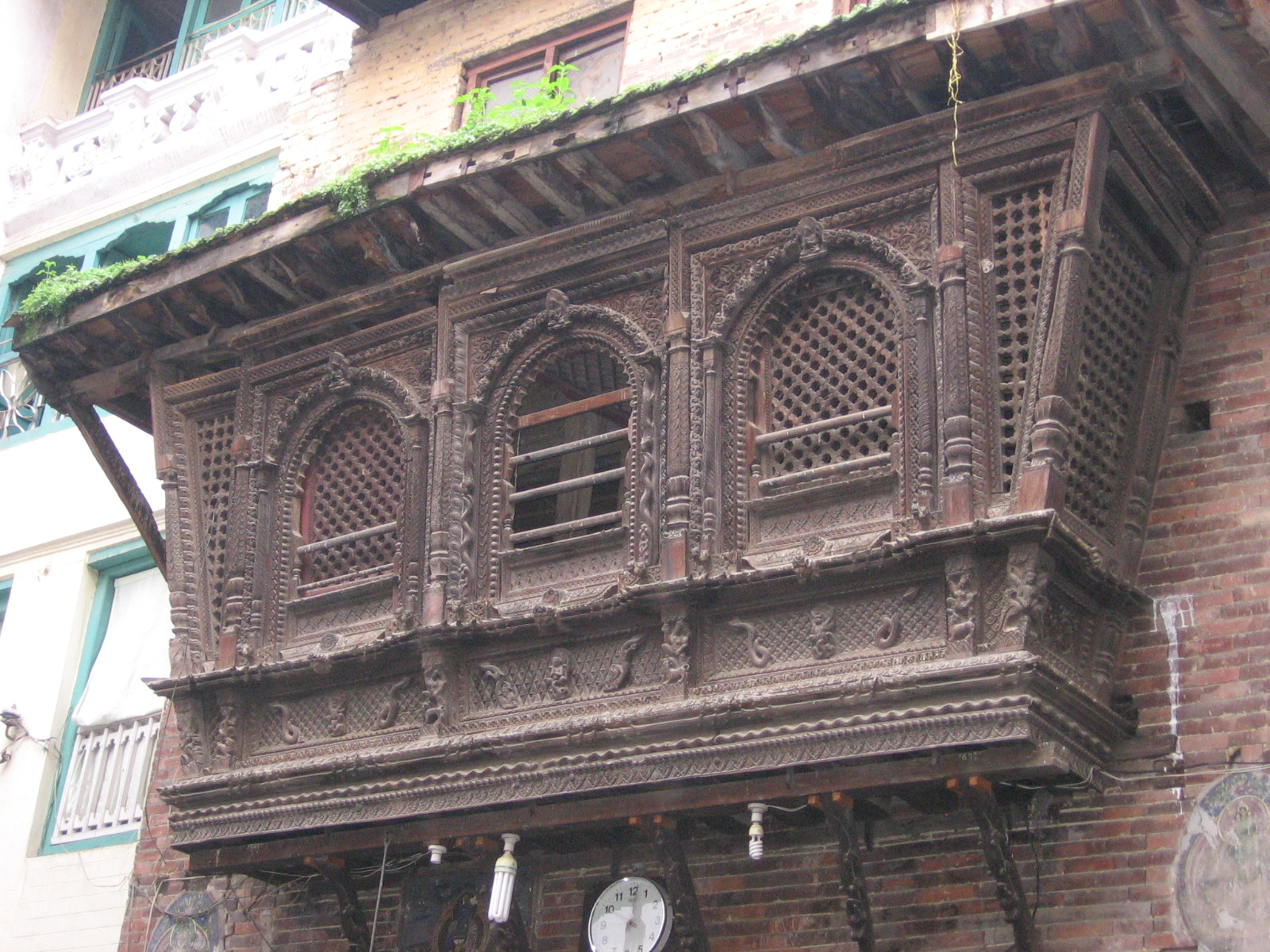
Gājhyā, Dhalasikwa Baha, Kathmandu

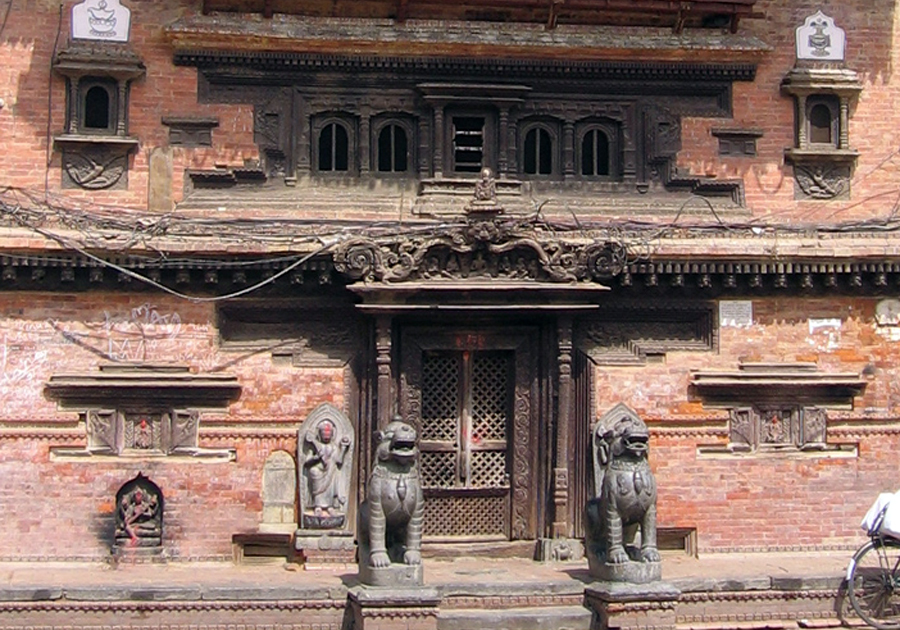
Pāsukhā Jhyā, Yatkha Baha, Kathmandu

== Famous windows ==
A number of traditional carved windows in the Kathmandu Valley are celebrated for their uniqueness.

- Desay Madu Jhya (देसय मदु झ्या:), set in a house in Kathmandu, means "the only window of its kind in the country".
- Lunjhyā (लुँझ्याः) at Patan Durbar, Patan is a gilded window. The name means "golden window".
- Mhaykhā Jhyā (म्हयखाझ्याः) at Bhaktapur means "peacock window" and depicts a fan tailed peacock.

== Gallery ==
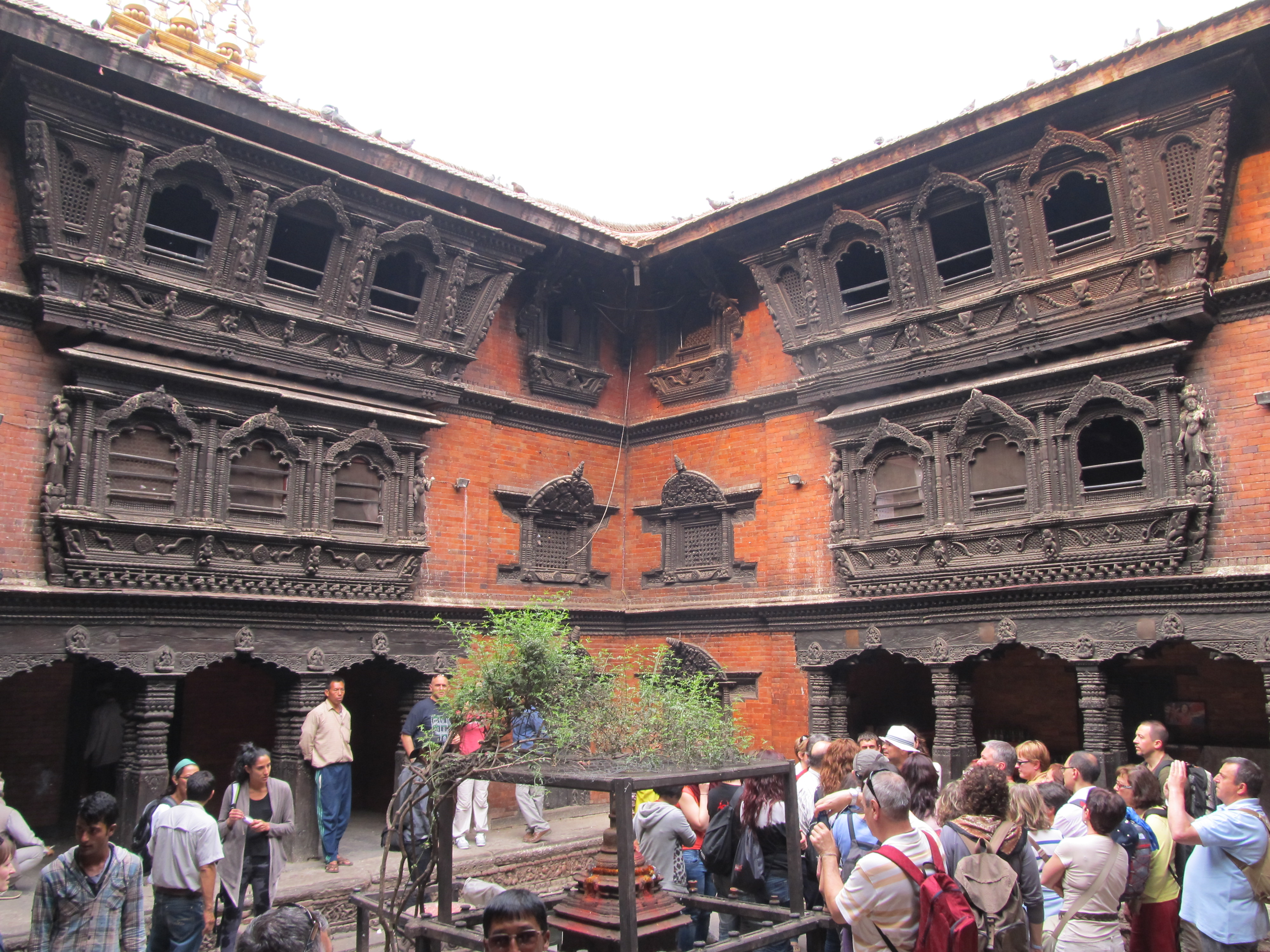
Courtyard of Kumari House, Kathmandu

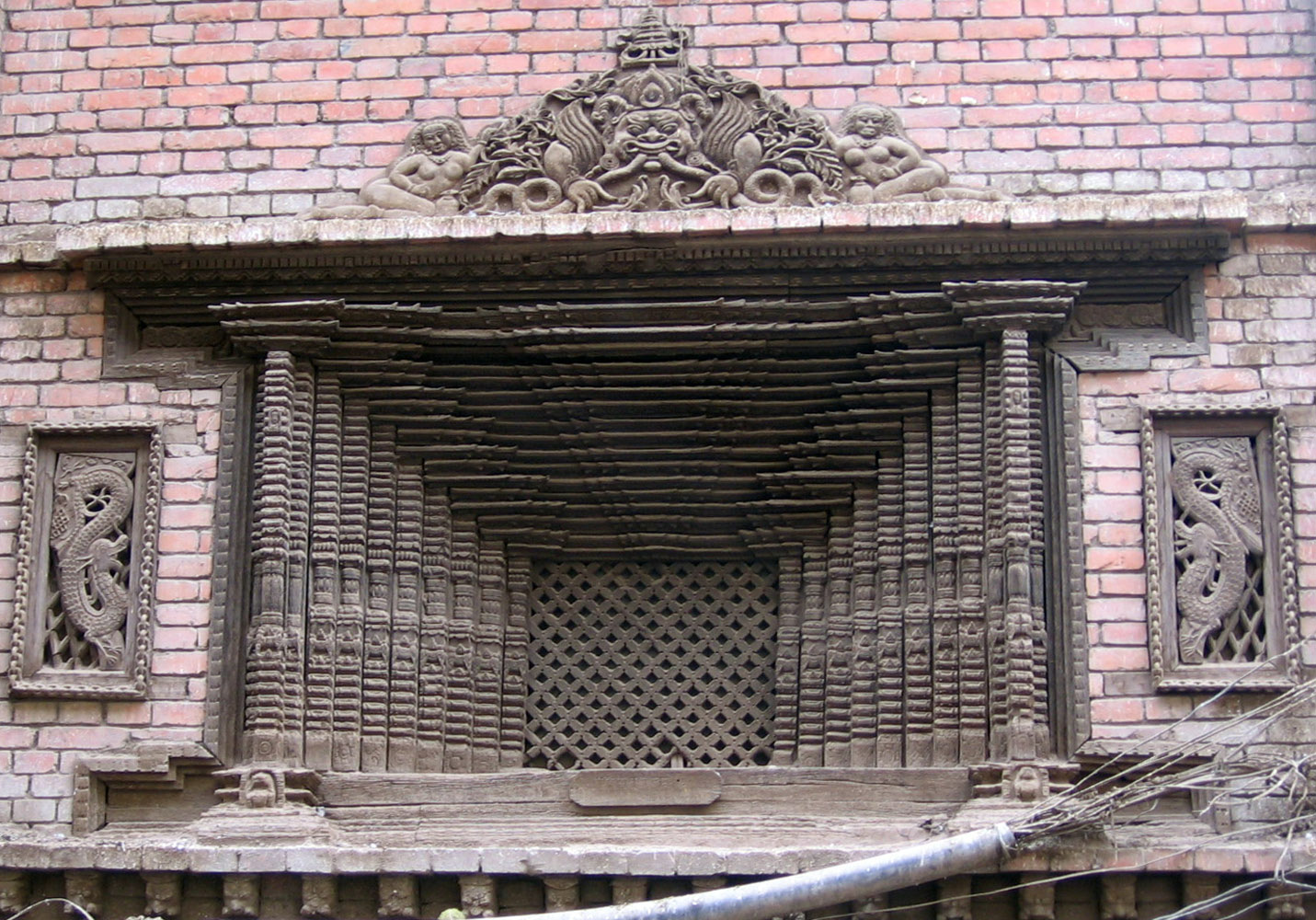
Desay Maru Jhyā, Kathmandu

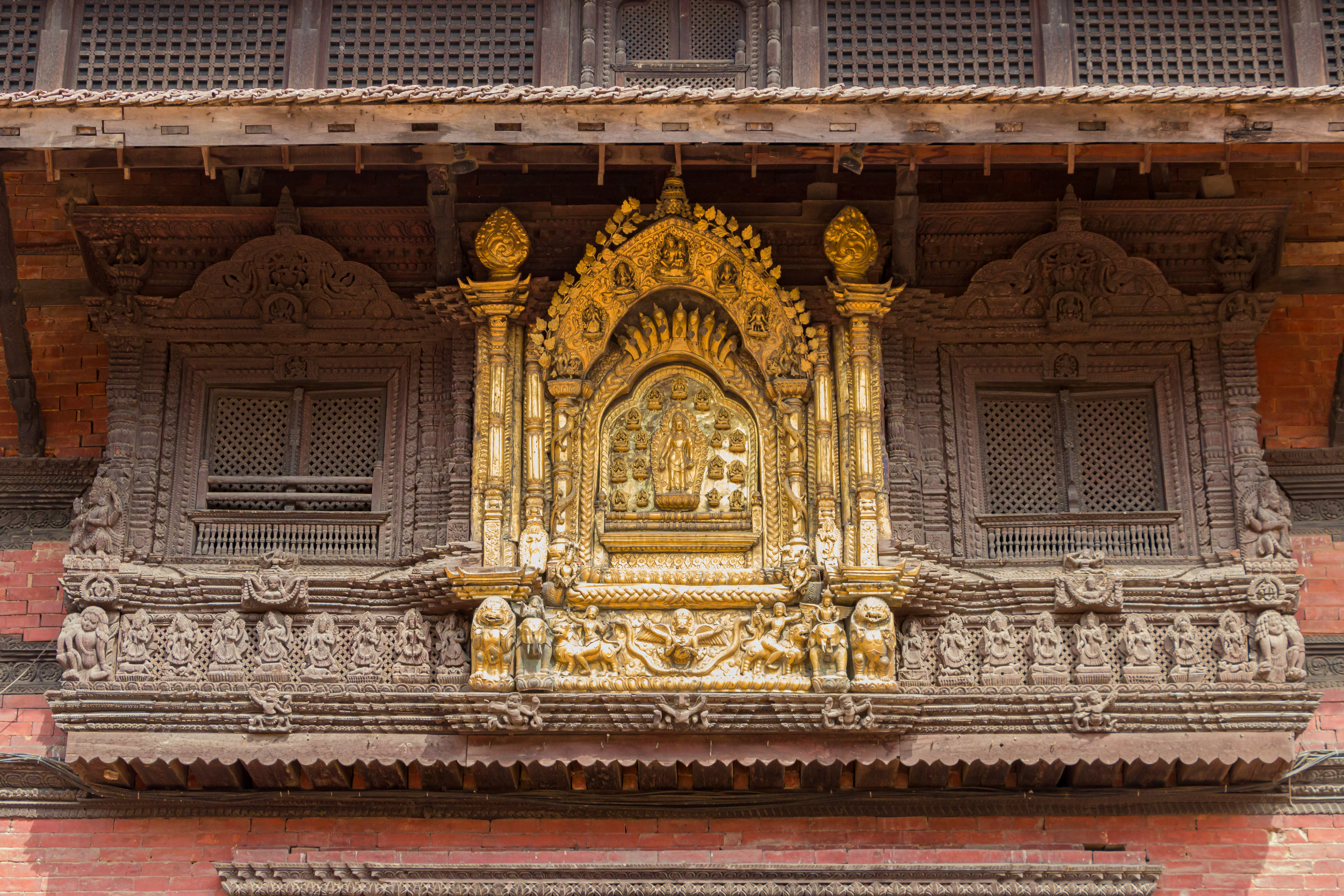
Golden Window, Patan Durbar Square

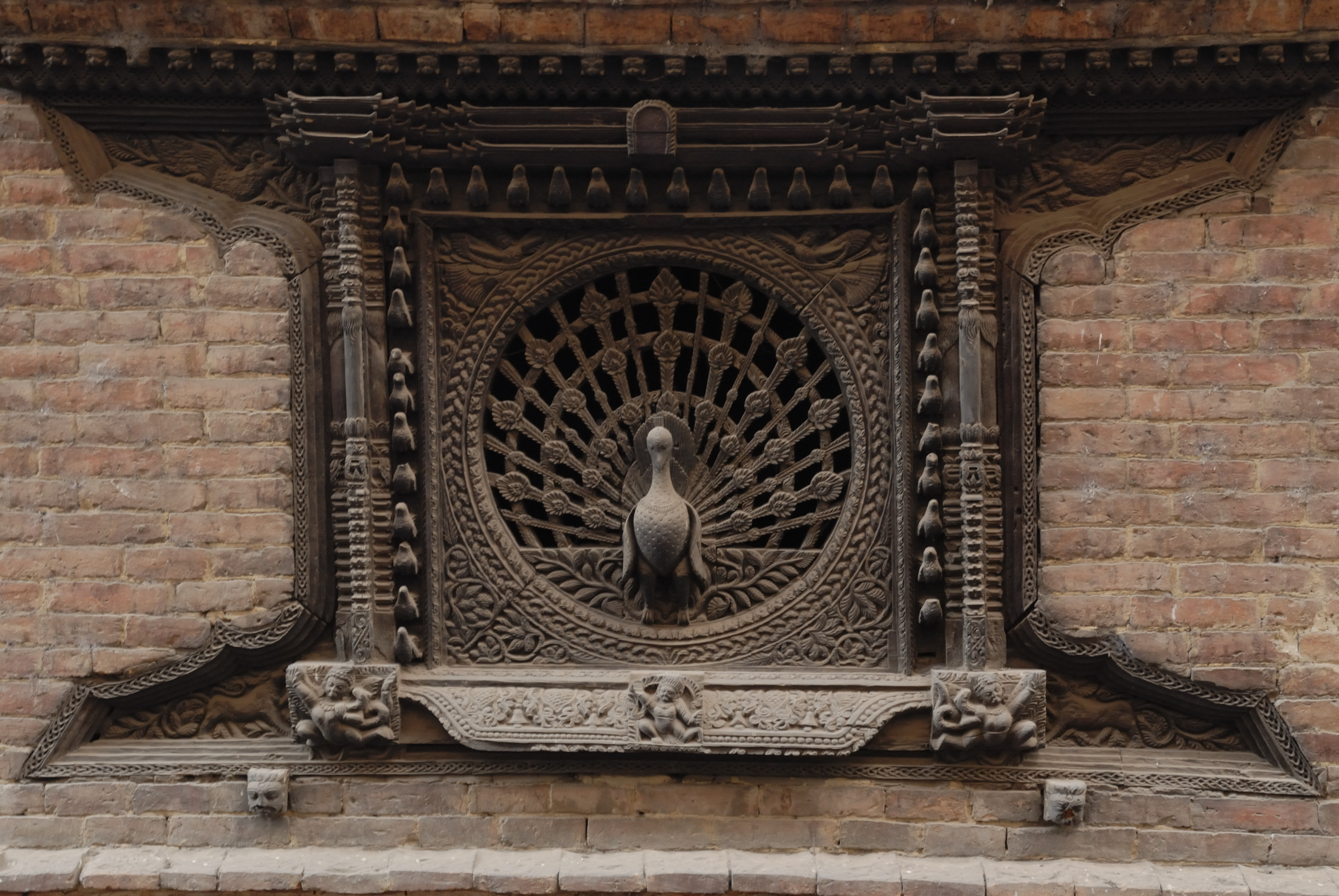
Peacock Window, Bhaktapur

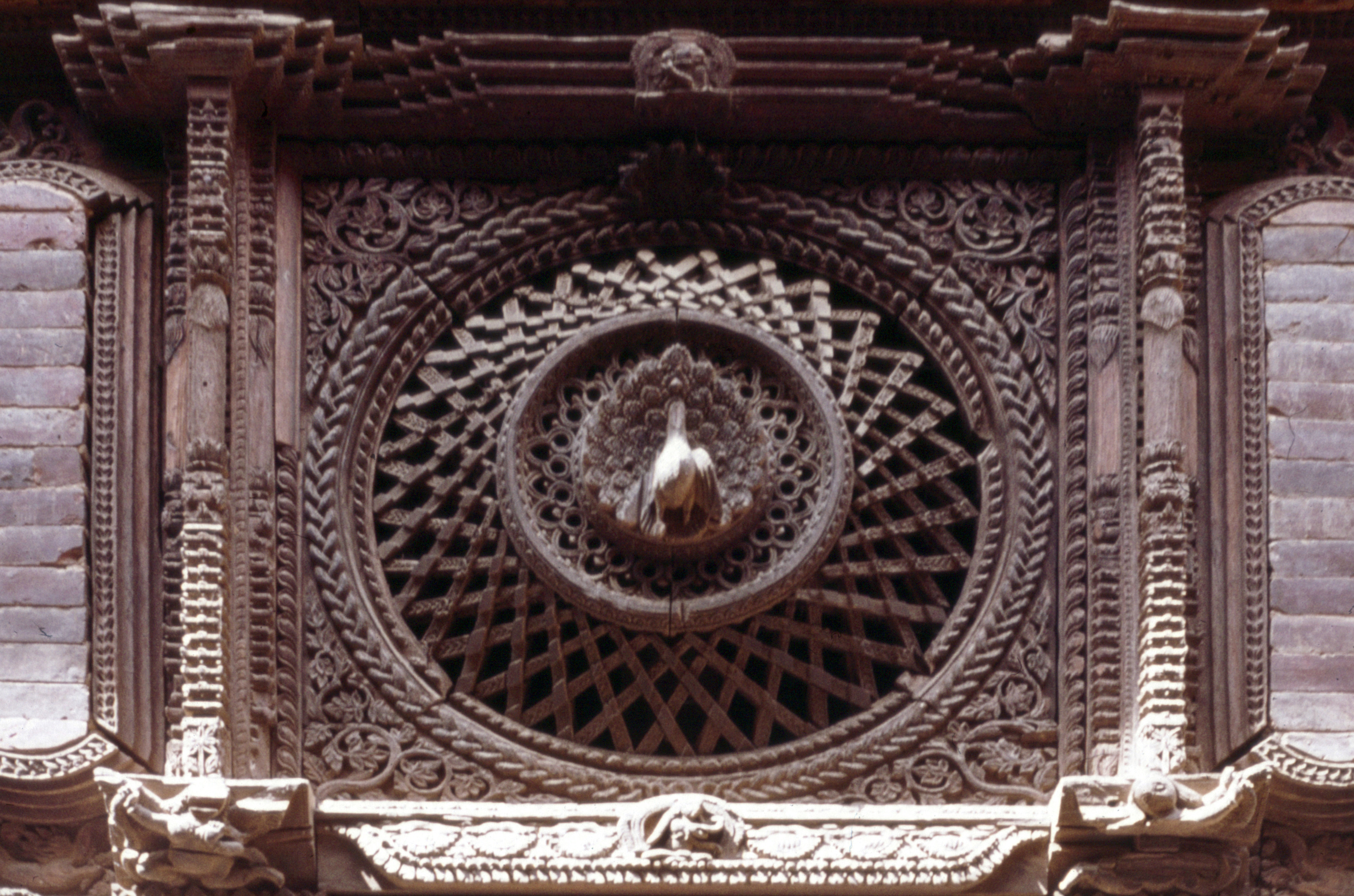
Another Peacock Window on the same building

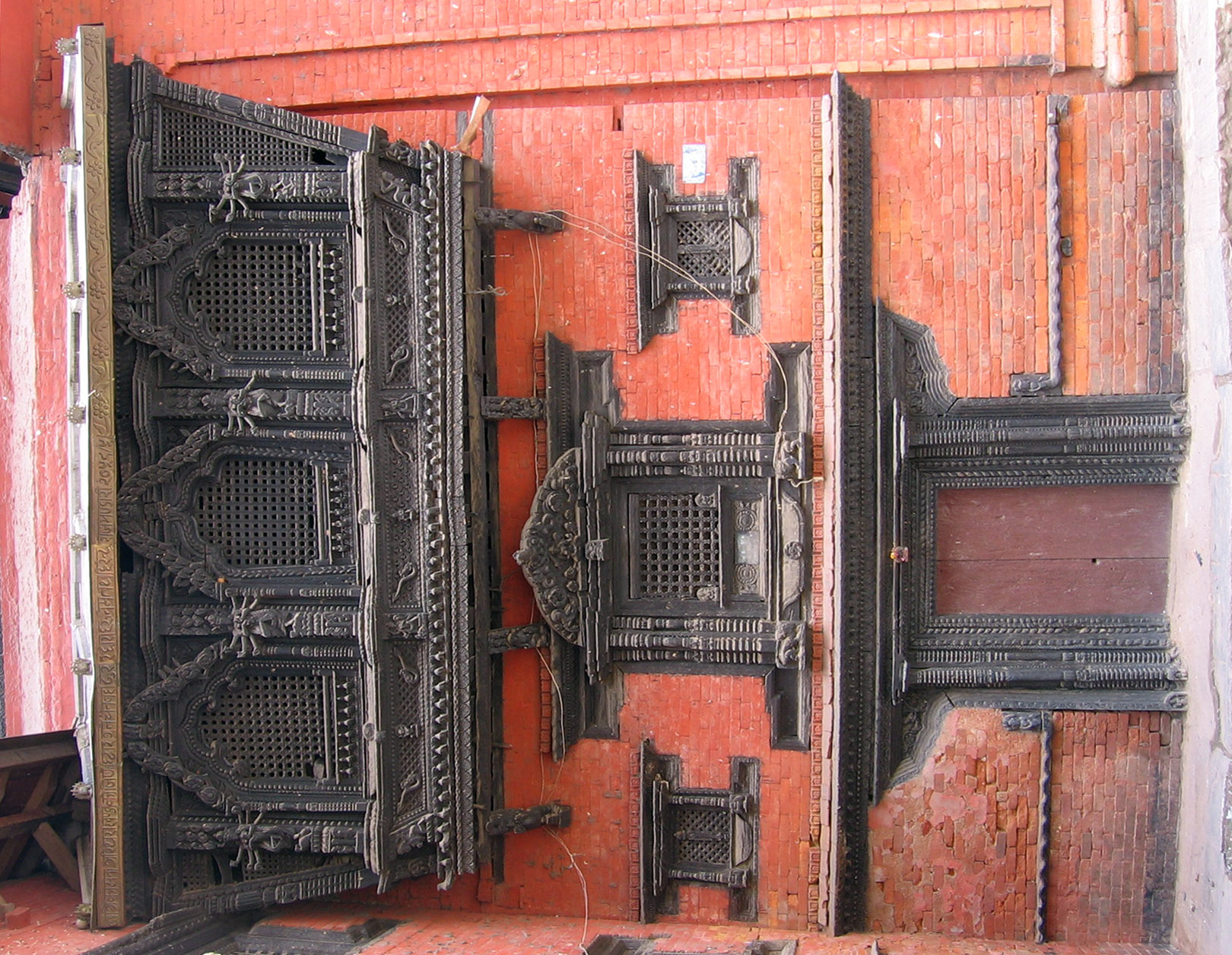
Sacred house, Kathmandu

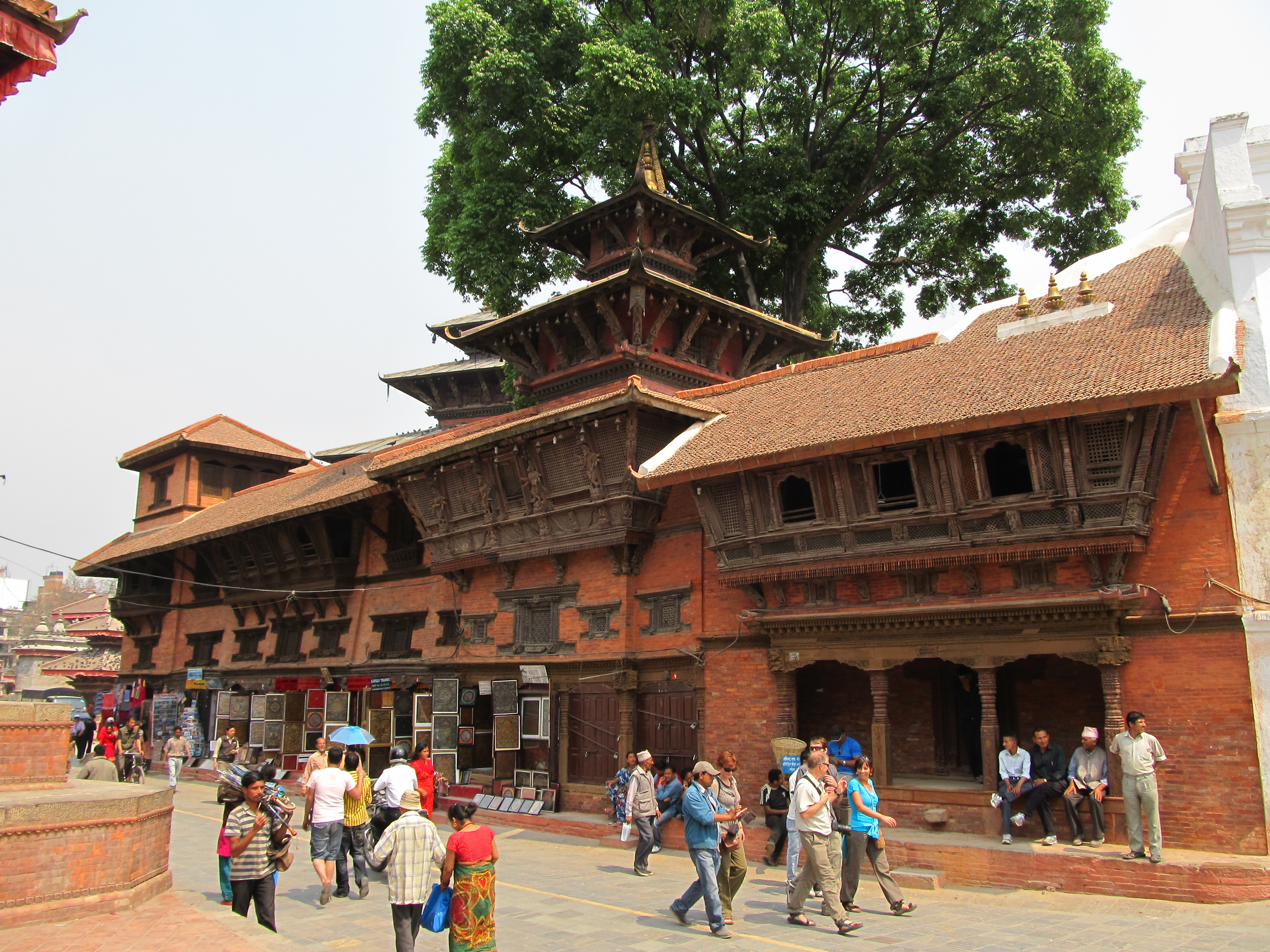
Kathmandu Durbar Square

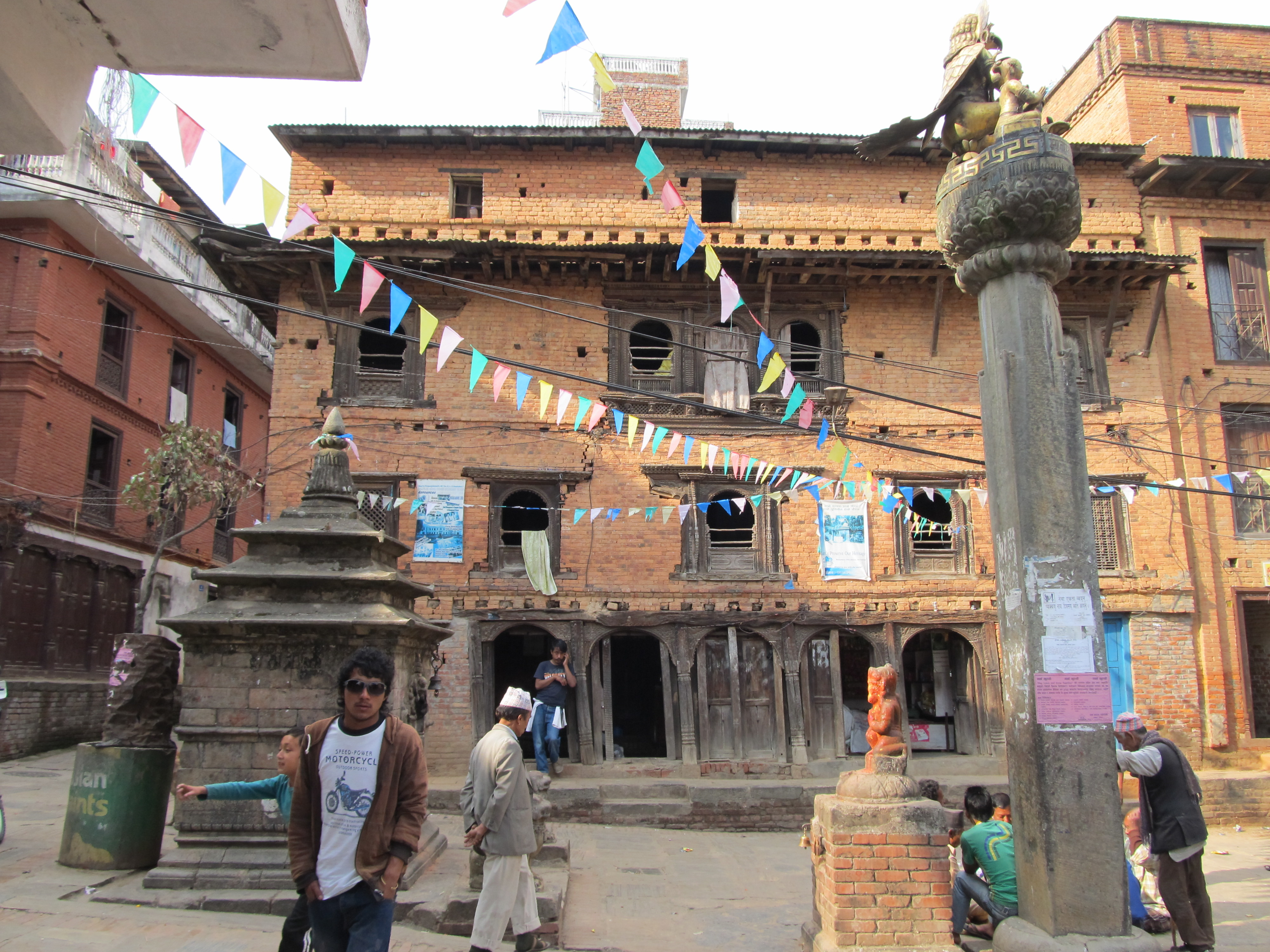
Temple square, Dhulikhel

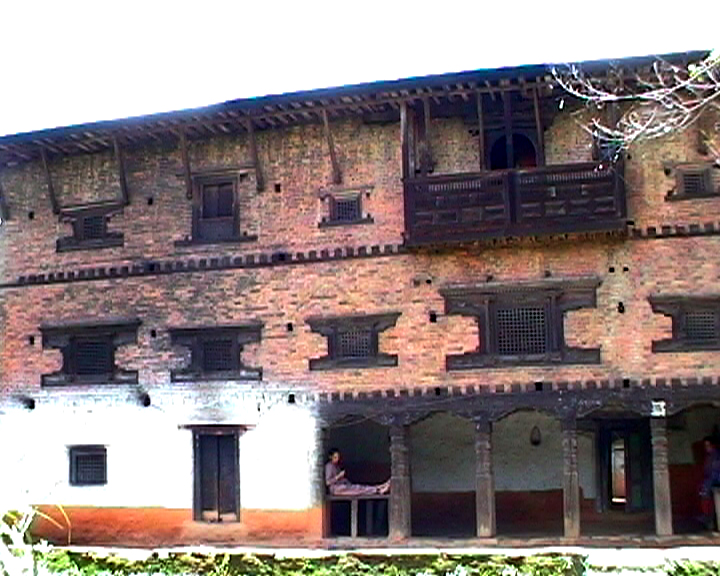
Ancient palace, Dolakha

== See also ==
- Newar architecture
