= Newar architecture =

Newari architectural style in Nepal

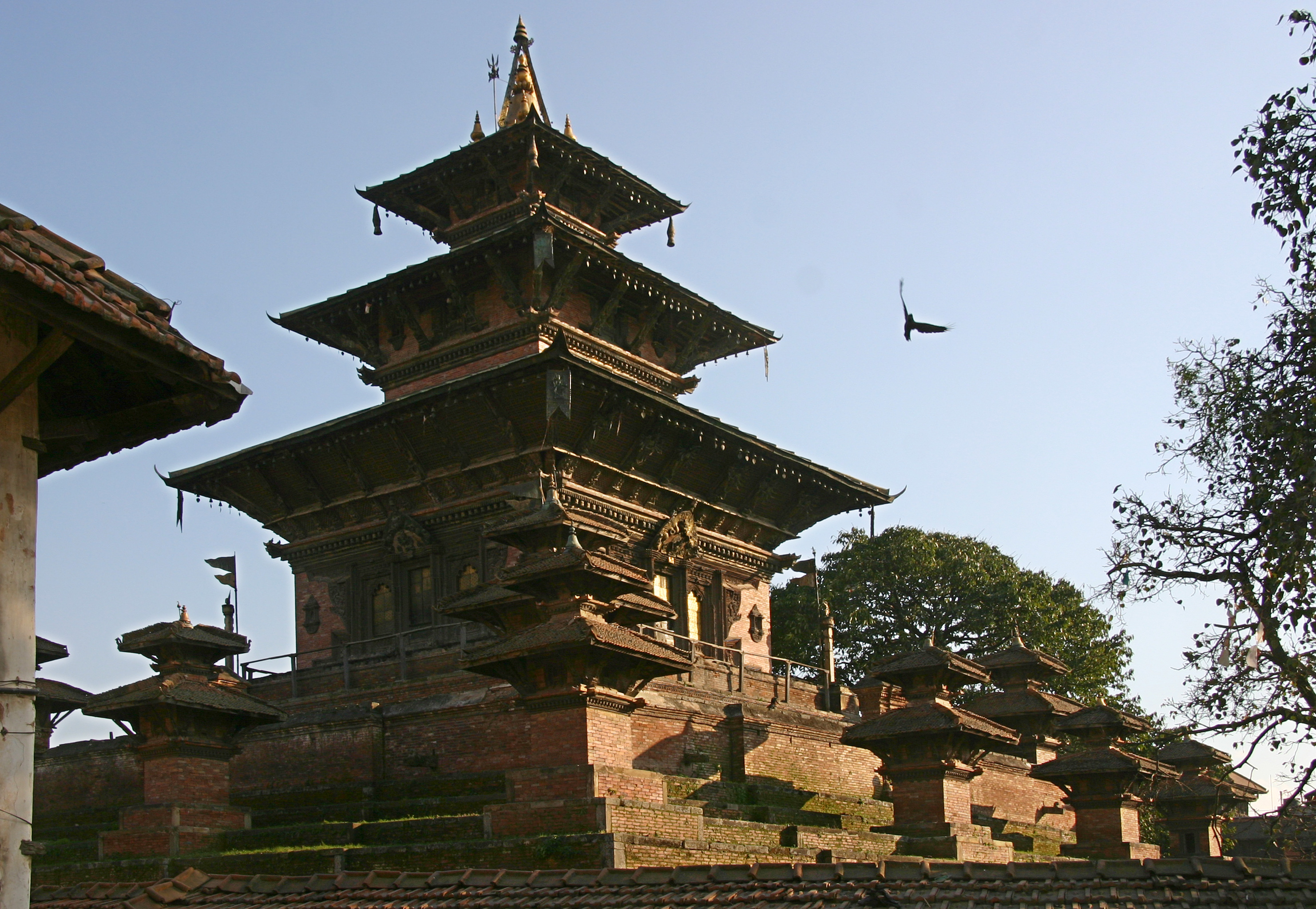
Taleju Temple, Kathmandu

Newar architecture or Newa architecture is an indigenous style of architecture used by the Newari people in the Kathmandu Valley in Nepal. Newar architecture consists of the pagoda, stupa, shikhara, chaitya and other styles. It is also known for its exquisite craftsmanship. Unique city planning and the harmonious integration of art, religion, and daily life. This architectural style is closely related to the cultural and historical development of Kathmandu Valley and has greatly influenced the architectural traditions of the region. The valley's trademark is the multiple-roofed Pagoda which may have originated in this area and spread to India, China, Indochina and Japan. Residential houses, monastic courtyards known as baha and bahi, rest houses, temples, stupas, priest houses and palaces are the various architectural structures found in the Kathmandu valley. Most of the chief monuments are located in the Durbar Squares of Kathmandu, Lalitpur and Bhaktapur, the old royal palace complexes built between the 12th and 18th centuries. The style is marked by striking brick work and a unique style of wood carving rarely seen outside Nepal. The style has been propagated by Nepalese architects including Arniko.

== History ==
The origins of Newari architecture can be traced back to the Licchavi period,Licchavis of Nepal, (400–750 AD), during which the Malla dynasty (Nepal) (12th–18th centuries) flourished. The Kathmandu Valley flourished in In terms of artistic architectural achievements, major cities such as Kathmandu, Patan and Bhaktapur became centers of Newari culture and craftsmanship.

Architectural traditions outside Nepal especially in Tibet and China It also influenced Newari architecture with its easy cultural and religious exchange. This is due to the valley's strategic location along the ancient trade route.

== Key features ==
- Pagoda-style temple

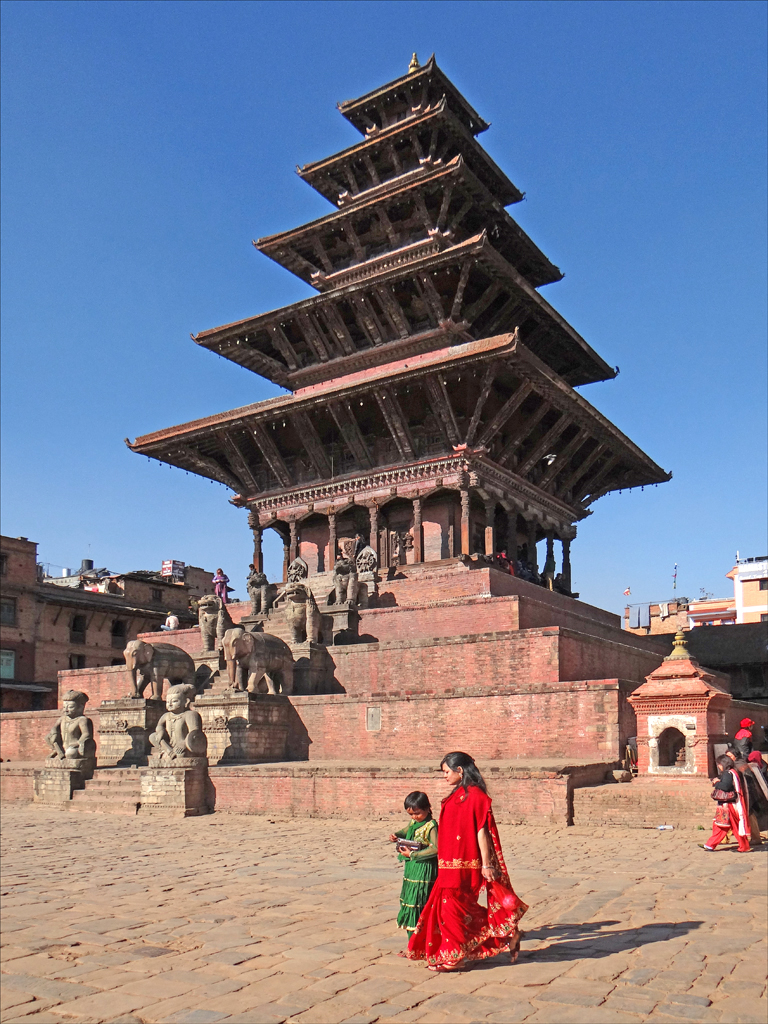
Nyatapola Temple, Bhaktapur, Nepal

Newari temples are usually built in the form of a pagoda. It has a tiered roof. Supported by wooden panels these pillars are generally decorated with carvings of gods, mythical creatures, and icons. A good example is the Nyatapola Temple built in 1702 in Bhaktapur. It is an example of the style's balance and precision.

- Residential and courtyard architecture

Traditional Newari houses are designed around Common courtyards known as bahals or bahis courtyards serve as community spaces for social, cultural, and religious activities. Houses are generally built with locally available materials, such as bricks, mud and mortar, and intricately carved wooden crypts.

- Brick and Timber Construction

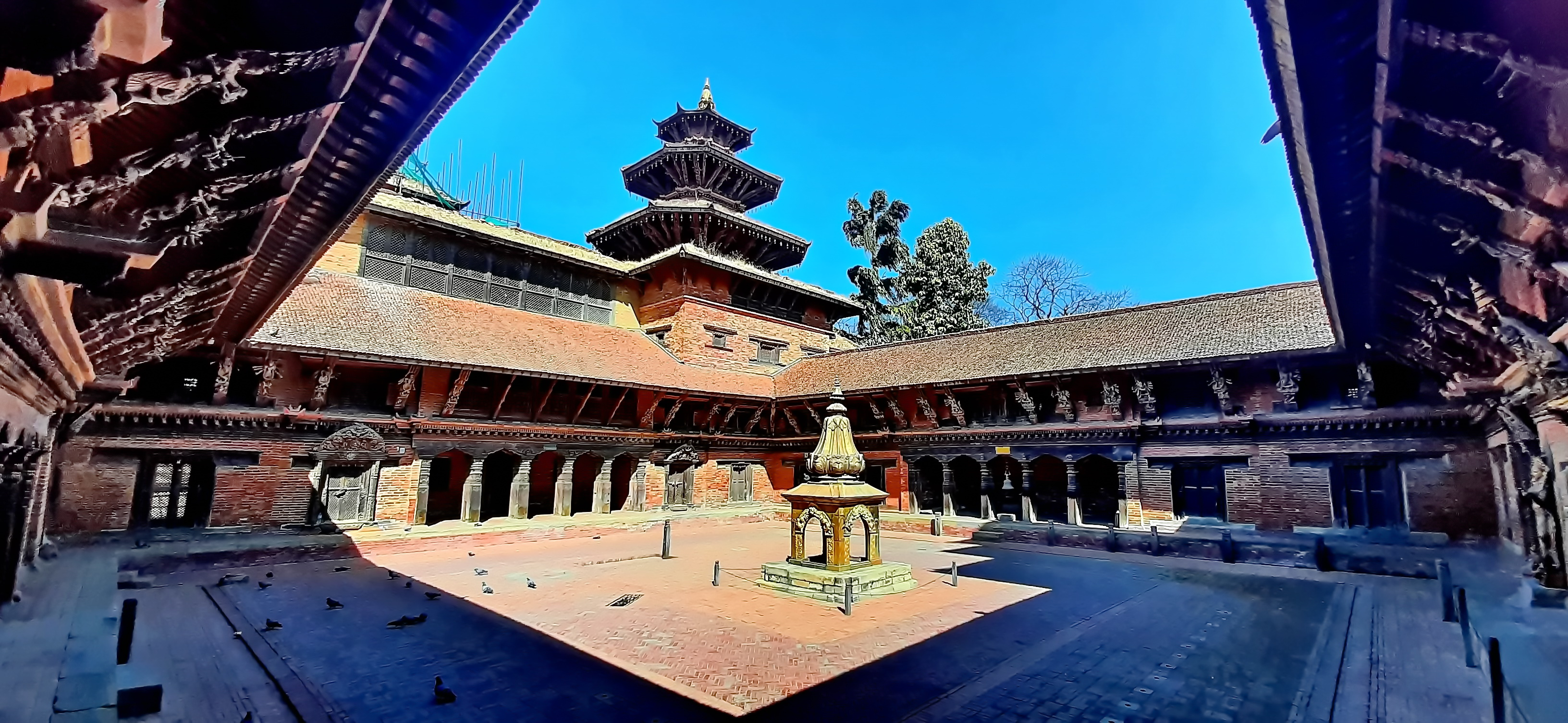
Mool Chowk (Main courtyard ) Patan Durbar Square

The use of red bricks and finely carved wooden elements is a defining feature of Newari architecture. Tundals (wooden brackets) and ankhijhyal (latticed windows) are distinctive decorative and functional elements. The craftsmanship of these elements reflects the high level of skill among Newar artisans. Floors are supported by closely spaced joists (dhalin) with a layer of terra cotta tiles or wooden planks. This subfloor is topped with a 10cm thick cover of fine yellow clay. The joists rest on continuous wooden wall plates that are embedded in the masonry.

- Stupas and Chaityas

Swayambhunath Stupa

Newari architecture includes Buddhist stupas and chaityas, which are small, often dome-shaped structures used for religious purposes. Iconic stupas such as the Swayambhunath and Boudha Stupaare prominent examples, showcasing a blend of religious symbolism and architectural innovation.

== Symbolism and Design ==
Newari architecture incorporates spiritual and cosmic symbolism, often attaching to the principles of the mandala, a geometric design representing the universe. The alignment and spatial arrangement of structures reflect traditional cosmological beliefs and are intended to harmonize human habitation with the divine.

== Conservation and Challenges ==
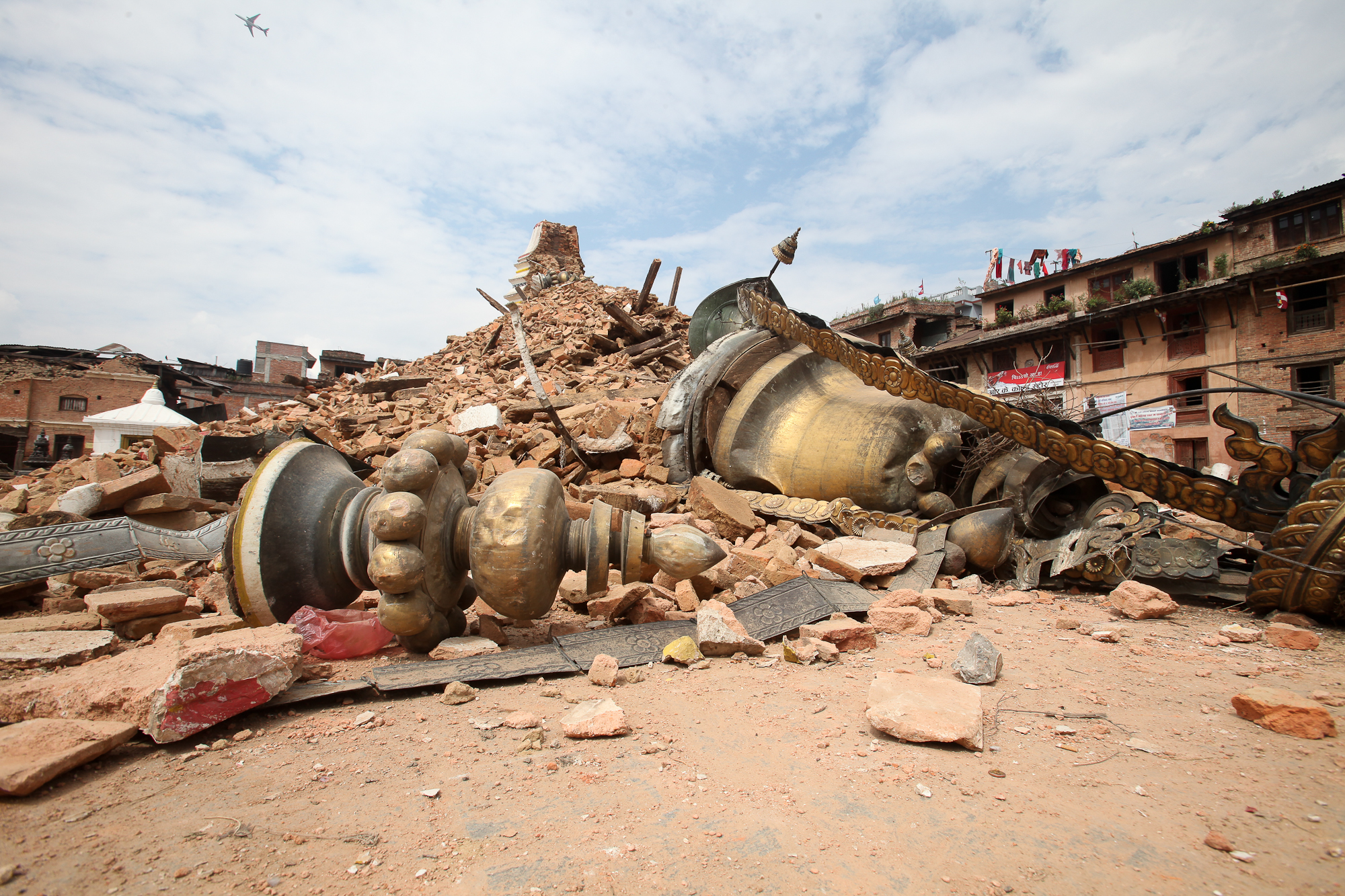
Machindrra Nath Temple, Bungamati

Newari architecture has faced challenges in recent decades due to rapid urbanization, modernization, and natural disasters, including the 2015 Gorkha earthquake,April 2015 Nepal earthquake, which damaged many historical structures. Restoration and conservation efforts have been undertaken by organizations such as UNESCO and local communities to preserve this architectural heritage.

== Legacy and Influence ==
Newari architecture continues to influence modern architectural practices in Nepal and beyond. Contemporary architects often incorporate traditional motifs and techniques into new constructions, blending historical aesthetics with modern functionality.

== Pagoda temples ==
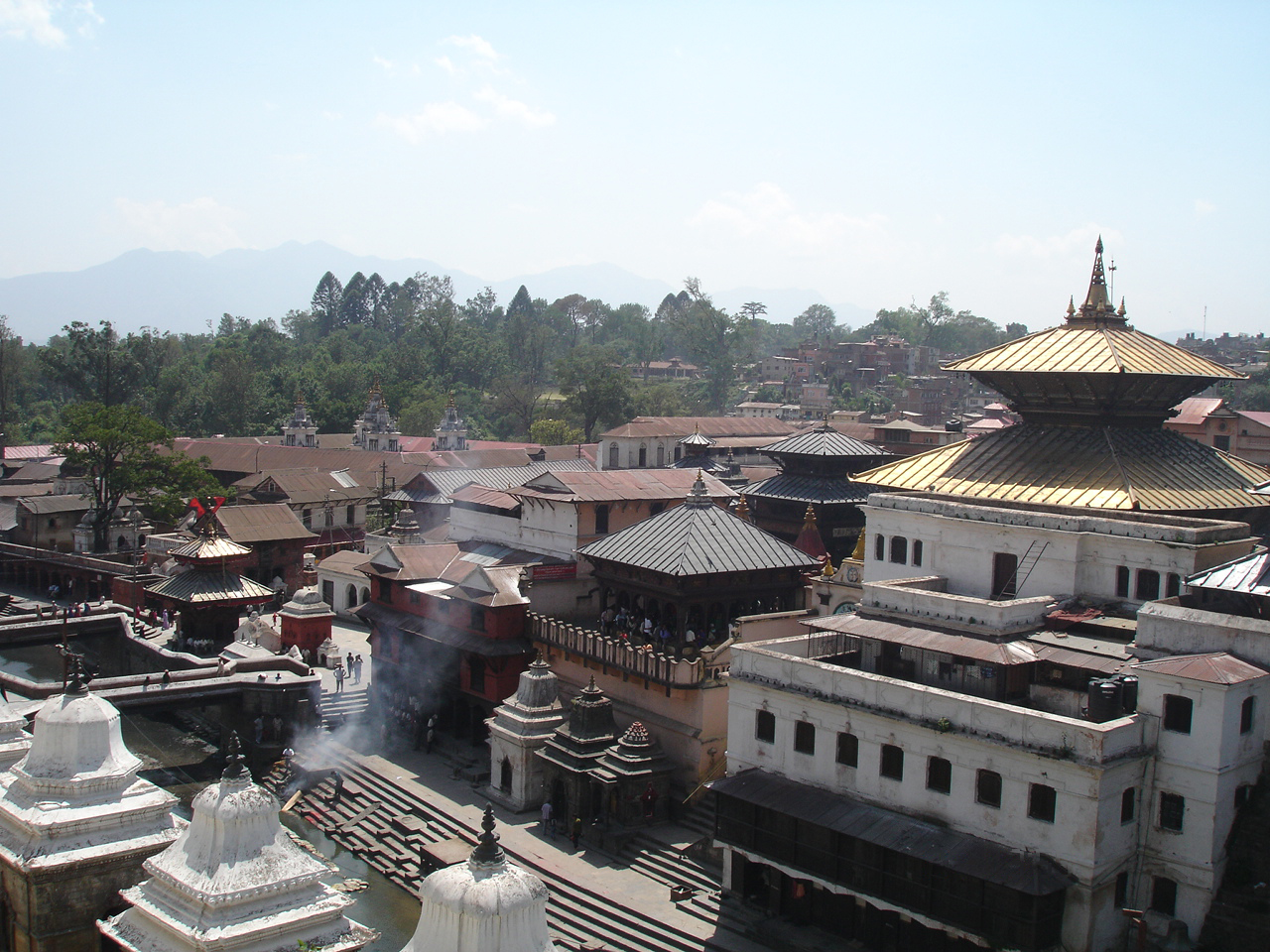
The temple of Pashupatinath

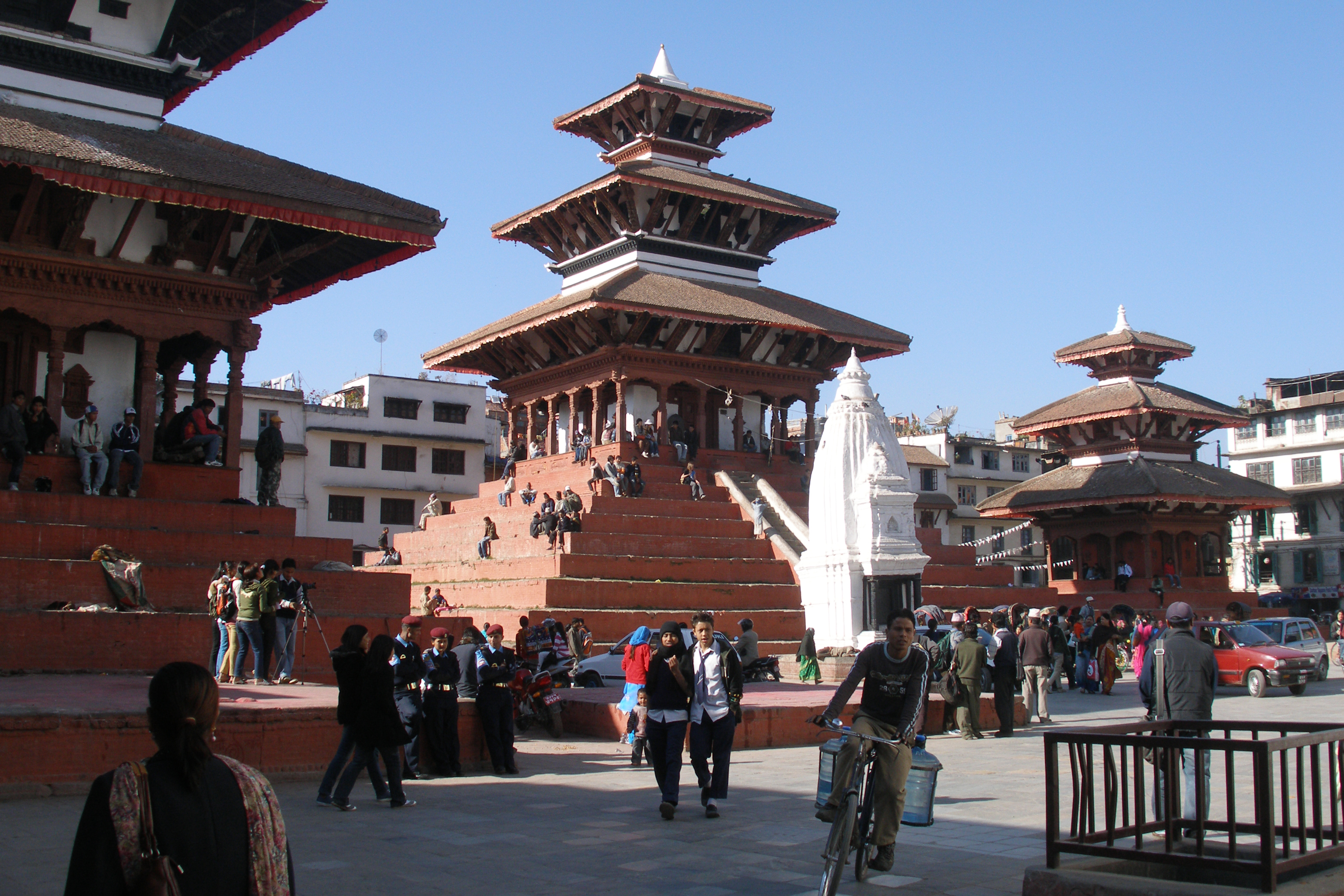
Kathmandu Durbar Square

A few of the most prominent Newari-style pagodas include:

- Chandeshwori Temple
- Changu Narayan Temple
- Kasthamandap Sattal
- Kathmandu Durbar Square - The nine storied Palace
- Kumbheshwar Temple
- Muktinath Temple
- Naradevi Temple
- Narayanhity Royal Palace
- Nhugha Dega Temple
- Nyatapola Temple
- Pashupatinath Temple
- Taleju Bhawani temple

== See also ==
- Bahal
- Newar window
- Architecture of Nepal
- Malla dynasty (Nepal)
- Kathmandu Valley
