= Desay Madu Jhya =

Traditional wooden window in Nepal

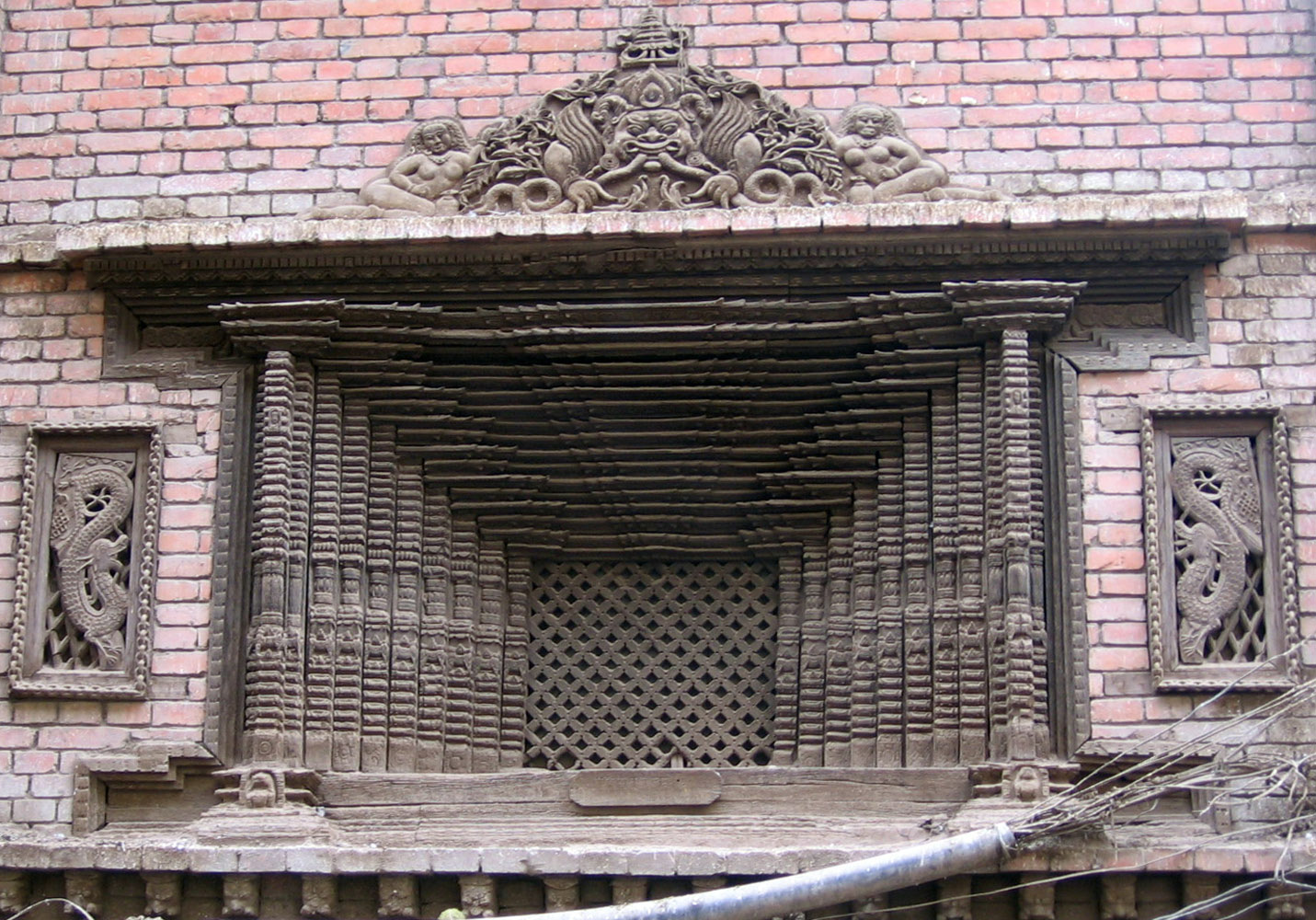
Desay Maru Jhya, the only window of its kind in the country.

Desay Maru Jhyā (Nepali: देशय् मरू झ्या) is a traditional wooden window in Kathmandu, which is celebrated for its uniqueness. The name means "window without equal in the country" in Nepal Bhasa. The window is set into the facade of a residential house in central Kathmandu.

Desay Maru Jhyā is a specimen of the woodcarving heritage of the Newar people of Nepal which goes back more than a thousand years. Newar architecture is characterised by artistic windows and doors set into bare brick walls. The intricate carvings mostly depict religious motifs, ritual objects, mythical beasts and birds. The level of design and carving of the Newar window reached its peak in the mid-18th century. They are found on palaces, private residences and sacred houses across Nepal Mandala.

Desay Maru Jhyā is famed for being the only one of its kind. While most traditional windows are bay windows carved with elaborate details, Desay Maru Jhya is a latticed window with multiple frames. Its design looks like the bellows in an old folding camera.

The unique window is set into a house at Naradevi, a street to the north of Kathmandu Durbar Square, the old royal palace complex. The street forms part of the ceremonial circuit in the historic section of Kathmandu through which chariot processions and festival parades pass. The window is a tourist attraction and is part of the itinerary on sightseeing tours of the city.

== National treasure ==
Desay Maru Jhyā is more than a century old and has been declared a national treasure. In 1978, the Postal Service Department of the Nepal government issued a postage stamp depicting the window.
