= Kathmandu Durbar Square =

Square in Kathmandu, Nepal

- Ye Lāyekū (Newar)
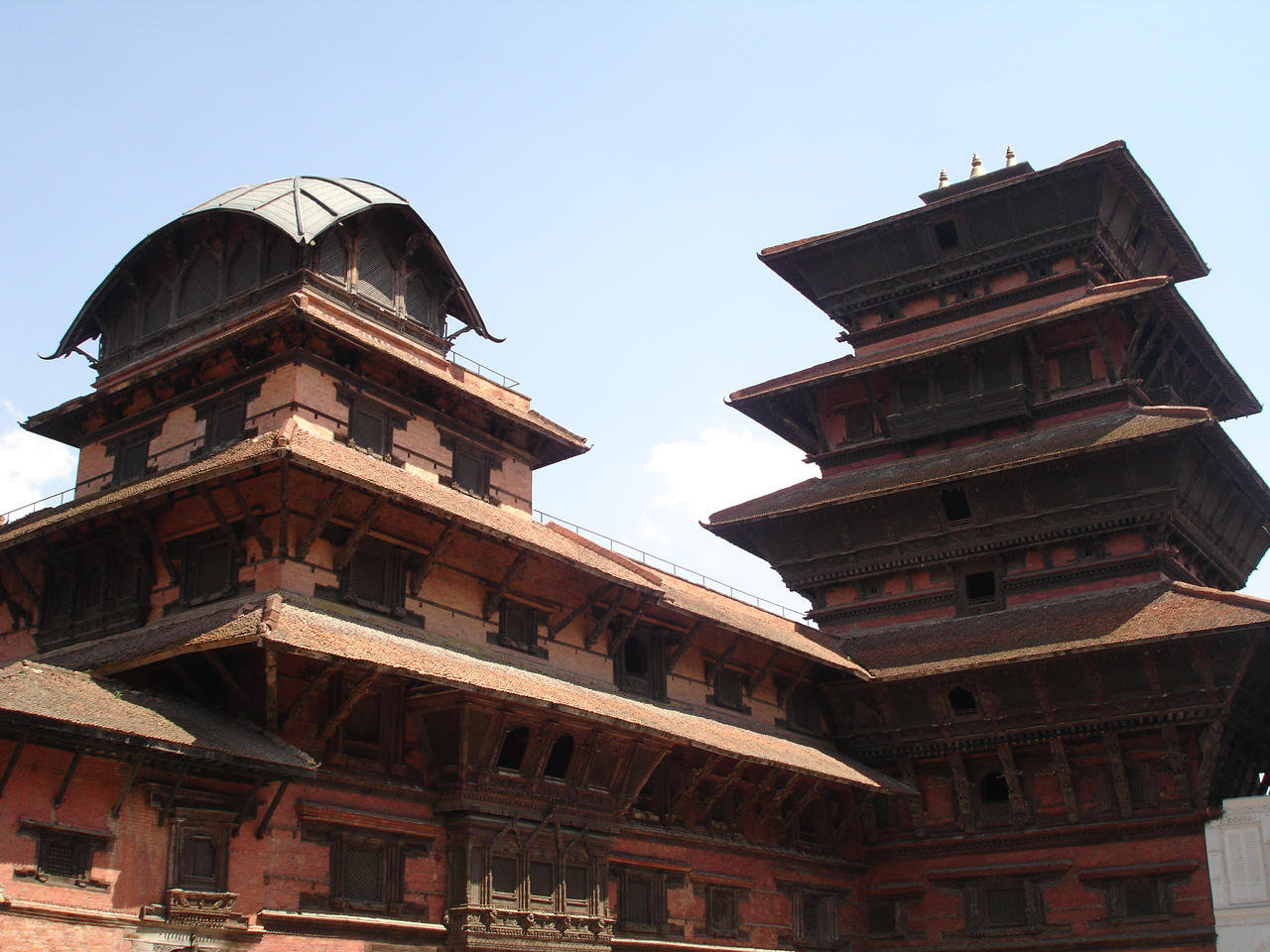
- Kathmandu Durbar Square

- Location within Nepal
- Interactive map of Kathmandu Durbar Square
- 27°42′15″N 85°18′23″E
- Location: Kathmandu, Nepal

History
- Built: 4th to 8th century
- Original use: Royal Palace

Site notes
- Area: 167.37 ha (413.6 acres)
- Architectural style: Newar architecture
- Website: hanumandhoka.gov.np

UNESCO World Heritage Site
- Type: Cultural
- Criteria: iii, iv, vi
- Designated: 1979
- Part of: Kathmandu Valley
- Reference no.: 121
- Region: Asia
- Session: 3rd

Protected Monument Zone
- Law: Ancient Monuments Preservation Act, 2013 (1956)

Kathmandu Durbar Square (Nepal Bhasa: येँ लायकु/𑐥𑐾𑑄 𑐮𑐵𑐫𑐎𑐹, Nepali: हनुमानढोका दरबार; Basantapur Durbar Kshetra) is a historically and culturally significant site in Kathmandu, Nepal. It is one of the three Durbar (royal palace) Squares in the Kathmandu Valley in Nepal that are UNESCO World Heritage Sites.

Although the construction of the square began in the 3rd century, the major structures within it were added in later periods. The outer complex consists of a number of 16th-century temples built during the reign of the Malla kings. These buildings are adorned with meticulously carved facades characteristic of Newar architecture. The central square is surrounded by palace complexes built during the Malla and Shah periods. The best known is the Nautalle Durbar, a nine-story palace built by Prithvi Narayan Shah to commemorate the Unification of Nepal.

== Important Buildings ==
=== Hanuman Dhoka Palace Complex ===
Royal residence with multiple courtyards like Nasal Chowk and Mul Chowk.

=== Kumari Bahal/ Ghar ===
A three-story temple called Kumari Chowk or Kumari Bahal is located at the southern edge of the Durbar square. This Malla-era temple is used as the residence of the Kumari, a young girl worshiped as a living embodiment of the Hindu deity Durga.

== Earthquake damage ==
On 25 April 2015, an earthquake with an estimated magnitude of 7.9 (M_{w}) hit the region and severely damaged the Square, reducing several buildings to rubble, the most prominent of which was the centuries-old wooden structure, Kasthamandap.

== See also ==
- Bhaktapur Durbar Square
- Durbar Square
- Patan Durbar Square
