= Newar people =

Native ethnic group of Nepal

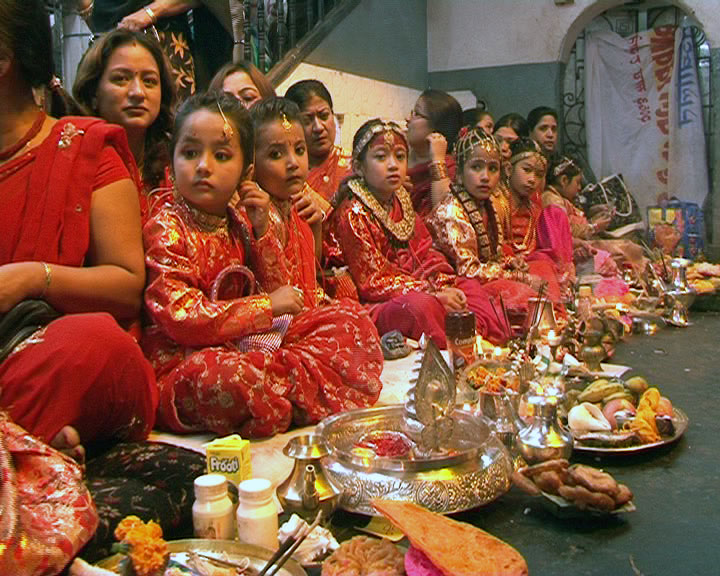
- Newar children in traditional costumes during Ihi

Total population
- 1,507,363

Regions with significant populations
- Nepal: 1,341,363 (2021 census)
- India: 166,000 (2006)

Languages
- Nepal Bhasa (Newar); Nepali

Religion
- Majority Newar Hinduism (89.1%) Minority Newar Buddhism (9.0%) Christianity (1.9%); • Islam

Related ethnic groups
- Indo-Aryan people, other Tibeto-Burman speakers

Newar (/nɪˈwɑːr/; Newar: 𑐣𑐾𑐰𑐵𑐬, Devanagari: नेवार, endonym: Newa; Newar: 𑐣𑐾𑐰𑐵𑑅, Devanagari: नेवाः), or Nepami, are primarily inhabitants in Kathmandu Valley of Nepal and its surrounding areas, and the creators of its historic heritage and civilisation. Newars are a distinct linguistic and cultural group, primarily Indo-Aryan and Tibeto-Burman ethnicities, who share a common language, Nepal Bhasa, and predominantly practice Newar Hinduism and Newar Buddhism. Newars have developed a division of labour and a sophisticated urban civilisation not seen elsewhere in the Himalayan foothills. Newars have continued their age-old traditions and practices and pride themselves on being the true custodians of the religion, culture and civilisation of Nepal. Newars are known for their contributions to culture, art and literature, trade, agriculture and cuisine. Today, they consistently rank as the most economically and socially advanced community in Nepal, according to the annual Human Development Index published by UNDP. Newars are ranked as the 8th largest ethnic group in Nepal according to the 2021 Nepal census numbering 1,341,363 people constituting 4.6% of the total population.

The Kathmandu Valley and surrounding territories constituted the former Newar kingdom of the Nepal Mandala. Unlike other common-origin ethnic or caste groups in Nepal, the Newars are regarded as an example of a nation community with a relict identity, derived from an ethnically diverse, previously existing polity. The Newar community within it consists of various strands of ethnic, racial, caste and religious heterogeneity, as they are the descendants of the diverse group of people that have lived in Nepal Mandala since prehistoric times. Indo-Aryan tribes like Maithils of Madhesh Province, the Licchavis, Kosala, and Mallas (N) from respective Indian Mahajanapada (i.e. Licchavis of Vajji, Kosala, and Malla (I)) that arrived at different periods eventually merged with the local native population by marriage as well as adopting their language and customs. These tribes however retained their Vedic culture and brought with them their Sanskritic languages, social structure, Hindu religion and culture, which were assimilated with local cultures and gave rise to the current Newar civilisation. Newar rule in Nepal Mandala ended with its conquest by the Gorkha Kingdom in 1768.

== Origin and etymology ==
The terms "Nepāl", "Newār", "Newāl" and "Nepār" are phonetically different forms of the same word, and instances of the various forms appear in texts in different times in history. Nepal is the literary (Sanskrit) form and Newar is the colloquial (Prakrit) form. A Sanskrit inscription dated to 512 in Tistung, a valley to the west of Kathmandu, contains the phrase "greetings to the Nepals" indicating that the term "Nepal" was used to refer to both the country and the people.

The term "Newar" or "Newa:" referring to "inhabitant of Nepal" appeared for the first time in an inscription dated 1654 in Kathmandu. Italian Jesuit priest Ippolito Desideri (1684–1733) who traveled to Nepal in 1721 has written that the natives of Nepal are called Newars. It has been suggested that "Nepal" may be a sanskritization of "Newar", or "Newar" may be a later form of "Nepal". According to another explanation, the words "Newar" and "Newari" are colloquial forms arising from the mutation of P to W, and L to R. As a result of the phonological process of dropping the last consonant and lengthening the vowel, "Newā" for Newār or Newāl, and "Nepā" for Nepāl are used in ordinary speech. Newars are the indigenous inhabitants of Kathmandu Valley.

== History ==
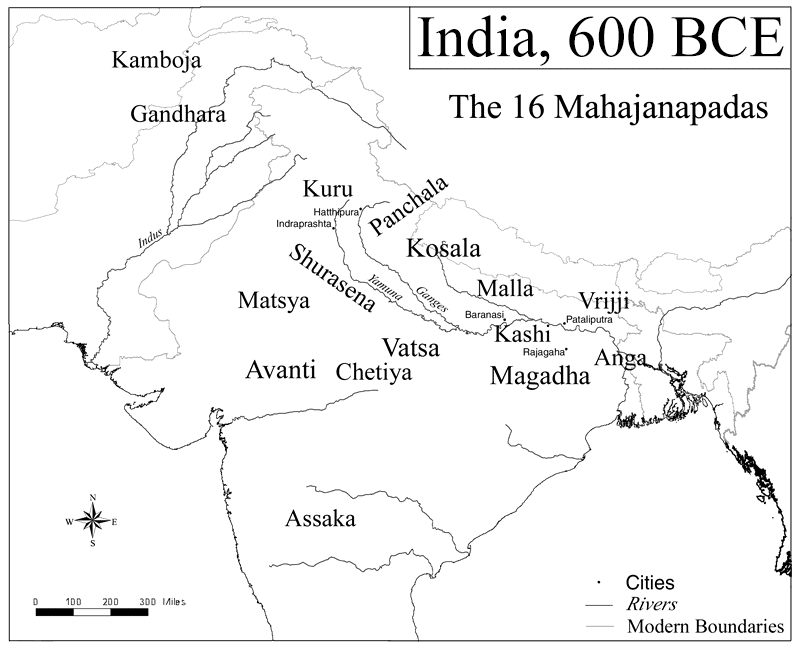
The Vajji or Vṛji Mahajanapada and Malla Mahajanapada in 600 BCE; The notable Licchavi (kingdom) and Malla (Nepal) of Nepal Mandala originated from their respective regions.

For over two millennia, the Newa civilization in Central Nepal preserved a microcosm of classical North Indian culture in which Brahmanic and Buddhist elements enjoyed equal status. Snellgrove and Richardson (1968) speak of 'the direct heritage of pre-Islamic India'. The Malla dynasty was noted for their patronisation of the Maithili language (the language of the Mithila region) which was afforded equal status to that of Sanskrit in the Malla court. Maithil Brahmin priests were invited to Kathmandu and many Maithil families settled in Kathmandu during Malla rule. The influx of people from both the north (Tibet) and south (Tirhut) increased not only Nepal's genetic and racial diversity but also greatly moulded the dominant culture and tradition of the Newars.

The divisions of the Newars had different historical developments. The common identity of the Newar was formed in the Kathmandu Valley. Until the conquest of the valley by the Gorkha Kingdom in 1769, all the people who had inhabited the valley at any point in time were either Newar or progenitors of Newar. So, the history of Newar correlates to the history of the Kathmandu Valley (or Nepala Mandala) prior to the establishment of the modern state of Nepal.

The earliest known history of Newar and the Kathmandu Valley blends with mythology recorded in historical chronicles. One such text, which recounts the creation of the valley, is the Swayambhu Purana. According to this Buddhist scripture, the Kathmandu Valley was a giant lake until the Bodhisattva Manjusri, with the aid of a holy sword, cut a gap in the surrounding hills and let the water out. This legend is supported by geological evidence of an ancient lakebed, and it provides an explanation for the high fertility of the Kathmandu Valley soil.

According to the "Swayambhu inscription", Manjusri then established a city called Manjupattan (Sanskrit "Land Established by Manjusri"), now called Manjipā, and made Dharmākara its king. A shrine dedicated to Manjusri is still present in Majipā. No historical documents have been found after this era until the advent of the Gopal era. A genealogy of kings is recorded in a chronicle called Gopalarajavamsavali. According to this manuscript, the Gopal kings were followed by the Mahispals and the Kirats before the Licchavis entered from the south. Some claim Buddha visited Nepal during the reign of Kirat King Jitedasti. The Newars reign over the valley and their sovereignty and influence over neighboring territories ended with the conquest of the Kathmandu Valley in 1769 by the Gorkhali Shah dynasty founded by Prithvi Narayan Shah.

Prior to the Gorkha conquest, which began with the Battle of Kirtipur in 1767, the borders of Nepal Mandala extended to Tibet in the north, the nation of the Kirata in the east, the kingdom of Makwanpur in the south and the Trishuli River in the west which separated it from the kingdom of Gorkha.

=== Economic History ===
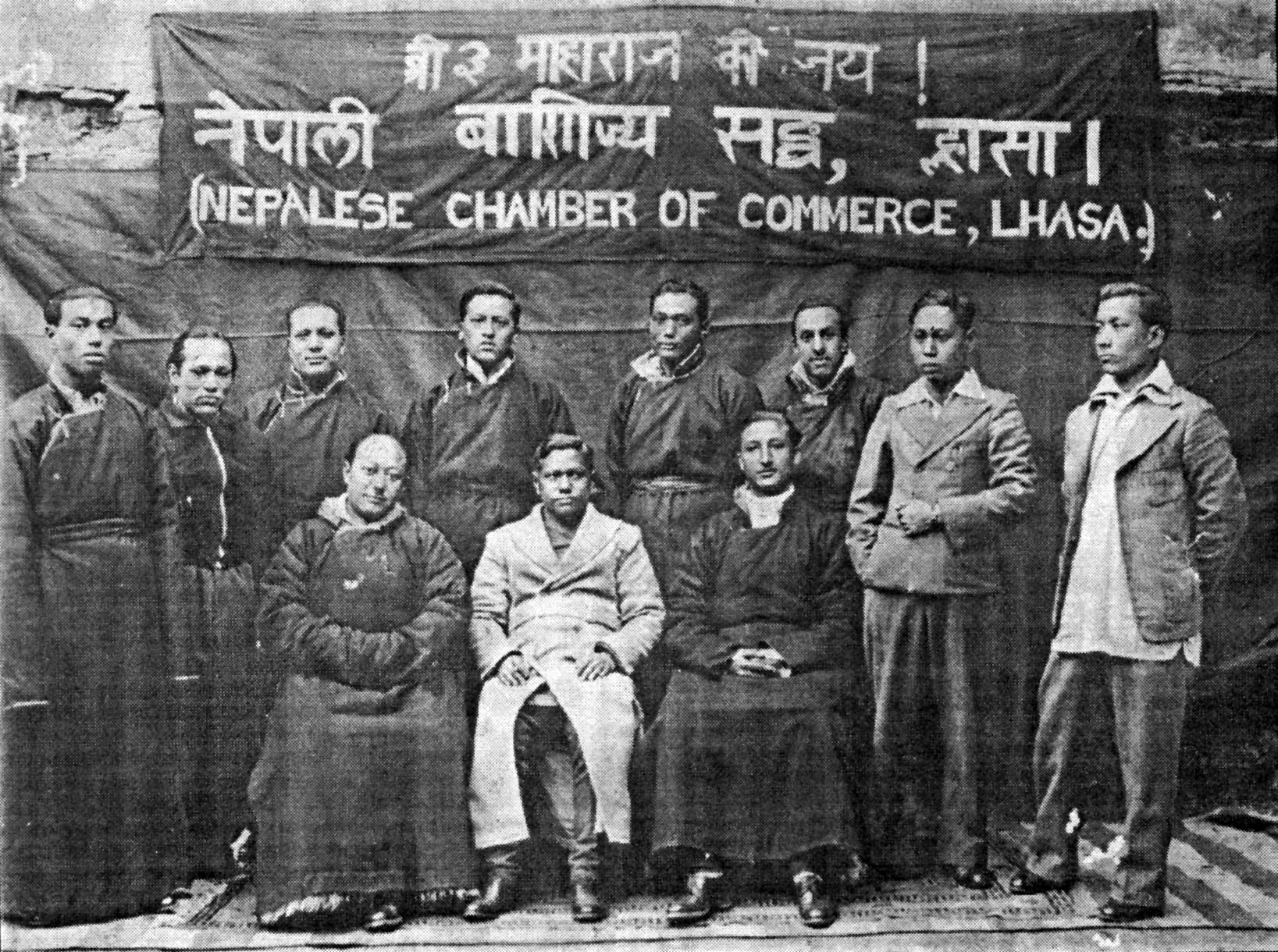
Newar traders in Lhasa in the 1940s.

Trade, industry and agriculture have been the mainstay of the economy of the Newars. They are made up of social groups associated with hereditary professions that provide ritual and economic services. Merchants, craftsmen, artists, potters, weavers, dyers, farmers and other castes all played their part in creating a flourishing economic system. Elaborate cultural traditions which required the use of varied objects and services also fueled the economy. Towns and villages in the Kathmandu Valley specialized in manufacturing particular goods, and rich agriculture produced a surplus for export.

For centuries, Newar merchants have handled trade between Tibet and India as well as exporting locally manufactured products to Tibet. Rice was another major export. Porters and pack mules transported merchandise over mountain tracks that formed the old trade routes. Since the 18th century, Newars have spread out across Nepal and established trading towns dotting the mid hills. They are known as jewelry makers and shopkeepers. Today, they are engaged in modern industry, business and service sectors.

== Castes and Communities ==
Newars form an ethnolinguistic community distinct from all the other ethnic groups of Nepal. Newars are divided into various endogamous clans or groups on the basis of their ancient hereditary occupations, deriving its roots in the classic late-Vedic Varna model. Although first introduced in the time of the Licchavis, the present Newar caste system assumed its present shape during the medieval Malla period.

- Artisan castes: "Ritually pure" occupational castes (Sat-Shudra): Balami (field workers and farmers), Bha/Karanjit (death ritual specialists), Chipā/Ranjitkar (dyers), Duhim/Putwar/Dali (carriers), Gathu/Mālākār/Mali (gardeners), Khusa/Tandukar (palanquin bearers/farmers), Pahari (farmers from Valley outskirts), Kau/Nakarmī (blacksmiths), Nau/Napit (barbers), Puñ/Chitrakar (painters), Sayami/Mānandhar (oilpressers and engineer), etc.
- Brahmin: The two main groups are: Kanyakubja Brahmin or Rajopadhyaya (Dyabhāju Brāhman) who are purohits for Hindu Newars and temple priests of important national shrines like Changu Narayan Temple, Taleju Bhawani, Kumbheshwar Temple, among others, and Maithil Brahmin (Jhā Bajé) who are mostly temple priests of smaller Hindu shrines and are lower in numbers than Rajopadhyayas.
- Chathariya Srēṣṭha: Kshatriya aristocratic bloc which includes Malla descendants, their numerous Hindu courtier clans Pradhan and Pradhananga (chief ministers and army chiefs), Amātya (ministers), Maskey (courtiers), Hada, Mathema, etc. and Kshatriya-status specialists like Joshi (astrologers), Vaidya (Ayurvedic practitioners), Rajbhandārī (royal treasurers), Rajvanshi (landed gentry) Karmāchārya (Tantric priests), Kayastha (scribes), among others.
- Chyamé/Chamaha: Traditionally fishermen, sweepers, and toilet cleaners. A Scheduled Caste.
- Dhobi: Traditionally washermen. A Scheduled Caste.
- Dyahla/Podé: Traditionally temple cleaners, fishermen, sweepers. A Scheduled Caste.
- Gubhāju/Bajracharya: Buddhist purohits and temple priests of Kathmandu's various Buddhist shrines. They can be auditioned as Kumari, a form of Taleju Goddess
- Jogi/Kapali (Newar caste): A caste associated as being descendants of the Kanphata Yogi sect. Also traditionally tailors, musicians (plays Mwaali baja). Previously, a Scheduled Caste.
- Jyapu: Traditionally farmers; the majority of the Newar population inside Kathmandu Valley. Includes Maharjan and (Farmers and Landowners). Also includes Suwāl, Basukala, etc. (Bhaktapur Hindu Jyapus), Kumhā/Prajapati (potterers and clay workers), Awalé (brickmakers), Sāpu (descendants of Gopāl dynasty), etc.
- Kulu/Dom: Traditionally leather workers. A Scheduled Caste.
- Nayé/Khadgi/Shahi: Traditionally traders of vegetables, meat and musicians. Previously, a Scheduled Caste, and the discrimination is slowly ending.
- Panchthariya Srēṣṭha: Chief Hindu trader and administrative class including Shrestha (administrators and traders).
- Rajkarnikar or Halwai: Traditional confectioners and sweetmakers.
- Shakya: Descendants of Lord Buddha's Shakya clan, Buddhist temple priests and also traditionally goldsmiths. They are also one of the few castes that can audition for being Kumari, a form of Taleju Goddess.
- Shilpakar: Wood carvers.
- Tamrakar: Trader and merchant group from Lalitpur; traditionally involved as coppersmiths.
- Urāya/Udās: Chief Buddhist trader, merchant and artisan group including Tuladhar and Bania (merchants), Kansakar (bronzesmiths), Sthapit, Kasthakar (architects/carpenters), and many more.

== Culture ==
=== Language ===
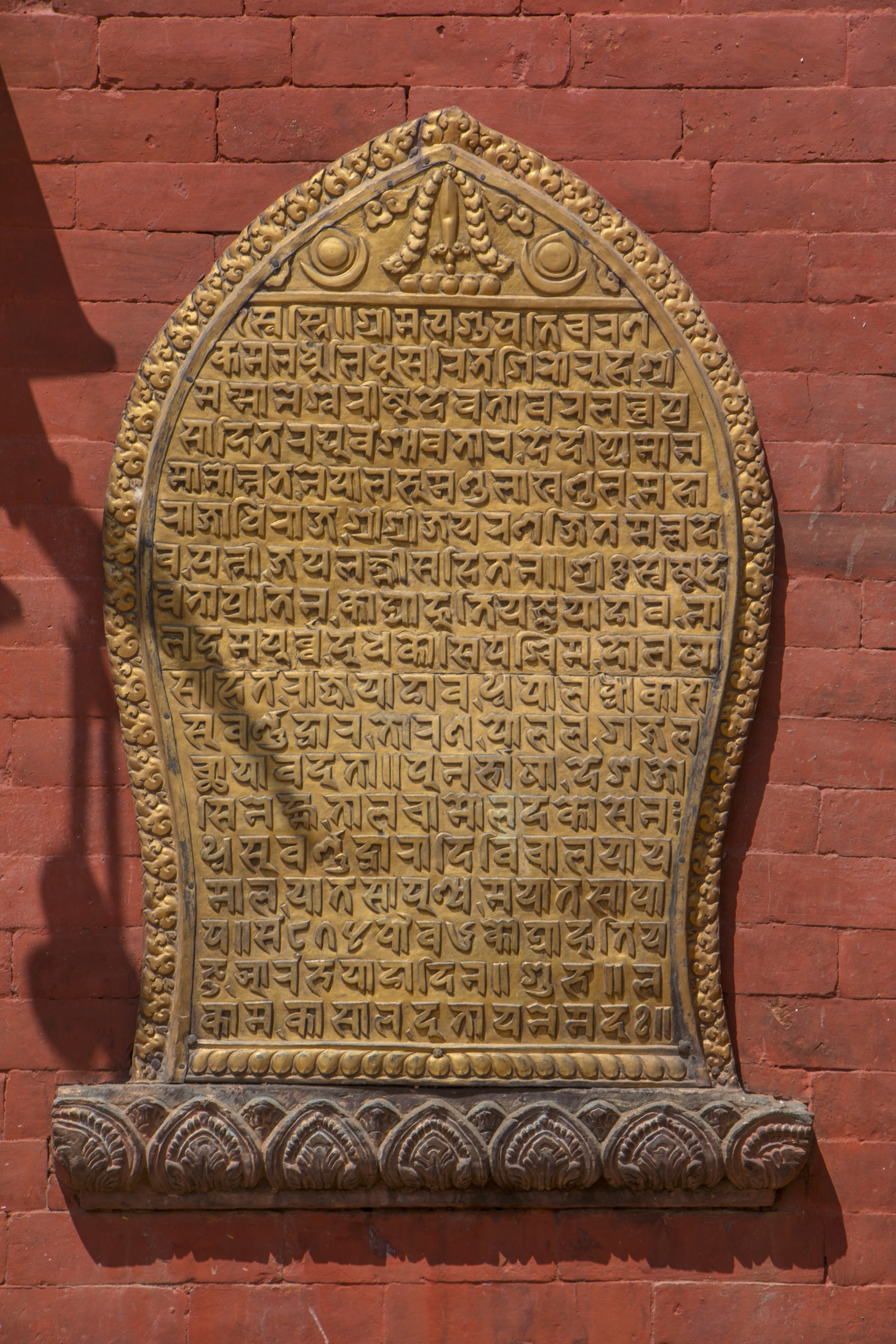
Nepal Bhasa inscription at Golden Gate, Bhaktapur

Nepal Bhasa, also known as Newar, belongs to the Tibeto-Burman branch of the Sino-Tibetan language family and is predominantly spoken by Newars in Nepal's Katmandu Valley. The name Nepal Bhasa is recognised and is also the name used in official contexts by the Government of Nepal. Newars are bound together by a common language and culture. Nepal Bhasa has five dialects, which are: Kathmandu-Lalitpur, Bhaktapur, Dolakha, Chitlang and Pahari. In 2011, there were approximately 846,000 native speakers of Nepal Bhasa.

Newari words appeared in the stone inscriptions from Licchavi period (400–879 CE), indicating that it already existed as a vernacular language during the Licchavi period. Nepal Bhasa became the lingua franca of the Kathmandu Valley and its surrounding regions during the medieval period. The earliest document written entirely in Nepal Bhasa is a palm-leaf manuscript from Uku Bahah dated 1114 CE. The first inscription written entirely in Nepal Bhasa is Bajrayogini Temple inscription of King Rudradeva from 1173 CE. Nepal Bhasa held a predominant place in the Early Malla dynasty (1200-1400 CE). It developed from the 14th to the late 18th centuries as the court and state language. Nepal Bhasa remained as state language until 1769 CE. Nepali language replaced Nepal Bhasa as the national language after the conquest of Nepal by the Shah Dynasty. From the start of the Rana dynasty in the 1840s until democratization, Nepal Bhasa suffered from official suppression. Currently, Nepal Bhasa is given official status in Bagmati province of Nepal, the Indian state of Sikkim and several city governments of Nepal including the capital Kathmandu.

=== Literature ===
Nepal Bhasa has one of the oldest literary tradition among the Tibeto-Burman languages. Literature in Nepal Bhasa is one of the oldest in Nepal, dating back to at least 600 years ago. Nepal Bhasa literature has three main literary genres—prose, poetry, and drama. Nepal Bhasa literature began as prose in the 14th century. The early books in Nepal Bhasa appeared in the 14th century such as Mānava Nyāyaśāstra (𑐩𑐵𑐣𑐰 𑐣𑑂𑐫𑐵𑐫𑐱𑐵𑐳𑑂𑐟𑑂𑐬), a law book written in 1380 and Gopālarāja Vaṃśāvalī (𑐐𑑀𑐥𑐵𑐮𑐬𑐵𑐖 𑐰𑑄𑐱𑐵𑐰𑐮𑐷), a chronicle written in 1389. Most of the early writings consist of prose including chronicles, popular stories and scientific manuals. The earliest storybook in Nepal Bhasa is a translation of the Bhagavata Purana from 1505, which was commissioned by Devakidevi, the daughter of King Bhuwana Malla. Later, various original stories such as Dhon Cholecha, Swasthani Bakhan appeared in Nepal Bhasa. Mahendra Malla (r. 1560-1574) is known as Ādikavi (first poet) of Nepal Bhasa, whose poems are the earliest known poems. The dramas are based on stories from the epics, and almost all of them were written during the 17th and 18th centuries. Jagat Prakasha Malla was the first playwright in Bhaktapur, who wrote plays in his mother tongue, Newari. Nepal Bhasa literature flourished for five centuries until 1850. Since then, it suffered a period of decline due to political oppression. The period 1909–1941 is known as the Nepal Bhasa renaissance period when writers defied official censure and braved imprisonment to create literary works. Modern Nepal Bhasa literature began in the 1940s with the emergence of new genres like short stories, essays, and novels.

=== Scripts ===
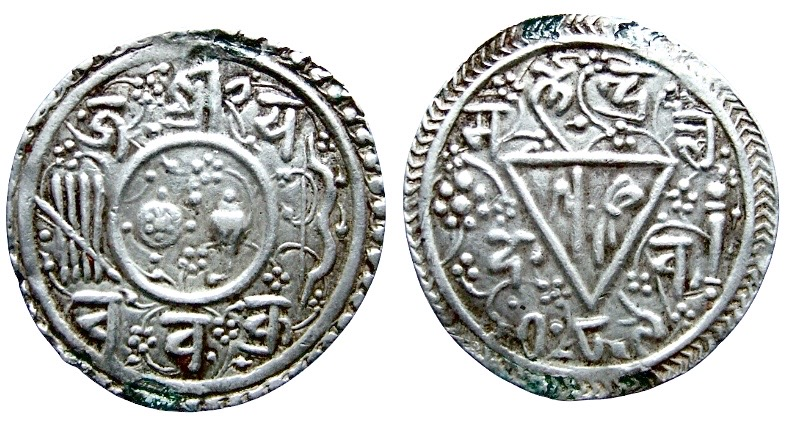
Coin of Kantipur with the name of Chakrabartendra Malla written in the Newar script, 1669 CE (NS 789).

Nepalese scripts is a group of scripts that developed from the Brahmi script and are used primarily to write Nepal Bhasa. Among the different scripts based on Nepalese scripts, Ranjana, Bhujimol and Newar are the most common. The Newar script, also known as Nepal Lipi, appeared in the 10th century. The Newar script is considered as the main script of the Newar people’s language. The Bhujimol script from the 11th century onward and the Ranjana script from the 12th century onward were used to write. For a thousand years, it was used on stone and copper plate inscriptions, coins (Nepalese mohar), palm-leaf documents and Hindu and Buddhist manuscripts. The scripts originally used for Newar language fell into disuse at the beginning of the 20th century when writing in the language and the script was banned, which resulted in the emergence of the Devanagari script. However, in past decades attempts are being made for revival.

=== Dance ===
Di Pyakhan performed during Indra Jatra

Kartik Naach, a Newar dance drama performed at Patan in the month of Kartik.

The Newar dance consists of sacred masked dance, religious dance without the use of masks known as Dyah Pyakhan, dance performed as part of a ritual and meditation practice known as Chachaa Pyakhan (Newar: चचा प्याखं) (Charya Nritya in Sanskrit) and folk dance. There are also masked dance dramas known as Daboo Pyakhan which enact religious stories to the accompaniment of music. The dance done to the tune of Dhime is called the Dhime dance.

=== Music ===
Traditional Newar music consists of sacred music, devotional songs, seasonal songs, ballads and folk songs. One of the most well-known seasonal songs is Sitala Maju. The ballad describes the expulsion of children from Kathmandu in the early 19th century. Another seasonal song Silu is about a pilgrimage to Gosaikunda that went wrong. Ji Waya La Lachhi Maduni is a tragedy song about a newly married couple. The ballad Rajamati about unlucky lovers is widely popular. In 1908, maestro Seturam Shrestha made the first recording of the Rajamati song on gramophone disc in Kolkata.

Common percussion instruments consist of the dhimay, khin, naykhin and dhaa. Wind instruments include the bansuri (flute), payntah (long trumpet) and mwahali (short trumpet), chhusya, bhusya, taa (cymbals), and gongs are other popular instruments. String instruments are very rare. The musical style and musical instruments are still in use today. Musical bands accompany religious processions in which an idol of a deity is placed in a chariot or portable shrine and taken around the city. Devotional songs are known as bhajan are sung daily in community houses. Hymn societies like Gyanmala Bhajan Khala hold regular recitals. Dapha songs are sung during hymn singing seasons at Temple squares and sacred courtyards. Gunla Bajan musical bands parade through the streets during Gunla, the 10th month of the Nepal Sambat calendar which is a holy month for Newar Buddhists. Musical performances start with an overture which is a salutation to the gods. Seasonal songs and ballads are associated with particular seasons and festivals. Music is also played during wedding processions, life-cycle ceremonies and funeral processions.

=== Art ===
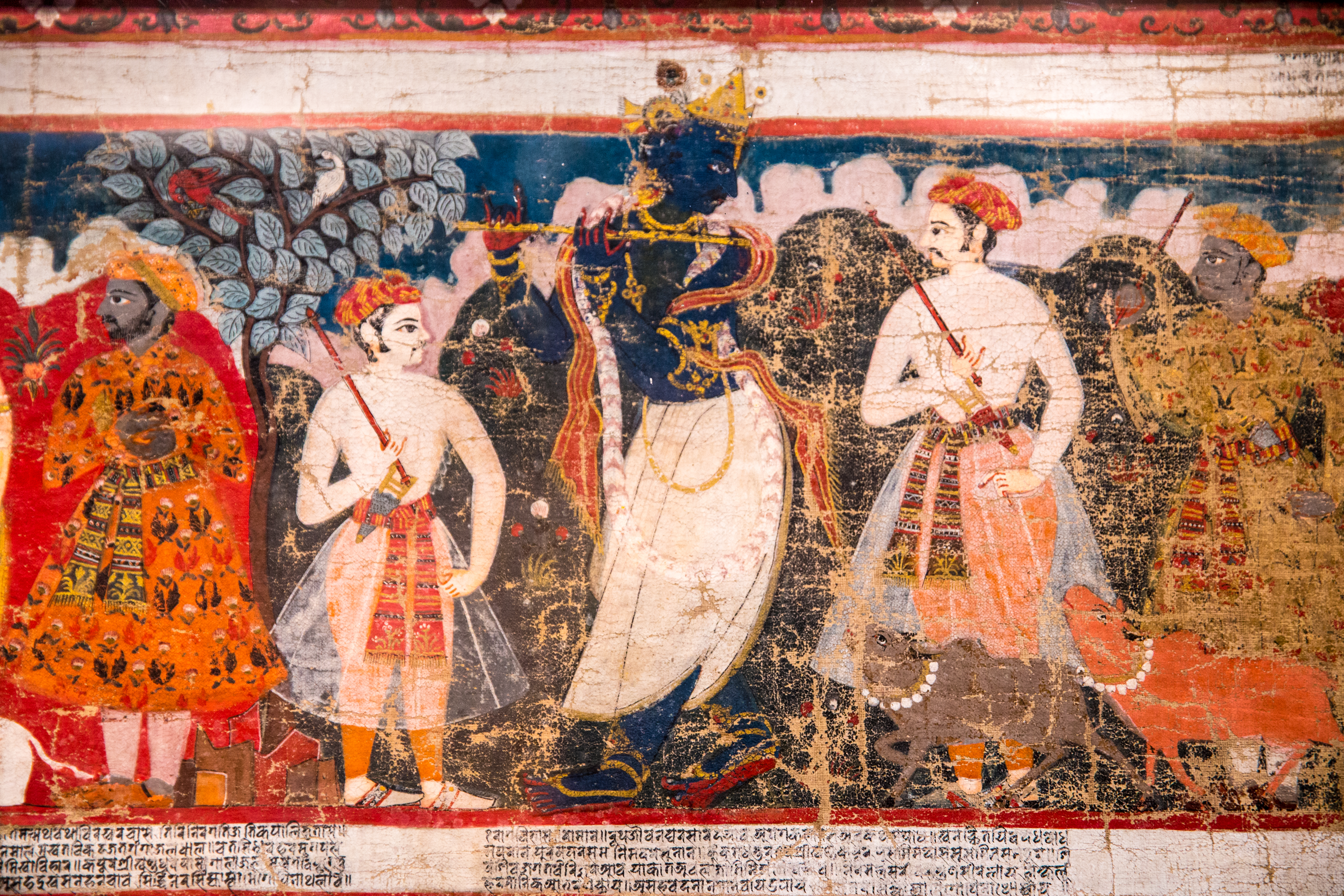
A Paubha painting inside the Patan Museum

The Newars are the creators of most examples of art and architecture in Nepal. Traditional Newar art is primarily religious art. Newar devotional paubha painting, sculpture and metal craftsmanship are world-renowned for their exquisite beauty. The earliest dated paubha discovered so far is Vasudhara Mandala which was painted in 1365 CE (NS 485). The murals on the walls of two 15th-century monasteries in the former kingdom of Mustang in the Nepal Himalaya provide illustrations of Newar works outside the Kathmandu Valley. Stone sculpture, wood carving, repoussé art and metal statues of Buddhist and Hindu deities made by the lost-wax casting process are specimens of Newar artistry.

Besides exhibiting a high level of skill in traditional religious art, Newar artists have been at the forefront of introducing Western art styles in Nepal. Raj Man Singh Chitrakar (1797–1865) is credited with starting watercolor painting in the country. Bhaju Man Chitrakar (1817–1874), Tej Bahadur Chitrakar (1898–1971) and Chandra Man Singh Maskey were other pioneer artists who introduced modern style paintings incorporating concepts of lighting and perspective.

=== Architecture ===
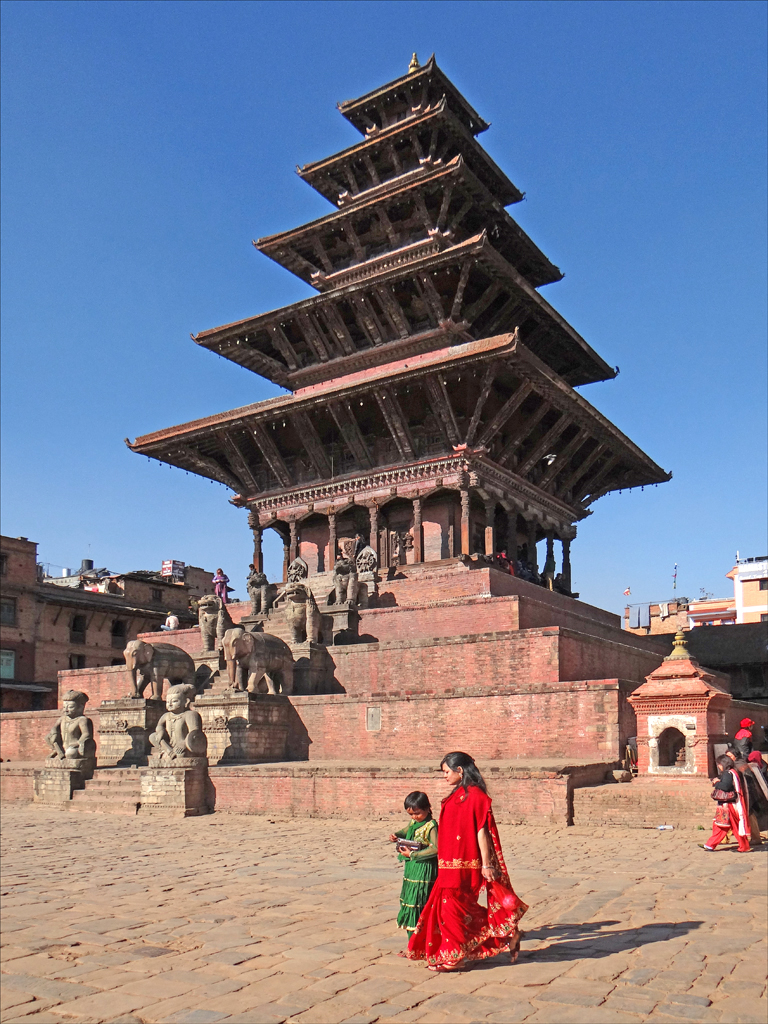
Nyatapola Temple

Newar window panel at Kathmandu Durbar Square

There are seven UNESCO World Heritage Sites and 2,500 temples and shrines in the Kathmandu Valley that illustrate the skill and aesthetic sense of Newar artisans. Fine brickwork and woodcarving are the marks of Newar architecture. Newar architecture is characterised by artistic windows and doors set into bare brick walls. The intricate carvings mostly depict religious motifs, ritual objects, mythical beasts and birds. The level of design and carving of the Newar window reached its peak in the mid-18th century. They are found on palaces, private residences and sacred houses across Nepal Mandala. Desay Madu Jhya is a specimen of the woodcarving heritage of the Newar people of Nepal which goes back more than a thousand years.

Newar architecture consists of the pagoda, shikhara, stupa, chaitya and other styles. Residential houses, monastic courtyards known as bahal and bahil, rest houses, temples, stupas, priest houses and palaces are the various architectural structures found in the valley. Building elements like the carved Newar window, roof struts on temples and the tympanum of temples and shrine houses exhibit traditional creativity. Most of the chief monuments are located in the Durbar Squares of Kathmandu, Lalitpur and Bhaktapur, the old royal palace complexes built between the 12th and 18th centuries. The valley's trademark is the multiple-roofed pagoda which may have originated in this area and spread to India, China, Indochina and Japan. From as early as the seventh century, visitors have noted the skill of Newar artists and craftsmen who left their influence on the art of Tibet and China. The most famous artisan who influenced stylistic developments in China and Tibet was Arniko, a Newar youth who traveled to the court of Kublai Khan in the 13th century CE. Newars introduced the lost-wax technique into Bhutan and they were commissioned to paint murals on the walls of monasteries there.

=== Settlements ===
Durbar squares, temple squares, sacred courtyards, stupas, open-air shrines, dance platforms, sunken water fountains, public rest houses, bazaars, multistoried houses with elaborately carved windows and compact streets are the characteristics of traditional planning. Besides the historical cities of Kathmandu, Lalitpur, Bhaktapur, Madhyapur Thimi, Chovar, Bungamati, Thankot and Kirtipur, small towns with a similar artistic heritage (like Panga in Kirtipur municipality) dot the Kathmandu Valley where almost half of the Newar population lives.

Outside the valley, historical Newar settlements include Nuwakot, Nala, Banepa, Dhulikhel, Panauti, Dolakha, Chitlang and Bhimphedi. The Newars of Kathmandu founded Pokhara in 1752 at the invitation of the rulers of Kaski. Over the last two centuries, Newars have fanned out of the Kathmandu Valley and established trade centers and settled in various parts of Nepal. Bandipur, Baglung, Silgadhi and Tansen in west Nepal and Chainpur and Bhojpur in east Nepal contain large Newar populations.

Outside Nepal, many Newars have settled in Darjeeling and Kalimpong in West Bengal, Assam, Manipur and Sikkim, India. In Sikkim, many Newars became Taksaris helping the former kingdom in establishing a coinage system. Later they were made Thikadars or Sikkimese feudal lords with judicial and administrative powers within their respective estates. Newars have also settled in Bhutan. Colonies of expatriate Newar merchants and artisans existed in Lhasa, Shigatse and Gyantse in Tibet till the mid-1960s when the traditional trade came to an end after the Sino-Indian War. In recent times, Newars have moved to different parts of Asia, Europe and North America.

=== Festivals ===
Chariot pulled in procession during Biska Jatra in Thimi

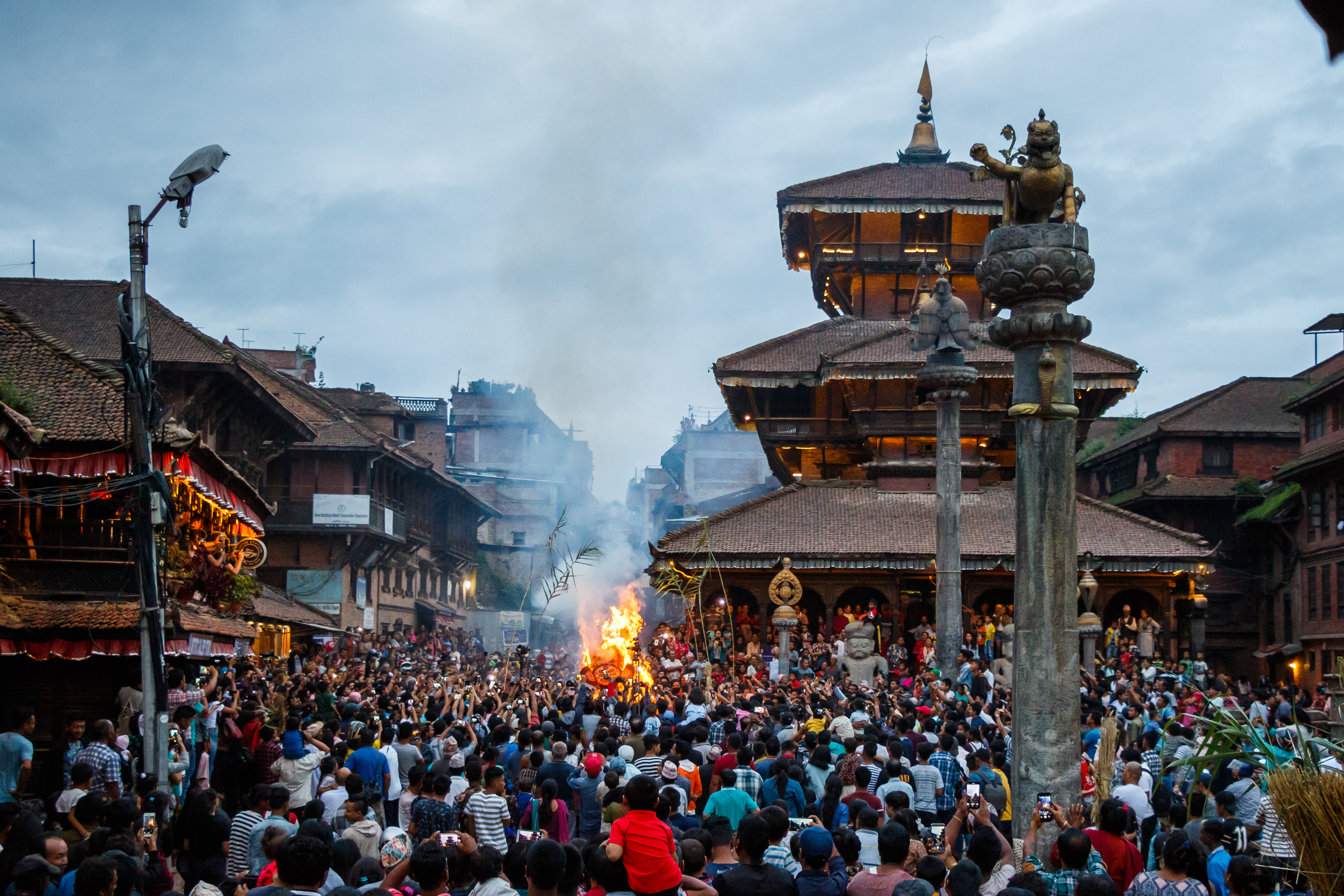
Gathamuga festival

Newar religious culture is rich in ceremony and is marked by frequent festivals throughout the year. Many festivals are tied to Hindu and Buddhist holidays and the harvest cycle. Street celebrations include pageants, jatras or processions in which a car or portable shrine is paraded through the streets and sacred masked dances. Other festivals are marked by family feasts and worship. The celebrations are held according to the lunar calendar, so the dates are changeable.

Mohani is one of the greatest annual celebrations which is observed for several days with feasts, religious services, and processions. During Swanti, Newars celebrate New Year's Day of Nepal Sambat by doing Mha Puja, a ritual in which our own body is worshipped, which is believed to purifies and strengthens one spiritually for the coming year. Similarly, Kija Puja is also done during Swanti. It is a ritual observed to worship and respect a woman's brothers, with or without blood relation. Another major festival is Sā Pāru when people who have lost a family member in the past year dress up as cows and saints, and parade through the town, following a specific route. In some cases, a real cow may also be a part of the parade. People give such participants money, food and other gifts as a donation. Usually, children are the participants of the parade. In Kathmandu, the biggest street festival is Yenya (Indra Jatra) when three cars bearing the living goddess Kumari and two other child gods are pulled through the streets and masked dance performances are held. The two godchildren are Ganesh and Bhairav. Another major celebration is Pahan Charhe when portable shrines bearing images of mother goddesses are paraded through Kathmandu. During the festival of Jana Baha Dyah Jatra, a temple car with an image of Karunamaya is drawn through central Kathmandu for three days. A similar procession is held in Lalitpur known as Bunga Dyah Jatra which continues for a month and climaxes with Bhoto Jatra, the display of the sacred vest. The biggest outdoor celebration in Bhaktapur is Biska Jatra which is marked by chariot processions and lasts for nine days. Sithi Nakha is another big festival when worship is offered and natural water sources are cleaned. In addition, all Newar towns and villages have their particular festival which is celebrated by holding a chariot or palanquin procession.

=== Clothing ===
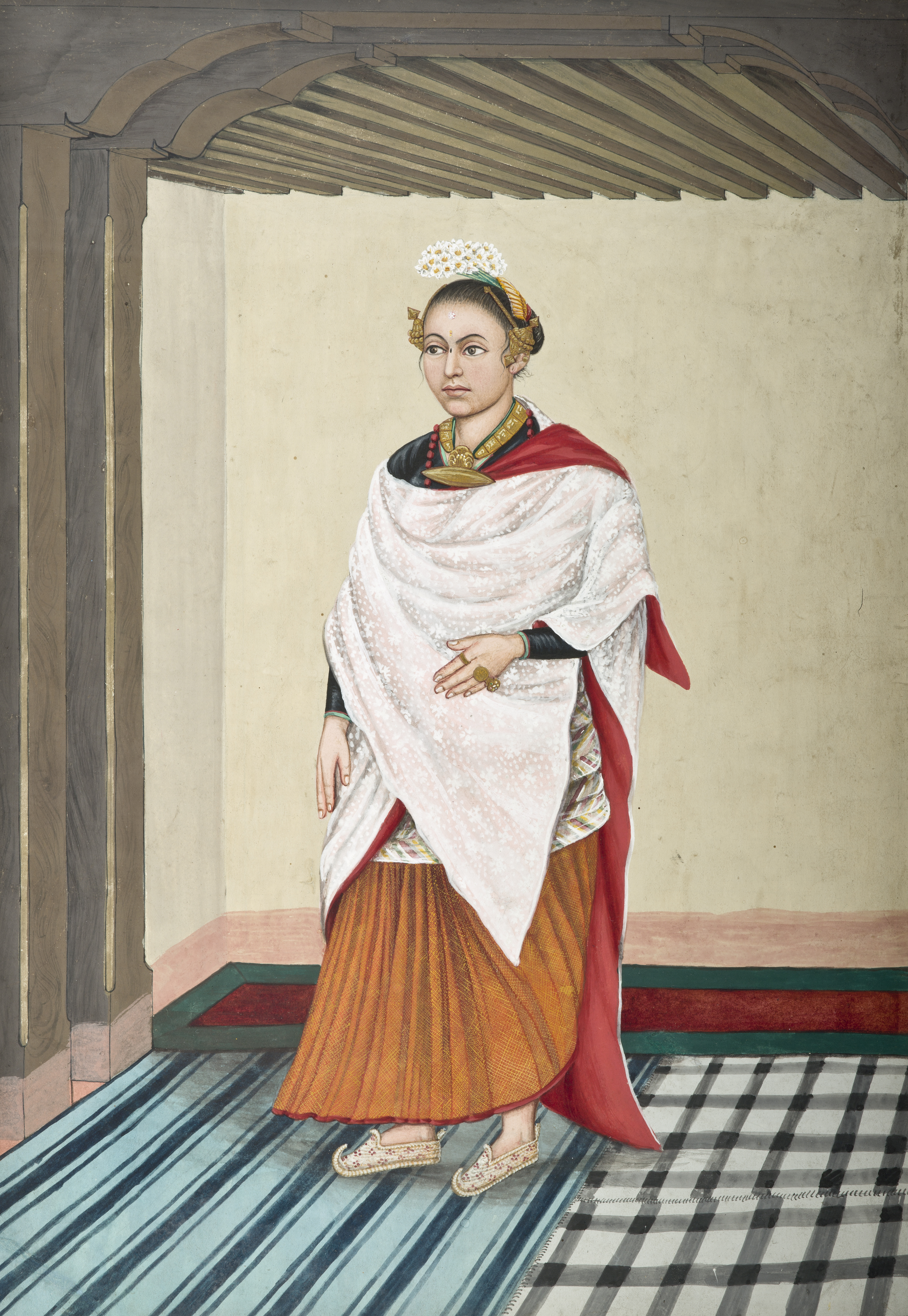
A Newar woman wearing parsi, circa 1860–1900

Western wear is the norm as in urban areas in the rest of the country. Traditionally men wear tapuli (cap), long shirt (tapālan) and trousers (suruwā), also called Daura-Suruwal. Women wear cheeparsi (sari) and gaa (long length shawl) while younger girls wear ankle-length gowns (bhāntānlan). Ritual dresses consist of pleated gowns, coats and a variety of headdresses. Jyapu women have a distinctive sari called Hāku Patāsi which is a black sari with distinctive red border. Jyapu men also have a distinctive version of the tapālan suruwā. Similarly, a shawl (gā) is worn by men and women. Traditionally, Newar women wear a shoe made out of red cloth, Kapa lakaan. It is decorated with glitters and colorful beads (potya). One of the major parts of Newar dress includes bracelets (chūra) and mala (necklaces).

=== Cuisine ===
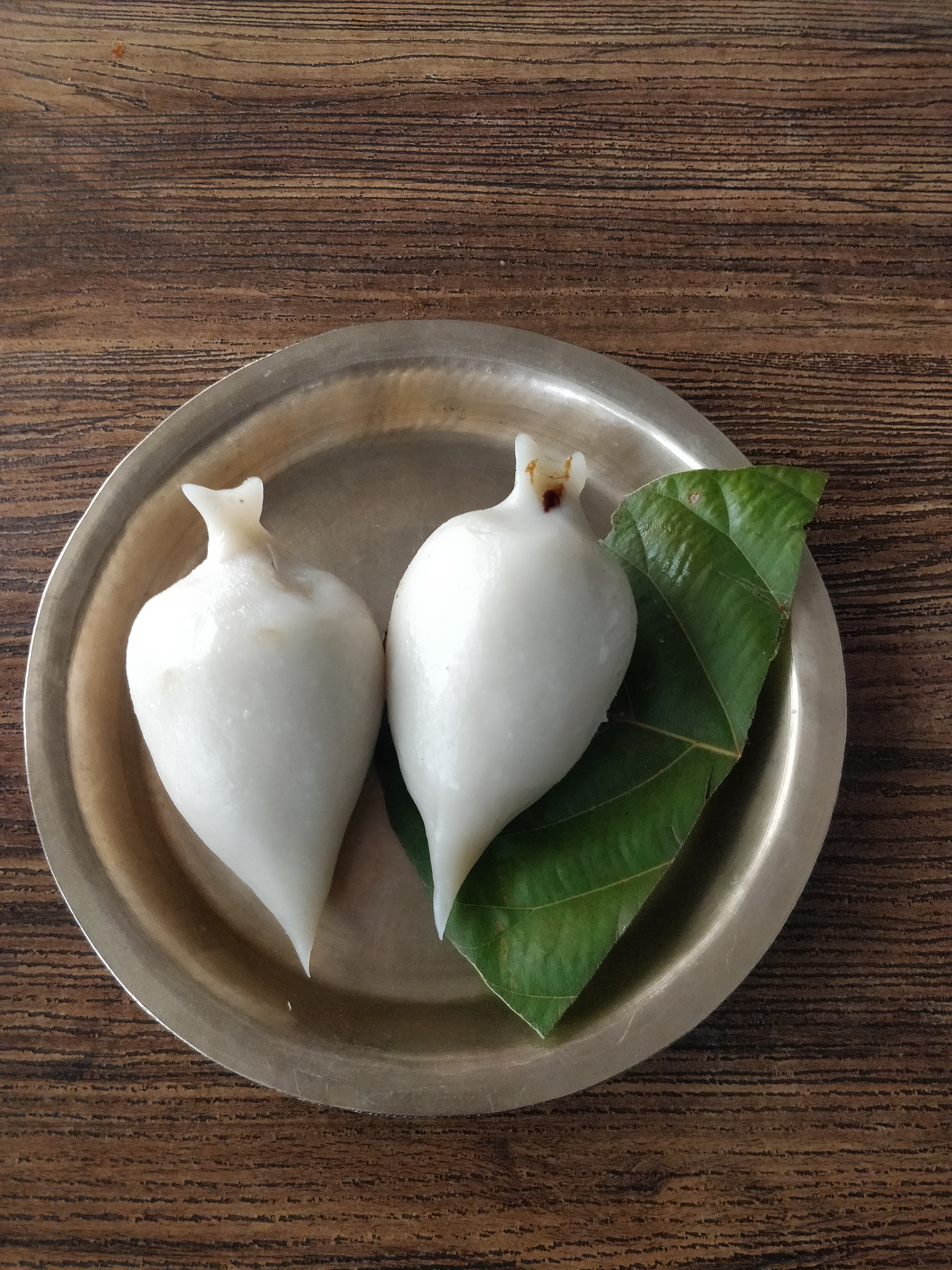
One of the popular sweet, "Yomari"

Newar cuisine, one of the richest and most influential in Nepal, is more elaborate and diverse than most, as Newar culture developed in the highly fertile and prosperous Kathmandu valley. Meals can be classified into three main categories: the daily meal, the afternoon snack and festival food. The daily meal consists of boiled rice, lentil soup, vegetable curry, relish, and meat. The snack generally consists of beaten rice, roasted and curried soybeans, curried potato and roasted meat mixed with spices. Food is also an important part of the ritual and religious life of the Newars, and the dishes served during festivals and feasts have symbolic significance. Different sets of ritual dishes are placed in a circle around the staple Baji (rice flakes or flattened) to represent and honour different sets of deities depending on the festival or life-cycle ceremony.

A typical Newar meal can comprise more than a dozen dishes of cereals, meat, vegetable curries, chutneys and pickles. Kwāti (soup of different beans), kachilā (spiced minced meat), chhoyalā (water buffalo meat marinated in spices and grilled over the flames of dried wheat stalks), pukālā (fried meat), takhālā (jellied meat), swan pukā (stuffed lungs), syen (fried liver), mye (fried tongue), sapu mhichā (leaf tripe stuffed with bone marrow), sanyā khunā (jellied fish soup), paun kwā (sour soup), wo (lentil cake), chatāmari (rice flour crepe) and gwārāmari (fluffy bread) are some of the popular festival foods. Dessert consists of dhau (yogurt), sisābusā (fruits), yomari and lakhamari. Thwon (rice beer) and aylā (local alcohol) are the common alcoholic liquors that Newars make at home. Traditionally, at meals, festivals and gatherings, Newars sit on long mats in rows. Typically, the sitting arrangement is hierarchical with the eldest sitting at the top and the youngest at the end. Newar cuisine makes use of mustard oil and a host of spices such as cumin, sesame seeds, turmeric, garlic, ginger, mint, bay leaves, cloves, cinnamon, pepper, chilli and mustard seeds. Food is served in lapte (plates made of special leaves, held together by sticks). Similarly, any soups are served in botā (bowls made of leaves). Liquors are served in Sali (bowls made of clay) and Khwalā (small metal bowls).

=== Life-cycle ceremonies ===
Elaborate ceremonies chronicle the life cycle of a Newar from birth till death. Newars consider life-cycle rituals as a preparation for death and the life after it. Hindus and Buddhists alike perform the "Sorha Sanskaar Karma" or the 16 sacred rites of passage, unavoidable in a Hindu person's life. The 16 rites have been shortened to 10 and called "10 Karma Sanskar" (Newar: दश कर्म संस्कार). These include important events of a person's life like "Jatakarma" (Newar: जातकर्म) (Childbirth), "Namakaran" (Newar: नामकरण) (Naming the child), "Annapraasan" (Newar: अन्नप्राशन) (First rice feeding ceremony), "Chudakarma" or "Kaeta Puja" (first hair shaving and loin cloth ceremony), "Vivaaha" (Newar: विवाह) (Wedding), among others.

- Macha Janku

This is the rice feeding ceremony, "Annapraasan" (Newar: अन्नप्राशन). It is performed at the age of six or eight months for boys and at the age of five or seven months for girls.

- Chudakarma ceremony and (Bare Chuyegu/Acharyabhisheka or Bratabandha/Upanayana)

Bratabandha ceremony

One such important rite of passage ceremony among the male Newars is performing the loin-cloth and head-shaving ceremony called Chudākarma (Newar: चुडाकर्म) followed by the Bratabandha or Kaeta Puja (Newar: काएत पूजा) which is traditionally performed for boys aged five to thirteen according to the religious affiliation Newars identify with.

Hindu Newars perform the male initiation ceremony called Kaeta Puja as a ritual observance of the brahmachārya – the first stage in the traditional four stages of life. During the ritual, the young boy renounces family and lineage for the celibate religious life. His head is fully shaved except a tuft in the top, he must don yellow/orange robes of the mendicant, he must beg rice from his relatives and prepare to wander out into the world. Having this symbolically fulfilled the ascetic ideal, he can be called back by his family to assume the life of a householder and his eventual duty as a husband and a father. Twice-born (Brahmin and Kshatriya) Newars – Rajopādhyāyas and Chatharīyas – additionally perform the Upanayana initiation where the boy receives his sacred thread (Sanskrit: यज्ञोपवीत) and the secret Vedic mantras – RV.3.62.10 (Gāyatrī mantra) for Brahmins and RV.1.35.2 (Shiva mantra) for Chatharīyas. The boy is then fully inducted into his caste status as a Dvija with the obligation to observe henceforth all commensal rules and other caste obligations(Newar: कर्म चलेको). In this ceremony, Buddhist Newars – Gubhāju-Baré (Bajracharya-Shakya), Urāy, Jyapu and few artisan castes like Chitrakār – perform their Pravrajyā (Sanskrit: प्रवराज्या) ceremony by mimicking Gautama Buddha's ascetic and medicant lifestyle and the steps to attain monkhood and nirvana where the boy stays in a Buddhist monastery, Vihara, for three days, living the life of a monk and abandoning all material pleasures. On the fourth day, he disrobes and returns to his family and henceforth becomes a householder Buddhist for the rest of his life. The Buddhist priestly clan Gubhāju-Baré (Bajracharya and Shakya) go through an additional initiation ceremony called Bare Chuyegu (becoming a Baré) while Bajracharya boys are further required to go through Acharyabhisheka (Sanskrit: आचार्याभिषेक) which is a Tantric initiation rite that qualifies a Bajracharya to perform as a purohita.

- Ihi ceremony

For a female child, Ihi (Ehee)(Newar: ईहि) short for Ihipaa (Eheepā)(Newar: ईहिपा) (Marriage) is performed between the ages of five and nine. It is a ceremony in which pre-adolescent girls are "married" to the bael fruit (wood apple), which is a symbol of the god Shiva. It is believed that if the girl's husband dies later in her life, she is not considered a widow because she is married to Shiva, and so already has a husband that is believed to be still alive.

- Bahra

Girls have yet another ceremonial ritual called Bahra Chuyegu(Newar: बराह चुयेगु) when a girl approaches puberty. This is done in her odd number year like 7, 9 or 11 before menstruation. She is kept in a room for 12 days hidden and is ceremonially married to the sun god Surya.

- Vivaaha

The next ceremony common to both men and women is marriage. The Newar custom, similar to that of Hindus, is that the bride almost always leaves home at marriage and moves into her husband's home and adopts her husband's family name as her own. Cross-cousin and parallel-cousin marriage is forbidden. Marriage is usually arranged by parents who use a gobetween (lamee). Marriage by elopement is popular in some peripheral villages. The Sagan ceremony where auspicious food items are presented is an important part of life-cycle rituals.

- Jankwa

Jankwa or Janku is an old-age ceremony which is conducted when a person reaches the age of 77 years, seven months, seven days, seven hours, seven minutes, seven-quarter. Three further Janku ceremonies are performed at similar auspicious milestones at age 83, 88 and 99. The first Janwa is called "Bhimratharohan", the second "Chandraratharohan", the third "Devaratharohan", and the fourth "Divyaratharohan". After the second Jankwa, the person is accorded deified status.

- Antima Samskara

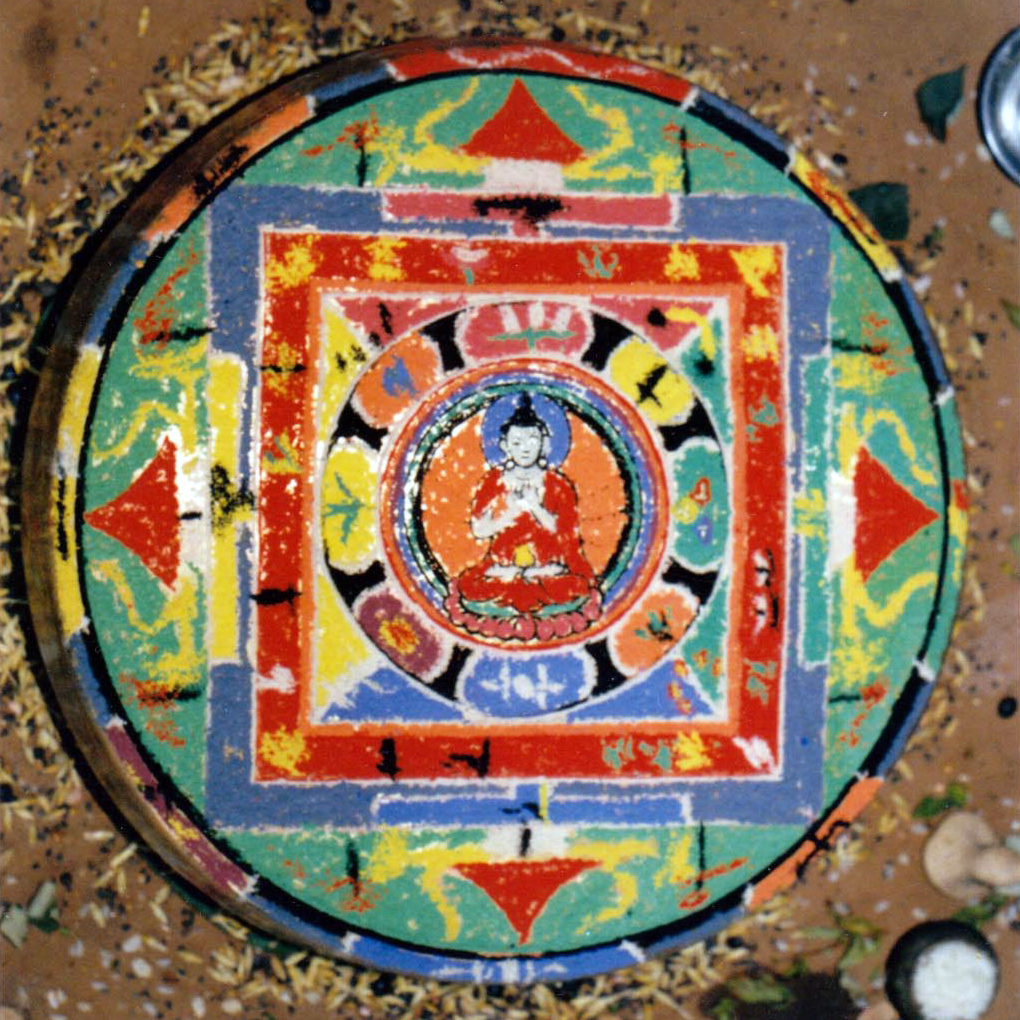
Mandala made on the third day after death as part of death rituals among Buddhist Newars

All Newars, except the Laakumi and Jogi caste, cremate their dead. The Jogis bury their dead. As part of the funeral, offerings are made to the spirit of the deceased, the crow and the dog. The crow and the dog represent ancestors and the god of death. Subsequently, offerings and rituals are conducted four, seven, eight, 13 and 45 days following death and monthly for a year and then annually. Buddhist Newars also make a mandala (sand painting) depicting the Buddha on the third day after death which is preserved for four days.

=== Games ===
The games which had been played by prasanga people from their ancient time can be classified as Newa games. Kana kana picha (Blindfold game), Piyah (a game played with stones by pushing stone within the marks drawn on the ground), Gatti ( another game played with stone by hand), pasa are some games played by Newar people since ancient time.

=== Newa Autonomous State ===
Newa Autonomous State is a proposed federal state of Nepal which establishes the historical native homeland of Newa people as a federal state. The historical territories of Newars is called Nepal Mandala. The Newa Autonomous State mandates to reconstruct the district division and create an autonomous Newa province. It includes historically Newa residing settlements and Newa dominant zones of Kathmandu, Bhaktapur, Lalitpur, Newa towns of Dolakha, Newa settlements of Nuwakot, Newa settlements of Makwanpur, Newa settlements of Ramechhap, Newa settlements of Sindhupalchowk, Newa settlements of Kavre West.

== Religion ==
Religion of Newar people (2021)
1. Hinduism (89.1%)
2. Buddhism (9.00%)
3. Christianity (1.90%)

According to the 2021 Nepal census, 89.1% of the Newars were Hindu, 9.0% were Buddhist, and 1.9% were Christian.

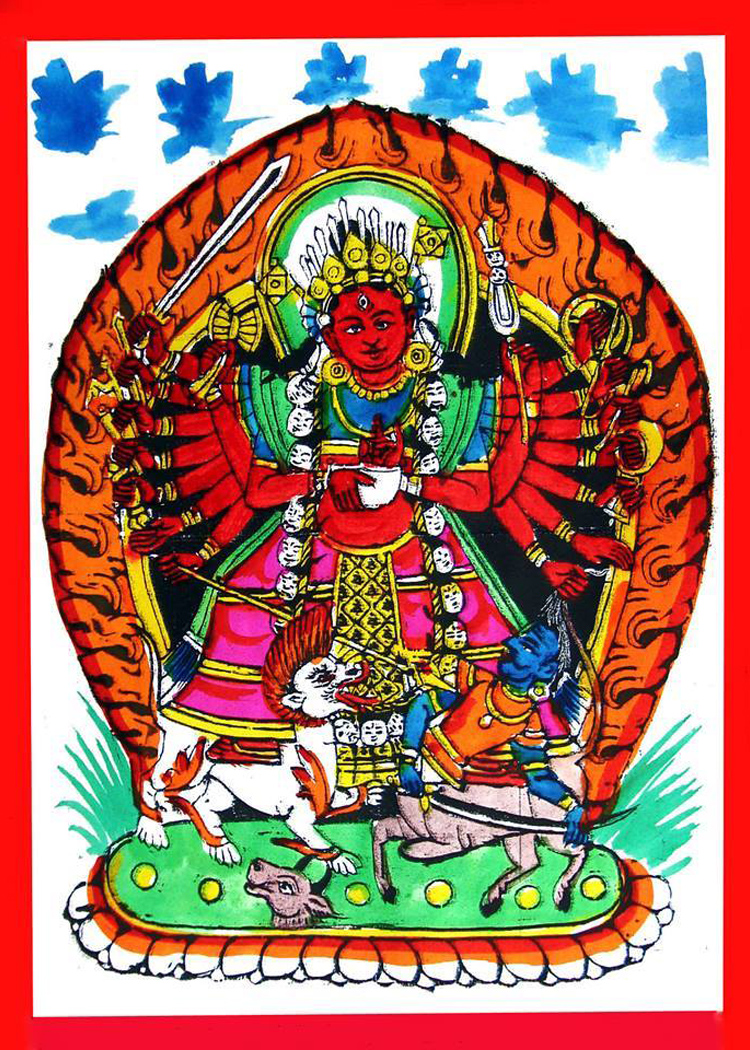
Newar portrayal of Chandi

Out of the three main cities of the Kathmandu Valley which are historically Newar, the city of Patan is the most Buddhist containing the four stupas built by Indian emperor Ashoka. Bhaktapur is primarily Hindu, while Kathmandu is a mix of both. Generally, both Hindu and Buddhist deities are worshiped and festivals are celebrated by both religious groups. However, for ritual activities, Hindu and Buddhist Newars have their own priests (Rajopadhyaya Brahmins for Hindus and Vajracharyas for Buddhists) and varying amounts of cultural differences.

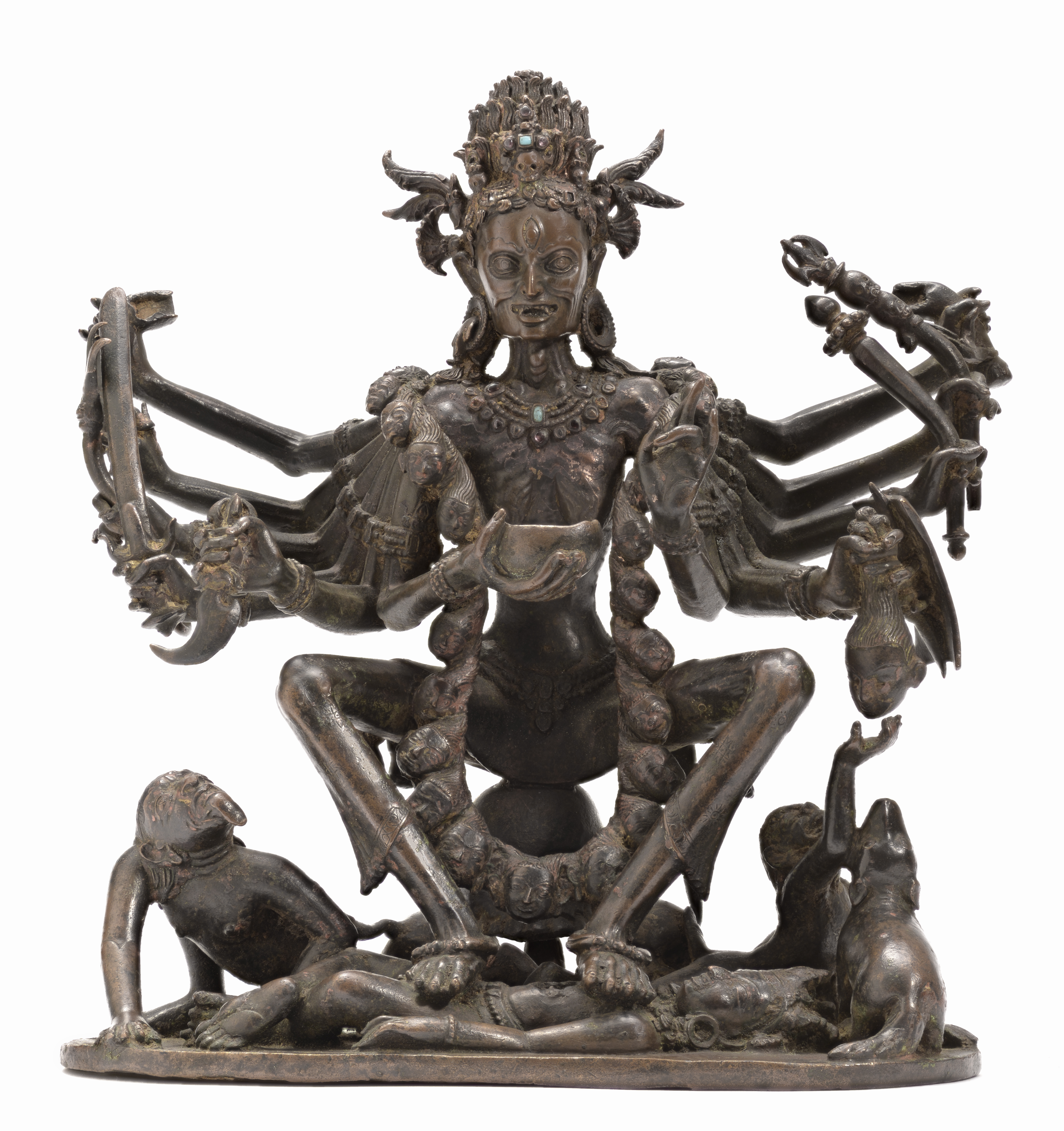
14th century Nepalese sculpture of Hindu goddess Chamunda

Religiously, the majority of Newars can be classified as both Hindu and Buddhist. The major cults are Vajrayana Buddhism and Tantric Hinduism. The former is referred to as Buddhamarga, the latter as Sivamarga. Both creeds have been established since antiquity in the valley. Both Buddhamargi and Sivamargi Newars are Tantricists. Within the Newar community, many different esoteric Tantric followers of Buddhist, Shaiva, and Vaishnava denominations are practiced. In this regard, followers of the Mother Goddesses and their consorts, the Bhairavas, are particularly important. The most important shrines in the Valley are Swayambhunath (Buddhist) and Pashupatinath (Hindu). Different castes worship different deities at different occasions, and more or less intensively. Only the higher echelons in the caste system claim to be exclusively Buddhist or Hindu. The Vajracharyas, Buddhist priests, will adamantly maintain that they are Buddhists, and so will the Bare (Shakya). Kathmandu Uray (Tuladhars, etc.) as well as the Sayamis (Manandhars) will also strongly maintain their Buddhist heritage. On the other hand, the Dyabhāju Brāhman, the Jha Brāhman, and the dominant Shresthas will maintain that they are Hindus. Further down in the caste hierarchy, no distinction is made between Buddhists and Hindus, although preponderance towards Hinduism and worship of Hindu gods is much more prevalent among these castes. Hindus and Buddhists alike always worship Ganesh first in every ritual, and every locality has its local Ganesh shrine (Ganesh Than).

Although Newar Buddhism (Vajrayana) had been traditionally practiced in the Kathmandu Valley, Theravada Buddhism made a comeback in Nepal in the 1920s and now is a common form of Buddhism among Buddhamargi Newars.

From the 17th century onwards, Catholic Christian missionaries of the Jesuit and Capuchin religious orders "established hospices at Kathmandu, Patan and Bhatgoan, the capitals of the three Malla Kings of Nepal who had permitted them to preach Christianity." An indigenous Newar Christian community thus became established. When the Mallas were overthrown by the Gurkhas, the Newar Christians took refuge in India, settling first in the city of Bettiah and then later moving eleven kilometres north to Chuhari.

== Notable Newar people ==
=== Politicians and jurists ===
- Marich Man Singh Shrestha, former Prime Minister of Nepal
- Gehendra Bahadur Rajbhandari, former acting Prime Minister of Nepal
- Narayan Man Bijukchhe, founder of the Nepal Workers Peasants Party
- Pushpa Lal Shrestha, founder of the Communist Party of Nepal
- Nara Bahadur Karmacharya, founding member of the Communist Party of Nepal
- Sahana Pradhan, Deputy Prime Minister (2007–2008)
- Narayan Kaji Shrestha, Deputy Prime Minister (2011–2012)
- Gopal Man Shrestha, Deputy Prime Minister (2014–2015)
- Hari Prasad Pradhan, First Chief Justice of Nepal (1951–1956)
- Om Bhakta Shrestha, Chief Justice of Nepal (1997–1998)
- Govinda Bahadur Shrestha, Chief Justice of Nepal (2004–2005)
- Ram Prasad Shrestha, Chief Justice of Nepal (2010–2011)
- Kalyan Shrestha, Chief Justice of Nepal (2015–2016)
- Bishowambhar Prasad Shrestha, Chief Justice of Nepal (2023–2024)
- Sapana Pradhan Malla, Judge of Supreme Court of Nepal, (2016–present)
- Padma Ratna Tuladhar, politician and human rights activist
- Kaji Manik Lal Rajbhandari, politician and first graduate of Nepal
- Hora Prasad Joshi, politician

=== Freedom fighters and democracy activists ===
- Shukra Raj Shastri, freedom fighter and martyr
- Dharma Bhakta Mathema, freedom fighter and martyr
- Gangalal Shrestha, freedom fighter and martyr
- Ganesh Man Singh, freedom fighter and leader
- Kashiraj Pradhan, pro-democracy leader in the erstwhile Kingdom of Sikkim
- Nahakul Pradhan, pro-democracy leader in the erstwhile Kingdom of Sikkim
- Nirgun Sthapit, democracy fighter and martyr during the 1990 People's Movement
- Nhuchhe Ratna Tuladhar, democracy activist and martyr
- Dharma Ratna Yami, freedom fighter and social reformer

=== Historians and scholars ===
- Satya Mohan Joshi, scholar of history and culture
- Gautama V. Vajracharya, Sanskrit scholar and historian
- Kamal P. Malla, Classical Newar scholar and historian
- Kumar Pradhan, historian

=== Actors and actresses ===
- Madan Krishna Shrestha, actor
- Shree Krishna Shrestha, actor
- Ayushman Joshi, actor
- Shiv Shrestha, actor
- Namrata Shrestha, actress
- Ashishma Nakarmi, actress
- Aashirman DS Joshi, actor

=== Singers and musicians ===
- Narayan Gopal, singer, also known as Swar Samrat
- Tara Devi, singer, also known as Swar Samragi
- Prem Dhoj Pradhan, singer
- Seturam Shrestha, singer
- Phatteman Rajbhandari, singer
- Sajjan Raj Vaidya, singer
- Sushma Shrestha, Bollywood film playback singer
- Adrian Pradhan, vocalist and drummer of 1974 AD
- Tara Bir Singh Tuladhar, artist and music composer

=== Beauty pageants ===
- Jharana Bajracharya – Miss Nepal 1997
- Usha Khadgi – Miss Nepal 2000
- Payal Shakya – Miss Nepal 2004
- Sahana Bajracharya – Miss Nepal Earth 2010
- Malina Joshi – Miss Nepal World 2011
- Sarina Maskey – Miss Nepal International 2011
- Shristi Shrestha – Miss Nepal World 2012 and Miss World 2012 Top 20 finalist
- Ishani Shrestha – Miss Nepal World 2013 and Miss World 2013 Top 10 finalist
- Prinsha Shrestha – Miss Nepal Earth 2014
- Sonie Rajbhandari – Miss Nepal International 2014
- Evana Manandhar – Miss Nepal 2015
- Asmi Shrestha – Miss Nepal 2016
- Ronali Amatya – Miss Nepal International 2018
- Anushka Shrestha – Miss Nepal World 2019 and Miss World 2019
- Priyanka Rani Joshi – Miss Nepal 2022
- Srichchha Pradhan – Miss Nepal 2023

=== Writers ===
- Nisthananda Bajracharya, poet and one of the Four Pillars of Nepal Bhasa
- Siddhidas Amatya, poet and one of the Four Pillars of Nepal Bhasa
- Jagat Sundar Malla, poet and one of the Four Pillars of Nepal Bhasa
- Yogbir Singh Kansakar, poet and one of the Four Pillars of Nepal Bhasa
- Chittadhar Hridaya, prominent poet, also known as Kavi Keshari or Chittadhar Tuladhar
- Moti Laxmi Upasika, poet and first short story writer
- Siddhicharan Shrestha, poet, also known as Yug Kavi
- Prem Bahadur Kansakar, writer and founder of Asa Archives
- Durga Lal Shrestha, the People's Poet of Nepal Bhasa and Nepali
- Lupau Ratna Tuladhar, pioneer of Nepalese public transport and writer
- Girija Prasad Joshi, poet
- Kedar Man Vyathit, poet

=== Religious figures ===
- Dhammalok Mahasthavir, worked to revive Nepali Theravada Buddhism
- Dharmachari Guruma, founder of the first nunnery in Nepal
- Pragyananda Mahasthavir, first patriarch of the Theravada Order in Nepal
- Aniruddha Mahathera, patriarch of the Theravada Order
- Ganga Prasad Pradhan, first ordained Nepali Christian pastor and main translator of the Nepali Bible

=== Philanthropists ===
- Sankhadhar Sakhwa, philanthropist, related to Nepal Sambat
- Bhaju Ratna Kansakar, prominent trader and philanthropist
- Pushpa Sundar Tuladhar, prominent merchant and philanthropist
- Daya Bir Singh Kansakar, social worker and founder of Paropakar Organization
- Tara Devi Tuladhar, social worker and Nepal’s first female blood donor
- Karna Shakya, environmentalist, conservationist, hotel entrepreneur, writer, and philanthropist

=== Merchants and businesspeople ===
- Ambica Shrestha, owner, Dwarika's Hotel
- Triratna Man Tuladhar, president of the Nepalese Chamber of Commerce
- Karuna Ratna Tuladhar, pioneer of Nepalese public transport and proprietor of Nepal Transport Service
- Bhakta Bir Singh Tuladhar, merchant and sponsor of Samyak festival
- Pratek Man Tuladhar, trader and philatelist
- Purna Kaji Tamrakar, trader and author

=== Athletes ===
- Baikuntha Manandhar, runner who competed at four consecutive Olympic Games
- Gyanendra Malla, cricketer
- Asmina Karmacharya, cricketer
- Nawayug Shrestha, football player
- Sanju Pradhan, football player
- Ashish Pradhan, football player

=== Artists ===
- Prem Man Chitrakar, artist and poet
- Sujan Chitrakar, artist, academic and assistant professor at Kathmandu University

=== Architects and engineers ===
- Jogbir Sthapit, architect and designer of Narayanhiti Royal Palace, Swayambhunath and Kindo Baha
- Kul Ratna Tuladhar, first chief engineer of Nepal's Public Works Department

=== Publishers and printers ===
- Mandas Tuladhar, pioneer publisher and collector of ancient hymns
- Pushpa Ratna Sagar, grammarian, lexicographer and pioneer pressman

=== Healthcare professionals ===
- Ashapatti Tamrakar, pioneer optician and herbalist
- Vidyabati Kansakar, pioneer nurse and recipient of the Order of Gorkha Dakshina Bahu

=== Film professionals ===
- Binod Pradhan, cinematographer

=== Journalists ===
- Nitesh R Pradhan, journalist and singer

== Gallery ==
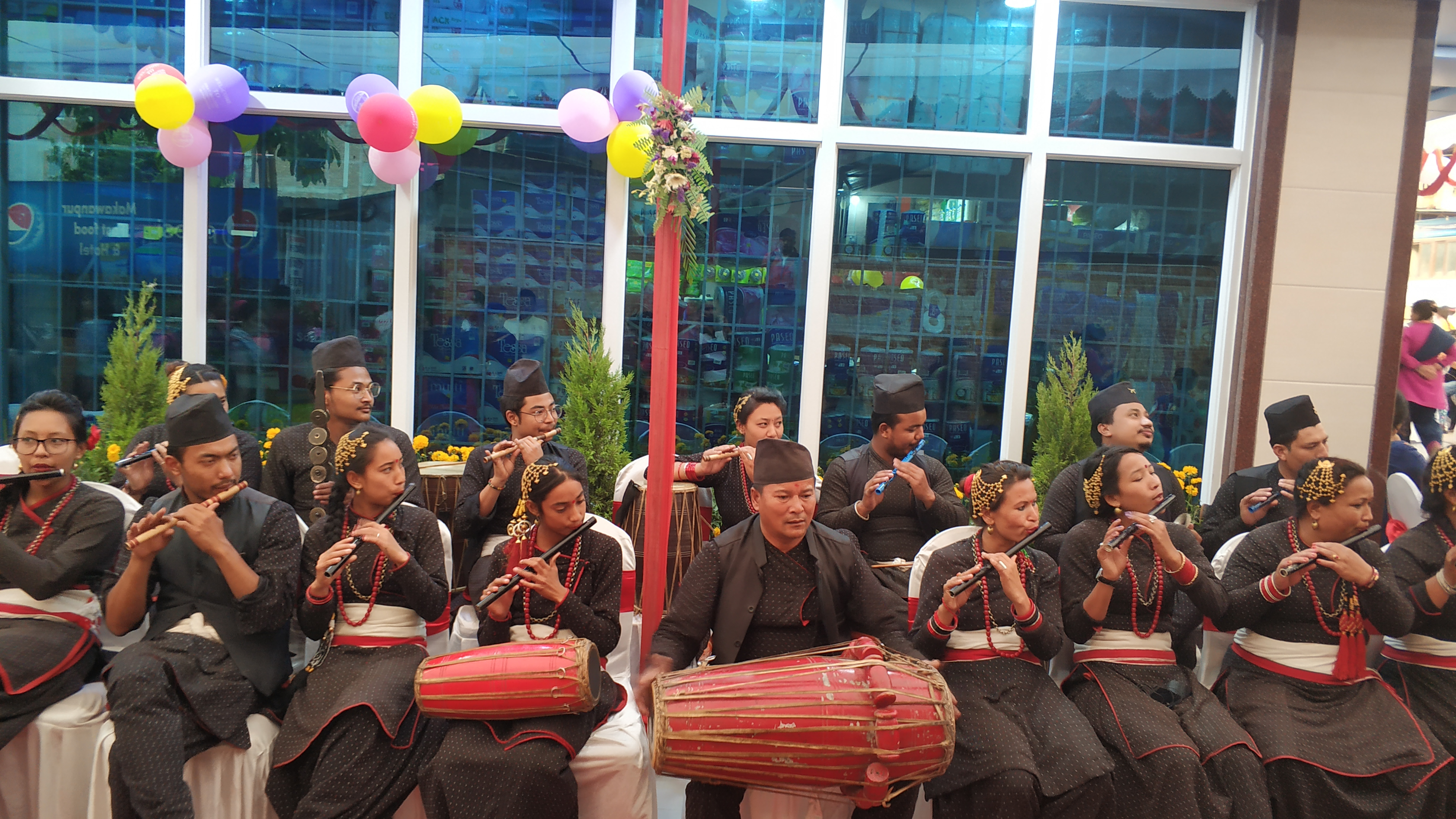
Newar people playing musical instruments

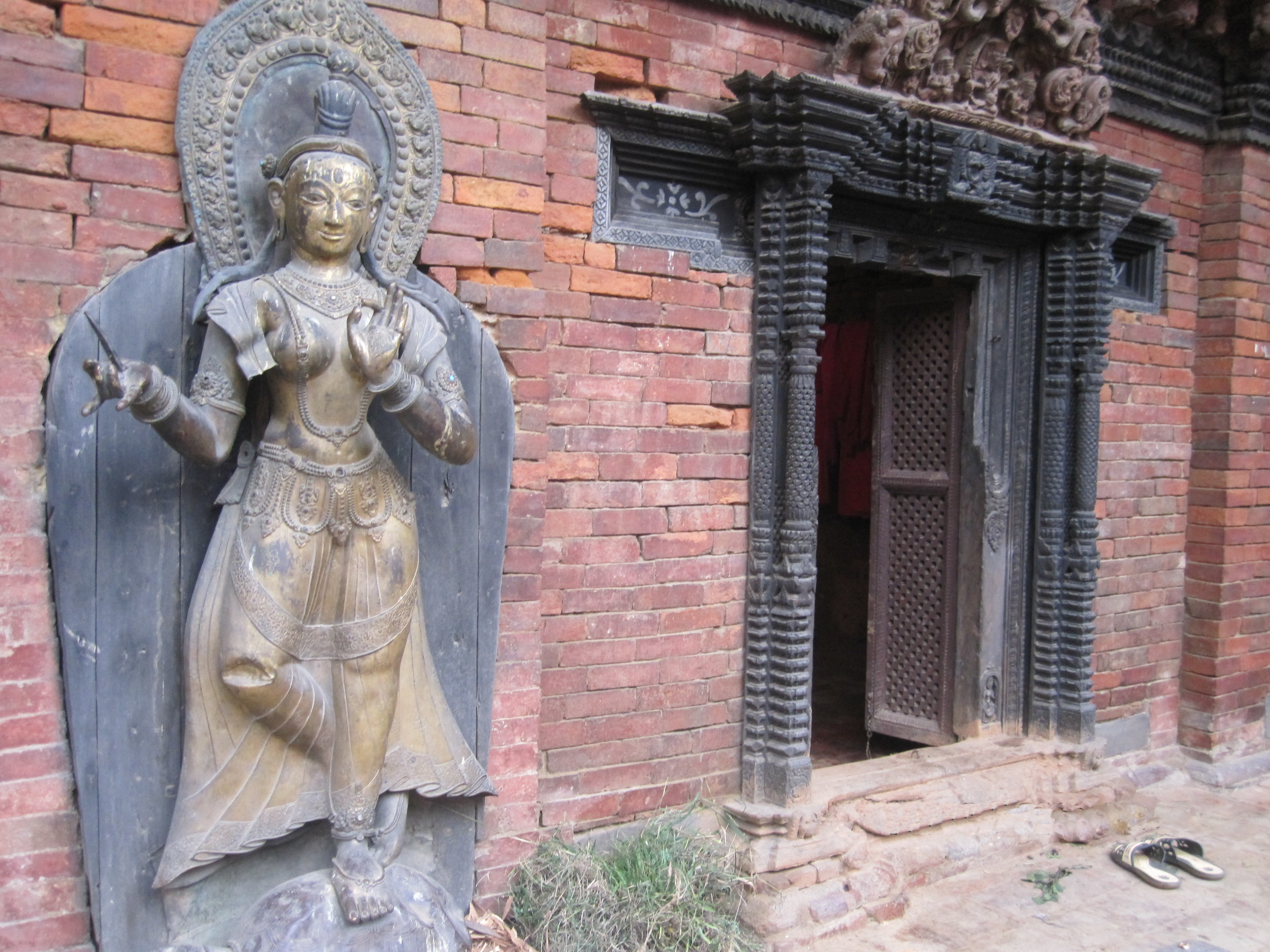
Statue in Lalitpur

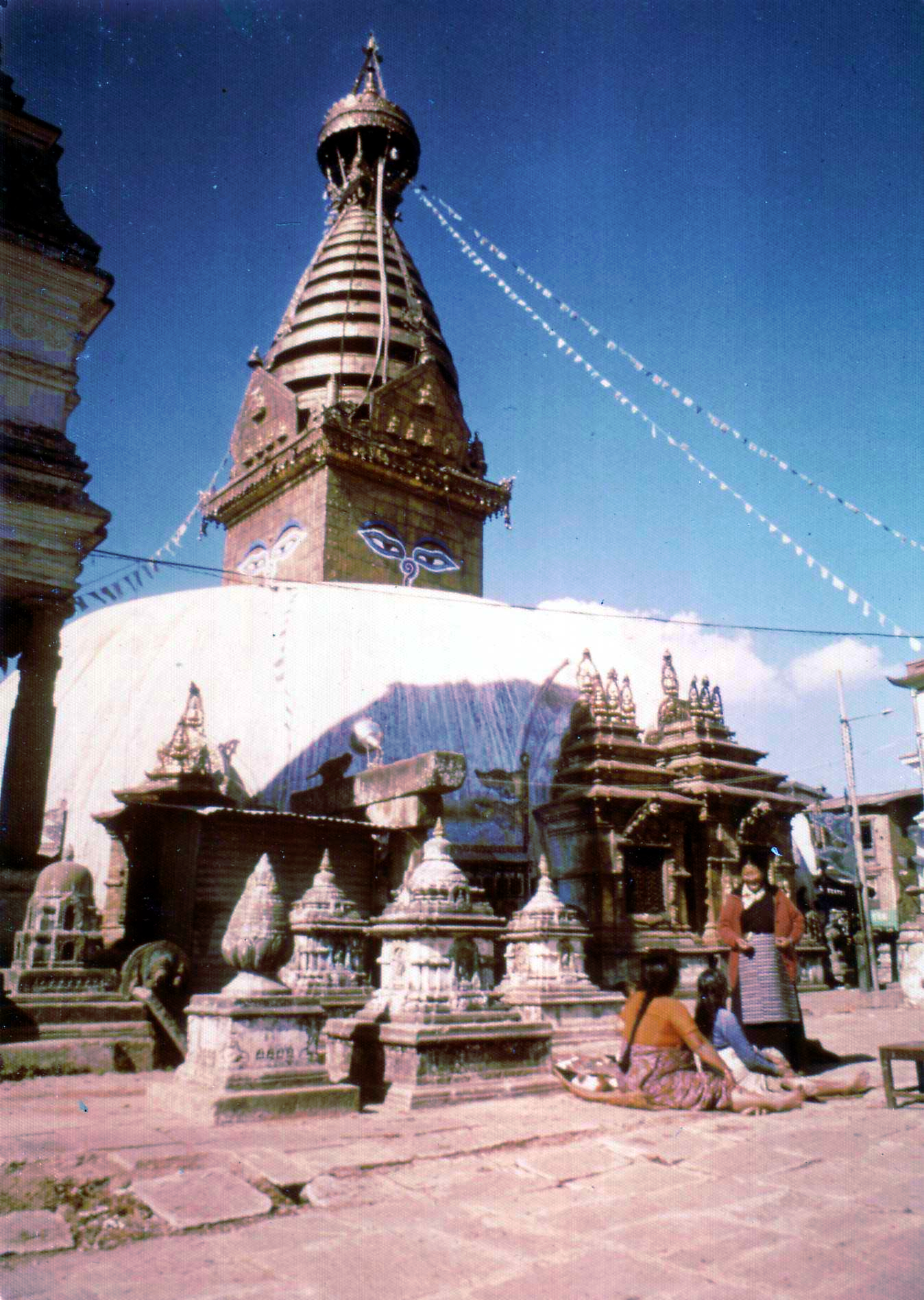
Swayambhunath in Dallu, Kathmandu

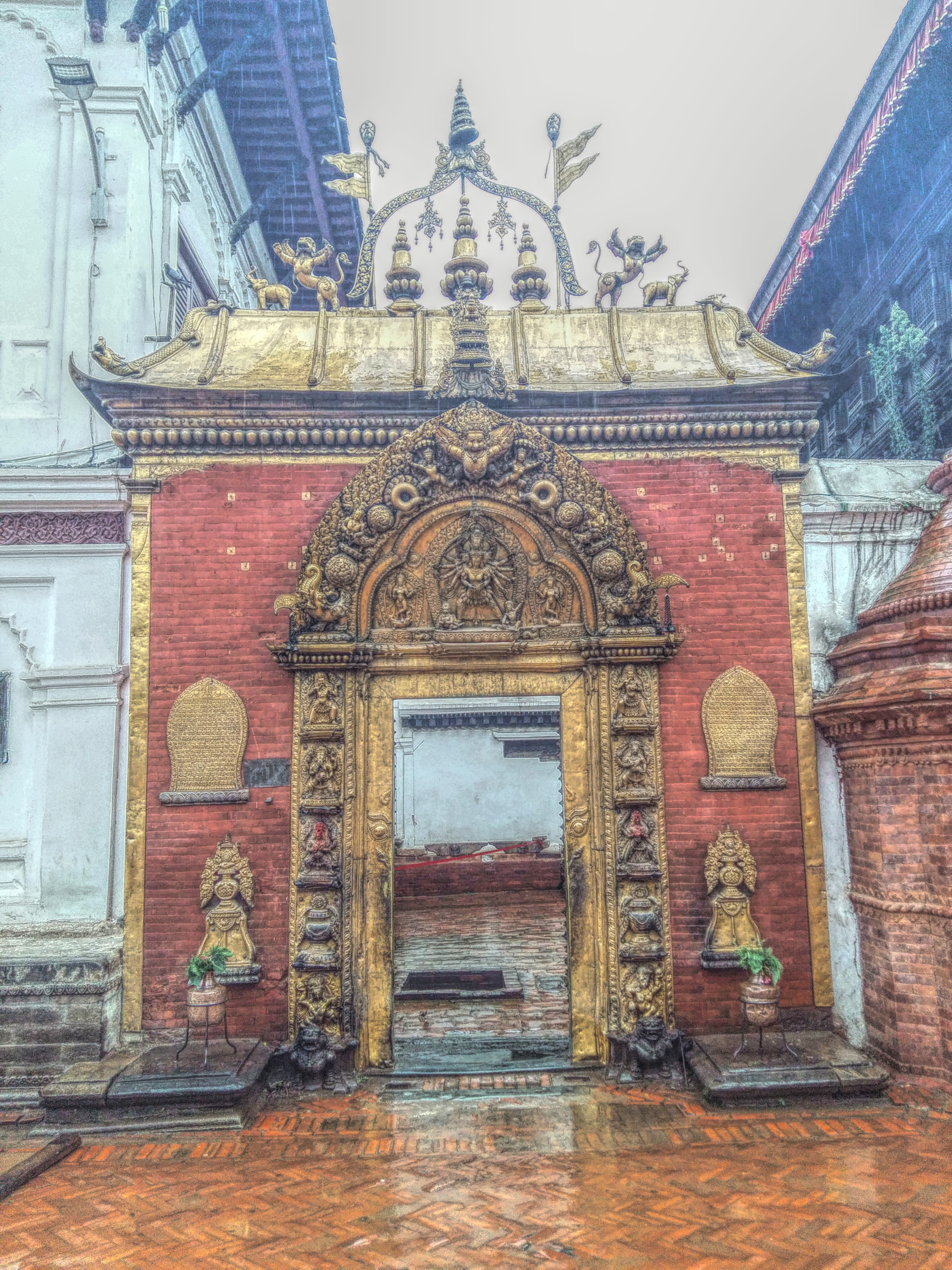
The world-famous Golden Gate of Bhaktapur, also known as Guheshwor Mandir

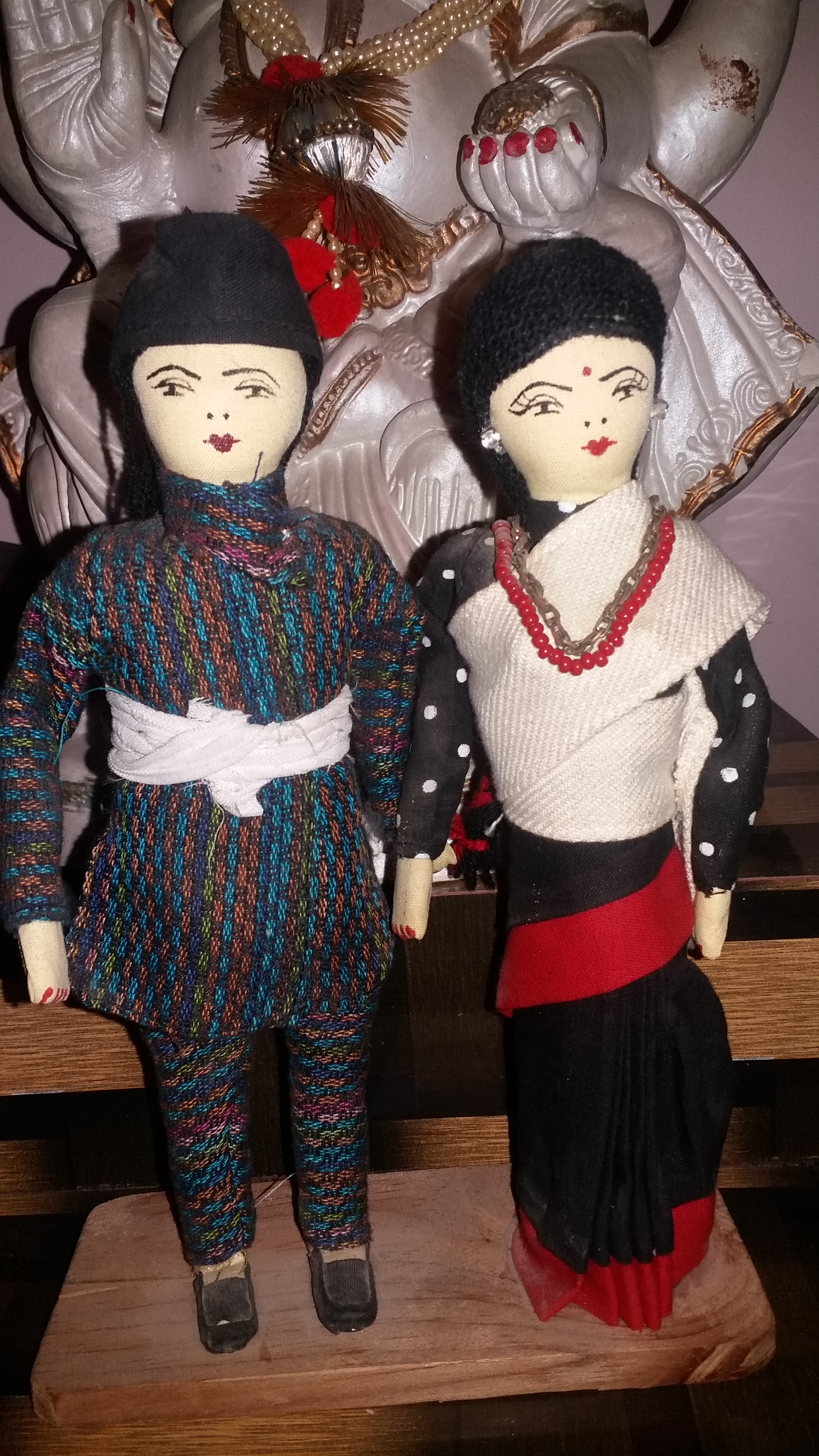
Toys on Newari dress (Hakupatashi)

== See also ==
- Lhasa Newar (trans-Himalayan traders)
- Taksari Newars
- Newa Rastriya Mukti Morcha, Nepal
- Nepal Bhasa movement
- Classical Newar
