= Bahra ceremony =

Coming of age ritual in Newar community of Nepal

Bahra tayegu or bahra chuyegu (Nepal Bhasa: बराह तयेगु or बराह चुयेगु ) is a rite of passage in the Newar community of Nepal, involving girls aged 7 to 13 practicing self-discipline for 12 days. Throughout this period, women within the community impart knowledge about womanhood and its various challenges to the young participant. Contrary to the misconception that a girl is wedded to the sun god in a marriage ceremony, it is important to clarify that this is inaccurate. Instead, the ritual is more focused on the practice of self-discipline. In Nepalbhasa, the term "bahra" originates from the word "Bareyagu," which translates to restraining oneself or practicing self-discipline. During this ritual, adolescent girls undergo a 12-day period of seclusion in a dark room. There is a common misconception where the term "gufa" is inaccurately used to describe "Baarhaa." In a softly lit room, shielded from sunlight and devoid of any male contact, the crash course commences. Its purpose is to equip a young girl for the transition to a new phase where she must conduct herself as women. These preparations constitute a crucial process, ensuring she is ready to navigate the world beyond her parents' home when she embarks on living with her spouse's family. The final day is marked with a bhwe (a traditional party) and celebrations.

== Description ==
The ceremony is conducted before the menarche- generally at the age of 5, 7, 9, 11 or 13 years old. When the girl is chosen for the ceremony the priest is consulted for a suitable date and place for ceremony. The first day of the ceremony starts with a usual puja conducted either by the eldest woman of the lineage or the priest. The ritual food, Samaybaji which consists of 9 dishes is offered to the sun god. Then the seclusion starts. A doll representing the bahra Khayak, the cave ghost, is prepared and put at one corner of the room. It is believed that for the 12 days the girl is possessed in some way by the bahra khayak and thus as homage the girl regularly conducts puja to the khayak. For the first 5 days she is not allowed to clean herself or eat salted food. After the 6th day her female relatives come to visit her with a variety of delicacies. Also from this day onward the girl has to put on a special face mask called Kghwao (made of rice flour, roasted fenugreek flour, sandalwood and other herbs) to make her beautiful.

On the 12th day the girl wakes up before the sunrise to take a full bath. Then she is dressed up in traditional wedding dress with red sari and heavy gold jewelry as if it were an actual wedding. Concluding with an intricate ritual, the priest formally welcomes her back to the world, starting the ceremony by gazing at the sun. This is the origin of the misconception regarding a sun wedding. The girl is veiled all the time during the ceremony and at the end she lifts her veil and looks at the reflection of the sun on water. The completion of the 12 day ceremony is celebrated with a traditional party. If the girl were to die during this 12 day ritual, the tradition has it that the body should not see the sun. Thus, the body is to be buried underground the same house the girl dies.

== Significance ==
Bahra ceremony marks the change from a girl to a fertile woman. In the Newar community the girls are married twice only: first to the god Suvarna Kumar which is a symbol of the god Vishnu, finally to a human.

== See also ==
- Ihi
- Nepal Bhasa
- Newar
