= Newar Hinduism =

Form of Hinduism practiced by the Newar people of the Kathmandu Valley, Nepal

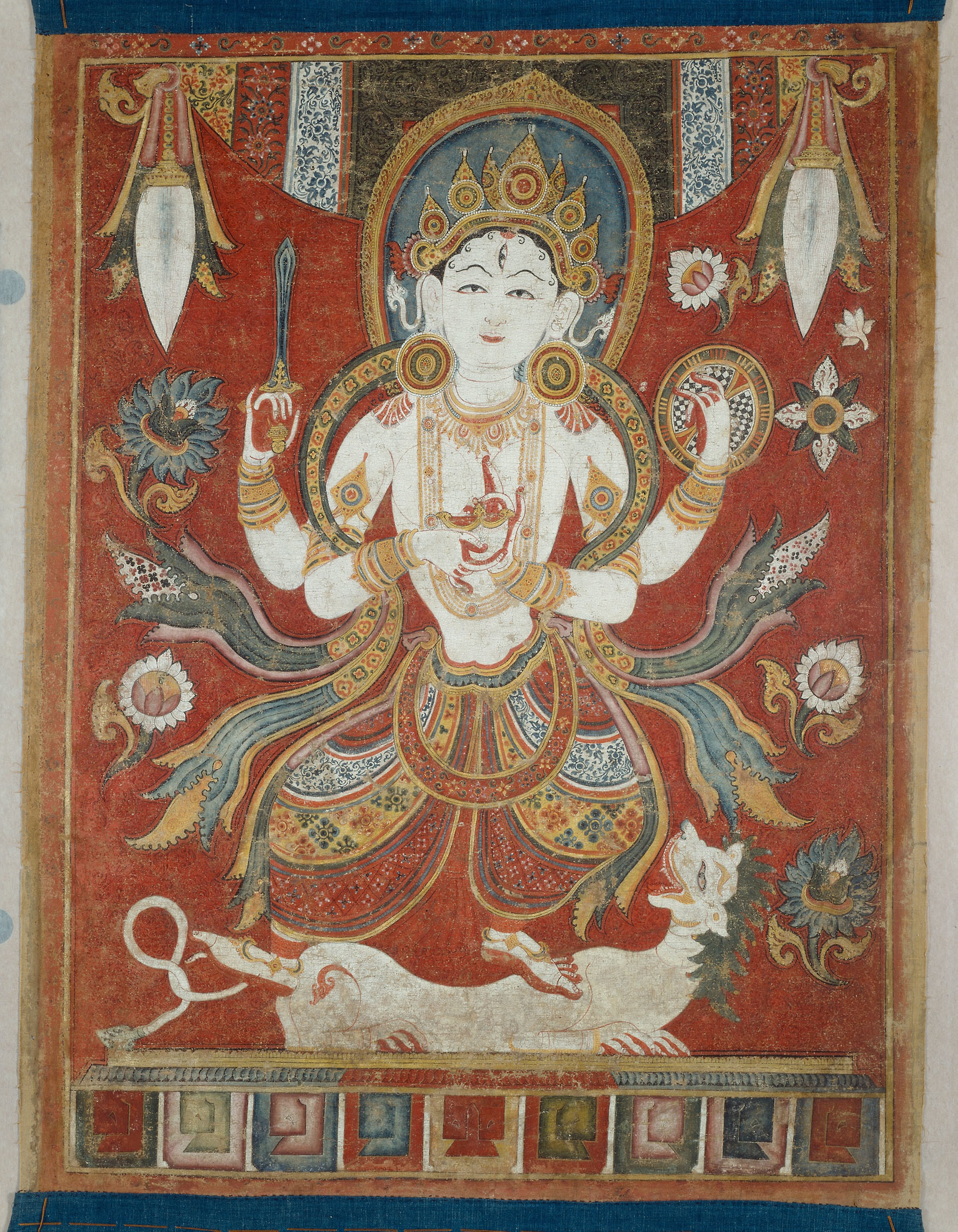
A 17th century festival banner depicting the Goddess Mahalakshmi.

Newar Hinduism is a form of Hinduism followed by the Newar people in Nepal. Newar Hinduism is based on the concept of Kaula or Vamachara.

== Dance ==
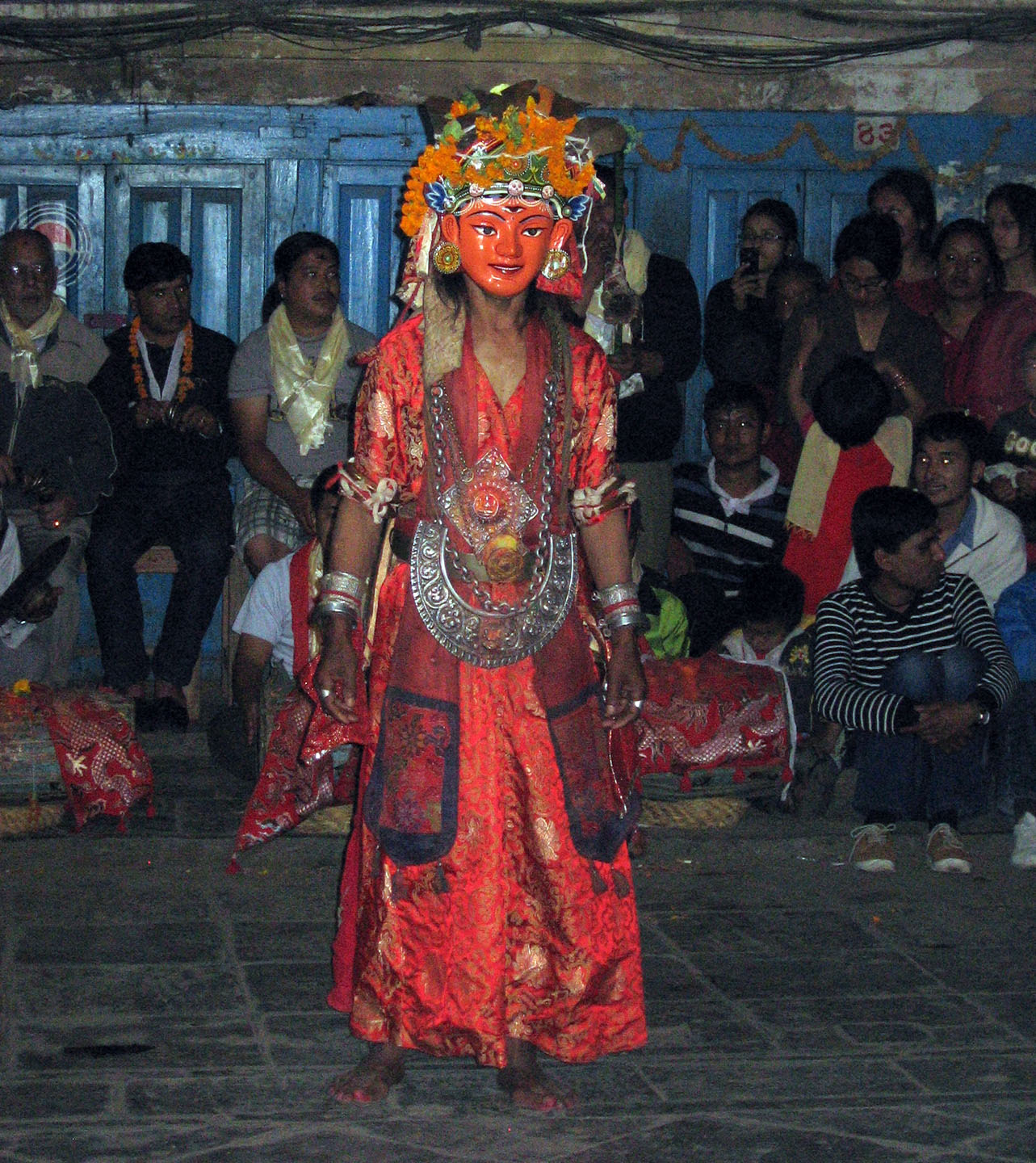
The Nyetamaru Ajima masked dance is performed at Nyeta in Kathmandu in April.

Newar dance consists of sacred masked dance, religious dance without the use of masks known as Dyah Pyakhan, a dance performed as part of a ritual and meditation practice known as Chachaa Pyakhan (Newar: चचा प्याखं) (Charya Nritya in Sanskrit) and folk dance. There are also masked dance dramas known as Daboo Pyakhan which enact religious stories to the accompaniment of music. Masked dances are performed on stone dance platforms that exist at all major city squares. They are the highlight of religious festivals. Most dances are held annually while certain dances are performed once every 12 years. The performances are organized by dance societies in which membership is hereditary. The history of these traditional dances goes back centuries.

== Festivals and events ==
Newa Hinduism and Newar Buddhism share festivals with each other.

=== Kachhala (कछला) ===
- Sakimana Punhi (सकिमना पुन्हि):

This day people go to Swyambhu and Chobhar for worshiping.

- Sankhadhar Sakhwaa Budin (शंखधर साख्वा बुदिं):

This day is the birthday of Sankhadhar Sakhwa who was the founder of Nepal Sambat.

- Bala Chahre (बाला चह्रे)

This day people especially Kapali people worship Shiva.

=== Thinlaa (थिंला) ===
- Yamari Punhi (यःमरि पुन्हि)

This day people eat Yomari. Especially Jyapu people they worship their communistic god. This day is also referred as Jyapu divas.

- Disi Chahre (दिसि चह्रे)

This day is a main day of Bari people for performing Puja.

=== Pohela (पोहेला) ===
- Asthami-thwa (अष्टमि-थ्व):

The term "Asthami-thwa" means the 8th day of the month or even the 8th day of the sub-month before the full moon. This day Seto Machindranath is worshiped.

- Milaa Punhi (मिला पुन्हि):

This is the starting day of the Hindu religious story "Swasthani"

- Ghya-chaku Sanlu (घ्यःचाकु संल्हु):

This day is one of the festivals celebrated by Solar calendar. Though it lies on Pohela(पोहेला) month of Nepal Sambat its accurate date is 1st Magh of Bikram Sambat. This day is also known as Maghe Sankranti.
