= Panga, Kirtipur =

Coordinates: 27°40′N 85°17′E

Panga पाँगा
- Municipality
- Interactive map of Panga
- Country: Nepal
- Province: Bagmati Province
- District: Kathmandu District

Population (1991)
  - Total: 4,538
- Time zone: UTC+5:45 (Nepal Time)

Panga (Nepali: पाँगा) is a typical Newari settlement and part of Kirtipur Municipality. Kirtipur is one of the five municipalities in the valley i.e.; Kirtipur Municipality, the others being Kathmandu, Lalitpur, Bhaktapur and Madhyapur Thimi. It is the small city next to the Chobar Hill.

== Etymology ==
The name Panga comes from Pa (to guard) and Gä (Village or city). Later on changed to "Panga".

== Demographics ==
Originally a Newar foundation, Panga is still a center of Newar culture. It has been merged with surrounding villages to form the municipality of Kirtipur with a population of 65,602.

It consists of many temples, Vihars (Buddhist monastery) and churches too. Due to the presence of Tribhuvan University in Kirtipur, Kirtipur is also a popular area for out-of-town students and professors to rent houses, and they are major contributors to the local economy.

== Media ==
To promote local culture, Kirtipur Area has popular Facebook page named Panga Kirtipur where people can get all the updates of events happened before and happening. There are several weekly newspapers published from Kirtipur. They are Shahid, Kirtipur Sandesh and Swornim Sandesh. Also there is a local television station, Kirtipur Channel.
