= Ambica Shrestha =

Nepalese entrepreneur (1933–2024)

- अम्बिका श्रेष्ठ
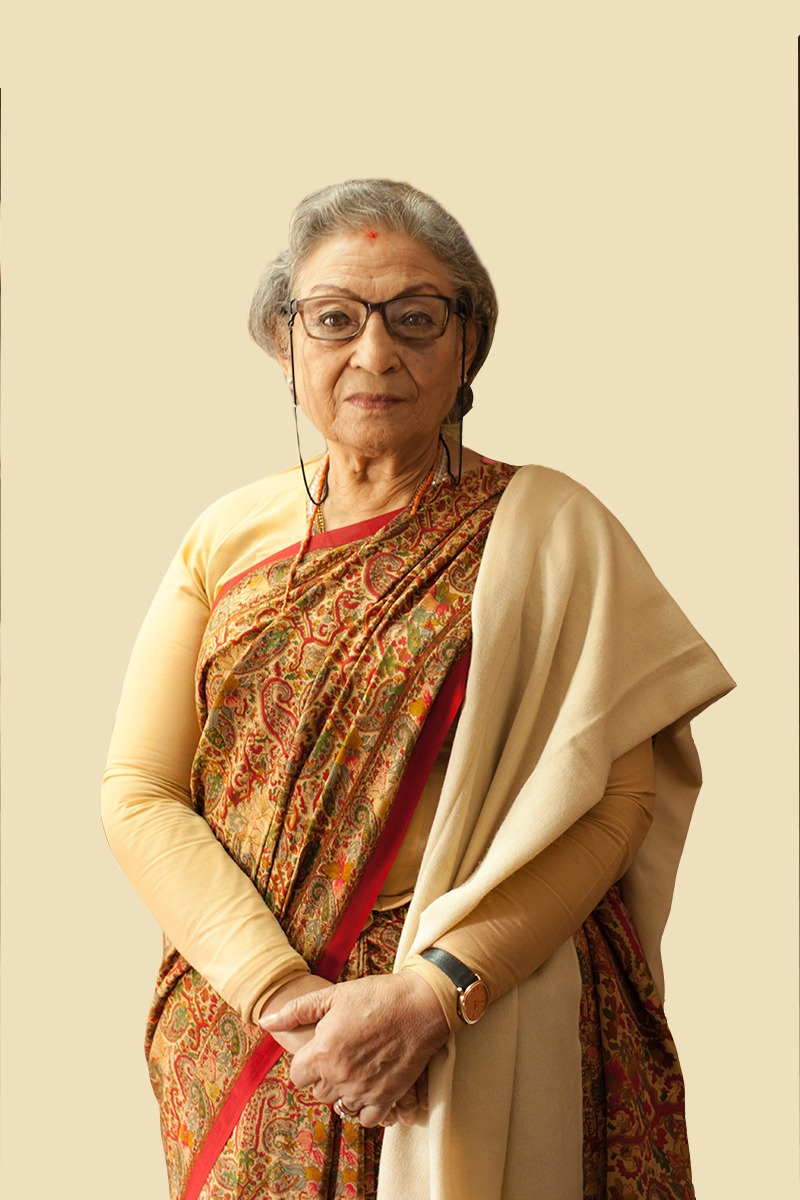
- Born: 12 February 1933; Darjeeling, India
- Died: 18 July 2024 (aged 91); Lalitpur, Nepal
- Occupations: Hotelier, entrepreneur
- Partner: Dwarikdas Shrestha
- Parents: Khadga Bahadur Pradhan (father); Padhma Kesari (mother)

Ambica Shrestha (12 February 1933 – 18 July 2024) was a Nepalese hotelier and a figure in the preservation of Nepalese cultural heritage. She served as the president of Dwarika's Hotels and Resorts until her death.

(Photo by Priti Thapa)

== Early life ==
Shrestha was born on 12 February 1933 in Darjeeling, British India, she received her secondary education at St. Joseph School. After marrying Dwarika Das Shrestha, an artist, she moved to Nepal.

== Career ==
Shrestha established the Dwarika's Hotel, a high-end heritage hotel known for its collection of antique art and dedication to preserving traditional Nepali architecture and culture. Construction of the hotel started in 1964 and was completed in 1977. Following her husband's death in 1991, Ambica took on the role of managing the hotel, continuing to build its reputation and expand its offerings.

In addition to her work in the hospitality industry, Ambica Shrestha was the Honorary Consulate General of Spain for Nepal. She also led the Nepalese Heritage Society and Business and Professional Women Nepal, where she focused on preserving Nepal's cultural heritage and advocating for the welfare of underprivileged women.

Shrestha was the first Nepali woman to secure bank loans for women entrepreneurs, advocating for financial independence from husbands and families.

== Personal life ==
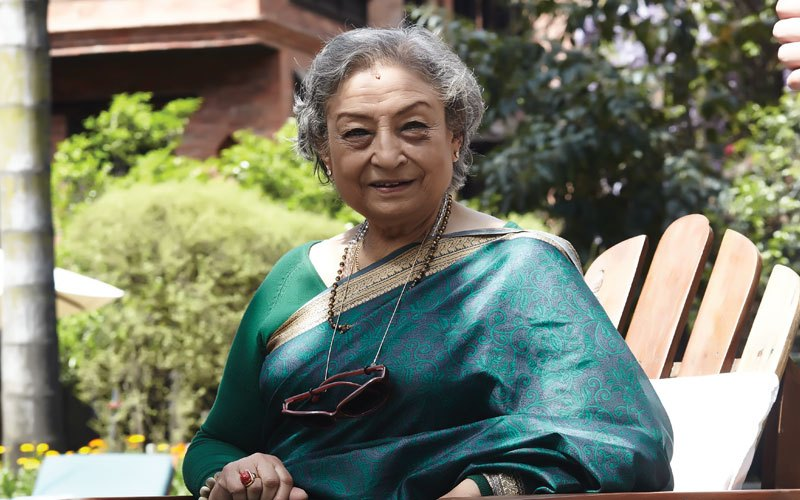
Ambica Shrestha

Shrestha was married to Dwarika Das Shrestha, an artist. The couple had two daughters.

Shrestha died on 18 July 2024 at a hospital in Lalitpur. She was 91, and had pneumonia and rheumatism at the time of her death.

== Honors ==
- Gorkha Dakshin Bahu 4th by His Majesty the King of Nepal
- Prakhyat Trishaktti Pattaby by His Majesty the King of Nepal
- Badge of Honour by BPW International
- Decoration of the Cruz de Official De la Orden De Isabel La Catolica by His Majesty King Juan Carlos I of Spain
- Service Above Self Award by Rotary Club International
