= Ashapatti Tamrakar =

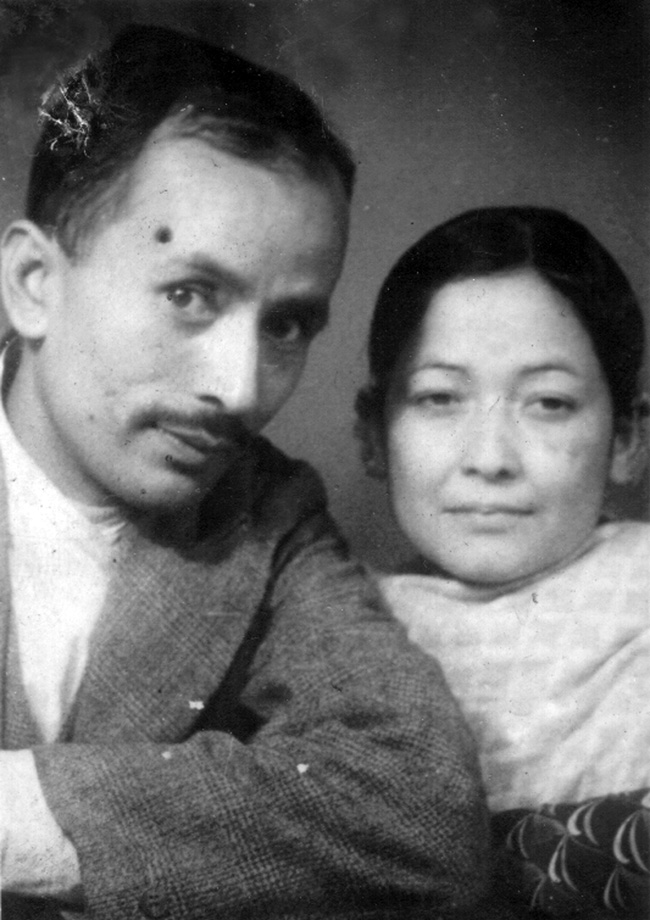
- Tamrakar with wife Moti Lani in 1930
- Occupation(s): Optician, herbalist, compounder
- Spouse: Moti Lani Tuladhar

Signature
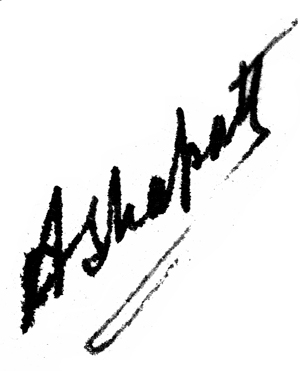

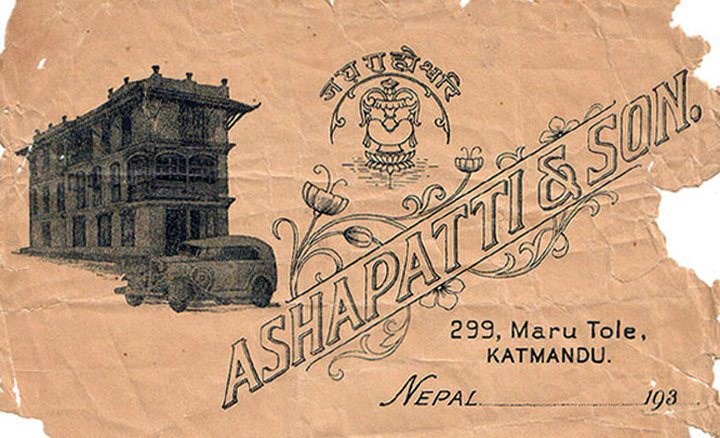
Letterhead of the firm Ashapatti & Son in the 1930s.

Ashapatti Tamrakar (Nepali: आशापति ताम्रकार) (1904–1942) was a pioneer optician of Nepal. He imported and dispensed spectacles, and was trained in ophthalmology and orthoposcopy when such specialists were practically unheard of in Nepal.

== Early life ==
Tamrakar was born in Maru, Kathmandu Durbar Square to father Pranpati and mother Hera Laxmi. His father was a herbalist, and he trained under him and joined the family business of dispensing herbal medicines. The Tamrakars had given up their ancestral occupation generations ago. Many of Tamrakar's relatives were artisans and practiced their hereditary occupation of making household utensils of copper and lamps and other ritual objects of silver, according to the division of labor laid down in ancient times.

Tamrakar's first wife died leaving him a son Rampati. In 1927, he got married a second time to Moti Lani Tuladhar who bore him a daughter Hira Shobha.

== Medical practice ==
Tamrakar's firm Ashapatti & Son, which was based in his home, imported spectacles from India. Subsequently, he imported an edging machine and also made reading glasses. In 1935, he travelled to Kolkata and enrolled at United Optical Service at 54 Bowbazar Street to receive training in ophthalmology and orthoposcopy.

Besides being an optician, Tamrakar was engaged as a herbalist and compounder. In 1939, he went to Kolkata and served briefly as a dresser in the wards and operation theater of Campbell Medical School and Hospital, which has since been renamed Nil Ratan Sircar Medical College and Hospital. He also worked as an anesthetist at Bir Hospital in Kathmandu.

== Forward-minded ==
Tamrakar was a firm believer in female education, an idea which was frowned upon during his time. He insisted on his daughter going to school and enrolled her at Kanya Pathshala at Durbar Square, one of the very few in existence in the country. This was a school for girls run by Chandra Kanta Joshi, sister of martyr Shukra Raj Shastri.

Tamrakar contracted tuberculosis in his later years for which treatment was not available in Nepal in those days. He died at his home in 1942 at the age of 38.
