= Dwarika's Hotel =

Building in Kathmandu, Nepal

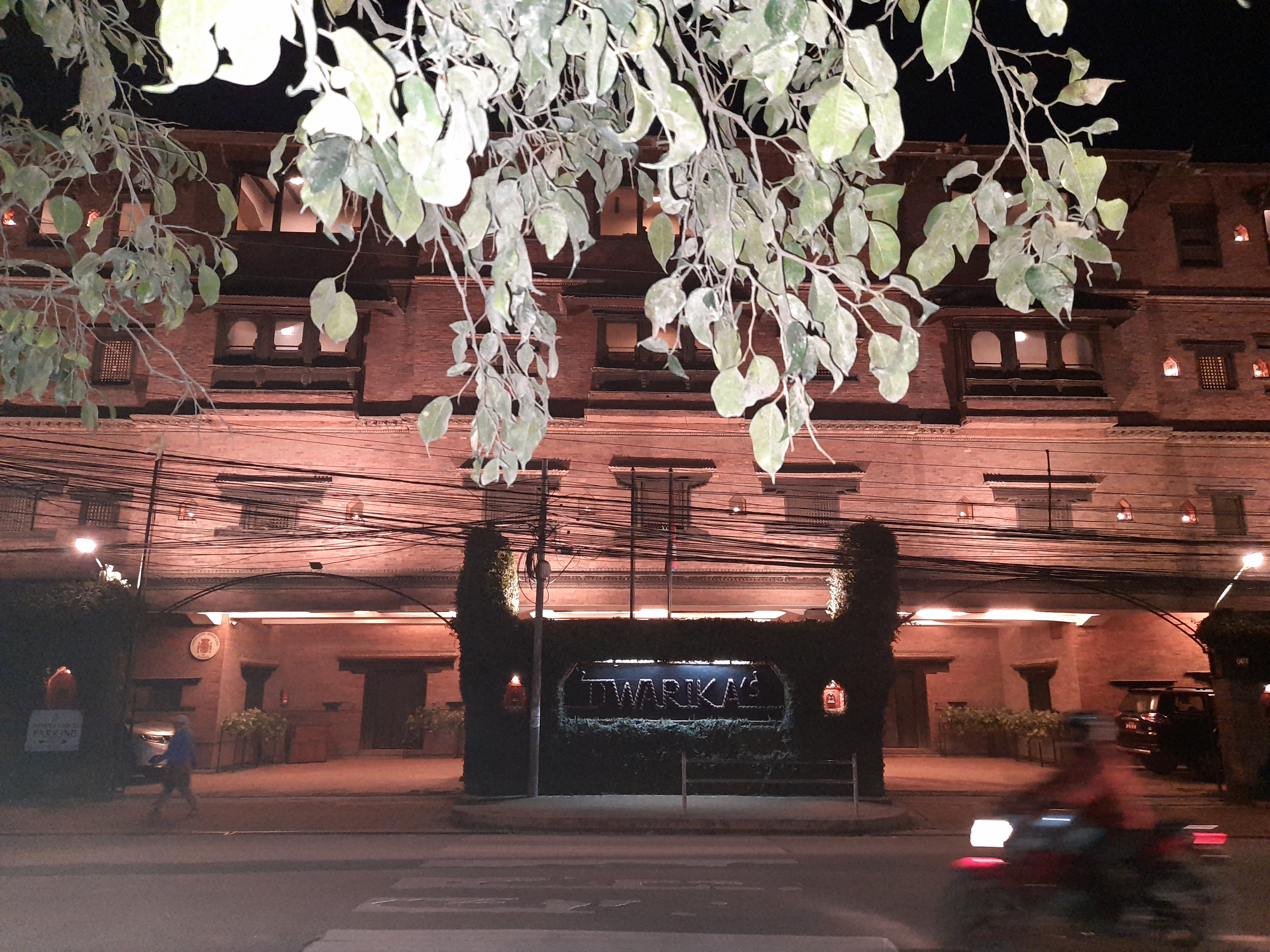
- Dwarika's Hotel, Kathmandu.

- Location within Nepal

General information
- Location: Kathmandu, Nepal
- Coordinates: 27°42′17″N 85°20′34″E

Other information
- Number of rooms: 80
- Number of suites: 48

Website
- www.dwarikas.com

Dwarika's Hotel is a luxury hotel in Kathmandu, Nepal, located in the Battisputali neighborhood. The hotel is a collection of traditional heritage Newari houses centered around courtyards. It has over 80 rooms and 48 suites, and took over 30 years to construct. It has been recognized with the UNESCO Asia-Pacific Heritage Award for Culture Heritage Conservation for its commitment to preserving Nepali architectural traditions. It was awarded the PATA (Pacific Asia Travel Association) Heritage Gold Award in 1980.

== History ==
The hotel is known for its cultural preservation efforts. It began when founder Dwarika Das Shrestha decided to save old wood carvings from traditional Kathmandu buildings that were about to be discarded. In 1952, Shrestha saw carpenters cutting up an intricately carved wooden pillar of a demolished old building, to use as firewood.

Shrestha initially placed these carvings in a room housing a single master's student from abroad. The carvings garnered significant interest, leading Shrestha to conceive the idea of constructing guest rooms with traditional wood carvings, thus starting the hotel venture. He also revived the "Dacchiapa" technique, the Newari traditional method of making carved bricks. Shrestha died in 1992. His wife Ambica Shrestha continued the mission thereafter.

The hotel is managed by the Shrestha family and now possesses a large private woodwork collection. The restoration workshop that the late Dwarika Shrestha established to revive wood carvings as early as 1962 is still in operation, although it is now used only for significantly damaged pieces.
