= Ihi =

Ceremony in the Newar community in Nepal

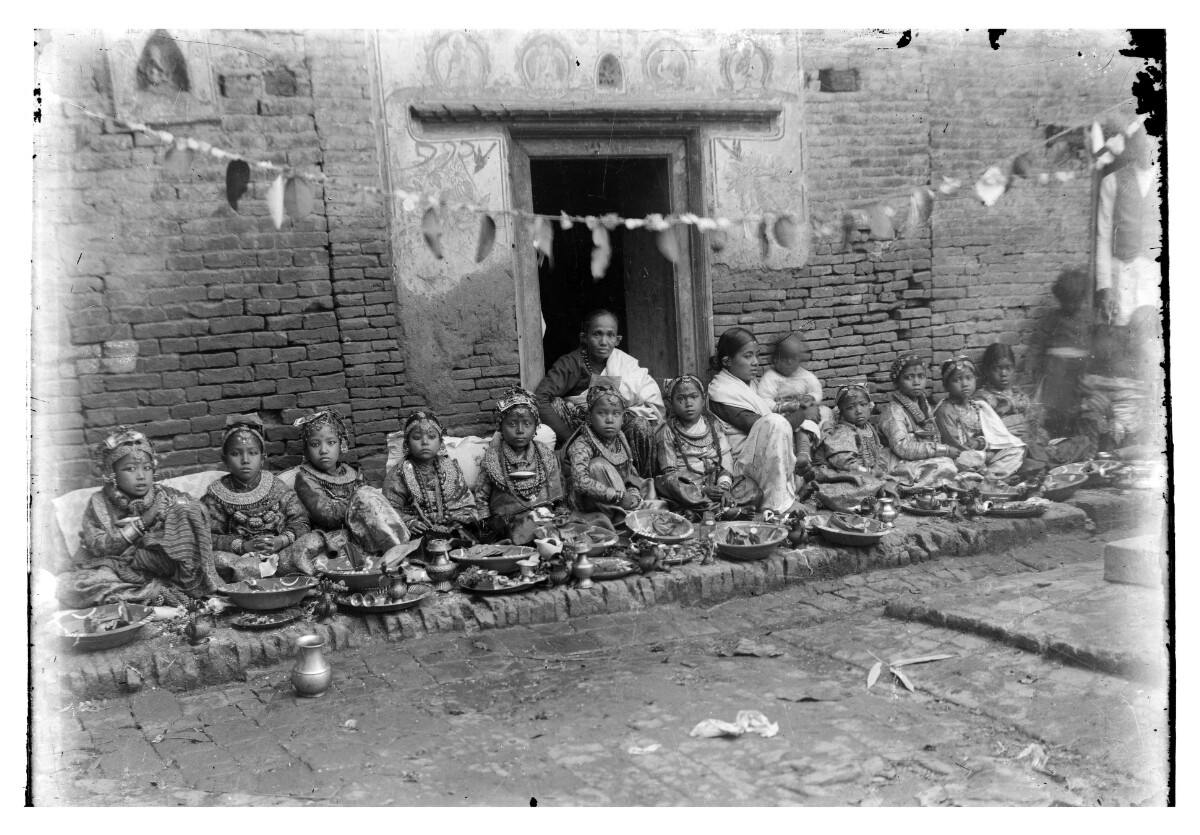
A group of Newar girls performing the Ihi ceremony, early 20th century.

Ihi (Nepal Bhasa: ईही), also spelled as Ehee, is a ceremony performed by the Newar people of Nepal in which age 5,7 or 9 girls are ceremonially "binding" to a symbol of either the Hindu deity Vishnu or the Buddha. It is believed that if the girl's husband dies later in her life, she is not considered a widow because she is married to Vishnu, and so already has a husband that is believed to be still alive. This was basically done to dodge the tradition of 'Sati Pratha', where after the husband dies, the widow sacrifices herself in the burning fire.

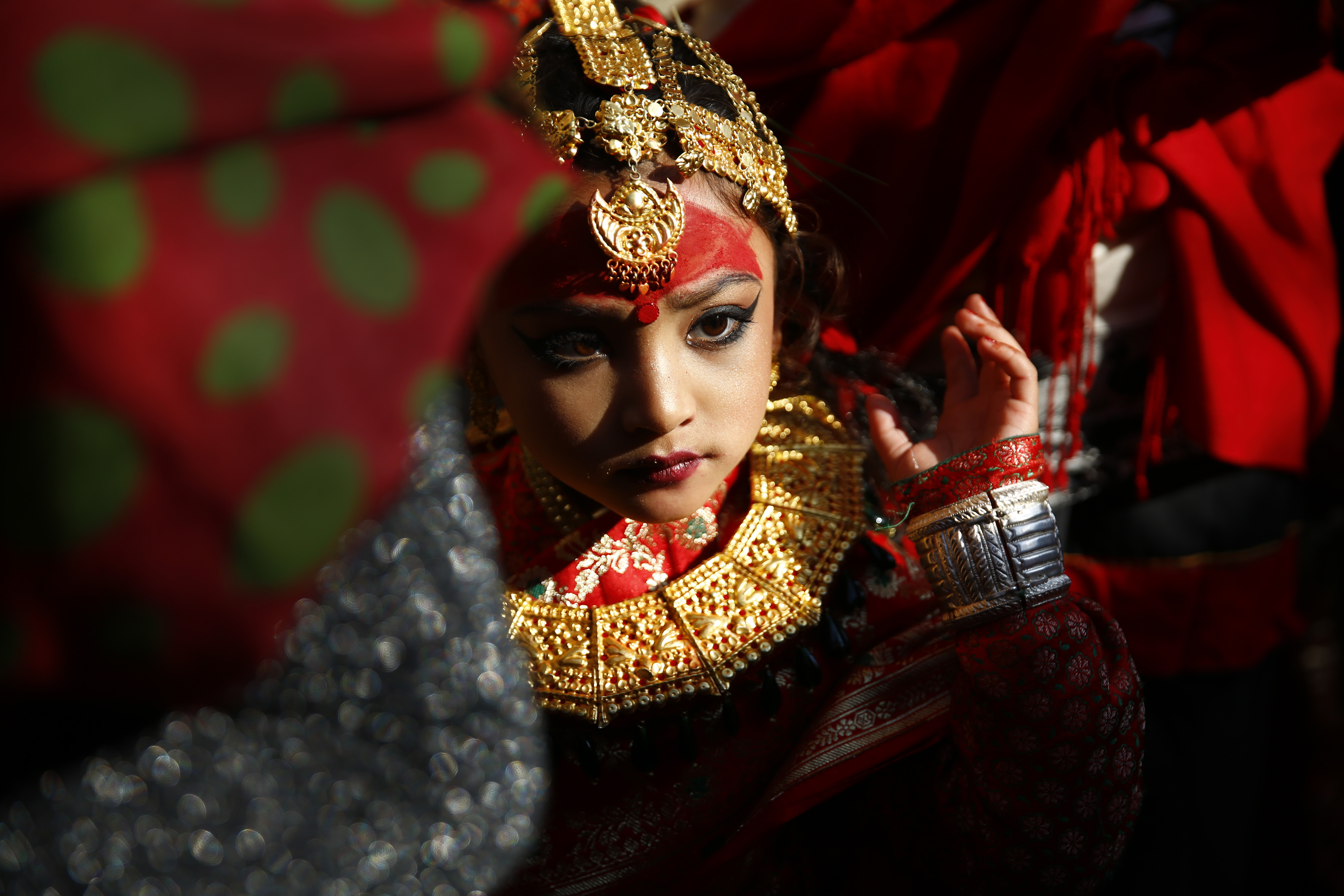
Detail of the jewelry worn by a Newar girl for her Ihi ceremony.

== See also ==
- Kanyadan
- Marriage in Hinduism
