= Nirgun Sthapit =

Nepalese activist

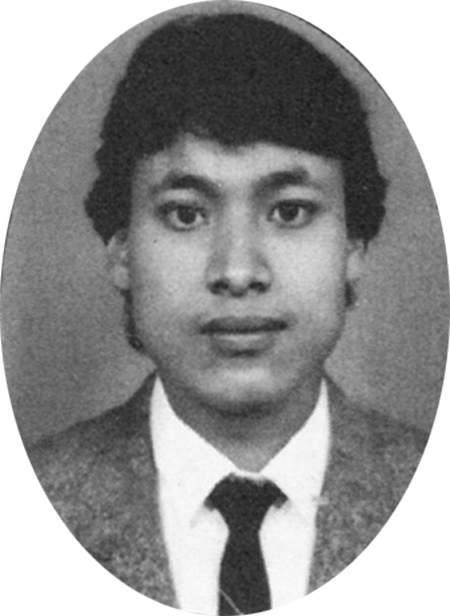
Nirgun Sthapit

Nirgun Sthapit (Nepali: निर्गुण स्थापित) (8 July 1968 – 6 April 1990) was a fighter for democracy who was martyred during the 1990 People's Movement in Nepal. The movement put an end to absolute monarchy and the repressive Panchayat system, and reinstated multiparty democracy in the country.

College freshman Sthapit was shot by security forces during a street demonstration at Bhotahiti, a market street in central Kathmandu. He was rushed to nearby Bir Hospital which was crowded with wounded demonstrators, and died shortly after.

Sthapit was born to father Krishna Das and mother Maiya Sthapit in Kathmandu. He was a student of Intermediate in Commerce at Public Youth Campus, Kathmandu.

The Panchayat system was established by King Mahendra in 1960 after ousting Nepal's first democratically elected government and dissolving Parliament. He suspended the constitution, imprisoned the prime minister and key ministers and banned political parties. A new constitution was promulgated in 1962 that gave the king supreme powers. The Panchayat system pursued a policy promoting one religion, language and values that aroused resentment in Nepal's multicultural society.

== Legacy ==
Sthapit's statues have been installed at a crossroads at Yatkha and at Public Youth Campus, the college where he studied, to commemorate his memory. A street in Yatkha near Kathmandu Durbar Square has been named Sahid Nirgun Marg in his honor.
