= Pratek Man Tuladhar =

Nepalese collector (1924–1991)

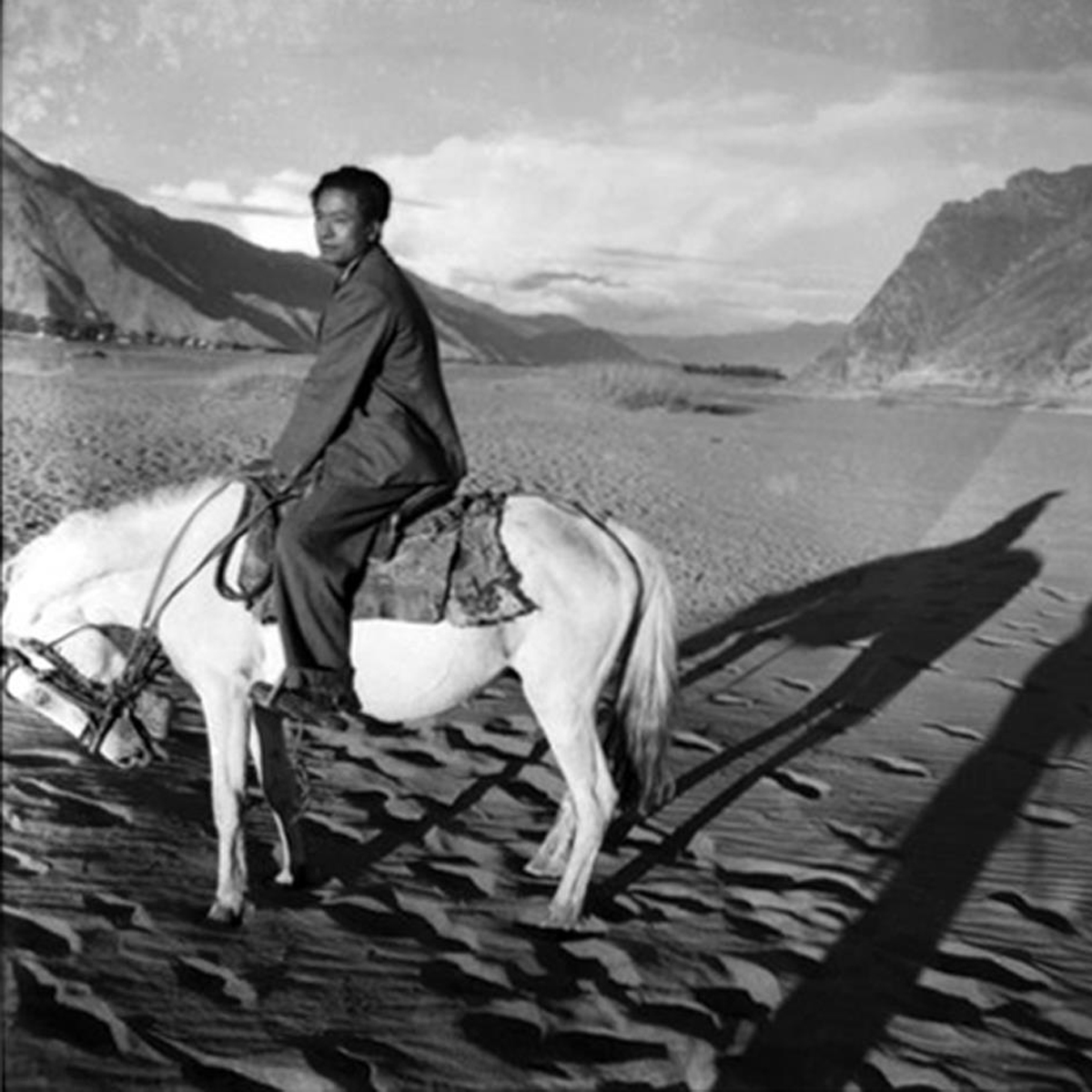
Pratek Man Tuladhar somewhere in Tibet ca. 1940s.

Pratek Man Tuladhar (Nepali: प्रत्येकमान तुलाधर) (1924–1991) was a Nepalese trader and philatelist. Born in Kathmandu into a family of hereditary merchants, he spent his youth in Lhasa, Tibet, where they owned a business house.

During his stay in Tibet (1939–1960), alongside his main occupation of conducting trade between India, Nepal and Tibet, he developed an avid interest in collecting photographs, postage stamps and coins.

Tuladhar also corresponded with penpals around the world. As a rare letter writer from Tibet, his name became renowned worldwide among philatelists. His letters bearing Tibetan stamps delighted his foreign friends, and today they have become major resources for collectors specializing in Tibetan postal history.

== Biography ==
Pratek Man was the eldest of the three children of father Triratna Man Tuladhar and mother Punya Maya Kansakar. His grandfather was the celebrated trader and philanthropist Dharma Man Tuladhar. His younger sister, Tara Devi Tuladhar, was a social worker.

Pratek Man went to Lhasa for the first time in 1939 to join his family business house Chhusingsyar, one of the largest traders in Tibet at the time. The firm maintained branches in Gyantse and Phari besides Ladakh and Kolkata in India. Tuladhar returned after nine years and married Jagat Shobha (1933–1981). He went to Lhasa again in 1952 and returned to Kathmandu for the last time in 1960, after spending a total of 17 years in Tibet.

Tuladhar was among the last of the traditional Lhasa Newar merchants. The historical trade ended after the caravan route linking India and Tibet through Sikkim was shut down by the Sino-Indian War in 1962.

After returning to Nepal, he devoted his time to serving Buddhism. He acted as a translator for Tibetan lamas translating their sermons into the local language, besides writing articles on Buddhism for magazines.
