= Tara Devi Tuladhar =

Nepalese social worker (1931–2012)

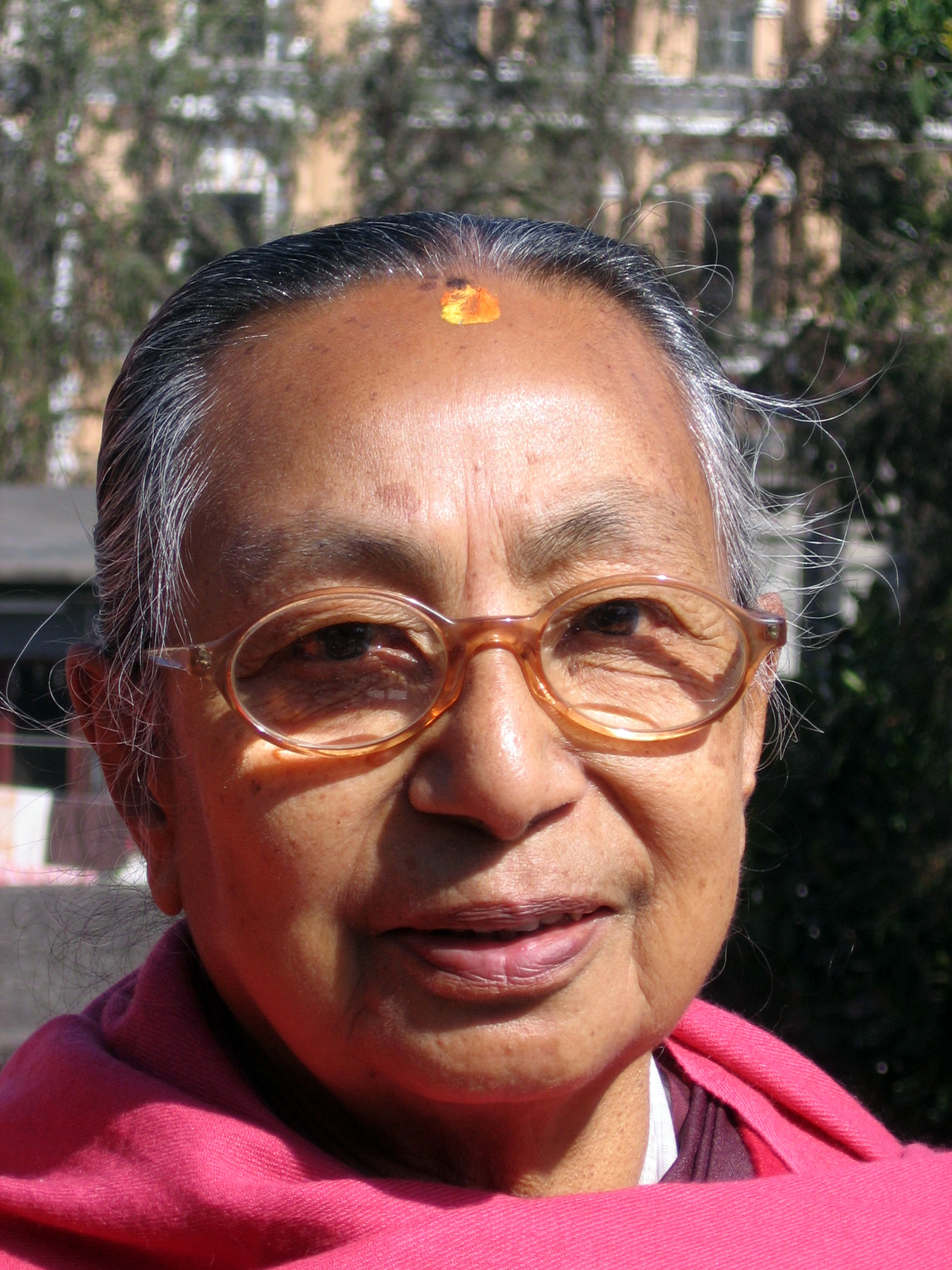
- Born: 21 August 1931; Kathmandu, Nepal
- Died: 27 November 2012 (aged 81); Kathmandu, Nepal
- Known for: First female blood donor, social work
- Medical career
- Profession: Nurse and Educator
- Institutions: Prasuti Griha Maternity Hospital, Nursing School, Tribhuvan University Teaching Hospital
- Sub-specialties: Midwifery

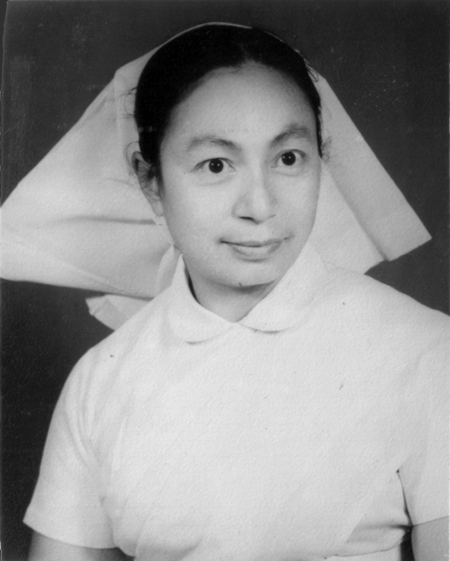
Tara Devi as a nurse in 1961.

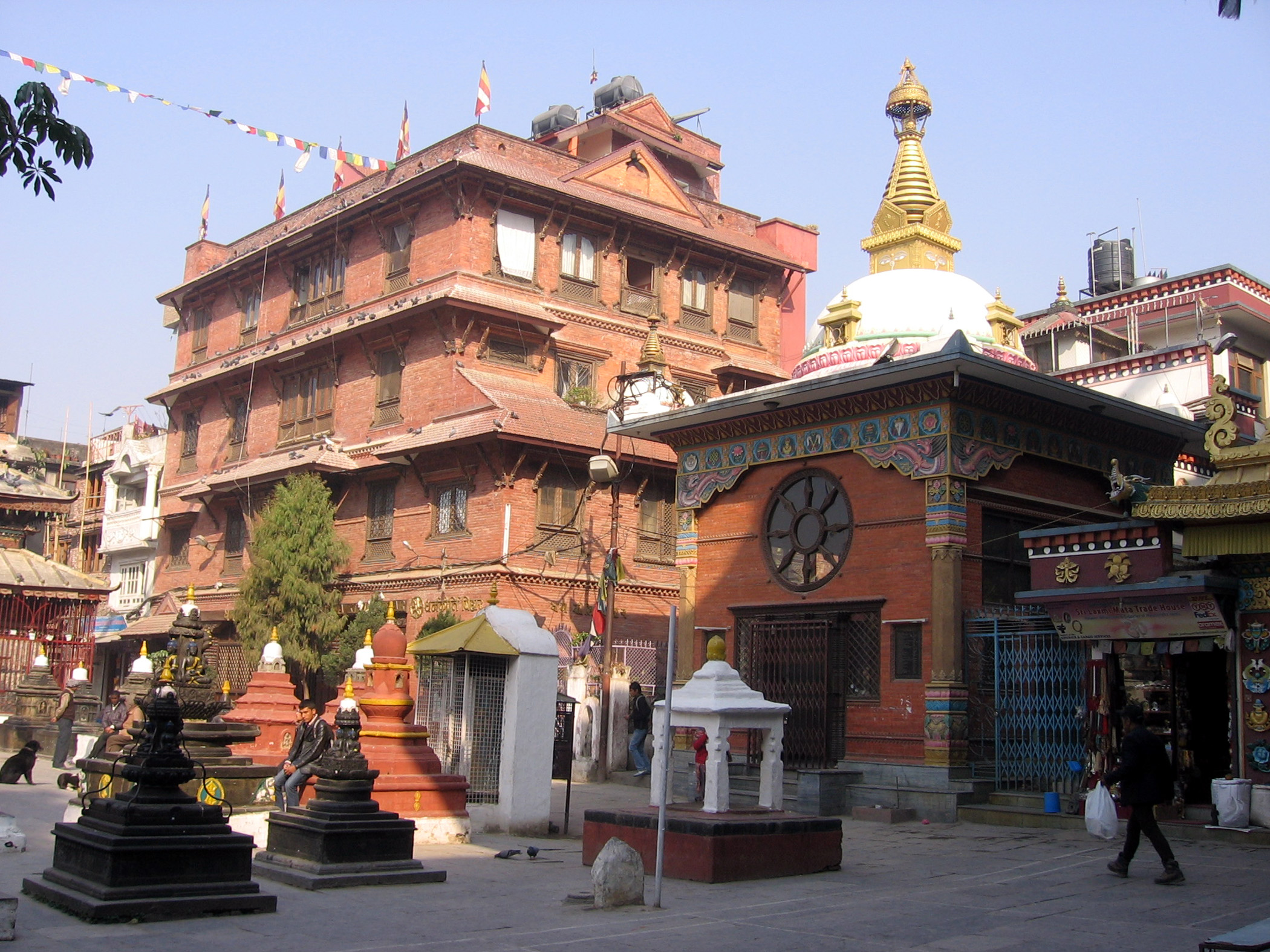
The nunnery of Dharmakirti Vihar, Kathmandu.

Tara Devi Tuladhar (Nepali: तारादेवी तुलाधर) (21 August 1931 – 27 November 2012) was Nepal's first female blood donor and a social worker who dedicated her life to serving society.

== Early life ==
Tara Devi was born to an old merchant family at Tanlāchhi (तंलाछि), Kathmandu. Her father Triratna Man Tuladhar was a Lhasa Newar trader. Her grandfather Dharma Man Tuladhar was a philanthropist best known for renovating the Swayambhu stupa in 1918.

There were only a few schools in the 1930s as the Rana regime did not want ordinary citizens to get an education. For girls, it was even more difficult to join school. So Tara Devi received informal tuition at home.

In 1948, her family sent her to study at St. Josephs's Convent in Kalimpong, India. Returning to Kathmandu, she joined Kanya High School and finished 10th grade. In 1953, she went to Allahabad, India and enrolled at Kamla Nehru Memorial Hospital to pursue her long cherished goal to become a nurse. Two years later, she received her Diploma in Midwifery.

She had been inspired to become a nurse by the tales she had heard as a child about how nurse Vidyabati Kansakar had cared for the injured during the great earthquake of 1934 in Kathmandu.

== Career ==
In 1960, Tara Devi began service at Prasuti Griha Maternity Hospital, Kathmandu. After doing her Post Graduate in Nursing from the College of Nursing, New Delhi in 1964, she became a senior tutor at Nursing School in Kathmandu.

In 1961, she became the first female blood donor in Nepal by donating blood to a patient who was due for surgery and required blood urgently. She was the supervisor at Tribhuvan University Teaching Hospital before she retired in 1990.

== Social service ==
After her retirement, Tara Devi worked as a volunteer at Dharmakirti Vihar, a Theravada Buddhist nunnery in Kathmandu, and used her skills as a trained nurse in the service of the resident nuns and the needy people who came there seeking help. As the coordinator of its health service, she organized free health care every week besides providing training on the care of patients and the elderly. She was also a life member of the Dharmakirti Vihar Conservation Trust.

Tara Devi volunteered at Jana Chikitsalaya, a community clinic in Kathmandu. Besides serving as an executive board member of Paropakar Organisation, the first modern charitable organization in Nepal which was established in 1952, she was an adviser to Udaaya Samaj, a social organization of the Uray community. Tara Devi remained unmarried to be free to pursue her profession.

== Publications ==
Tara Devi has authored two books, one in Nepali and the other in Nepal Bhasa.

- Poshan Bigyān ("Nutrition Science"), published by Tribhuvan University, Institute of Medicine, 1991
- Thāybhu: A Description of Feast Materials, a manual of preparing and presenting ritual foods in Newar Buddhist tradition, published by Chhusinsyar, 2011
