= Nisthananda Bajracharya =

Nepalese writer (1858–1935)

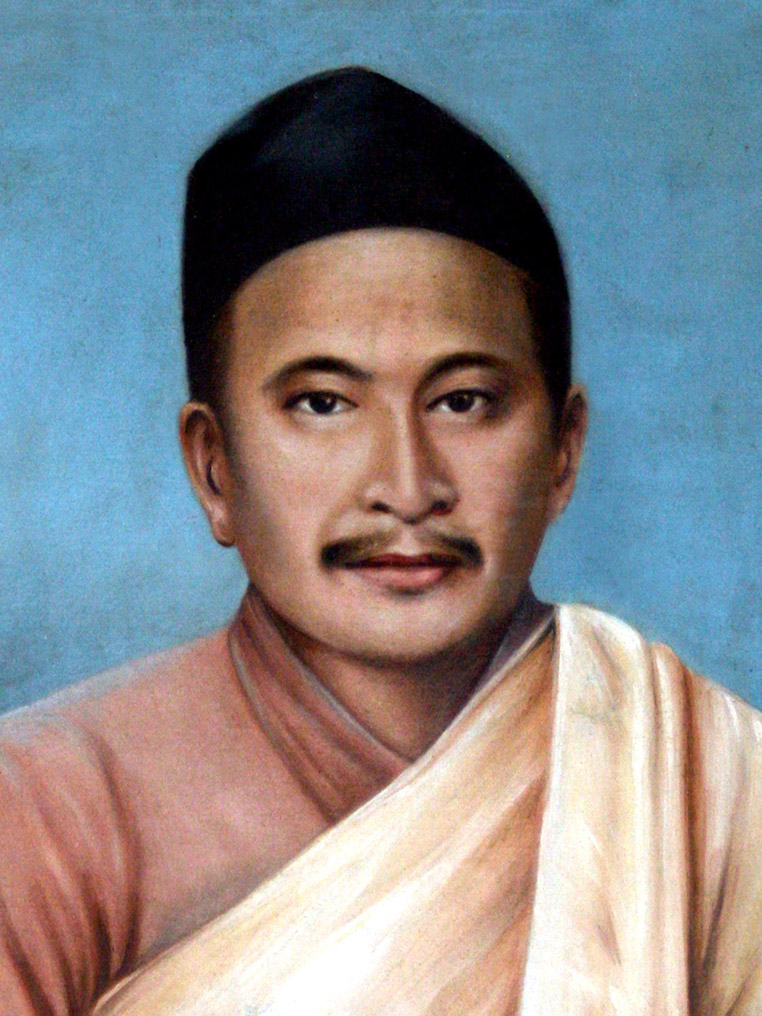
- Portrait of Nisthananda Bajracharya
- Born: 9 December 1858; Om Bahal, Kathmandu
- Died: 29 November 1935 (aged 76)
- Writing career
- Language: Nepal Bhasa
- Literary movement: Nepal Bhasa renaissance

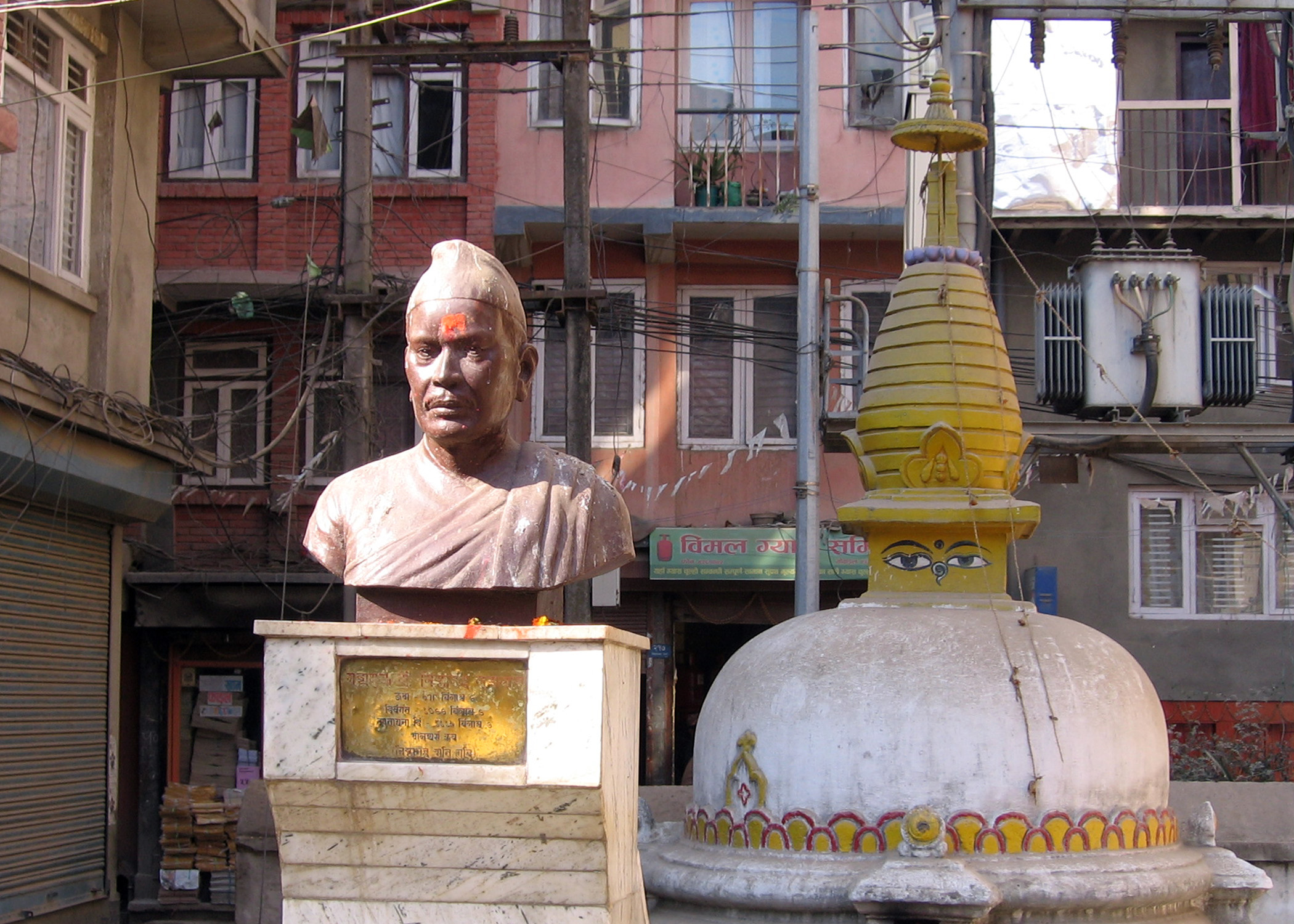
Bust of Nisthananda Bajracharya at Om Bahal, Kathmandu.

Nisthananda Bajracharya (Nepali: निष्ठानन्द बज्राचार्य) (9 December 1858 – 29 November 1935) was a Nepalese writer who marked a turning point in Nepal Bhasa literature by breaking away from the classical style and writing prose in colloquial language. He was one of the leaders of the Nepal Bhasa renaissance, and also a pioneer of printing with moveable type in Nepal. He is honored as one of the Four Pillars of Nepal Bhasa.

== Early life ==
Bajracharya was born in Om Bahal, Kathmandu to father Muktananda and mother Thakumati Bajracharya. He belonged to a family of hereditary Newari Buddhist priests, who engaged in performing sacred rituals. His first wife Ratna Prabha died in 1901, and he subsequently married Dyah Mayju.

== Career ==
In 1901, after completing Buddhist studies, Bajracharya began giving religious discourses. His storytelling sessions were held in sacred courtyards and other open spaces and lasted four months. Bajracharya had a clear style of narrating stories which made him greatly popular. He adapted the ancient texts into easy-to-understand everyday language, as the old writing style had become complex to listeners.

The written and spoken forms of Nepal Bhasa had begun to grow apart as its development came to an end around 1850 with the advent of the Rana dynasty. The Ranas did not like Nepal Bhasa and suppressed its use. By the time literary activities were revived during the Nepal Bhasa renaissance, the old style of writing had become difficult to follow. Bajracharya modernized the language by discarding the traditional spelling rules and writing it as it was spoken. He also brought a new style into prose writing by simplifying sentence construction.

== Publications ==
In 1909, Bajracharya published Ek Bishanti Prajnaparamita, the first book in Nepal Bhasa to be printed with moveable type. Lalita Vistara, his most famous work which is based on the Buddha's life story, and Swayambhu Purana were published in 1914. Bajracharya travelled to Kolkata, India to procure letterpress type as printing facilities were not available in Kathmandu. He did the typesetting and printing himself. Lalita Vistara also contributed to the revival of Buddhism in the 1920s.

== Legacy ==
A bust of Bajracharya was erected at his birthplace Om Bahal, Kathmandu on 23 November 1998 by Olympus Club (Nisthananda Memorial Trust). A street in central Kathmandu was named Nisthananda Marg in his honor by Kathmandu Metropolitan City.
