= Four Pillars of Nepal Bhasa =

Pioneer Nepal Bhasa writers

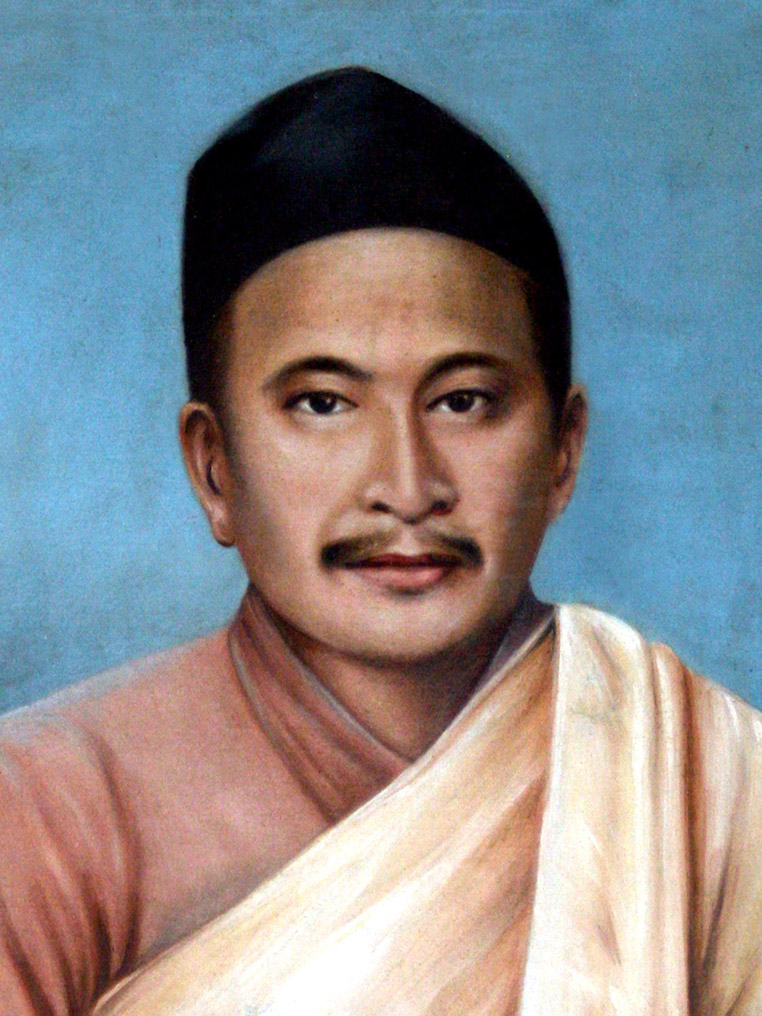
Nisthananda Bajracharya

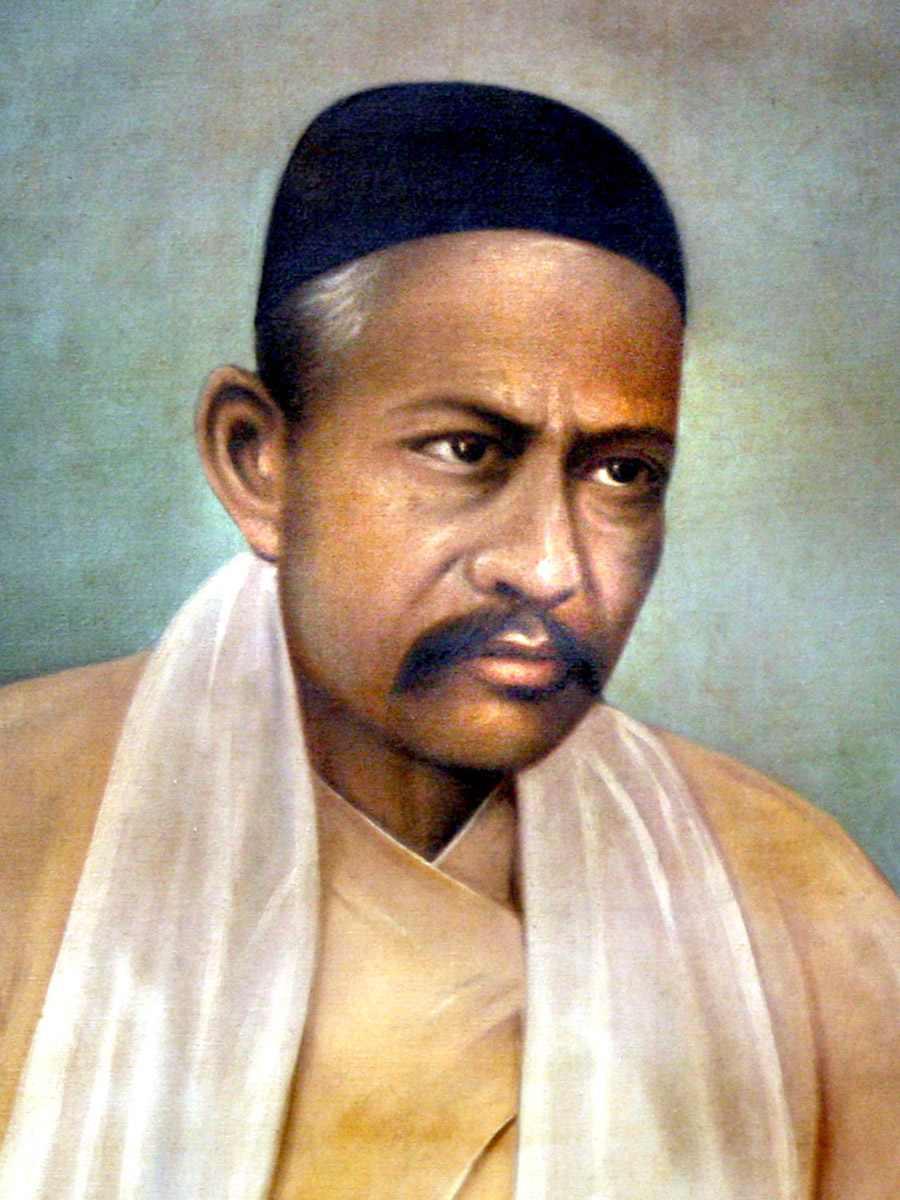
Siddhidas Mahaju

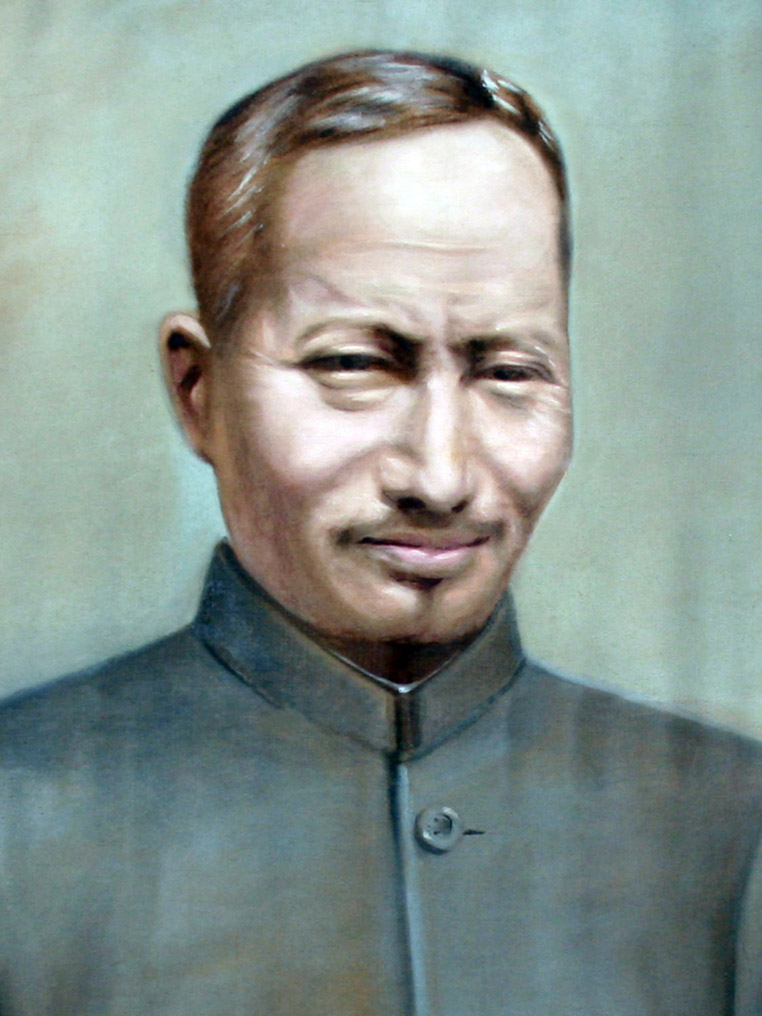
Jagat Sundar Malla

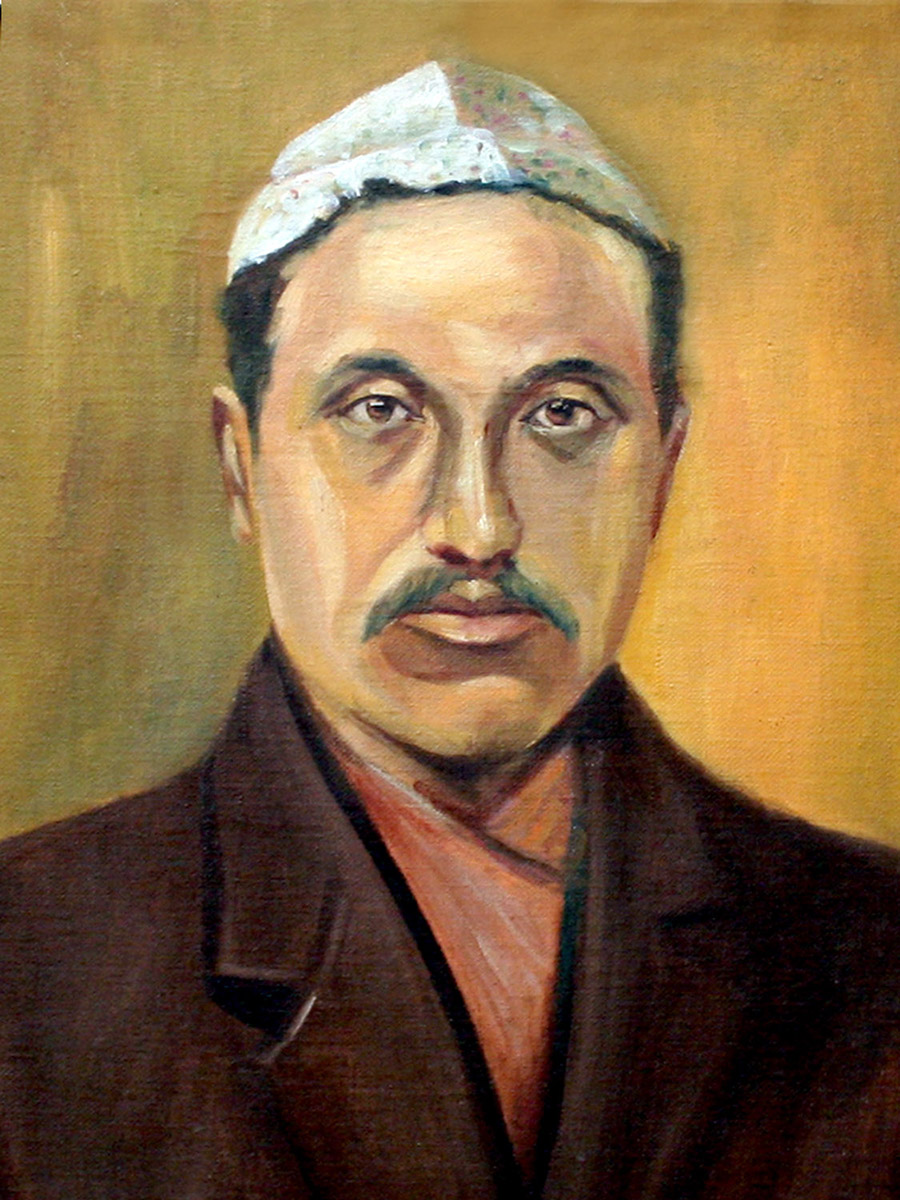
Yogbir Singh Kansakar

Four Pillars of Nepal Bhasa (Nepali: नेपालभाषाका चार स्तम्भ, Newar: नेपाल भाषाया प्यंगः थां) are the four leaders who spearheaded the campaign to revive the Newar language and its literature during the repressive Rana regime, and guided its renaissance at the beginning of the 20th century.

They produced literature at the risk of personal freedom and laid the foundation for the development of modern Nepal Bhasa. Their work marks the beginning of the Nepal Bhasa movement in Kathmandu, which has led to greater rights in education, the media and official recognition.

The four figures honored as the four pillars of the Nepal Bhasa renaissance are author Nisthananda Bajracharya, poet Siddhidas Mahaju, educationist Jagat Sundar Malla and poet Yogbir Singh Kansakar.

== Nisthananda Bajracharya ==
Nisthananda Bajracharya (1858 - 1935) marked a turning point by breaking away from the classical style and writing prose in colloquial language. In 1909, Bajracharya published Ek Bishanti Prajnaparamita, the first book in Nepal Bhasa to be printed with moveable type. Lalita Vistara, his most famous work which is based on the Buddha's life story, and Swayambhu Purana were published in 1914.

== Siddhidas Mahaju ==
Siddhidas Mahaju (alternative name: Siddhidas Amatya) (1867 - 1929) was at the forefront in the endeavour to revive literature in Nepal Bhasa. He has been honored with the title Great Poet. Mahaju wrote more than 44 books of poetry, epics, short stories and essays. Sajjan Hridayabharan, a book of poems on morals which came out in 1920, was the only one published during his lifetime. Mahaju composed Siddhi Ramayana, a translation of the epic Ramayana in Nepal Bhasa, in 1913.

== Jagat Sundar Malla ==
Jagat Sundar Malla (1882 - 1952) was a teacher and writer who dedicated his life to the education of the common people. In 1913, Malla opened a school in his home defying government disapproval. He stressed the importance of learning English, and he wrote and published textbooks in Nepalese languages as he believed that children learn faster if they are taught in their mother tongue.

== Yogbir Singh Kansakar ==
Yogbir Singh Kansakar (alternative name: Jogbir Singh Kansakar) (1885 - 1942) was a poet and social reformer who worked to develop his mother tongue. In 1929, Kansakar headed a committee which petitioned the prime minister to be allowed to open a library for which he was arrested and fined. He has also been publicly flogged for his reformist activities. An anthology of Kansakar's poems entitled Yog-Sudha was published by Nepal Bhasa Parishad in 1951.

== See also ==
- Nepal Bhasa movement
- Nepal Bhasa literature
