= Triratna Man Tuladhar =

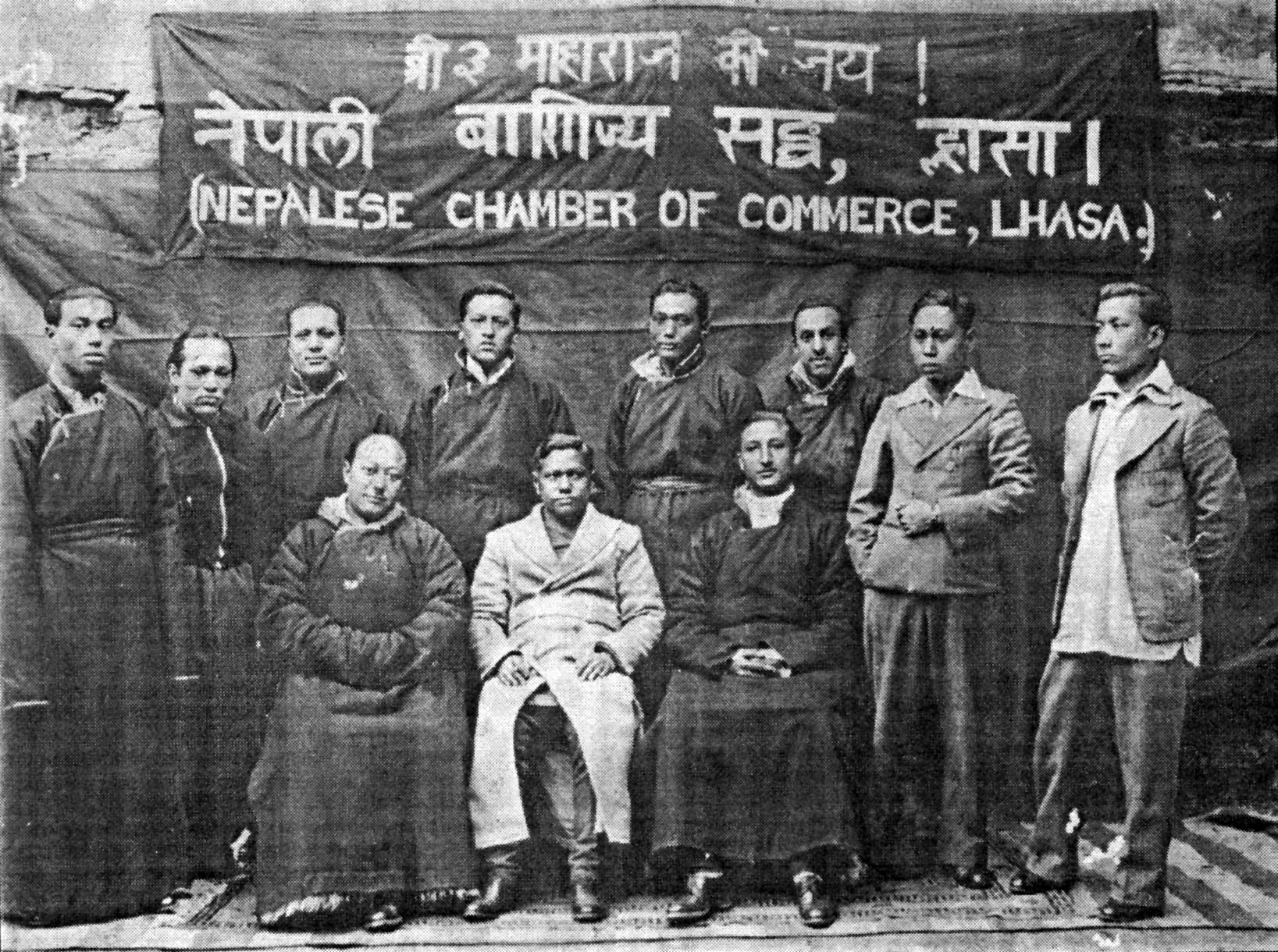
Triratna Man Tuladhar (seated, left) in Lhasa in 1947.

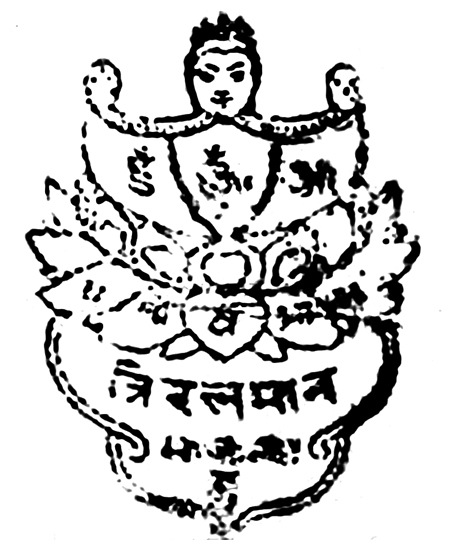
Triratna Man's trader's mark

Triratna Man Tuladhar (Nepali: त्रिरत्नमान तुलाधर) (1905-1986) was one of the largest Nepalese traders in traditional Tibet and the president of the Nepalese Chamber of Commerce, Lhasa in the 1940s.

== Early life ==
Triratna Man (alternative name: Lhandur) was born at Nyata, Kathmandu, the eldest of the three sons of trader and philanthropist Dharma Man Tuladhar and mother Hera Lani Tuladhar. He was educated at home, and taught himself English and Chinese. He learned Tibetan and Hindi during his stay in Tibet and India. In 1913, he was married to Punya Maya Kansakar.

Triratna Man was also an activist in the movement to revive Theravada Buddhism in Nepal; and in 1924, became a member of the Buddhist Relief Association founded by Buddhist scholar and leader Dharmaditya Dharmacharya.

== Business in Tibet ==
Triratna Man belonged to a long line of Lhasa Newar merchants. His family owned a business house in Lhasa known as Chhusingsyar which has a history dating from 1790 AD. The firm conducted trade between Nepal, India and Tibet. Its main business was musk, brocade, gems, textiles and general merchandise. Besides its main shop in Lhasa, the firm maintained shops in Gyantse and Phari in Tibet, and in Kalimpong, Kolkata and Ladakh in India. The firm in Kolkata was known as Dharma Man Purna Man - Tibetan Musk Depot.

Triratna Man went to Lhasa for the first time in 1928 and managed the family business. He returned to Nepal in 1929. He made two more trips to Lhasa, and lived there from 1935-1941 and from 1947-1953, spending a total of 13 years in Tibet.

In 1947, Triratna Man became president of the Nepalese Chamber of Commerce, Lhasa and held the post for a year.

After he returned to Nepal leaving the business in the care of his sons, he was elected to the executive committee of the Kathmandu Chapter of the association in 1955. He sat on the committee until 1957.

His eldest son Pratek Man Tuladhar wound up the business house of Chhusingsyar and returned to Nepal in 1960. The traditional Tibet trade came to an end following the Sino-Indian War of 1962 when the trade route through Sikkim was shut down. Triratna Man then settled down to a quiet life in Kathmandu.
