= Padma Sundar Malla =

Nepal's first electrical engineer

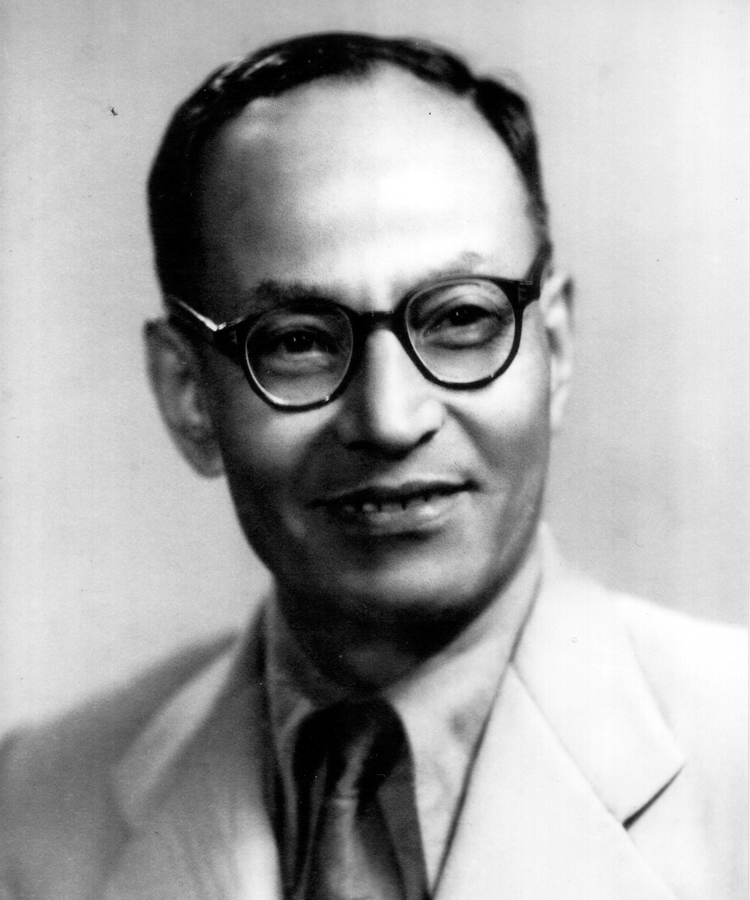
Padma Sundar Malla in the 1950s

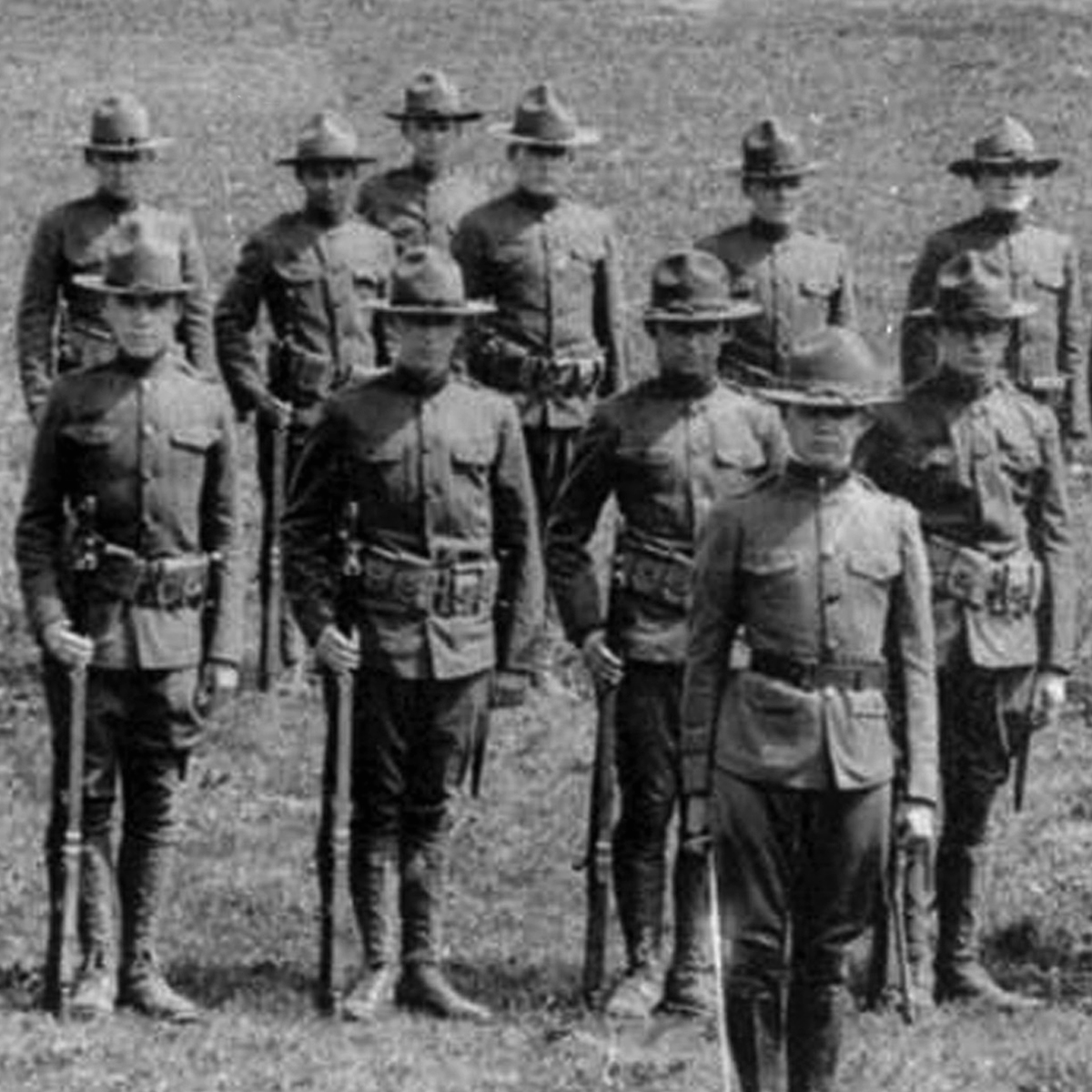
Padma Sundar (second left, back row) as an ROTC cadet in the 1920s

Padma Sundar Malla (1890–1974) (Nepali: पद्मसुन्दर मल्ल) was Nepal's first electrical engineer and the first Nepalese to visit the United States. He pioneered the generation of electricity in Nepal which provided power to the country's emerging industrial sector.

== Early life ==
Padma Sundar was born at Khauma Tol, Bhaktapur, the third among four brothers. His eldest brother was renowned educationist and author Jagat Sundar Malla. The family moved to Asan in Kathmandu so they could study at Durbar High School. Padma Sundar was inspired to go to Japan for higher studies after meeting with Japanese Buddhist monk and traveler Ekai Kawaguchi in Kathmandu.

== Japan and America ==
In 1916, Padma Sundar and his elder brother Jagat Sundar went to Kolkata, India and secretly sailed for Japan as the government would not have given them permission to do so. The Rana regime disapproved of the general public getting an education. In Japan, Padma Sundar enrolled at the Tokyo Institute of Technology. His brother returned after making arrangements for his study and stay.

After obtaining a Bachelor of Science degree in Tokyo, he teamed up with a few Japanese friends and set sail for America for further studies. He joined the University of Michigan and studied electrical engineering, also earning the distinction of being the first Nepalese in the US.

While a student at the University of Michigan, he joined the Reserve Officers' Training Corps (ROTC) as a cadet. In 1922, he received his degree in electrical engineering.

== Electrical engineer ==
When Padma Sundar returned to Nepal in 1925, he was not allowed to enter Kathmandu for having travelled abroad without permission. So he moved to Kurseong in West Bengal, India. In 1933, he set up his first hydropower station known as the Faji hydroelectric project which supplied energy to Kurseong.

The Nepal government sent for Padma Sundar in 1939, and named him the chief engineer of the Morang Hydroelectric Company. He designed the power station that supplied energy to Biratnagar Jute Mill, Biratnagar. He also designed other plants in Birgunj and Dharan.

== Honors ==
In 1941, Padma Sundar was made an associate member of the Institution of Electrical Engineers, a British professional body.

Padma Sundar moved back to Kathmandu in the 1950s where he lived the rest of his life. He has been called the "father of Nepalese hydropower" for his pioneering work.
