= Siddhidas Mahaju =

Nepal Bhasa poet (1867 - 1929)

Postage stamp of Mahaju issued in 1980.

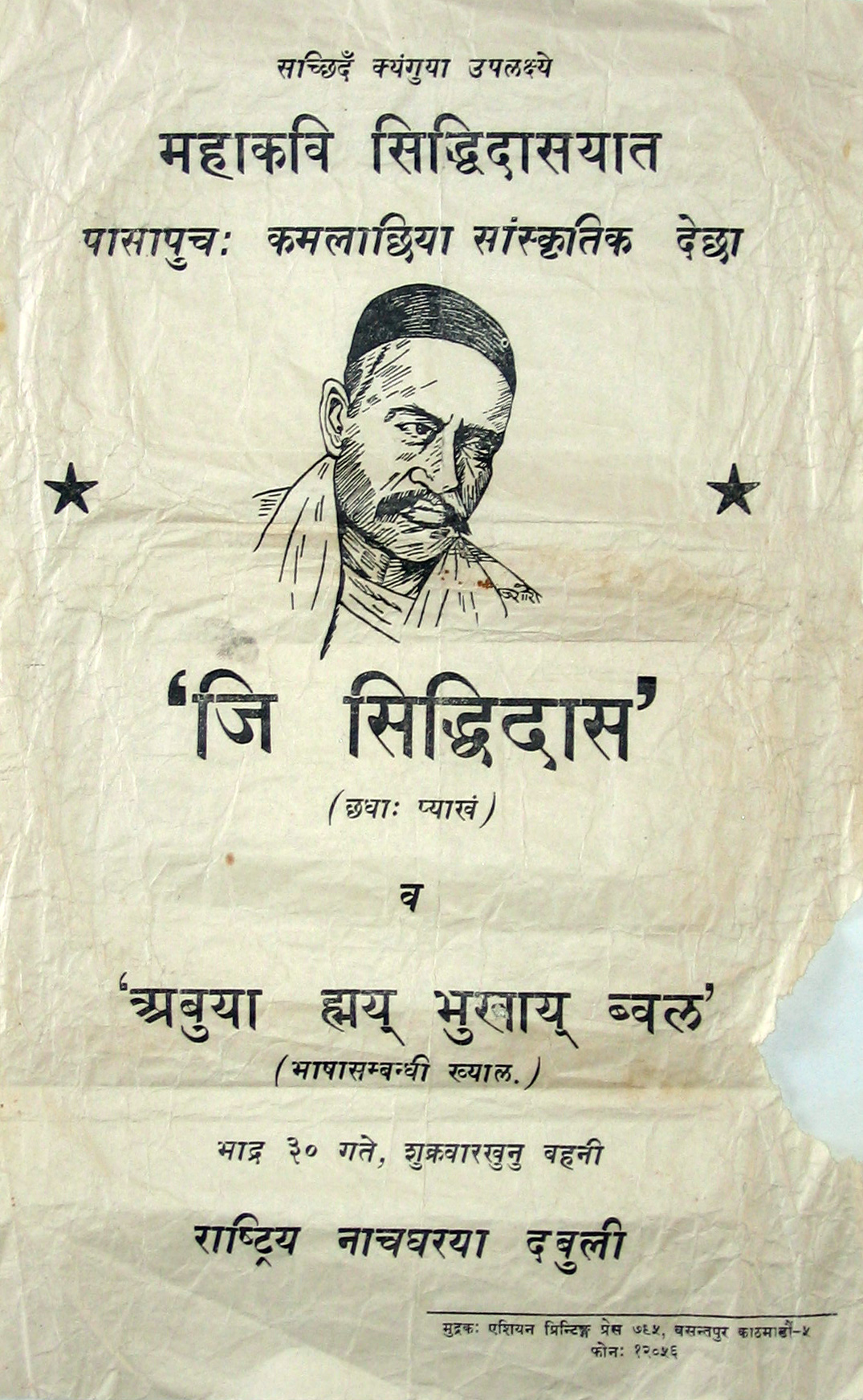
Pamphlet advertising drama performance about Siddhidas Mahaju to celebrate his birth centenary in 1967.

Siddhidas Mahaju (Nepali: सिद्धिदास महाजु) (alternative name: Siddhidas Amatya) (15 October 1867 – 29 December 1929) was a Nepalese poet and one of the Four Pillars of Nepal Bhasa. He was at the forefront in the endeavour to revive literature in Nepal Bhasa that had become stagnant as a result of official suppression. He has been honored with the title Great Poet.

== Early life ==
Mahaju was born in Kel Tol, Kathmandu to father Laxmi Narayan and mother Harsha Laxmi. He studied at home under various tutors, and married Ganga Devi at an early age.

== Career ==
Mahaju looked after his family's cloth shop as a young man after a stint in government service in 1886. He had to travel frequently to Kolkata, India to purchase stock, and he took advantage of the opportunity to browse libraries and book stores.

In Kathmandu, he spent more time composing poetry than looking after business, and his cloth shop suffered. Finding it difficult to make ends meet, he went to Birgunj to work for a trader as a freight forwarder. Mahaju returned to Kathmandu after a few years when business dried up. His economic condition worsened; and in 1927, he got a job as an assistant at a medicine shop.

Distressed by an unhappy family life and bad health, Mahaju went to live with his sister during his final days. He died at Pashupati.

== Works ==
Mahaju wrote more than 44 books of poetry, epics, short stories and essays. Sajjan Hridayabharan, a book of poems on morals, was the only one published during his lifetime. It was published from Bettiah, India in 1920. Mahaju composed Siddhi Ramayana, a translation of the epic Ramayana in Nepal Bhasa, in 1913. It was published by Thaunkanhe Prakashan in 2010.

Other notable works include Satyasati (an epic on female education and considered to be his best work, written in 1913) and Siddhi Vyakaran (a grammar of Nepal Bhasa, written in 1927).

== Legacy ==
In 1980, the Postal Service Department of the government of Nepal issued a commemorative postage stamp of Mahaju. A street in central Kathmandu was named Siddhidas Marg in his honor by Kathmandu Metropolitan City. A statue of Mahaju was erected in Hetauda in 2006.

A statue of poet Siddhidash Mahaju was established at Ratnapark, Kathmandu on the day of his birth anniversary on September 29, 2015.
