= Nepalese Chamber of Commerce, Lhasa =

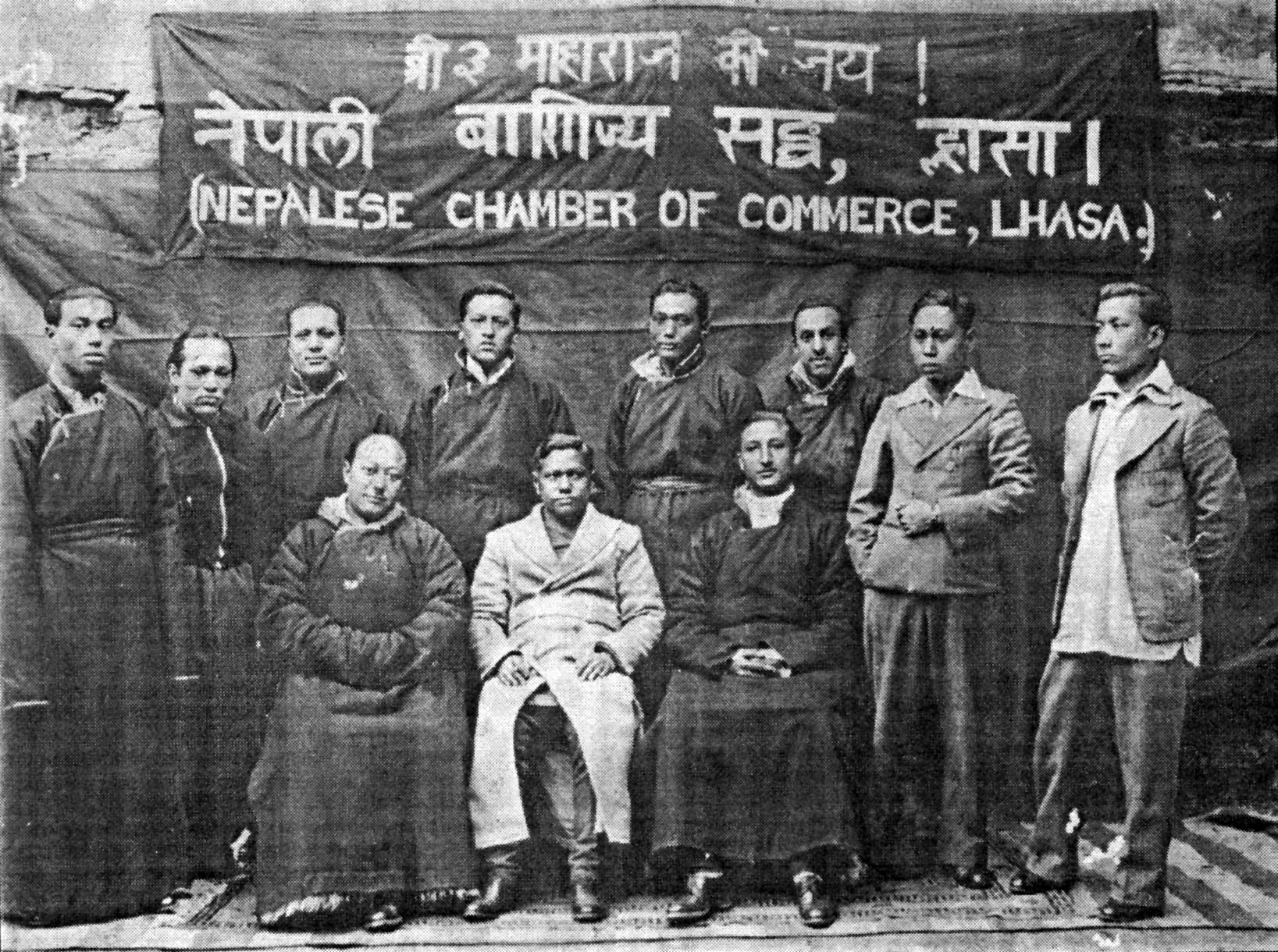
Triratna Man Tuladhar (seated, left) and Gyan Jyoti Kansakar (seated, right) with other members in Lhasa, 1947.

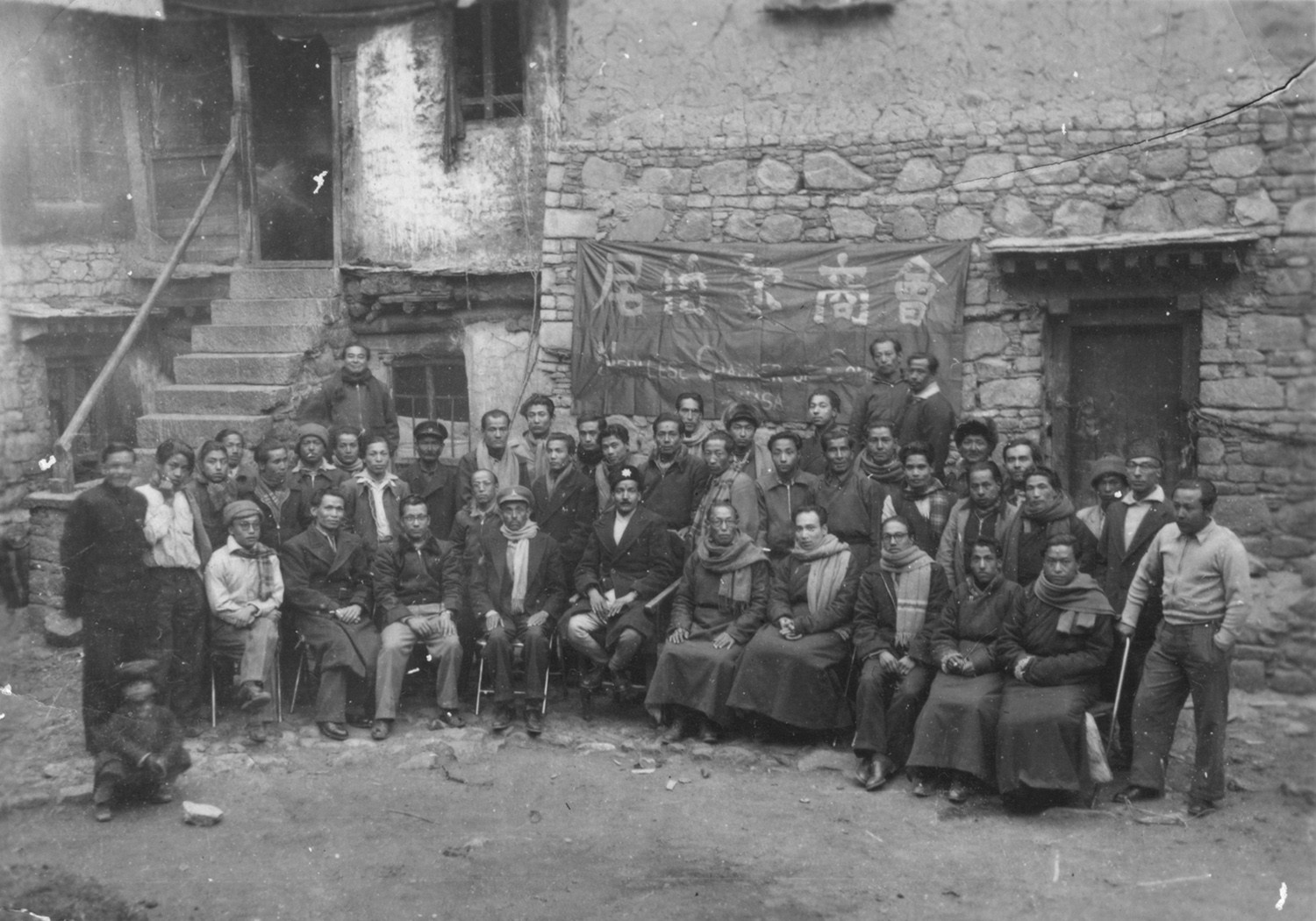
Nepalese Chamber of Commerce, Lhasa in 1955.

The Nepalese Chamber of Commerce, Lhasa opened in 1943, the first ever organization of businesses formed by Nepalese traders based in the Tibetan capital. The Newar merchants conducted trade between Lhasa and Kolkata transporting goods over the Himalaya by mule caravan. The chamber of commerce worked to promote trade and coordinated among its members to set uniform prices for their merchandise besides lobbying with the government for business-friendly policy.

== History ==
The first president of the chamber of commerce was Gyan Ratna Tuladhar and the secretary was Purna Kaji Tamrakar.

The Nepalese Chamber of Commerce, Lhasa closed down after a year. It was revived in 1947 with Triratna Man Tuladhar, of the business house of Chhusingsyar, as president.

== Kathmandu office ==
An office of the Nepalese Chamber of Commerce, Lhasa was opened in Kathmandu in 1952. The chamber gave a reception to welcome Chinese Premier Zhou Enlai during his first visit to Nepal in 1957. In 1960, during Premier Zhou Enlai's second visit, the chamber held a reception programme in his honor on April 26.

The Nepalese Chamber of Commerce, Lhasa and its Kathmandu office shut down in the mid-1960s when the traditional trade came to an end after the trade route through Sikkim was closed by the Sino-Indian War.

== See also ==
- Lhasa Newar (trans-Himalayan traders)
