= Yogbir Singh Kansakar =

Nepalese poet

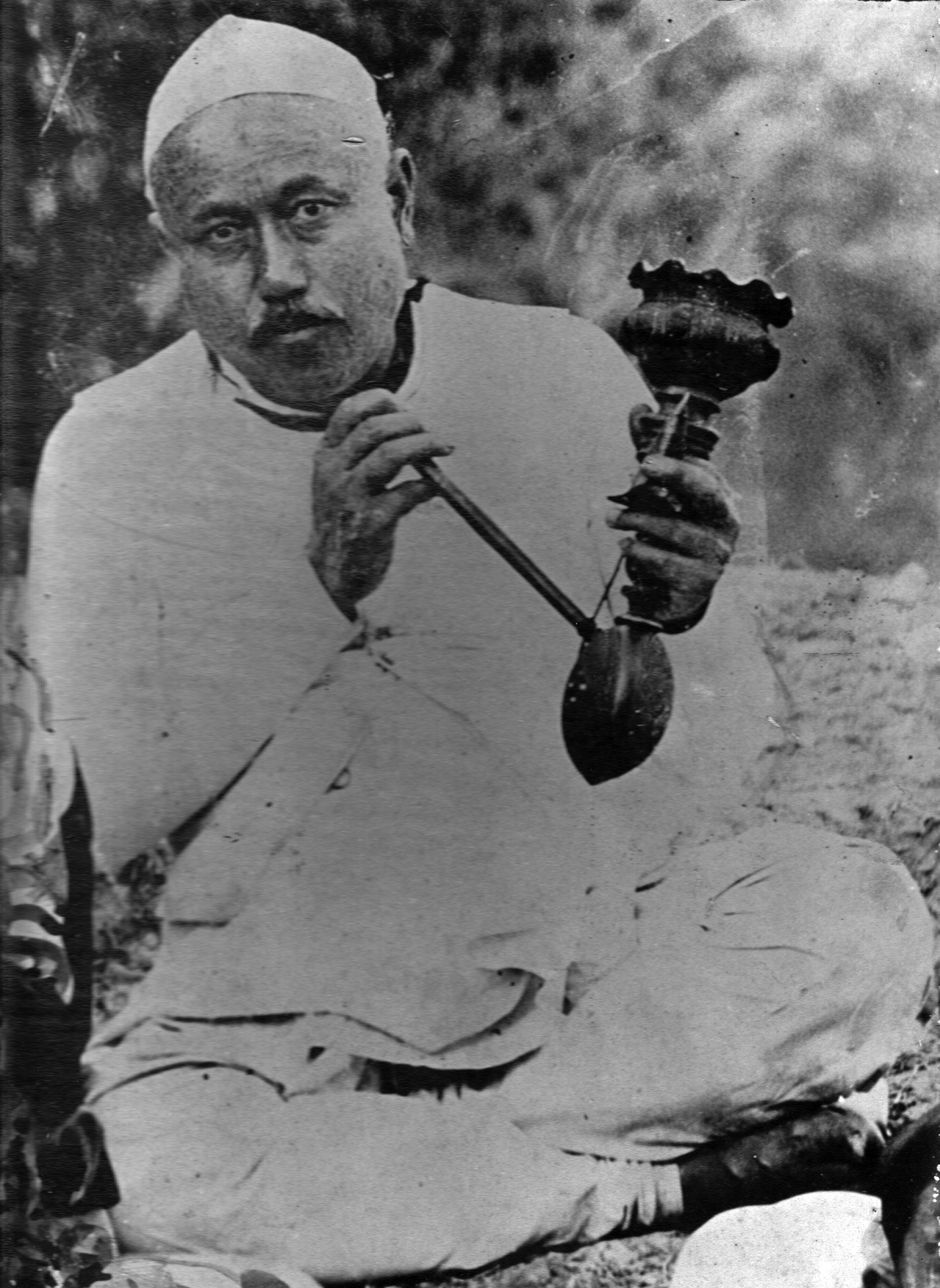
Yogbir Singh Kansakar

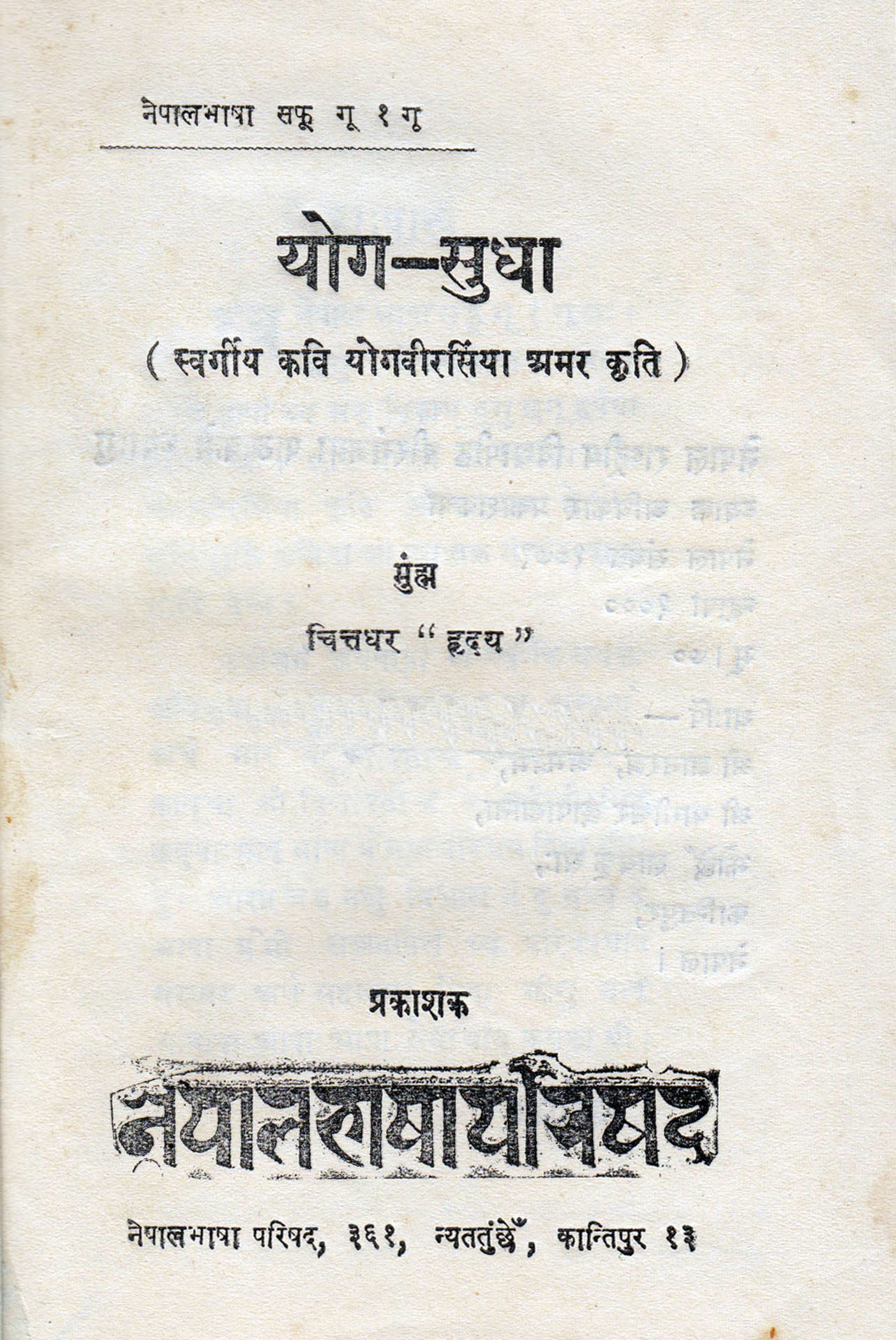
Title page of Yog-Sudha published in 1951.

Yogbir Singh Kansakar (Nepali: योगवीरसिं कंसकार) (alternative name: Jogbir Singh Kansakar) (16 April 1885 – 29 March 1942) was a Nepalese poet, social reformer and one of the Four Pillars of Nepal Bhasa. He worked to develop his mother tongue and promote Arya Samaj sect of Hinduism and Buddhism in the face of repression by the Rana rulers.

Kansakar was the guru and inspiration of Chittadhar Hridaya, one of the greatest literary figures of 20th century Nepal.

== Early life ==
Kansakar was born at Kel Tol, Kwachhen Nani, Kathmandu. His father was Chaityabir Singh and his mother was Laxmi Nani. The family owned a cloth shop. As a young man in 1905, Kansakar became involved in the social reformist activities of an organization known as Arya Samaj. He was fined and jailed by the Ranas for promoting an unorthodox religion. Out of prison, a dejected Kansakar went to Kolkata, India where he was inspired by the activity in Bengali language publication and love of literature among Bengalis.

== Career ==
Returning to Kathmandu, Kansakar took to writing poetry, and his cloth shop was turned into a gathering place for poets. Each week, they would bring a copybook filled with their compositions and discuss each other's works. When the Bada Guruju (chief royal priest) learned about it, he had all the copybooks confiscated.

Inspired by Tulsi Meher's homespun movement, Kansakar campaigned to popularize homespun and encouraged people to install handlooms in their homes. In 1927, he established a company named Vastrakala Bhavan to produce textiles. Kansakar was an advocate of female education, and he sent his daughter Vidyabati Kansakar to India among the first batch of students to receive nurse training.

== Library incident ==
In 1929, Kansakar headed a committee which petitioned the prime minister to be allowed to open a library. Kansakar and the rest of the signers of the appeal were arrested and fined. In 1934, all the Newar authors were summoned before the prime minister and warned to stop writing in Nepal Bhasa.

Kansakar also worked to promote Theravada Buddhism which aroused the anger of the government. In 1931, he was fined and jailed with 11 other people including Buddhist teacher Dhammalok Mahasthavir, poet Chittadhar Hridaya and trader Dharma Man Tuladhar for trying to spread an "unorthodox religion". He was also harassed and flogged for his activities.

His wife Shobha Laxmi died in 1937, and he married Buddha Maya. In 1940, the government mounted a clampdown against political workers, writers and anybody it saw as a threat to the state. Kansakar was arrested and held for 85 days.

An anthology of Kansakar's poems entitled Yog-Sudha was published by Nepal Bhasa Parisad in 1951.

== Legacy ==
A street in central Kathmandu was named Yogbir Singh Marg in his honor by Kathmandu Metropolitan City.
