= Jagat Sundar Malla =

Nepalese educator (1882–1952)

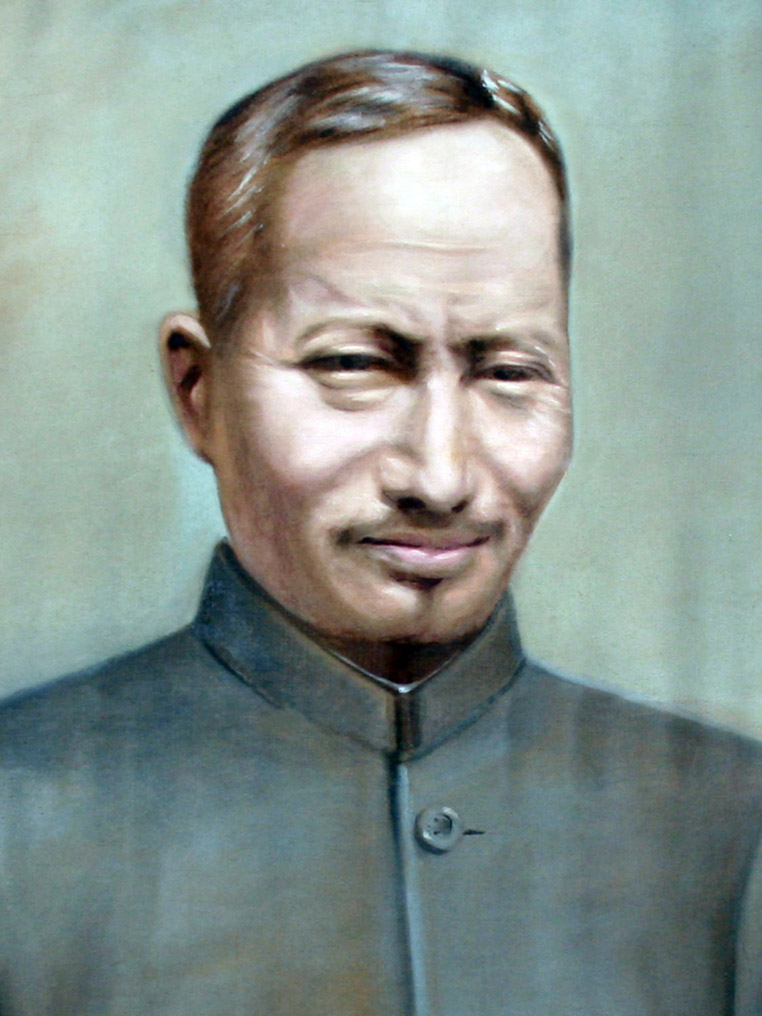
Jagat Sundar Malla

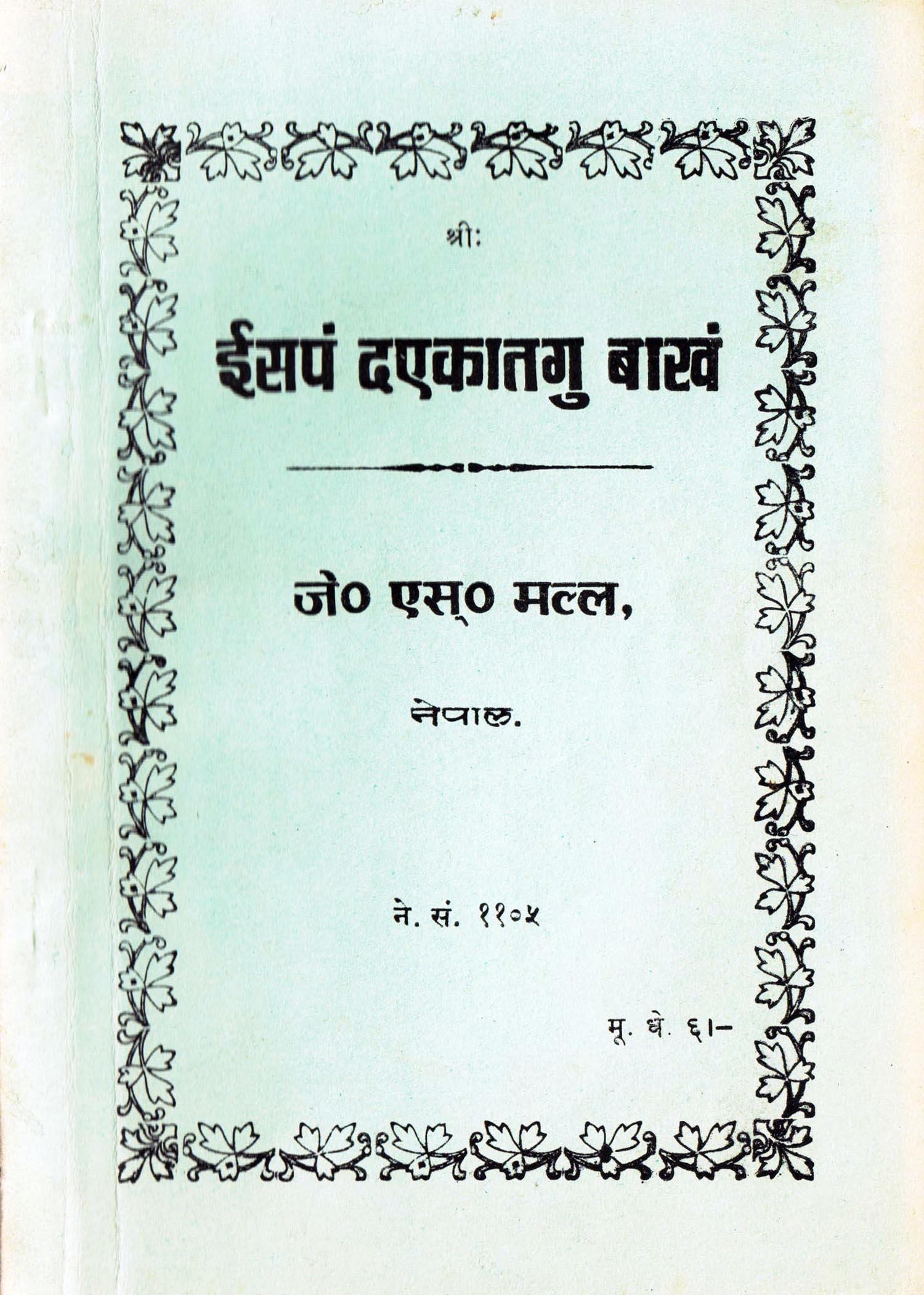
Aesop's Fables in Nepal Bhasa by Jagat Sundar Malla, first published in 1915.

Jagat Sundar Malla (1882 - 1952) (Nepali: जगतसुन्दर मल्ल) was a Nepalese teacher and writer who dedicated his life to the education of the common people.

Malla opened a school in his home defying government repression as the Rana regime disapproved of any move to spread modern education. He stressed the importance of learning English, and he wrote and published textbooks in Nepalese languages as he believed that children learn faster if they are taught in their mother tongue. He is honored as one of the Four Pillars of Nepal Bhasa.

== Early life ==
Malla was born in Khauma, Bhaktapur to father Bishnu Dhar and mother Jagat Laxmi. He moved to Asan, Kathmandu at the age of 10 to enroll at Durbar High School, the only modern educational institution in the country. After class 10 at Durbar High School, Malla went to Kolkata where he studied up to the entrance level at Scottish Church School. He was married to Janak Laxmi Malla.

== Career ==
Malla established a school at Khauma, Bhaktapur in 1913 where he taught English in Nepal Bhasa. In 1916, Malla and his young brother Padma Sundar Malla went to Japan for higher education which was unavailable in Nepal. He returned to India leaving Padma Sundar in Japan as there wasn't enough money for both of them.

In the midst of World War I, Malla was arrested upon his arrival by the British Indian government on the suspicion of being a spy. He was imprisoned in Darbhanga for one and a half years, and freed after the Nepal government confirmed that he was a Nepalese citizen. Malla returned to Nepal in 1917, and was grounded by the government for having left the country without an official permit. Despite the mental stress, Malla kept teaching and writing textbooks.

== Works ==
Among Malla's notable works are

- English-Nepal Bhasa-English Dictionary
- Aesopan Dayekatahgu Bakhan (Nepal Bhasa translation of Aesop's Fables published in 1915)
- English Grammar in Parbatiya
- Gorkhali Angrezi First Book
- Nepali Angrezi First Book (Nepal Bhasa).

== Legacy ==
On 25 October 1992, a statue was erected in his honor in Bhaktapur by Bhaktapur Municipality. Jagat Sundar Bwonekuthi, a Nepal Bhasa-medium school named after him, opened in Kathmandu in 1991. A street in the historic section of Kathmandu was named Jagat Sundar Marg by Kathmandu Metropolitan City.
