= Vidyabati Kansakar =

Nepali nurse

- विद्याबति कंसकार
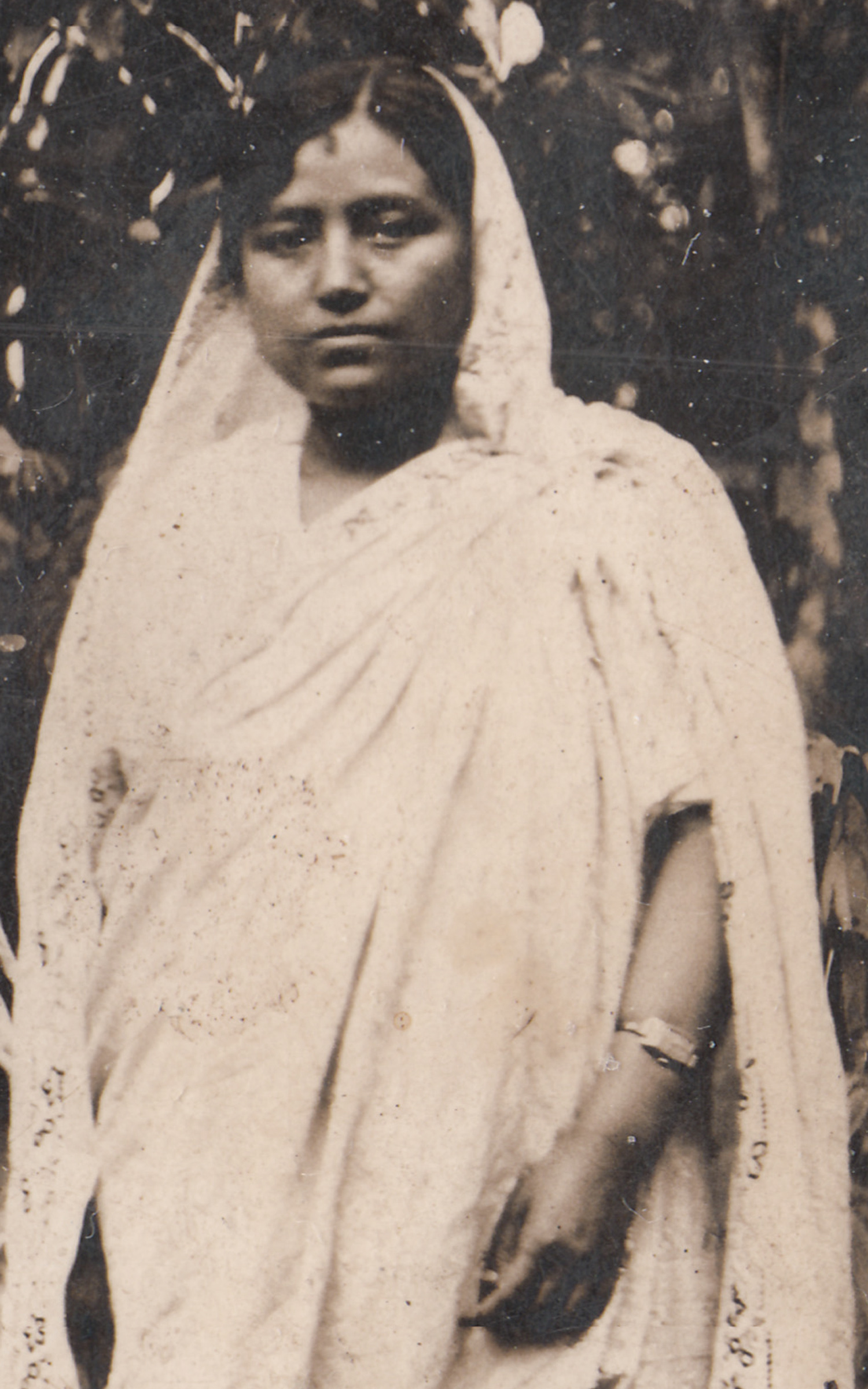
- Vidyabati Kansakar in 1934
- Born: 1906; Kathmandu, Nepali
- Died: 31 January 1976 (aged 69–70)
- Education: 18 months midwifery training in Allahabad, India
- Occupation: Nurse at Bir Hospital
- Era: Rana period (1928-1985 BS)
- Known for: One of the first nurses and key figures in the development of modern health services of Nepal
- Relatives: Yogbir Singh Kansakar (father) Shobha Laxmi Kansakar (mother) 4 unknown siblings
- Family: Kansakar family
- Honours: Order of Gorkha Dakshina Bahu

Vidyabati Kansakar (Nepali: विद्याबति कंसकार) (1906 – 31 January 1976) was a pioneer of nursing in Nepal. She was among the first batch of four women sent abroad to Allahabad, India receive nurse training in 1928. They served at Nepal's only hospital Bir Hospital after their education, and became key figures in the development of modern health services in the country.

== Early life ==
Vidyabati was born in Kathmandu, Nepal to father, Yogbir Singh Kansakar, and mother, Shova Laxmi. The eldest of five children, she lost her mother early in life. As a result, the responsibility of looking after her siblings fell on her. She received informal education at home from her poet father as the government did not permit girls to go to school.

== Career ==
In 1928 (the Rana period), Vidyabati got an opportunity to pursue her interest in serving society when the government decided to send a few women to Allahabad, India. They were trained in modern nursing with an 18 months course of midwifery training as there were no nurses in Nepal. She was among the four candidates selected, and when they returned after their education, they became the first nurses in the country.

Nepal's first allopathic hospital Bir Hospital opened in Kathmandu in 1890. It was staffed by foreign doctors, but there were no nurses. In a bid to fulfill this lack, the government sent four women to Allahabad. They served at Bir Hospital after their return from India.

Vidyabati set an example of selfless service with her dedication to her profession. After work at the hospital, she would attend to the patients who thronged her home. She made house calls regardless of the hour. Her income also helped to support the family, as her father was often jailed by the government for writing in Nepal Bhasa, a language it sought to suppress. Her father's cloth shop was a gathering place for poets where they discussed literature. In 1929, he and his companions were arrested and fined by the government for applying to open a public library.

When her ancestral home at Kel Tol was damaged by the Great Earthquake of 1934, she helped her father buy a piece of land and build a new house. Vidyabati and her colleagues worked extra hard treating the wounded after the devastating quake. The experience gave them improved medical skills, and they became even more sought after.

When Vidyabati was in her late 40s, she got diabetes. She was advised to retire, but she continued to maintain a hectic schedule. Her health continued to worsen, and in 1965, she was forced to retire. She was poor of sight and bedridden during her last days.

== Honors ==
Vidyabati Kansakar was awarded the Order of Gorkha Dakshina Bahu by the king of Nepal for her services to the country.
