= Swayambhu Purana =

One of the texts of Newar Buddhism

Svayambhu Purana
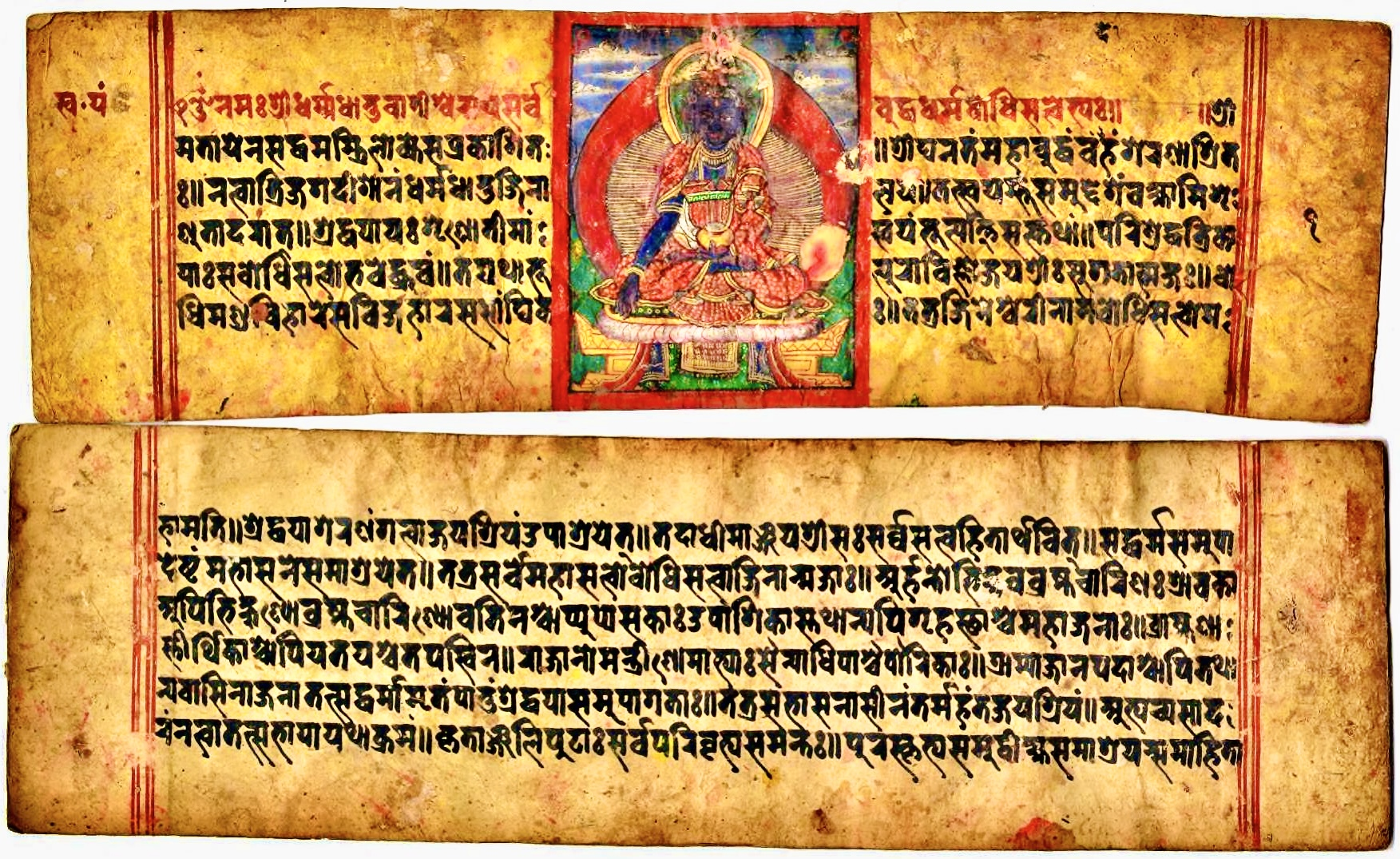
- A 1884 CE manuscript of Svayambhu Purana.

Information
- Religion: Vajrayana Buddhism
- Author: Nepalese Buddhists
- Language: Sanskrit
- Period: 1558 CE
- Chapters: 10
- Verses: 1,749

Swayambhu Purana (Sanskrit: स्वयम्भू पुराण, Svayambhū Purāṇa) is a Sanskrit Buddhist text about the origin and development of the Kathmandu Valley. Swayambhu Purana gives details of all the Buddhas who came to Kathmandu. It also provides information about the first and the second Buddhas in Buddhism.

== Dating ==
According to historian Dilli Raman Regmi and Kamal P. Malla, the oldest extant manuscript of the Svayambhu Purana dates to 1558 CE (678 N.S.), in the mid-sixteenth century CE.

== Contents ==
=== First Chapter ===
Jina Sri Raja Bodhisattva had asked Jayaśrī about the origin of the Svayambhu; the description of the origin as told by Upagupta Bhikshu to Ashoka has been narrated in the first chapter of the story of the origin of the Svayambhu.

It also gives an account of the prophecy made by Sri Shakyamuni Bhagavan to Maitreya Bodhisattva about the origin of the Svayambhu in the middle of the lotus with one thousand petals planted by Bipashvi Tathagata. At the time of Bipashvi, Sri Shakyamuni was famous by the name of Satyadharma Bodhisattva. In this chapter also shows the then Kathmandu valley was a big lake inhabited by Nagas (snakes).

=== Second Chapter ===
In the second chapter, as a reply to the question of Maitreya Bodhisattva, "When did the Svayambhu come into being over the lotus planted by Bipashvi Tathagata?” Shakyamuni Bhagavan replied that Svayambhu originated at the time of Shikhi Tathagata, when he was known as Kshemankara Bodhisattva. That chapter also gives a description of the fruits blessing due to worship of the Svayambhu.

=== Third Chapter ===
In the third chapter, Maitreya asks the Buddha, "When was the city made by clearing up the water of the lake in which by Nagas resided?" Thereupon Shakyamuni Bhagavan replied, "When I was known as Parvataksha at the time of Vishvabhu Tathagata, a person by the name of Manju Devacharya cleared up the water by destroying the forests of Kuruva, Chabaha, Suryaghata and Gokarna and established a city, made Dharmakara its king and made the city famous as Manjupattana".

=== Fourth Chapter ===
Maitreya the Bodhisattva asks Shakyamuni Bhagavan about the creation of the places of pilgrimage after the founding of the city of Nepal in the fourth chapter. Then after Shakyamuni Bhagavan explained, "Oh Maitreya! At the time when a human being had a life of forty thousand years, I was living as Jyotipala Bodhisattva in the city called Kshemavati at Krakuchhanda Tathagata's place, at the time when Sri Krakuchhanda Bhagavan went to visit Sri Svayambhu". Then he narrated to his community and to the people in general about the origin of the holy pilgrimages to Bhagavati and Keshavati.

=== Fifth Chapter ===
The fifth chapter provides:

- The story of Manilingeshvara Manichuda, the image of Maitreya Bodhisattva on the hill of Manichuda.
- The story of the salvation of the prince of Gokarna, Gokarneshvara, the image of Gagangunja at Gokarna.
- The story of the suppression of Kulika, the king of the Nagas, Kileshvara Vaitaraga, the image of Samantabhadra at Changu.
- The story of the salvation of Sarvapala Vaidya, Kumbheshvara Vaitaraga. The image of Vajrapani at Kuvanti.
- The story of Manjugarta, who preferred sweets to learning, Garteshvara, the image of Manjusri at the field of Pampi.
- The story of Omadiyana Acharya, Phankeshvara Vaitaraga, the image of Sarvanivarana Vishkambhi in the lake of Pampi.
- The story of the troubles faced by Omadiyana due to the testing of the skills god Ganesha.
- The story of Omadiyan visualizing the effect of Ashtasiddhi (mastery of eight skills). Vikramayashvara Vaitaraga, the image of Khagarbha Bodhisattva at Adeshvara.

Thus the fifth chapter recounts things about eight Vaitaraga and the story of the salvation of the snake Takshaka at Punya Tirtha, a pilgrimage at Gokarna; the story of the salvation of Shiva and Parvati at Gokarna; the story of the salvation of Shiva and Parvati at Shanta Tirtha, a pilgrimage at Guheshvari, the story of the salvation of the shepherd Gopala by name at Shankara Tirtha, a pilgrimage at Sangama; the story of the salvation of the gambler Dinachuda at Nidhana Tirtha, a pilgrimage at Laksha Tirtha; the story of the salvation of the ignorant king called Sindhu at Jnana Tirtha, a pilgrimage at the Karha river; the story of the salvation of Koti Karna Sharthabaha, who showed impudence and disobeyed his own mother, at Chintamani Tirtha, a pilgrimage at Teku Dobhana, the story of the salvation of the demon Danasura at Danaga; the story of the salvation of the wicked king, the minister, and the sons of the merchant of the country of Gauda at Sulakshana Tirtha, a pilgrimage at Bhajanga, and the story of the salvation of the demon, the wife of Danasura, at Jaya Tirhta, a pilgrimage at Nekhu.

=== Sixth Chapter ===
The sixth chapter incorporates accounts of the coming of Dharma Sri Mitra to Nepal to comprehend the meaning of the twelve alphabets mentioned in Namasangiti and the accounts of his being king of Nepal, and how Sri Svayambhu was made famous by the name of Dharma Dhatu Vagishvara.

=== Seventh Chapter ===
The seventh chapter gives an account of how the gods including Indra erected a stupa as a fulfillment of the wish of Shanti Karacharya to cover up Dharma Dhatu Vagishvara to make a bowl shaped diya over it, and also provides accounts of the establishment of the image of gods including Bashapura, after invoking them.

=== Eighth Chapter ===
The eighth chapter describes the prophecy of Bhagavan as to how the Nepal Valley will face drought for seven years and how Gunakama Deva, as instructed by Shanti Karacharya, made the rain fall by bringing Karkotaka, the king of the snakes.

=== Ninth Chapter ===
The ninth chapter comprises the prophecy of Bhagavan as to how the twelve-year-long drought would be put to an end, to Bandhu Datta, the pupil Shanti Karacharya, King Narendra Deva and Lalita, a farmer serving the king, by bringing Lokanatha (the Lord of the World) from Kamaru Kamaksha; it also provides the name of twenty-one Upatirthas.

=== Tenth Chapter ===
In tenth chapter are the story about the Chuda Bikshuni and the highlights about the rules of telling and listening to the Svayambhu Purana, and also the blessing one gets for telling, retelling, listening, making others listen, writing it or making others write it.

== See also ==
- Pashupati Purana
- Pragya Paramita
