= Dharma Man Tuladhar =

Nepalese businessman and Buddhist philanthropist

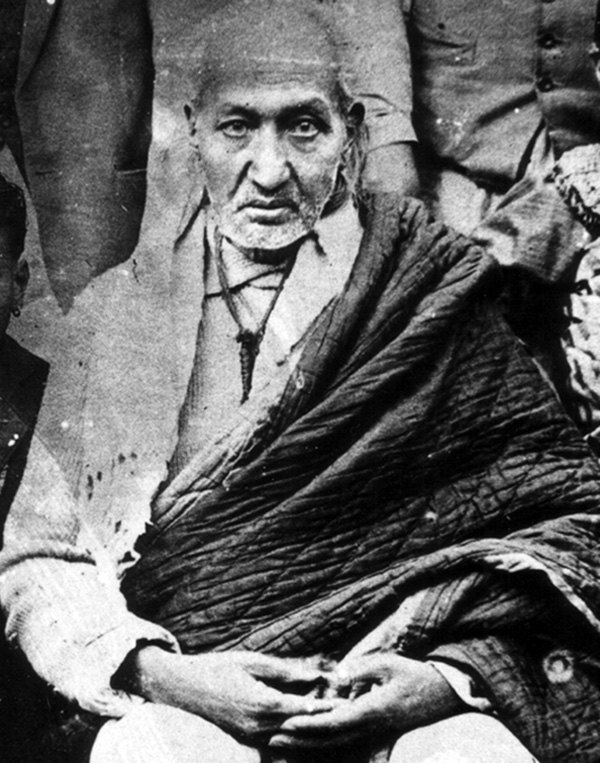
Dharma Man Tuladhar in 1935

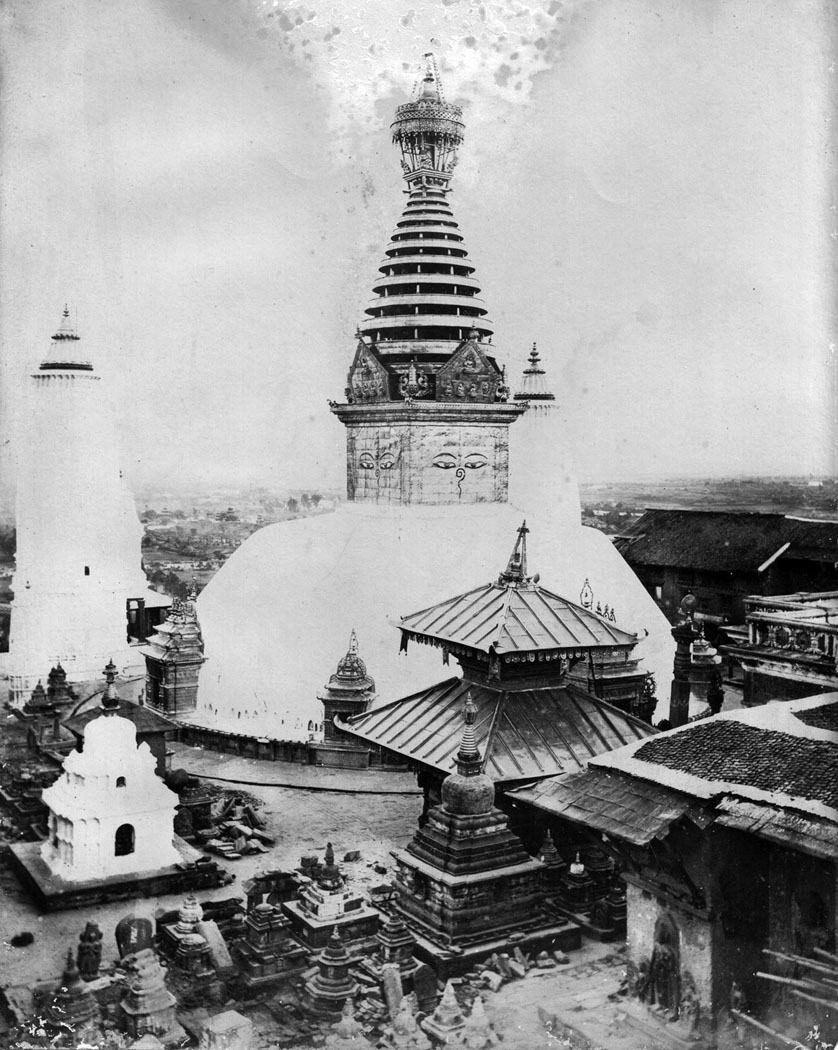
Swayambhu stupa in Kathmandu shortly after renovation, circa 1920.

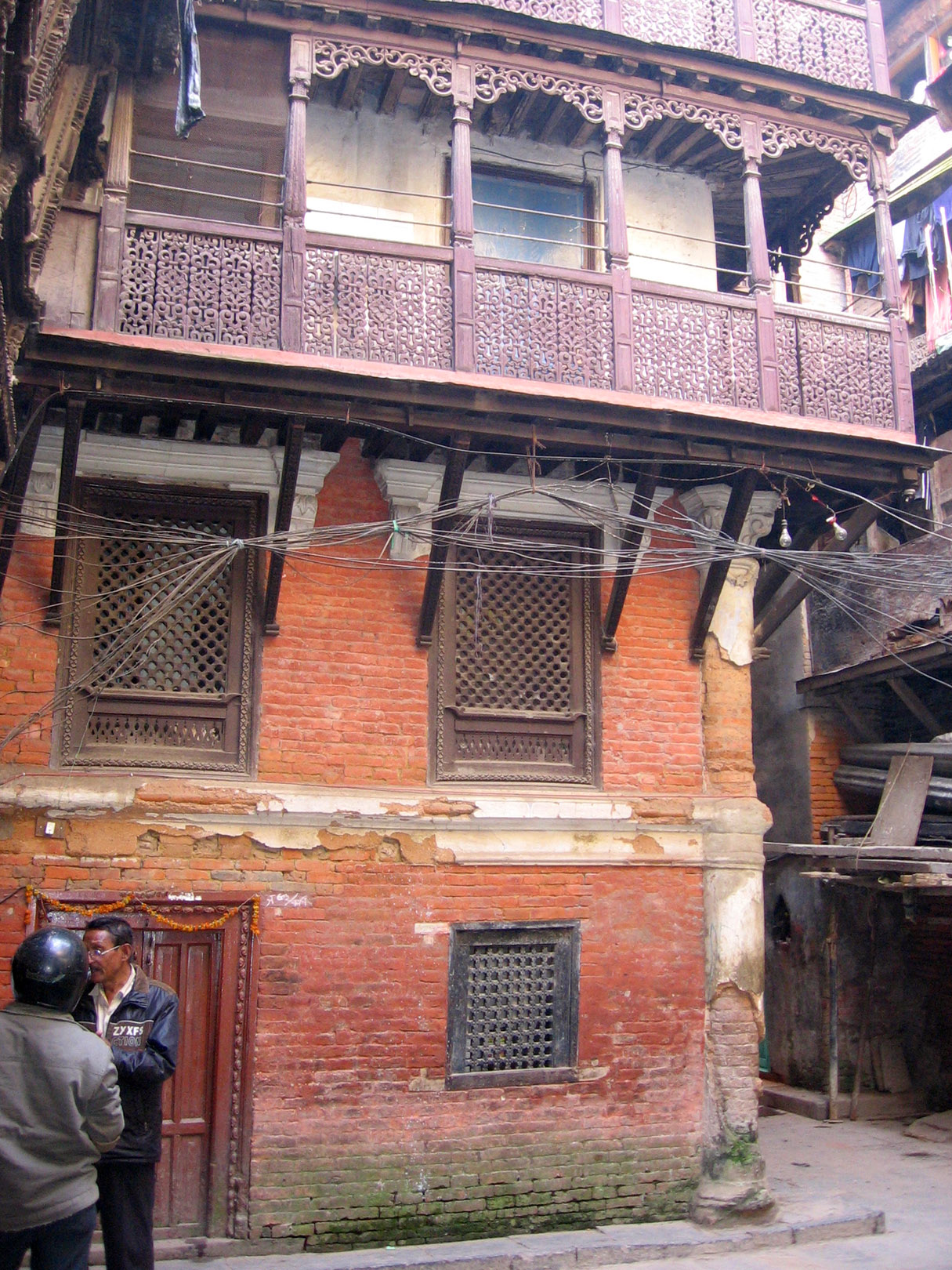
Dharma Man Tuladhar's house at Tanlachhi, Kathmandu.

Dharma Man Tuladhar (Nepali: धर्ममान तुलाधर) (August 4, 1862 – August 24, 1938) was a Nepalese trader and philanthropist best known for the renovation of the Swayambhu stupa in Kathmandu, one of the holiest Buddhist shrines in Nepal.

Popularly known as Dhaman Sahu (Newar: धमां साहु), Tuladhar headed the restoration project which lasted from 1918 to 1921. This was the last complete renovation of Swayambhu before the recent restoration project which was finished in 2010.

== Business in Tibet ==
Tuladhar belonged to the Nyata (Newar: न्यत) branch of Tuladhars. He was born in Nyata in the western part of Kathmandu and moved to Tanlachhi (Newar: तंलाछि) in the early 1900s. His wife was Hera Laxmi Tuladhar. His father Buddha Bir Singh Tuladhar owned a business house in Lhasa, Tibet known as Chhusingsyar with branches in Gyantse and Phari and in Ladakh and Kolkata in India. Tuladhar traveled to Lhasa and lived there many years engaged as a trader.

Following his return to Kathmandu in 1898, he devoted himself to supporting Buddhist causes. He also hosted Tibetan lamas coming to Kathmandu on pilgrimage and made arrangements for them to give religious discourses, most notably Kyangtse Lama who arrived in Kathmandu in 1924.

== Restoration of Swayambhu ==
A Tibetan lama Sarvasri (Tokden) Sakyasri provided the inspiration to undertake the restoration of Swayambhu which Tuladhar began in 1918 after obtaining permission from the king and the prime minister. Tuladhar was one of the major donors to the project. Lamas and devotees from Nepal, Tibet, Bhutan and Sikkim also made large contributions.

The entire stupa was refurbished. The spire was dismantled and redone. The central shaft was renewed. Tuladhar sponsored the renovation of the upper portion of the stupa while brothers Harsha Sundar, Ram Sundar and Pushpa Sundar Tuladhar of Asan Dhalasikwa, Kathmandu bore the expenses of the nine shrines around its base.

The five Buddha shrines set into the dome were covered with gilt copper, a new statue of Vairocana Buddha was installed, and four new shrines were built to house statues of Tara. A row of prayer wheels were also installed all around the stupa.

The chief engineer of the project was Jogbir Sthapit. The restoration lasted three years. Newar Buddhist priests and Tibetan lamas conducted separate religious ceremonies at Swayambhu before work began and after it was completed.

== Renovation of Kindo Baha ==
In 1926, Tuladhar sponsored the renovation of Kindo Baha, a 17th-century monastic courtyard located at the foot of Swayambhu hill, which was in near ruins. The monastery became a major center of Theravada Buddhism in the subsequent years. The movement to revive Theravada Buddhism in Nepal began here. The government cracked down by expelling the resident monks out of the country.

== Imprisonment ==
Tuladhar's contribution to the revival of Theravada Buddhism angered the government. In 1931, he was fined with 11 other people including Buddhist teacher Dhammalok Mahasthavir and poets Chittadhar Hridaya and Yogbir Singh Kansakar for spreading an "unorthodox religion".

== Legacy ==
Dharma Man Tuladhar died at his home in Kathmandu in 1938. A stone stupa dedicated to his memory was built and consecrated in 1941 on the east side of the Shantipur Temple at Swayambhu.

== See also ==
- Buddhism in Nepal
- Lhasa Newar (trans-Himalayan traders)
