= Phari =

Phari Pagri
- Town
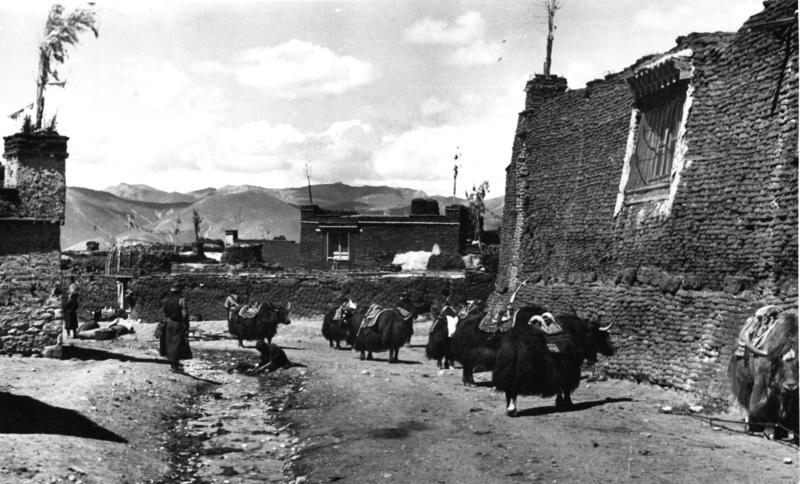

- Location in the Tibet Autonomous Region
- Coordinates: 27°43′06″N 89°09′18″E
- Country: People's Republic of China
- Autonomous region: Tibet Autonomous Region
- Prefecture-level city: Shigatse
- County: Yadong

Population (2004)
  - Total: 2,121
- Time zone: UTC+8 (CST)

Phari or Pagri (Tibetan: ཕག་རི, Wylie: phag ri; Chinese: 帕里镇; pinyin: Pàlǐ Zhèn) is a town in Yadong County in the Tibet Autonomous Region, China near the border with Bhutan. The border can be accessed through a secret road/trail connecting Tsento Gewog in Bhutan (27.698912°N 89.189139°E) known as Tremo La. As of 2004 the town had a population of 2,121. It is one of the highest towns in the world, being about 4,300 m (14,100 ft) above sea-level at the head of the Chumbi Valley.

== History ==
Thomas Manning, the first Englishman to reach Lhasa, visited Pagri from 21 September until 5 November 1811 and had this to say about his room in the town: "Dirt, dirt, grease, smoke. Misery, but good mutton." The Pagri Fortress (Dzong) was located here and was important for the government as it stood between Tibet and Bhutan. Pagri was a staging area en route to Gyantse and ultimately Lhasa.

Thubten Ngodup, the current Nechung Oracle, was born in Phari in 1957.

== Gallery ==
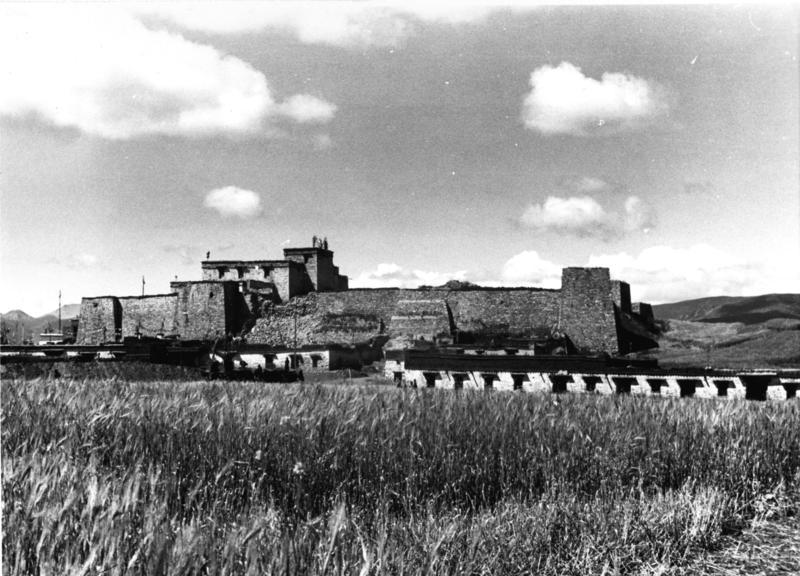

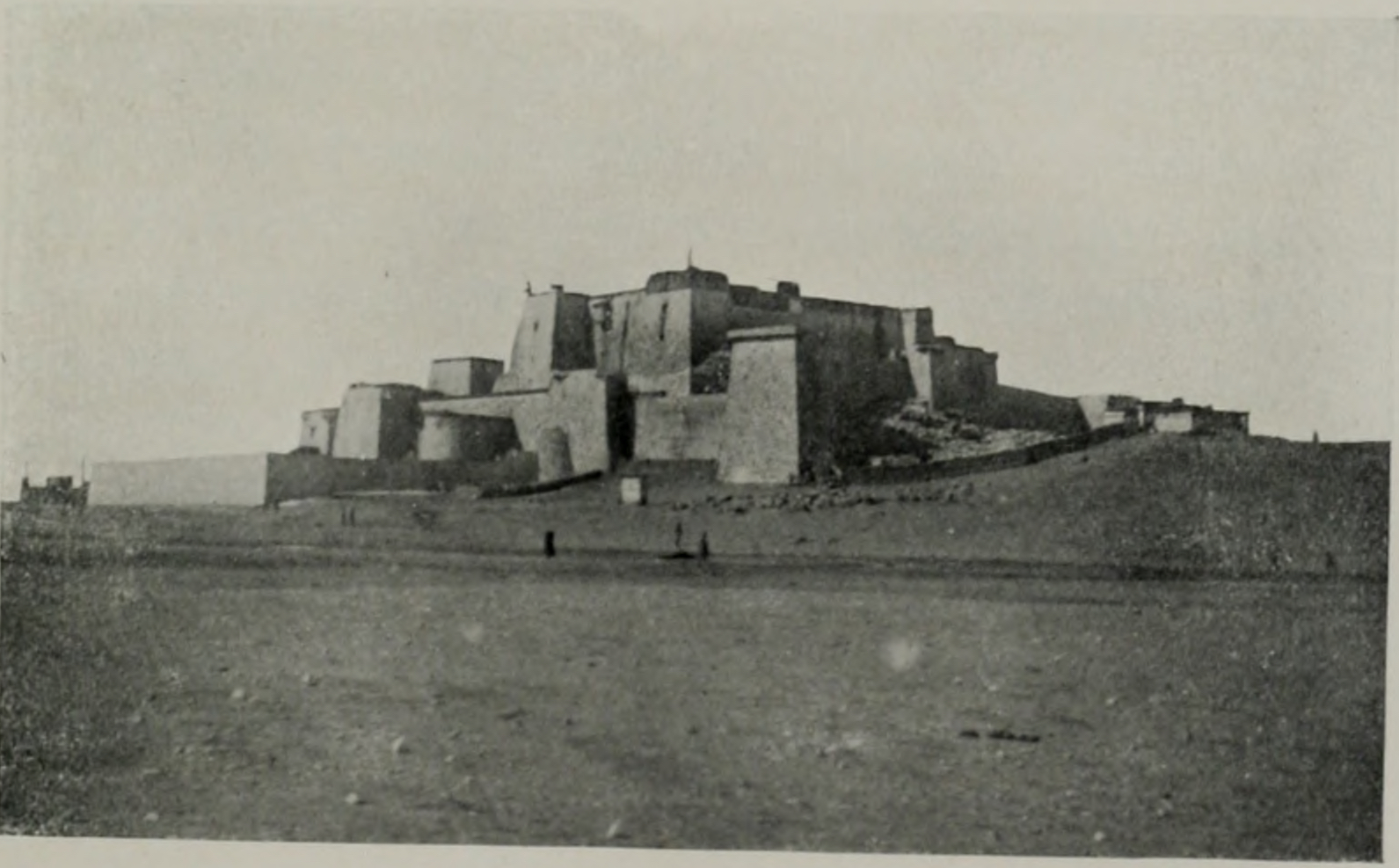
Phari Dzong in 1903 during British Younghusband invasion of Tibet

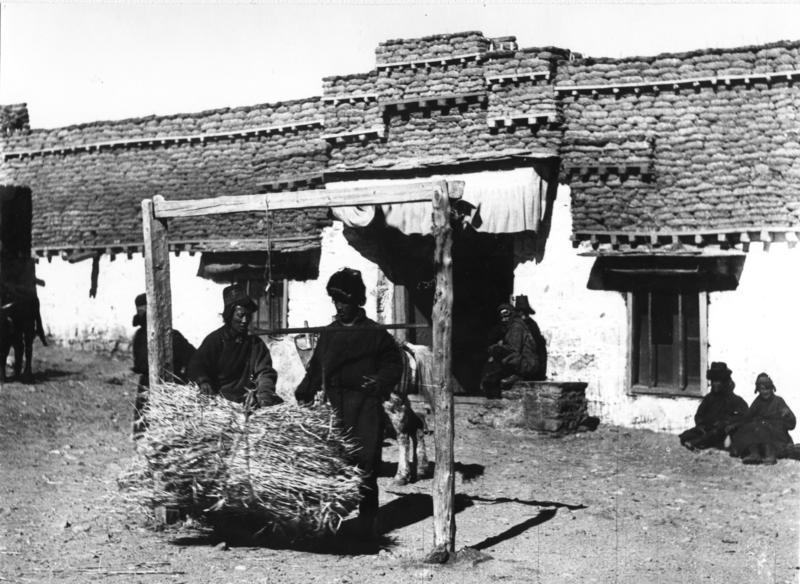
Phari Dzong, 1938

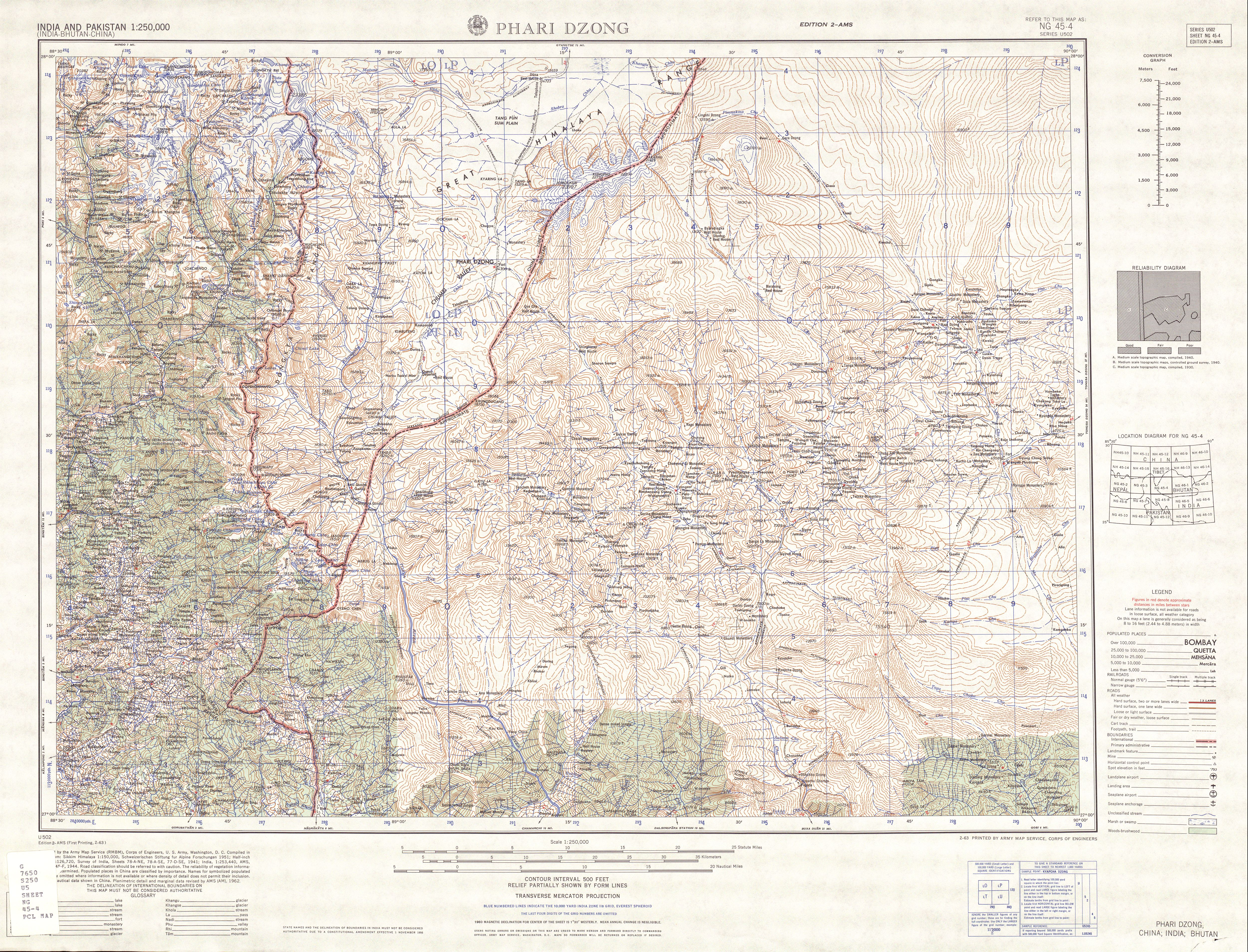
"Phari Dzong" sheet- topographic map printed by the US Army Map Service, Corps of Engineers, February, 1963

== Climate ==
Owing to its extreme altitude, Pagri has an alpine climate (Köppen ETH) that is too cold to permit the growth of trees, even though the altitude is still marginally too low for the formation of permafrost. Example Mount Fuji in Japan, Uelen in Russia and Longyearbyen in Svalbard Norway. The winter is severe in spite of the fact that no month has daytime maxima below 0 °C (32 °F), and also very dry and long, extending as late as May. Snowfall, however, is rare because of the dryness. Summers, during which the great majority of precipitation occurs, are cool even at their warmest and consistently damp, even though the Himalayas prevent falls from ever being heavy.

Climate data for Phari, elevation 4,300 m (14,100 ft), (1991–2020 normals, extremes 1971–2020)
Month	Jan	Feb	Mar	Apr	May	Jun	Jul	Aug	Sep	Oct	Nov	Dec	Year
Record high °C (°F)	15.8 (60.4)	15.0 (59.0)	16.4 (61.5)	16.6 (61.9)	17.7 (63.9)	18.7 (65.7)	18.6 (65.5)	19.4 (66.9)	16.8 (62.2)	16.8 (62.2)	16.4 (61.5)	15.5 (59.9)	19.4 (66.9)
Mean daily maximum °C (°F)	1.5 (34.7)	2.2 (36.0)	4.5 (40.1)	7.2 (45.0)	9.8 (49.6)	12.5 (54.5)	13.0 (55.4)	12.8 (55.0)	11.7 (53.1)	8.5 (47.3)	6.3 (43.3)	4.1 (39.4)	7.8 (46.1)
Daily mean °C (°F)	−8.2 (17.2)	−6.6 (20.1)	−3.1 (26.4)	0.4 (32.7)	3.7 (38.7)	7.3 (45.1)	8.4 (47.1)	8.0 (46.4)	6.2 (43.2)	1.3 (34.3)	−3.3 (26.1)	−6.4 (20.5)	0.6 (33.2)
Mean daily minimum °C (°F)	−16.8 (1.8)	−14.6 (5.7)	−9.6 (14.7)	−4.8 (23.4)	−0.8 (30.6)	3.7 (38.7)	5.2 (41.4)	4.7 (40.5)	2.5 (36.5)	−4.2 (24.4)	−10.7 (12.7)	−15.0 (5.0)	−5.0 (23.0)
Record low °C (°F)	−28.7 (−19.7)	−28.4 (−19.1)	−29.8 (−21.6)	−20.2 (−4.4)	−12.5 (9.5)	−5.7 (21.7)	−1.4 (29.5)	−2.1 (28.2)	−6.5 (20.3)	−21.5 (−6.7)	−26.2 (−15.2)	−27.4 (−17.3)	−29.8 (−21.6)
Average precipitation mm (inches)	6.2 (0.24)	10.8 (0.43)	24.1 (0.95)	28.8 (1.13)	39.8 (1.57)	49.4 (1.94)	101.1 (3.98)	99.8 (3.93)	51.5 (2.03)	20.8 (0.82)	4.2 (0.17)	2.0 (0.08)	438.5 (17.27)
Average precipitation days (≥ 0.1 mm)	3.3	5.2	10.2	12.6	16.1	21.4	27.5	27.1	20.6	7.1	1.5	1.1	153.7
Average snowy days	6.1	8.8	14.0	17.1	12.2	0.9	0.1	0.6	1.2	6.2	3.2	2.9	73.3
Average relative humidity (%)	51	58	64	69	73	77	82	82	80	71	60	48	68
Mean monthly sunshine hours	273.1	251.1	263.5	232.4	207.1	157.1	140.6	153.2	156.5	239.5	271.3	278.9	2,624.3
Percentage possible sunshine	83	79	70	60	49	38	33	38	43	68	85	87	61
Source 1: China Meteorological Administration
Source 2: Weather China
