= List of Mahaviharas of Newar Buddhism =

Newar Buddhist temples in Nepal

Newar Buddhism is one of the branches of Buddhism. One of the major elements of this branch of Buddhism is Mahavihara (महाबिहार) or Baha or great monastery. These monasteries have served as centers of learning in Newar Buddhism. These monasteries generally are built as a courtyard surrounded by two storied buildings consisting of halls. Some of these monasteries have been founded as early as fifth to twelfth century Many of these mahaviharas are listed as historical monuments of Nepal. The following is a list of these mahaviharas -

Mahavihara (Sanskrit)	Nepal Bhasa name	Location	Founded	Remarks
Maitripura Mahavihara	Kwa Baha (Kwatha Baha)	Kathmandu Thamel		Built by Bakbajra who brought Kashisoyambhu (Shreegha Vihar) from Kashi
Henakara Mahavihara	Dhwaka Baha	Kathmandu	7th century	Damaged in earthquake of 1934
Hemvarna Mahavihara	Gan Baha	Kathmandu		
Ratnaketu Mahavihara	Nhu Baha	Kathmandu		
Ratnachaitya Mahavihara	Jhwa Baha	Kathmandu		
Gunakar Mahavihara	Chusya Baha	Kathmandu		
Suratshree Mahavihara	Takshe Baha	Kathmandu		
Kanakachaitya Mahavihara	Jana Baha	Kathmandu		Annual festival held
Keshchandra Paravarta Mahavihara	Itum Baha	Kathmandu	1381	Known for Keshchandra and Gurumapa (Official Website)
Ratnakirti Mahavihara	Makhan Baha	Kathmandu		
Mulashree Mahavihara	Mu baha	Kathmandu		
Mantrasiddhi Mahavihara	Sawal Baha	Kathmandu		
Rajakirti Mahavihara	Te Baha	South of New Road, Kathmandu	5th century AD	
Shreekhanda Mahavihara	Shikhamu Baha	Kathmandu		
Brahmachakra Mahavihara	Om Baha	Kathmandu		
Bajrasheel Mahavihara	Iku Baha	Kathmandu		
Munisangha Mahavihara	Mikha Baha	Kathmandu		
Kirtipunya Mahavihara	Lagan Baha	Kathmandu		
Kirtipunya Mahavihara	Kohiti	Kathmandu		
Manisingha Mahavihara	Musun Baha (Inner)	Kathmandu		
Manisangha Mahavihara	Musun Baha (Outer)	Kathmandu		
Vikramashila Mahavihara	Bhagwan Baha	Thanbahil, Kathmandu		Visited by Pandita Atisha Shrijana of Nalanda in 1041, houses Saharsha Prajnaparamita dated 1223 AD
Hiranya Varna Mahavihar	Kwa Baha	Lalitpur	12th century by Bhaskara Deva Verma	Houses Prajnaparamita dated B.S.1282 (A.D. 1226-1227)
Rudravarna Mahavihara	Uku Baha	Lalitpur	6th century CE by Shiva Deva	
Ratnakar Mahavihara	Ha Bahal	Lalitpur		
Yasodhar Mahavihara	Bu Bahal	Lalitpur		
Jyesthavarna Mahavihara	Tanga Baha (Chaku Baha)	Lalitpur		Contains an inscription dated N.S. 245 (1125 A.D.)
Dharmakirti Mahavihara	Ta Baha	Lalitpur		
Dattanama Mahavihara	Dau Baha	Lalitpur		
Yempi Mahavihara	I Baha	Lalitpur		
Gunalakshmi Mahavihara	Dhum Baha	Lalitpur		
Chakravarna Mahavihara	Cuka Baha	Lalitpur		Founded by Manadeva I
Bajrakirti Mahavihara	Wam Baha	Lalitpur		Inscription dates back to N.S.561 (1441A.D)
Rudradeva Mahavihara		Lalitpur		
Vaishra Varna Mahavihara	Guji Baha	Lalitpur		Housed a manuscript dated N.S. 373 (1253 A.D.)
Mayuravarna Mahavihara	Bhinche Baha	Lalitpur		
Jayamanohara Mahavihara	Su Baha	Lalitpur		
Sri Vaccha Mahavihara	Si Baha	Lalitpur		Houses a Pancharaksa manuscript dated N.S. 509 (1389 A.D)
Baladhar Mahavihara		Lalitpur		
Akshyashwara Mahavihara	Thuthu Bahi	Lalitpur		
Raksheshwara Mahavihara	Kothu Bahi	Lalitpur		
Lokkirti Mahavihara	Na(Naka) Bahi	Lalitpur		
Napichandra Mahavihara	Duntu Bahi	Lalitpur		
Gopichandra Mahavihara	Pintu Bahi	Lalitpur		
Lalitchandra Mahavihara		Lalitpur		
Saptapur Mahavihara	Chika Bahi	Lalitpur		
Padmoccha Mahavihara		Lalitpur		
Rajashree Mahavihara		Lalitpur		
Manimandap Mahavihara	Dhapaga Bahi	Lalitpur		
Chandrasurya Mahavihara		Lalitpur		
Jayashree Mahavihara		Lalitpur		
Gustala Mahavihara	Guita Tole	Lalitpur		
Lokkirti Mahavihara	Kinu Bahi	Lalitpur		
Thaveer Patra Mahavihara		Lalitpur		
Kamukanama Mahavihara	Khwayebahi	Lalitpur		
Itiraja Mahavihara	Ilyaa Bahi	Lalitpur		
Basuraja Mahavihara		Lalitpur		
Indravarna Mahavihara	Inacho	Bhaktapur		
Jetvarna Mahavihara		Bhaktapur		
Manjuvarna Mahavihar	Bekhal Tole	Bhaktapur		
Nritya Mandala Mahavihara		Portland, OR, USA	2009	

== See also ==
- Buddhism in Nepal
- Newar Buddhism
- Kindo Baha
- Pranidhipurna Mahavihar
- Buddhist pilgrimage sites in Nepal
- List of Buddhist stotras in Nepalbhasha
- List of monasteries in Nepal
- List of stupas in Nepal
- Bahal, Nepal
