= Bahal, Nepal =

Religious courtyard of Buddhist origin in Nepal

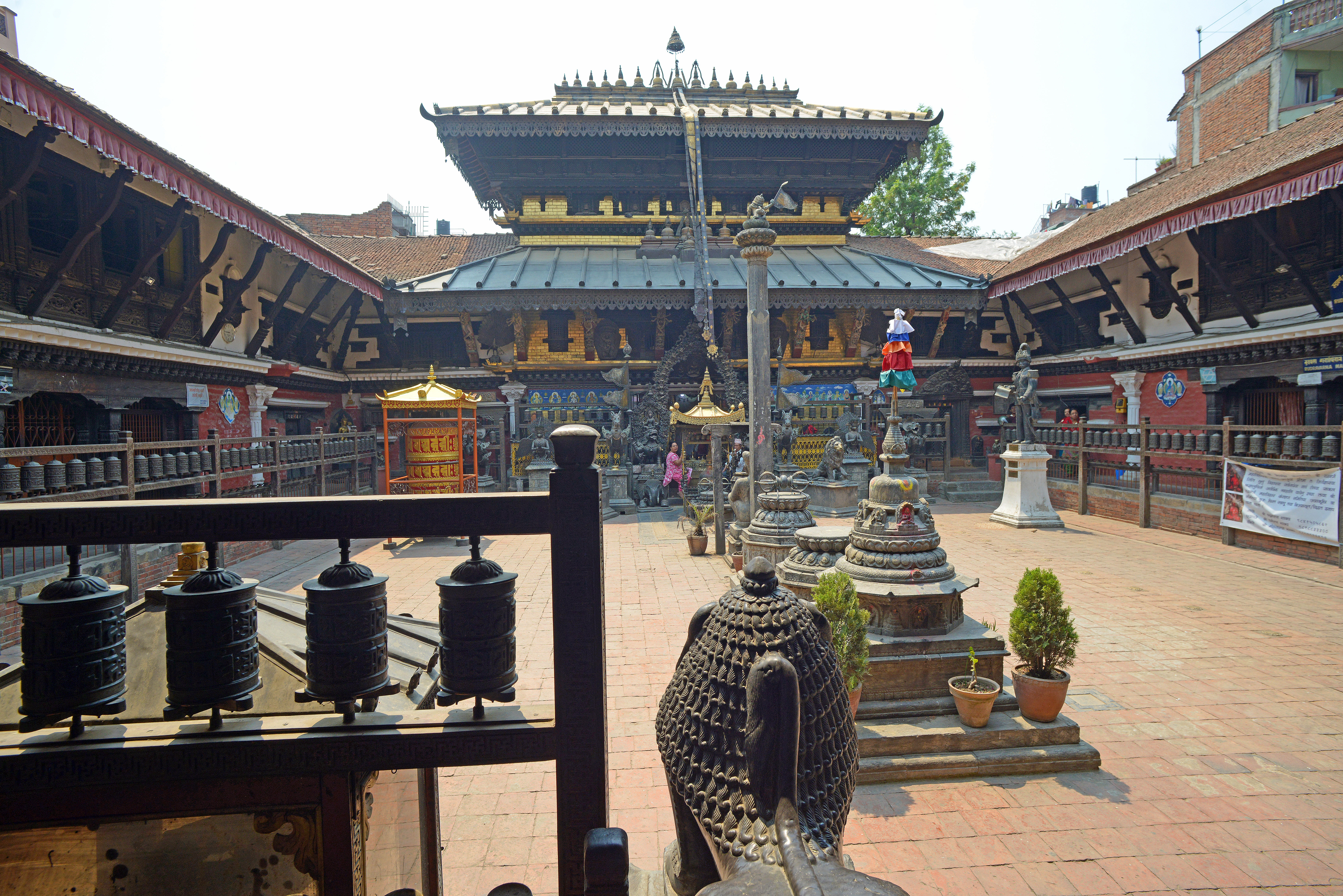
Rudravarna Mahavihar or Uku Bahal - An ancient monastery in Patan, Nepal

Baha (Nepal Bhasa:बहाः) is a type of courtyard found amongst Newar communities in Nepal. It is the most dominant type of courtyard in Newari architecture. Baha is a term for Buddhist monastery and derives its name from the Sanskrit word Bihara, meaning joy or enchantment and thus is a place of religious bliss.

== Characteristics ==
The characteristics of a Baha are:-

- A square or rectangular space bounded by buildings in all sides
- Surrounding buildings built on a raised platform called Falcha
- Ground paved with brick or stone
- Generally centrally placed Chaitya
- Often presence of a well
- The building opposite to the main entrance generally houses a Guthi with idols of deities in the ground floor

== Significance ==
The baha are generally constructed by a family and their descendants reside in it for generations. Hence, it is not just a unit of residence but also a unit of kinship. The Guthis of Newars have their basis on Baha. So, they play a great role in maintaining the norms of Newari society and lifestyle.

== Some Baha ==
- Bhagwan Bahal Thabahi (Thamel Tole)
- Makhan baha
- Sabal Baha
- Tacchya Baha
- Te Bahal
- Mu Baha
- Musya Baha
- Nagbahal
- Kwa Baha
- Itum bahal
- Jana bahal (Machhendra baha)
- Om Baha
- Iku Baha
- Kunsha Baha (Kohsha Baha)
- Tukabaha
- Okubaha
- Na Baha

== See also ==
- Buddhism in Nepal
- Kindo Baha
- List of Mahaviharas of Newar Buddhism
- List of monasteries in Nepal
- List of stupas in Nepal
- Newar Buddhism
- Newari Architecture
- Pranidhipurna Mahavihar
