= Nagbahal =

Coordinates: 27.676013°N 85.324185°E

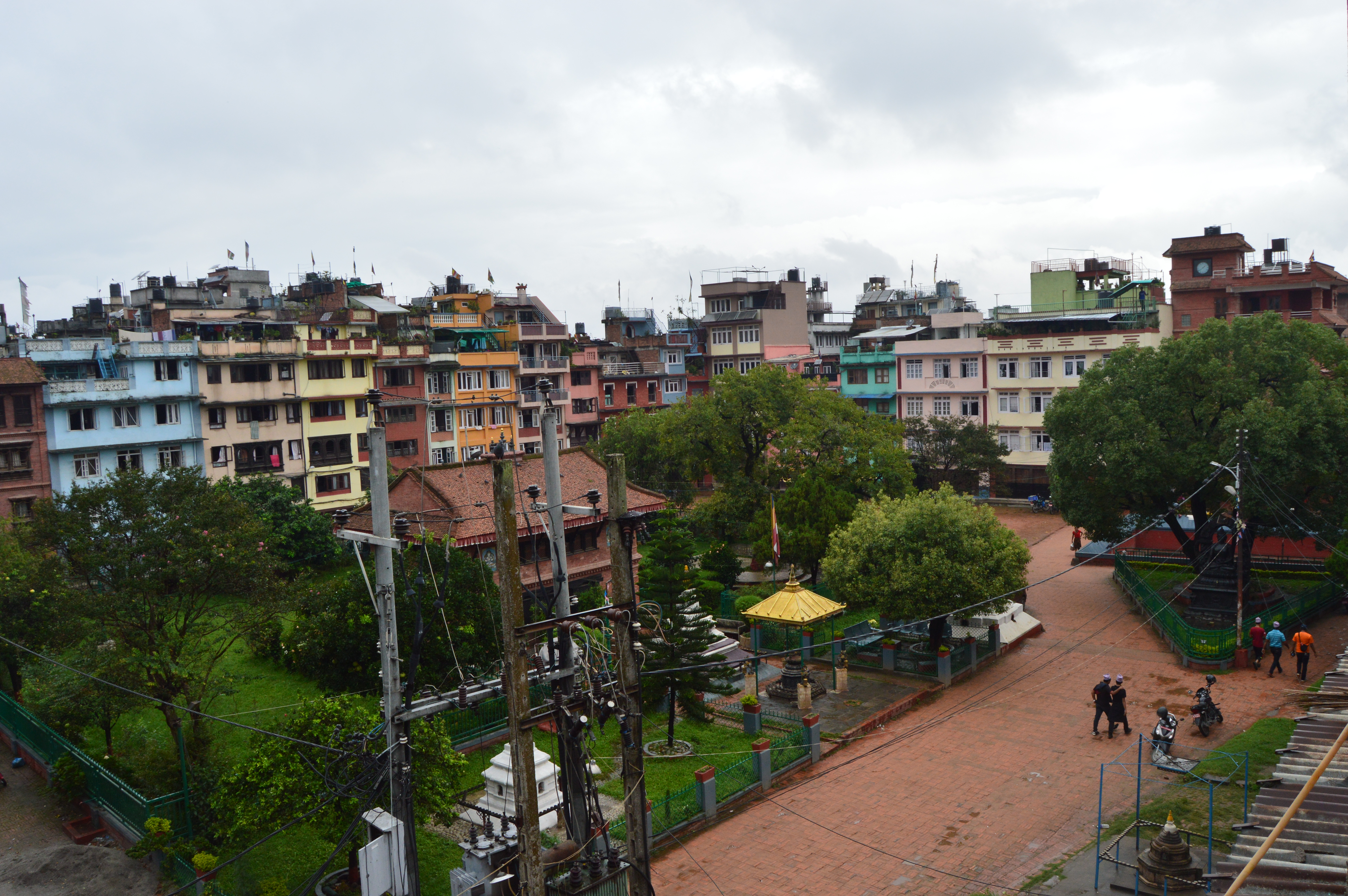
Nagbahal with the Dyalko Bhagwan Temple left of the centre

Nagbahal is located in the heart of the city of Lalitpur in the Kathmandu Valley in Nepal. Nagbahal was originally a Buddhist monastery, but the original buildings are now gone. What is left is a large courtyard or park. In spite of that, this bahal still retains its religious and cultural significance.

Around 5000 people live in the Nagbahal community, mainly from Newar ethnic groups.

== History ==
The history of Nagbahal is not entirely clear. The presence of an 8th-century stele with four Buddhist sculptures on it and two chaityas, likely dating from the Licchavi Kingdom (c.400-750 AD) are an indication of a Buddhist presence in the area at that time.

Many of the residents of the courtyard are Buddhists and affiliated with the sangha of the Hiranya Varna Mahavihar. The Dhakhwa family is one of the families who have been dwelling in Nagbahal since ancient times. Other families include the Shakya, Joshi, Bajracharya, Maharjan, and Napit.

== Temples ==
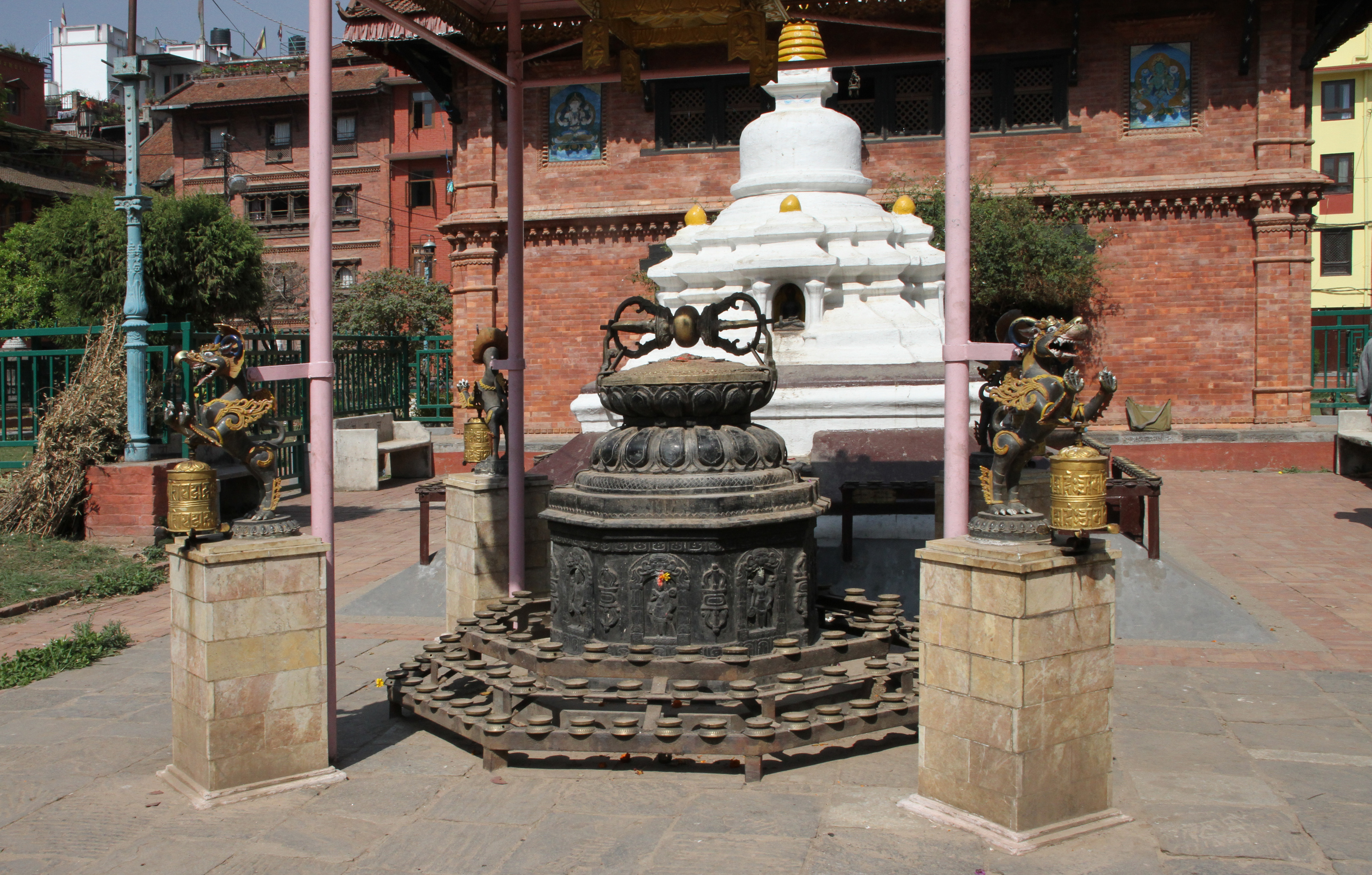
Stupa and vajra in front of the Dyalko Bhagwan Temple

The Dyalko Bhagwan Temple, the main temple of Nagbahal, is located more or less in the centre of the courtyard. It is a relatively new, two storey building in the Newa style of architecture, built like a Nepalese sattal. In the past the building has been used as a Buddhist school. The statue of the deity inside the temple is a Shakyamuni Buddha. A second votive sculpture in the temple is of Mahakala. The maintenance of the temple is in the hands of a guthi.

In front of the entrance to the temple, there are a stupa and a vajra on a pedestal.

Along the south side of the courtyard there is a row of three chaityas, two of which are partly built in the Licchavi style. A total of seven chaityas can be found on the premises.

One of the more prominent secular buildings in Nagbahal is of the Adarsa Saral School, just north of Nagbahal Hiti.

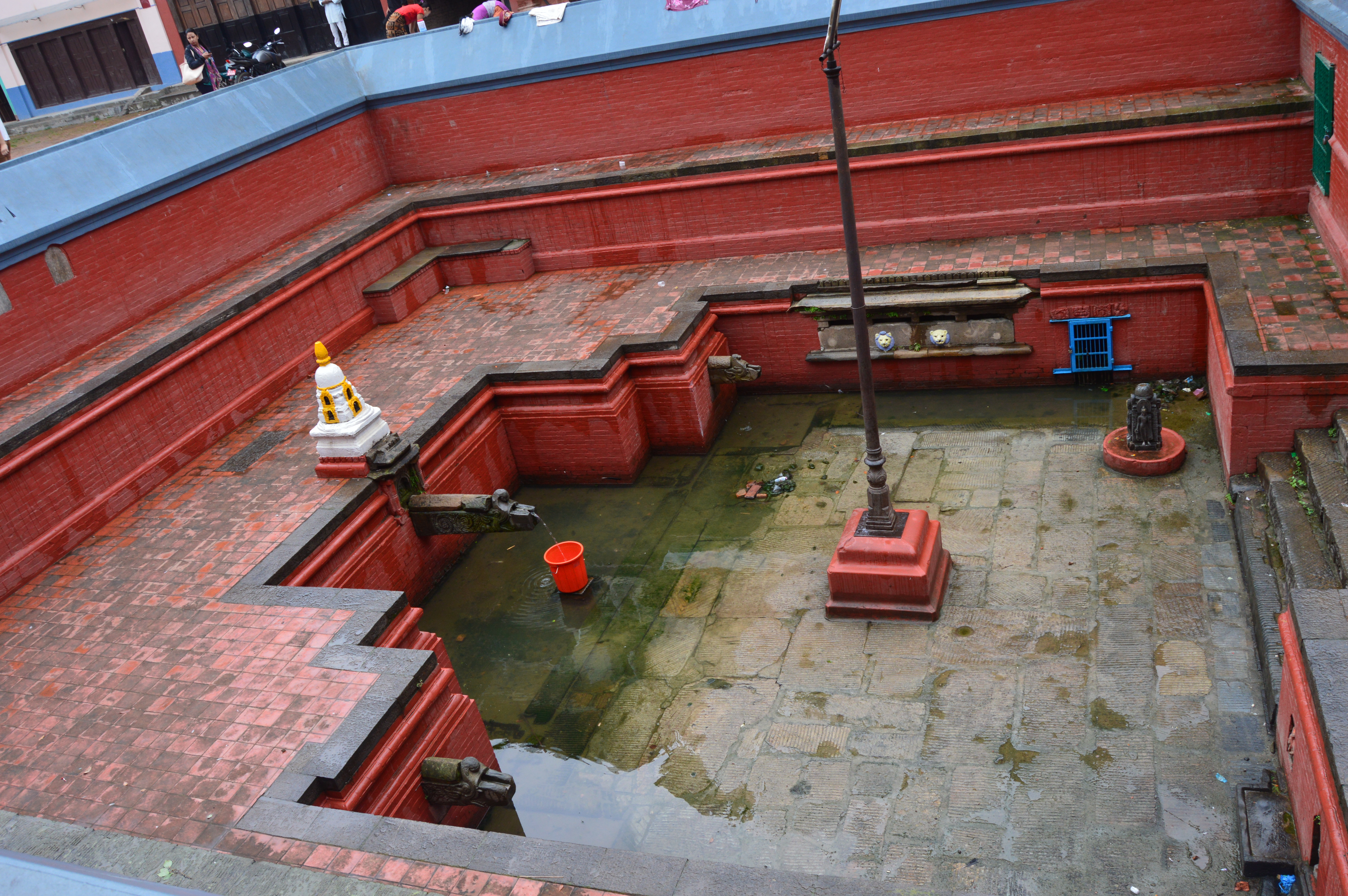
Stone Spout (hiti) at Nag Bahal

== Nagbahal Hiti ==
Another important feature of Nagbahal is a stone spout dating back to the ancient history of Nepal. After having been dry for a considerable time, the Nag Bahal Hiti Rehabilitation project restored the hiti, funded by the US Ambassadors Fund for Cultural Preservation and supported by the Nagbahal Hiti User Group. The works included repairing the inlet and outlet channels of the hiti, while at the same time mapping the channel for future maintenance. Unfortunately, the water has since been contaminated by sewage from a broken sewer line. Only people who do not know this are using the water now.

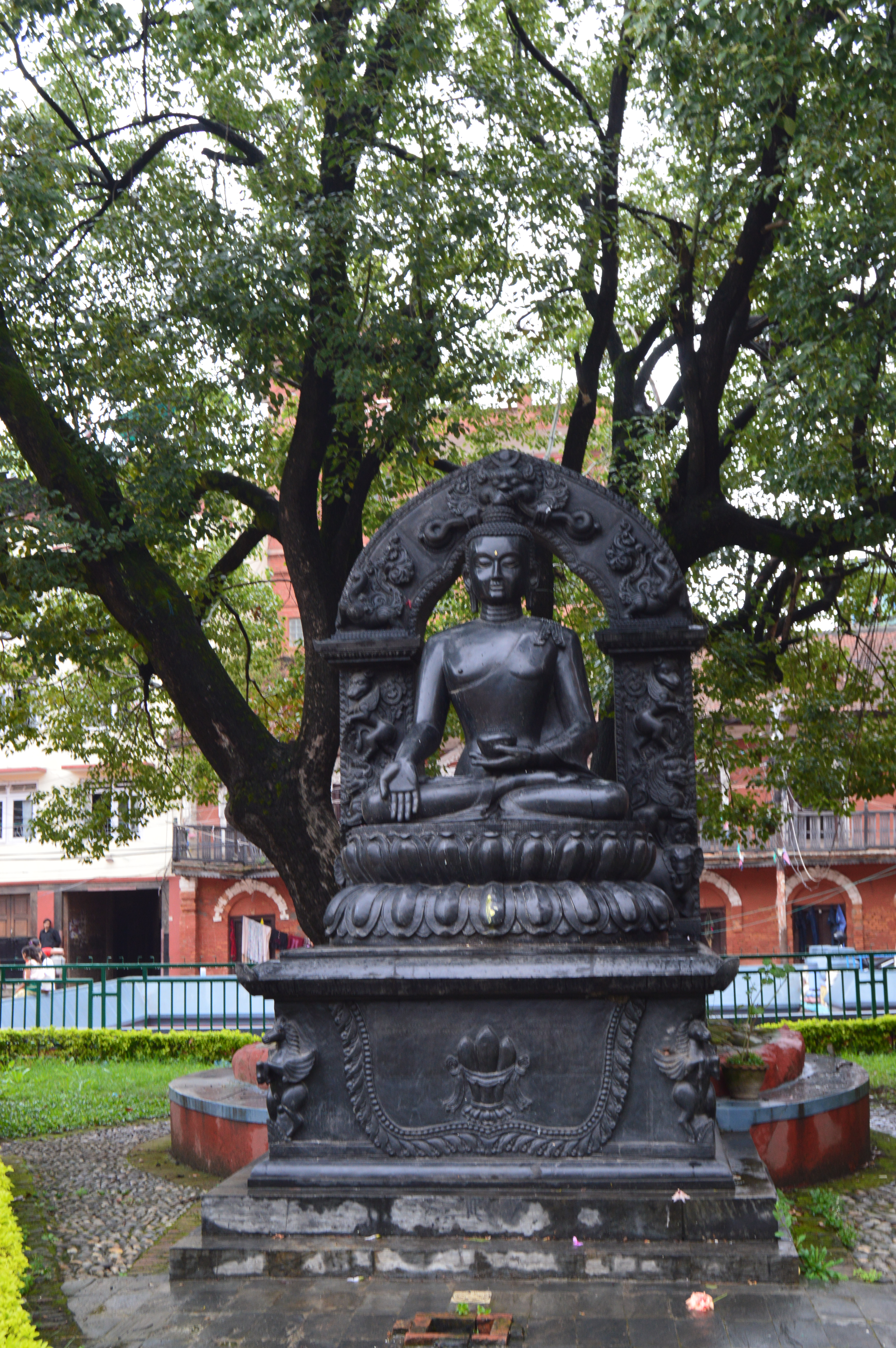
Buddha Statue at Nagbahal

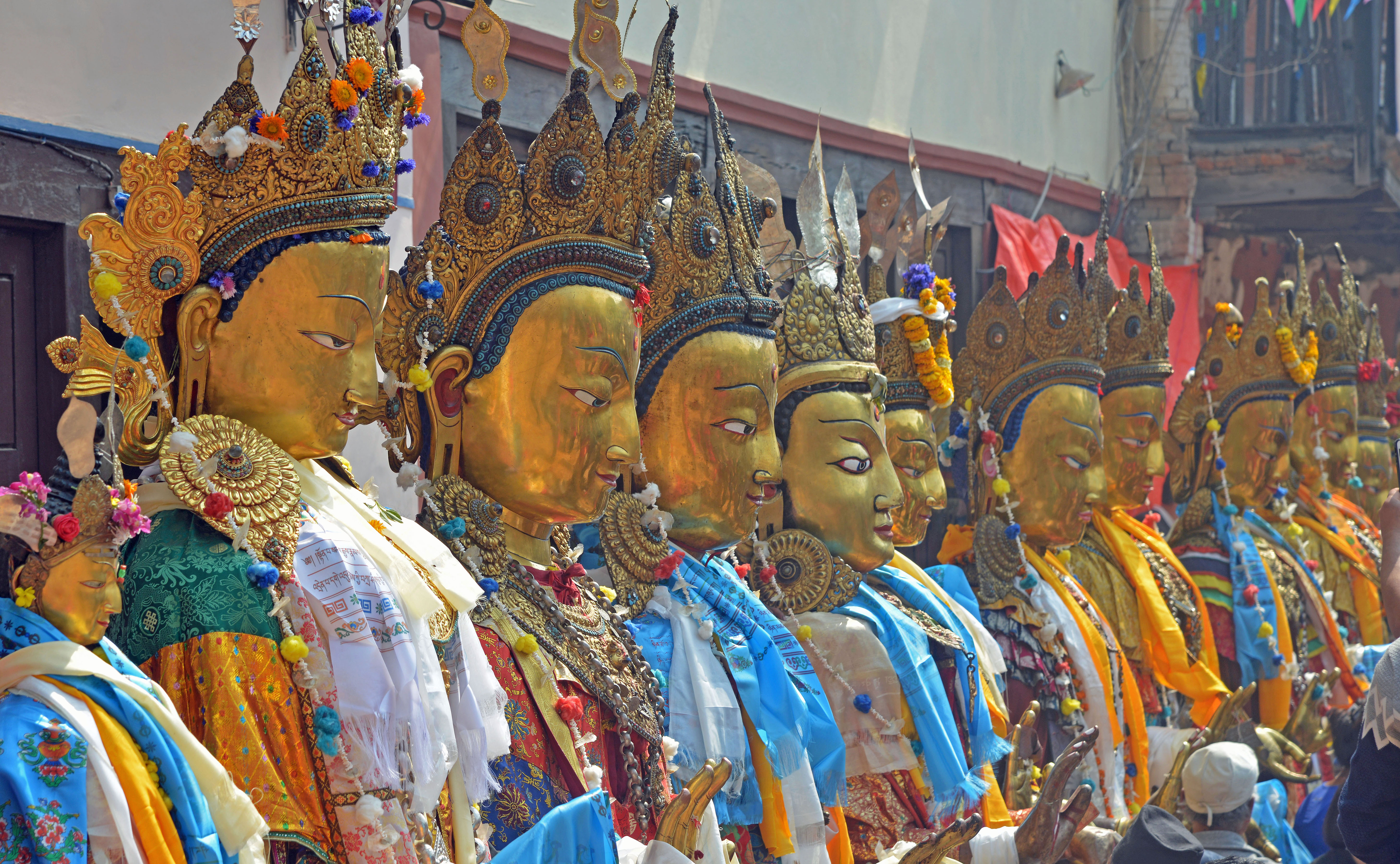
Dīpankara Buddha statues assembled at Nagbahal

== Samyak Mahadan ==
Every five years the Newar Buddhist festival Samyak Mahadan is held for two days at Nagbahal. The festival celebrates Dīpankara Buddha, a Buddha of the past. All images of Dīpankara Buddha are assembled from in and around Patan and carried around on the square to receive offerings from devotees.

Samyak Mahadan is also celebrated in Bhaktapur and Kathmandu, but at different intervals.

== Dipankha Yatra ==
Nagbahal, and especially the sculpture of Neel Thu, The Blue Horned Oxen, is the starting point of the Dipankha Yatra, a 66 kilometres (41 mi) long procession to over a hundred religious sites in the Kathmandu Valley.

== See also ==
- Bahal, Nepal
- Jana bahal
- Kindo Baha
- Kwa Bahal
- Te Bahal
