= Hiranya Varna Mahavihar =

Newar Buddhist temple in Nepal

The Golden Temple Hiranya Varna Mahavihar हिरण्य वर्ण महाविहार क्वबहा:
- Kwa Baha: Golden Temple of Nepal
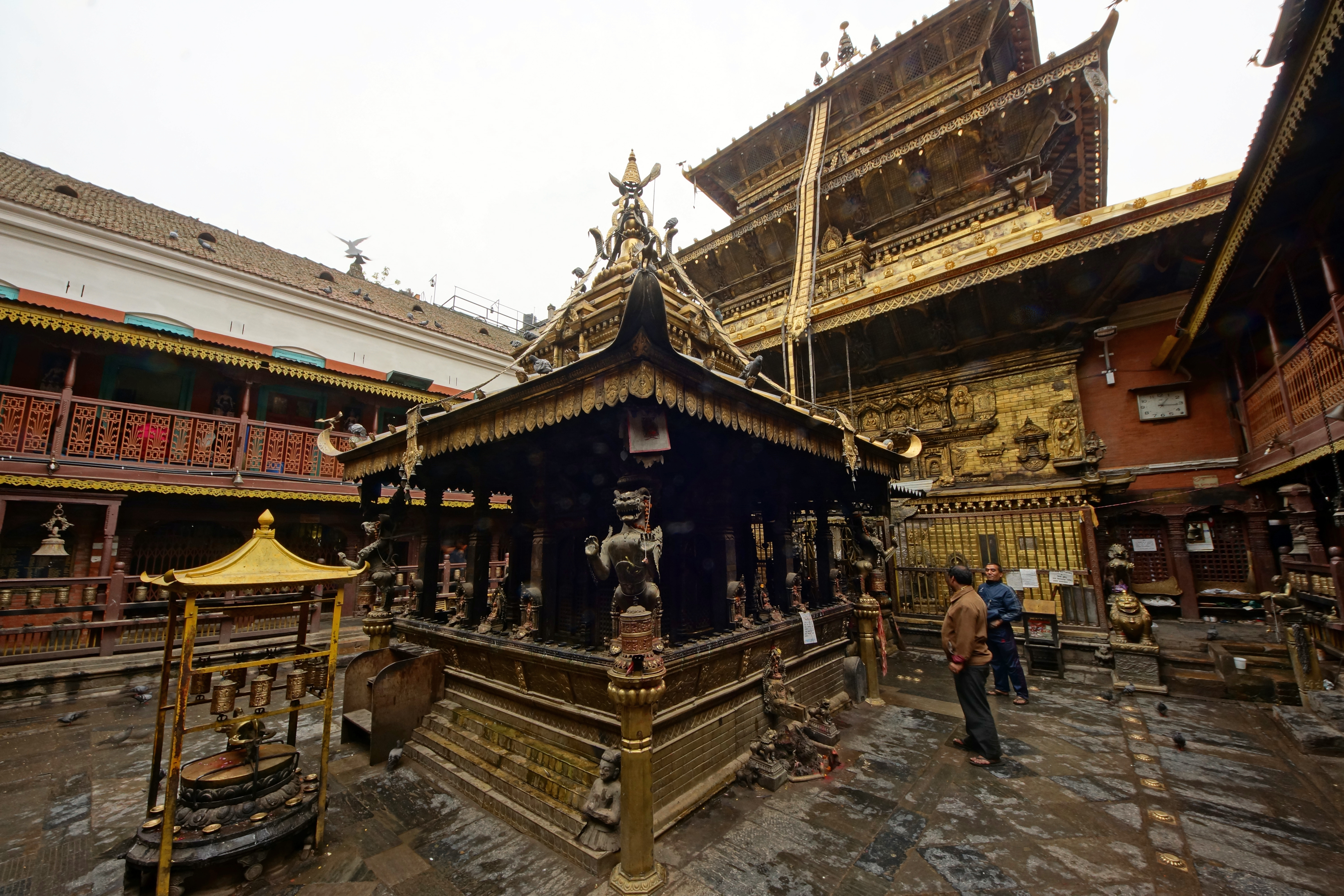
- Hiraṇyavarṇa Mahāvihāra, known as the Golden Temple

Religion
- Affiliation: Newar Buddhism

Location
- Location: Kwalakhu Road, Patan 44600
- Country: Nepal
- Interactive map of The Golden Temple; Hiranya Varna Mahavihar हिरण्य वर्ण महाविहार क्वबहा
- Coordinates: 27°40′31.2″N 85°19′28.8″E

Architecture
- Completed: 1409

Hiraṇyavarṇa Mahāvihāra (Nepali: हिरण्यवर्ण महाविहार), also Kwa Baha: (Nepali: क्वबहा:) informally called The Golden Temple with literal meaning "Gold-colored Great Monastery", is a historical vihara (Buddhist monastery) situated in Patan, Nepal.

== History ==
This golden pagoda of Shakyamuni Buddha was built in the twelfth century by King Bhaskar Varman. Inside the upper storey of the pagoda is the golden image and a large prayer wheel.

According to legend Hiranya Varna Mahavihar was built at a location where a rat chases a cat. Rats were still being fed at the site in 1994, but this may have changed over the years.

The buildings of the courtyard sustained structural damage during the 2015 earthquake. In July 2021 a start was made with the restoration.

== Architecture ==
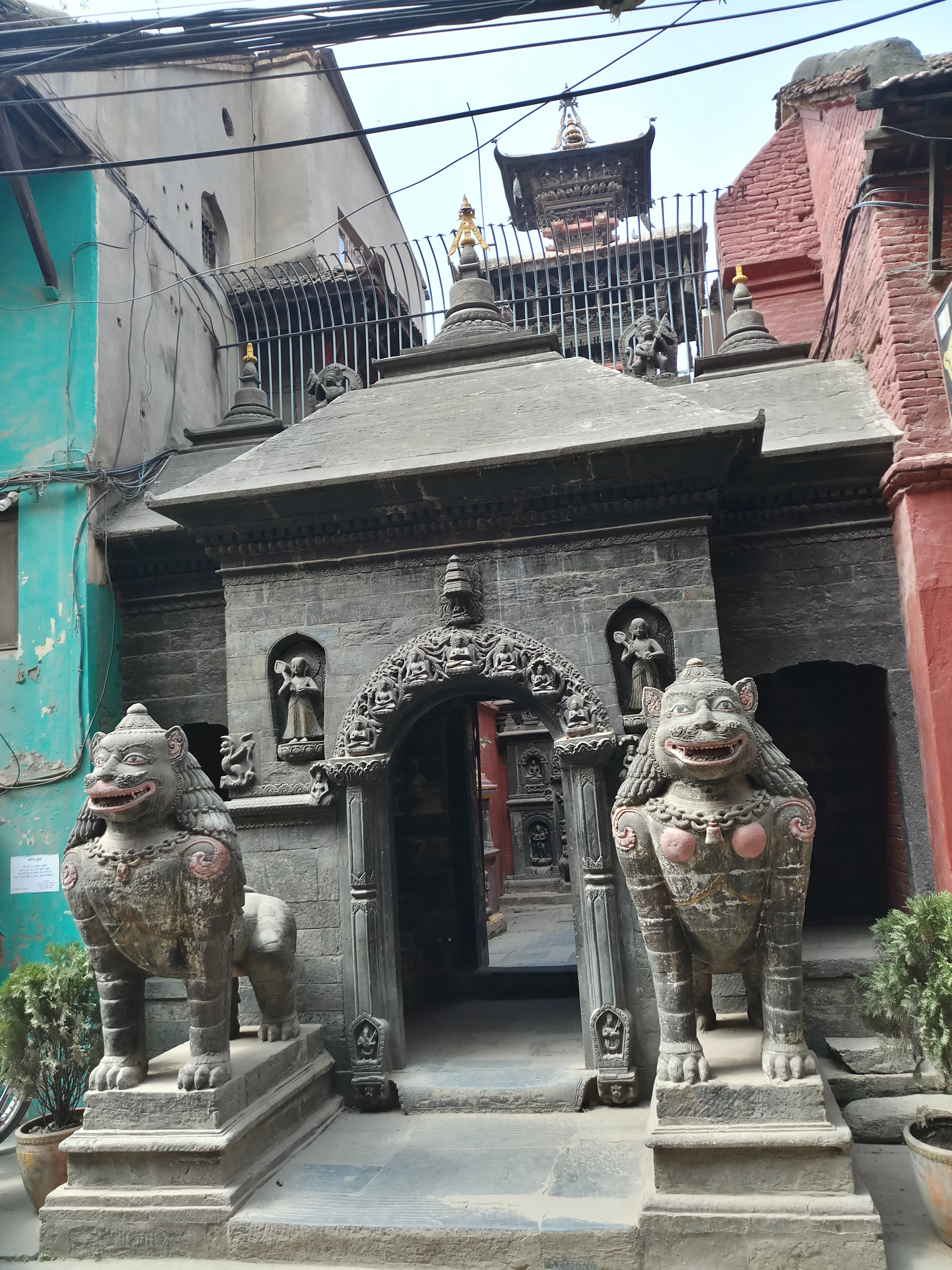
Outer gate with lions

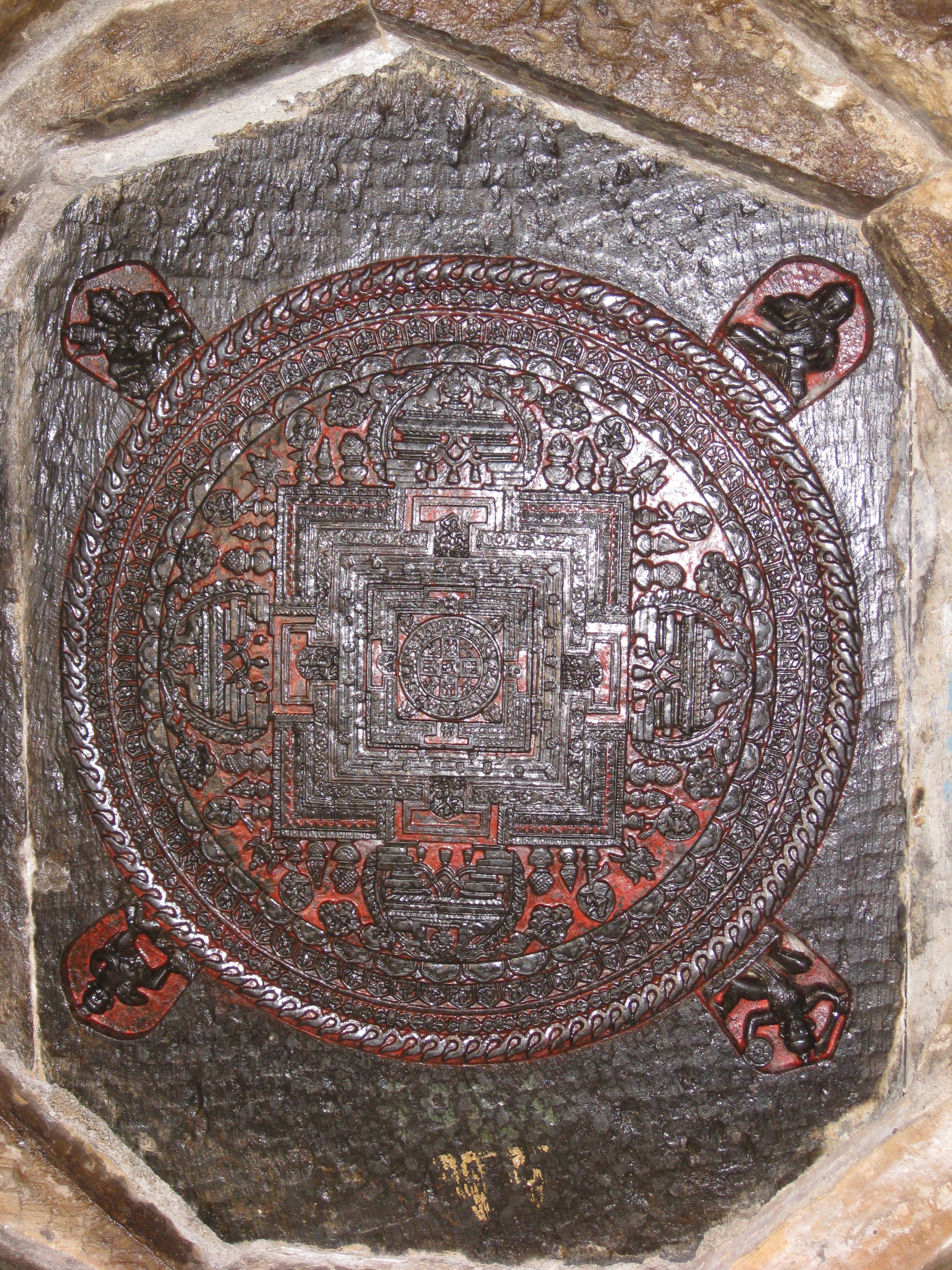
Kalachakra Mandala

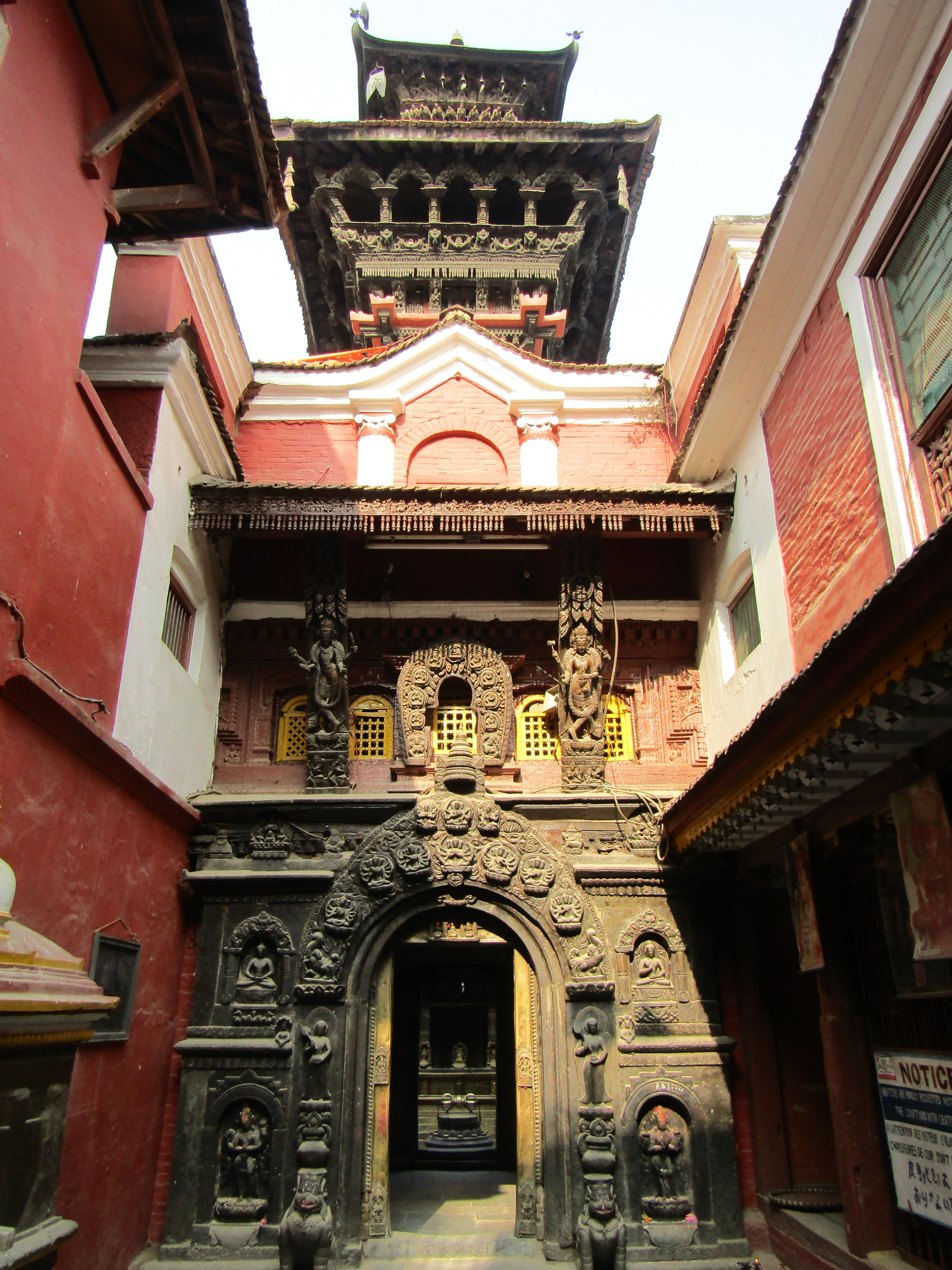
Second gate

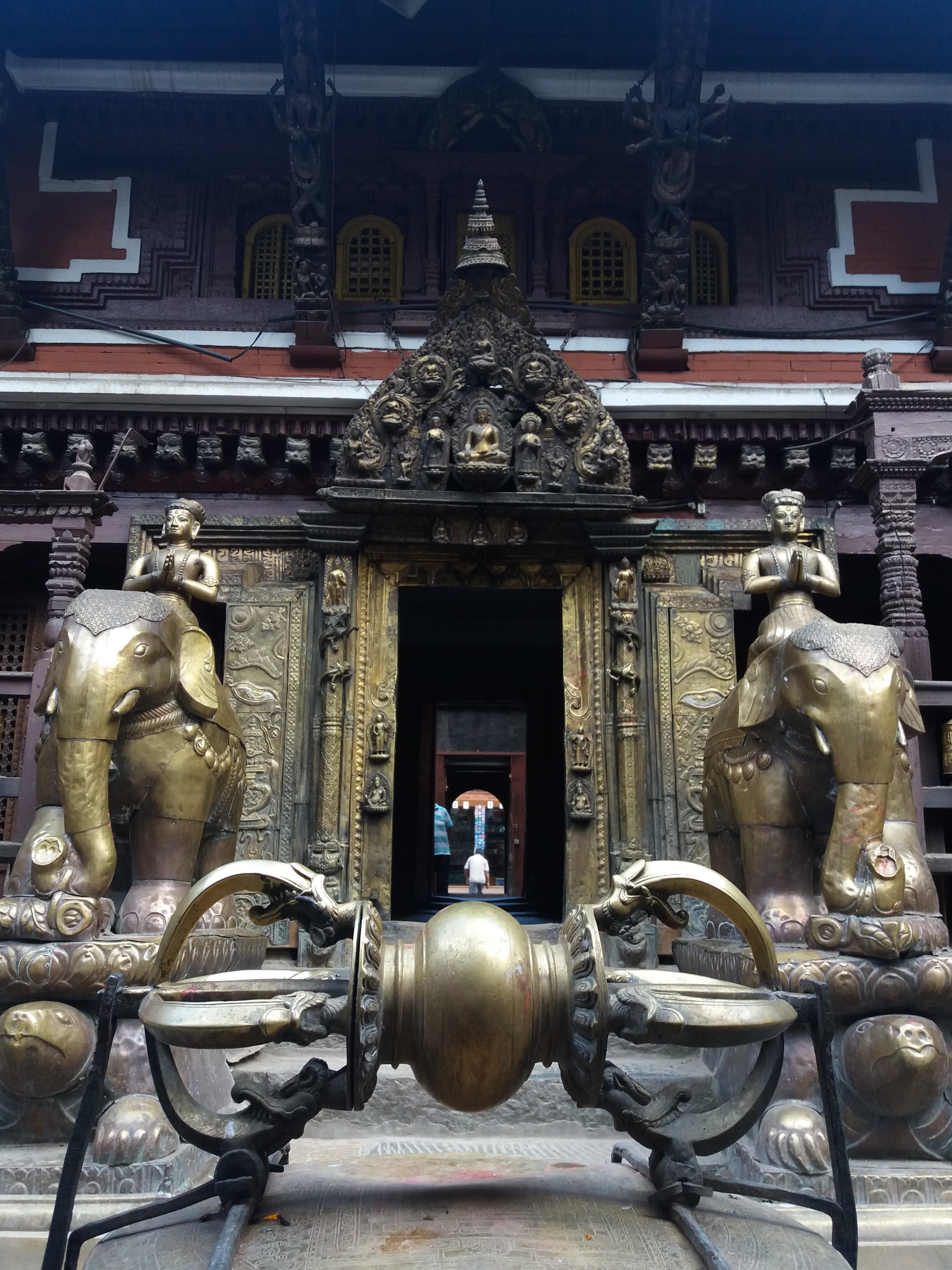
Entrance with vajra

Hiranya Varna Mahavihar is built in the style of a Nepalese bahal. The courtyard is a rectangular, almost square space. In the western corner there is an inconspicuous entrance, but the main entrance is on the south-eastern side on the Kwalakhu Road.

=== Main Gate ===
The main gate is made of stone and flanked by a pair of stone lions, one male and one female. The gate is adorned with a stone torana and several other sculptures, including a multilingual inscription. The door has a relief of Bhairavas eyes on it.

Immediately after passing the door and looking up, one sees a Kalachakra mandala on the ceiling of the entry gate. Stepping further inside one enters an open corridor, with a disused tutedhara (drinking fountain) built into the wall on the left.

At the end there is another richly adorned gate, which gives access to the courtyard. Apart from the abundance of Buddhism related sculptures, some Hindu sculptures can be seen here. Incarnations of Vishnu en Shiva, for instance, appear as roof struts that support the roof above the gate. Having passed this second arch, one enters a small vestibule with sculptures of Mahakala and Ganesha on the wall. Images of Mahakala and Ganesha, protectors of the other gods of the Kathmandu Valley, guarding the entrance of a vihara is a regular occurrence in Nepal.

There is a bell tower on top of this gate.

On the courtyard side the entrance is flanked by two golden elephants standing on tortoises. Above the door is a gilt copper torana. This torana was originally located at the main shrine, but was replaced there by a silver copy, donated during the reign of king Prithvi Bir Bikram Shah (1881–1911).

=== Sculptures ===
The first sculpture one encounters in the courtyard is a Dharmadhatu mandala on a lotus pedestal, with a vajra on top. Until recently it was protected by a canopy with prayer wheels attached to the supports. There is another vajra on the opposite side of the courtyard in front of the main shrine, next to a fire pit.

Several more sculptures can be found in the courtyard. There are three images of Padmapani Lokeshvara in each of three corners of the verandah and an image of Manjushri in the fourth, for instance, and in the corners below there are four metal statues of monkeys.

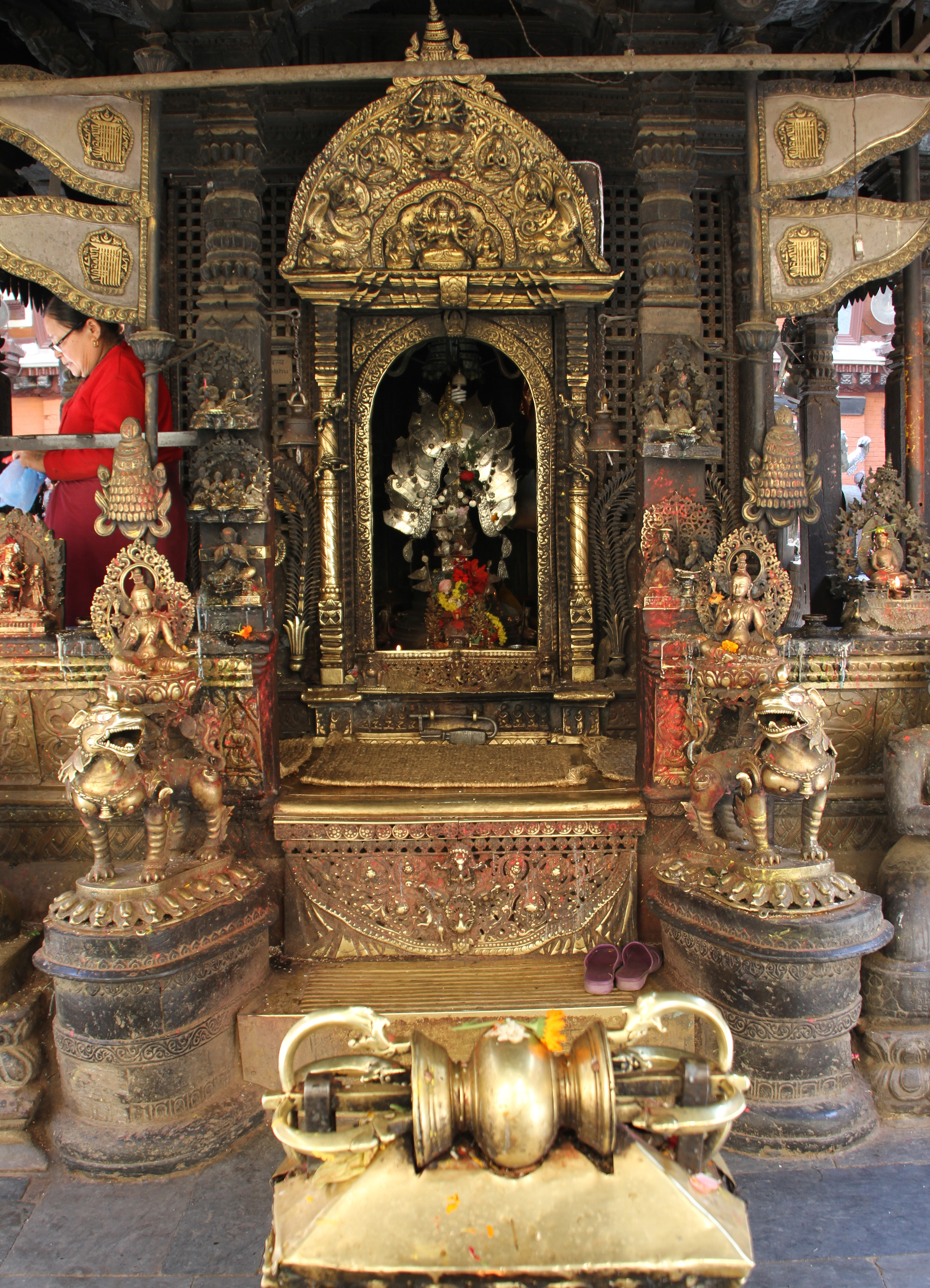
Swayambhu Stupa

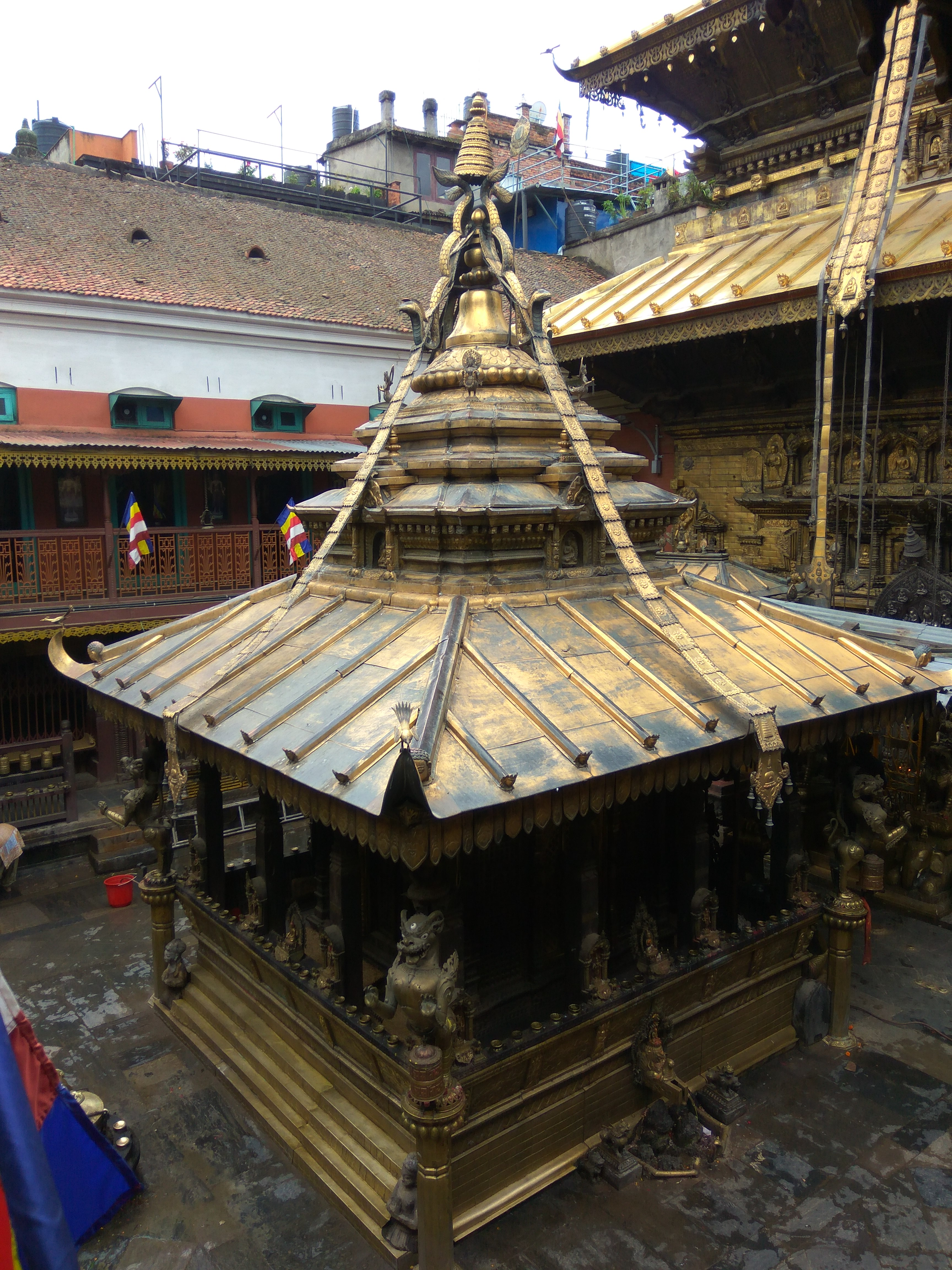
Swayambhu Stupa

=== Swayambhu Stupa ===
In the centre of the courtyard there is an enshrined chaitya, identified with Swayambhu. It is believed to be older than the golden temple itself. It has four doors, each with a torana, but only the door opposite the main shrine can be readily accessed. On the banisters around the chaitya there are 12 Lokeśvara images and four Buddha sculptures. The four corners of the temple are protected by metal leogryphs. The gilt roof has umbrellas in different layers and carries images of snakes. The side of the chaitya that is turned towards the main shrine is adorned with several other metal and stone sculptures.

Once a year the chaitya is doused with milk. The milk flows through the spout outside of one of the banisters and falls on a stone that symbolises Vasuki, king of serpents.

=== Main Temple ===
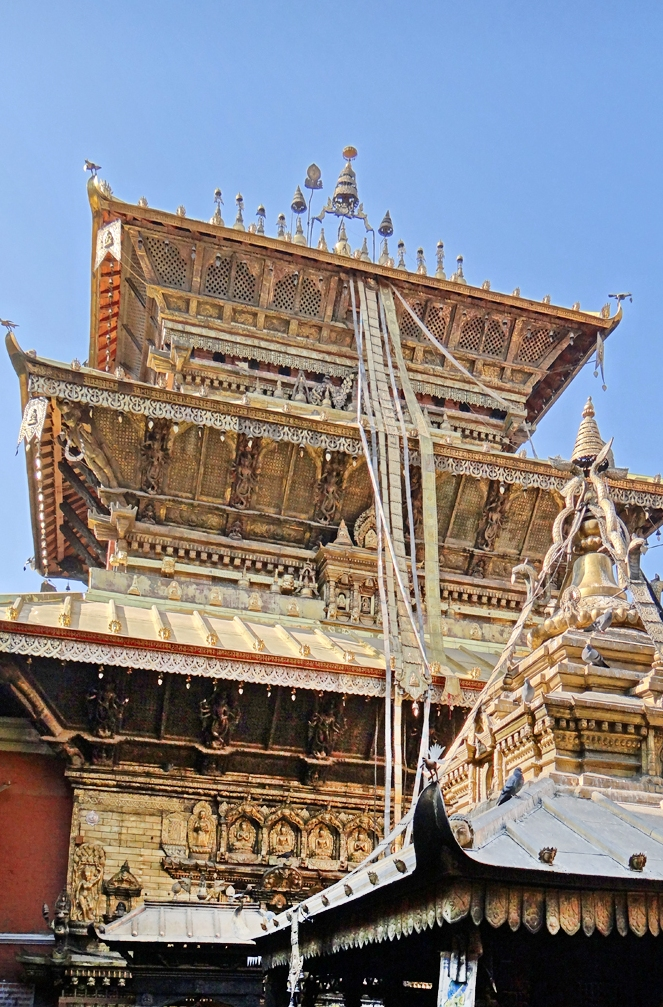
Gilt facade of the Main Temple

Opposite the entrance of the courtyard stands the main temple. The temple is four storeys high, with three slanting, gilt roofs. The facade is largely covered with either gilt sculptures or an engraved brick pattern. The lower facade of the temple shows scenes from the life of the Buddha, for instance, starting from his birth. A little higher up there is a series of small reliefs of the Five Buddhas, with the outer two doubled. Above these seven reliefs there is another row of the Five Buddhas, this time flanked by reliefs of Tara on both ends.

Above the first roof there are reliefs of the Three Jewels, which are the Buddha, the Dharma and the Sangha.

The lowest two roofs are supported by roof struts depicting multi-armed Buddha figures. The top of the second roof is adorned with nine gilt chaityas. The top roof supports thirteen such chaityas, where the centre chaitya carries three umbrellas. Four banners are hanging down from the top roof. At the end of the ribs of the roofs there are Bhodhisattva faces.

On the right side of the temple there is a small tower with a roof similar to the roof of the temple itself.

== Main Shrine ==
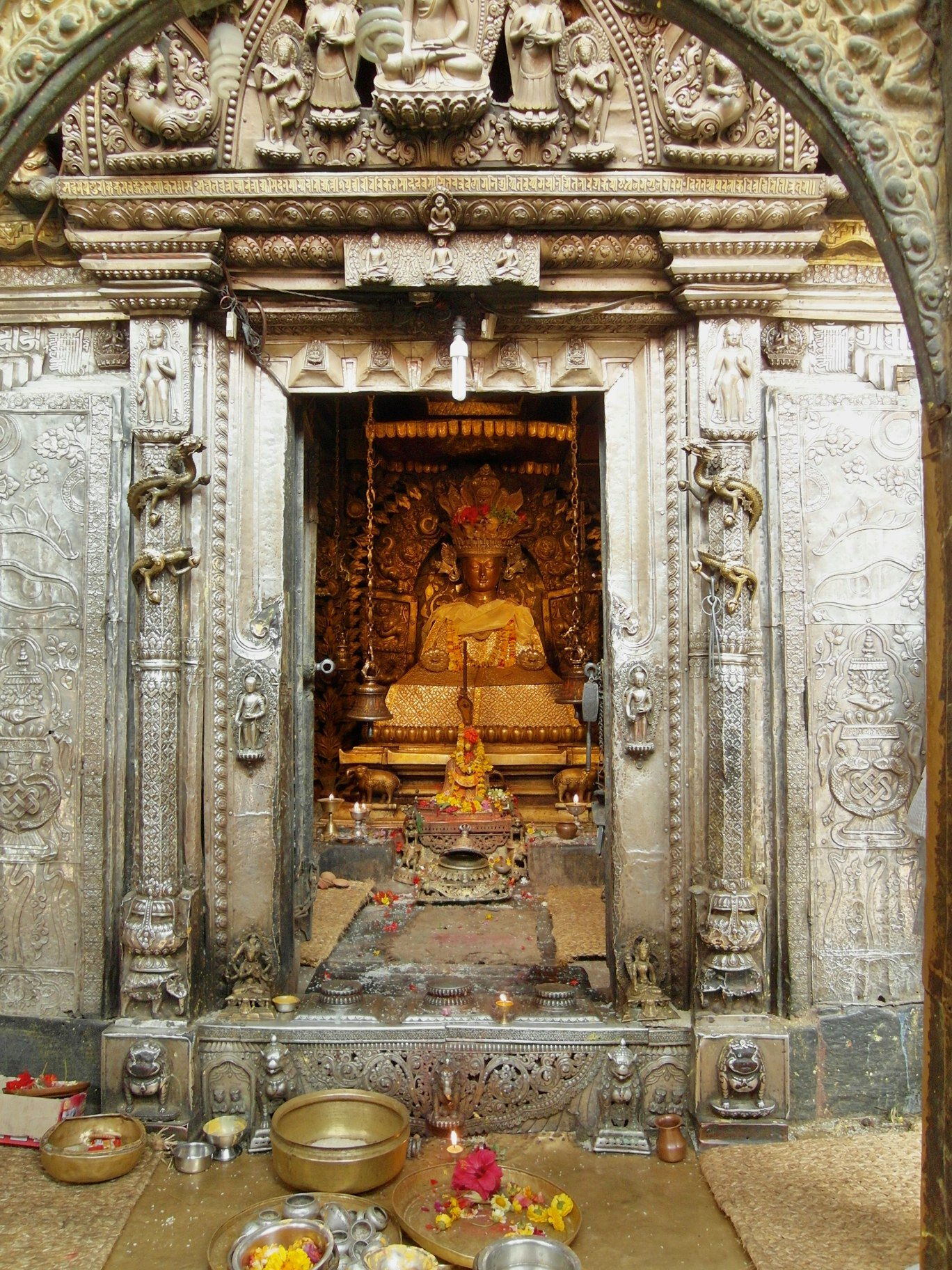
Shakyamuni Buddha

The main Shakyamuni Buddha shrine is guarded by two metal images of Lokeshvara, seated on lions, who in turn are each standing on an elephant. To the left of this stands a large temple bell. Around the sculptures the verandah is closed off by railings. Only the priest and his family are allowed in this area.

Above the door to the inner sanctum is a silver torana with reliefs of the Five Buddhas and Vajrasattva. It is a copy of the original gilt copper torana above the main entrance. There is a smaller, almost identical torana above the silver one. Below the torana are images of Amitābha, Ratnasambhava and Amoghasiddhi.

The Shakyamuni Buddha, locally also known as Kwabaju, is a large silver image, covered entirely with drapes and ornaments, except for the face. In the shrine are several other figures. Most notable is the small figure of Balarama, the elder brother of Krishna, although some claim it is actually Vajradhara, the primordial Buddha.

== Priests ==
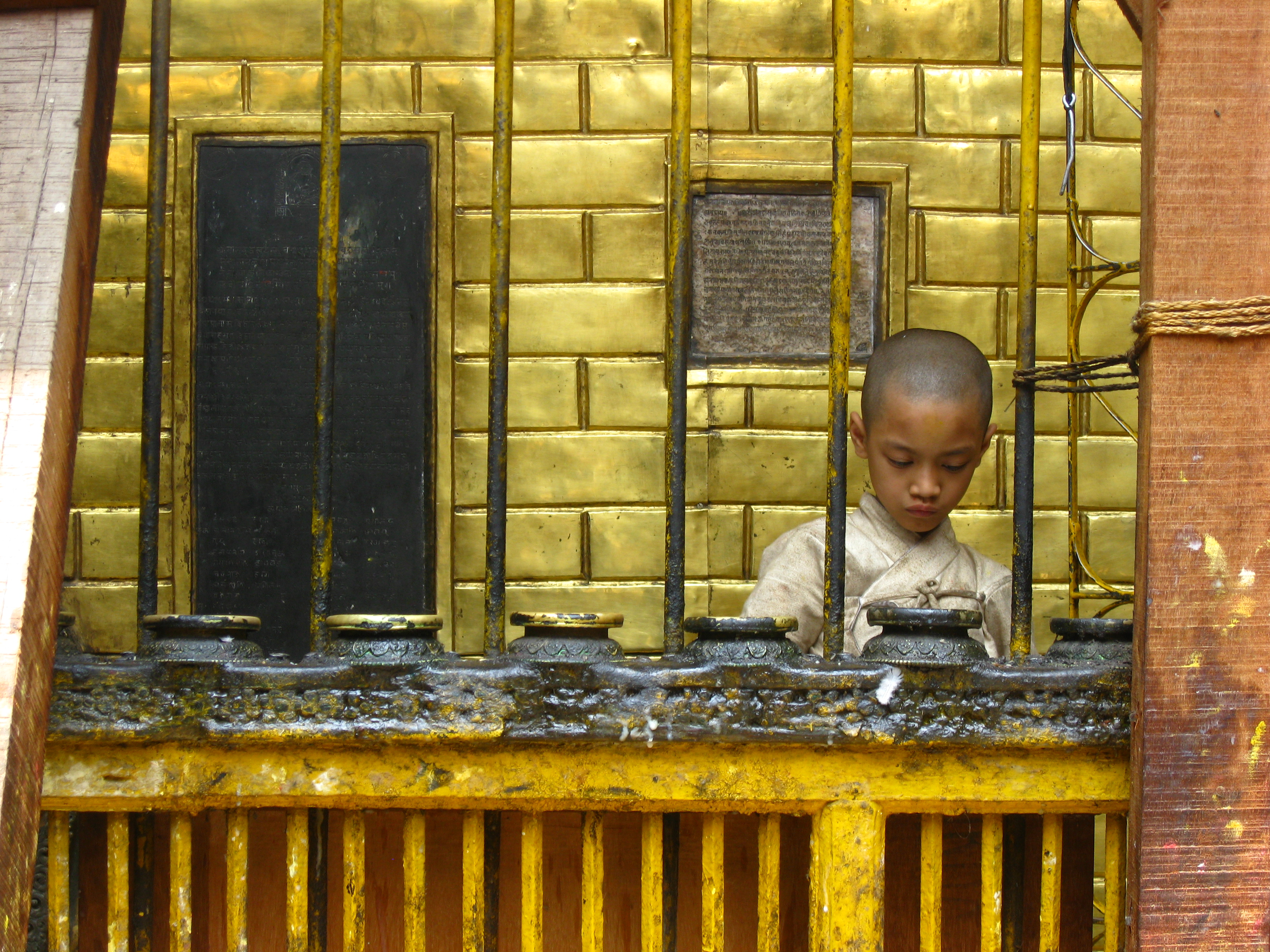
Young priest of Kwa Bahal

The principle priest or Bapacha of Hiranya Varna Mahavihar is a boy, always fewer than twelve years old. The boy is assisted by an older boy or young man. Both have been assigned their tasks for one month.

One of the tasks of the Bapacha is doing the rounds in the area around the temple twice a day, in the morning and in the evening. While walking he rings a bell and for the rest he is completely silent.

At the end of each year the twelve assistant priests of the year organise a feast in Nagbahal and every five years they are responsible for the organisation of Samyak, a festival dedicated to Dipankara Buddha

== Pragya Paramita ==
Hiranya Varna Mahavihar is the home of the approximately 800 years old sacred Buddhist text Pragya Paramita, which is restored there every three years. The last time this was done was in September 2023. Ten people worked on the restoration for a total of 25 days.

The text is still recited regularly. Such a reading can be requested by a devotee, for instance, on special occasions like a wedding or when someone in the family is ill. In Patan, the tradition of reciting the Pragya Paramita is believed to have started about 400 years ago.

Hiranya Varna Mahavihar is one of four places in Nepal where a Pragya Paramita can be found and the only one in Patan. The others are in Kathmandu: Bhagwan Bahal, Itum Baha and Piganani.

== Interiors ==
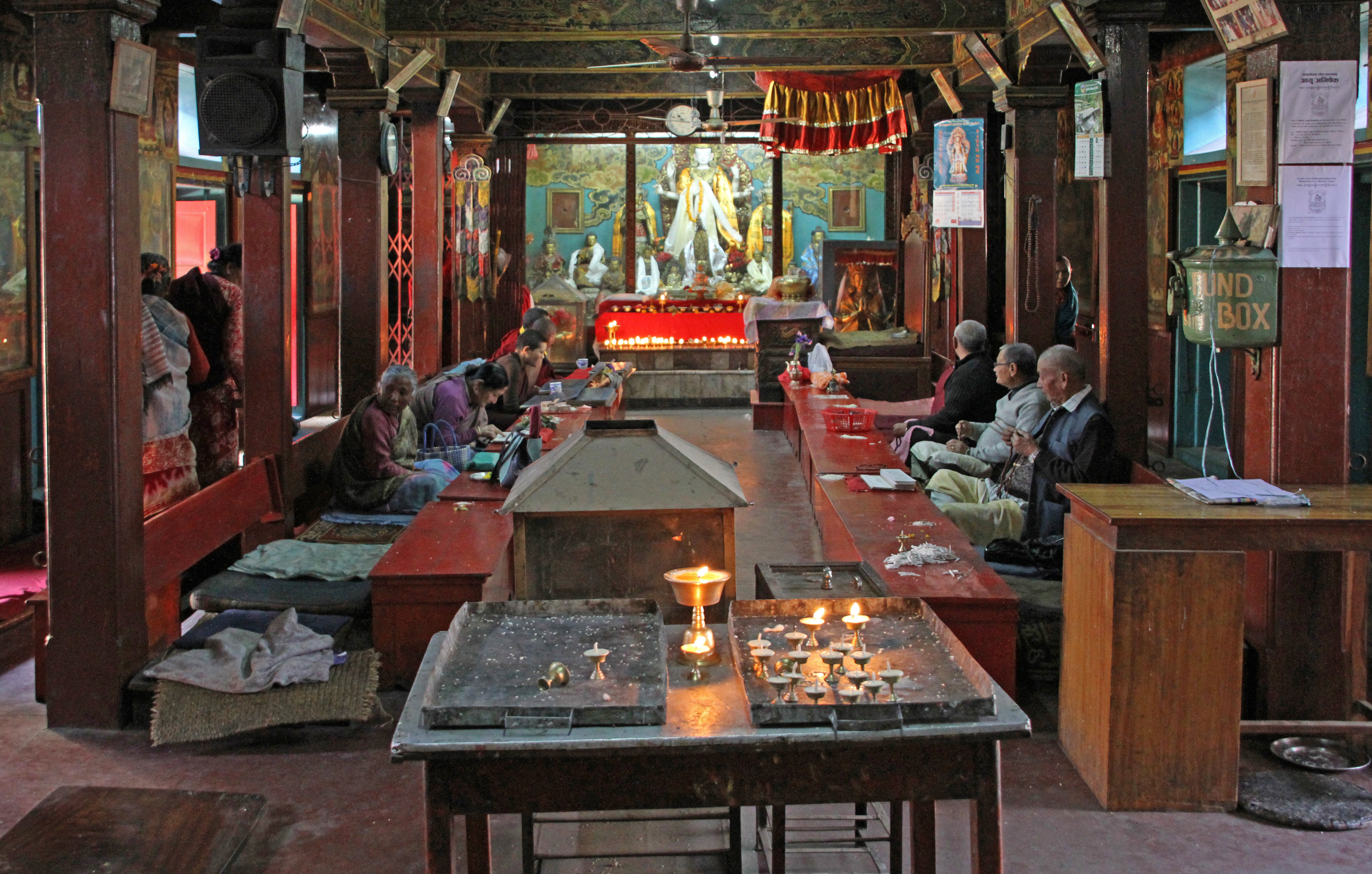
Prayer hall

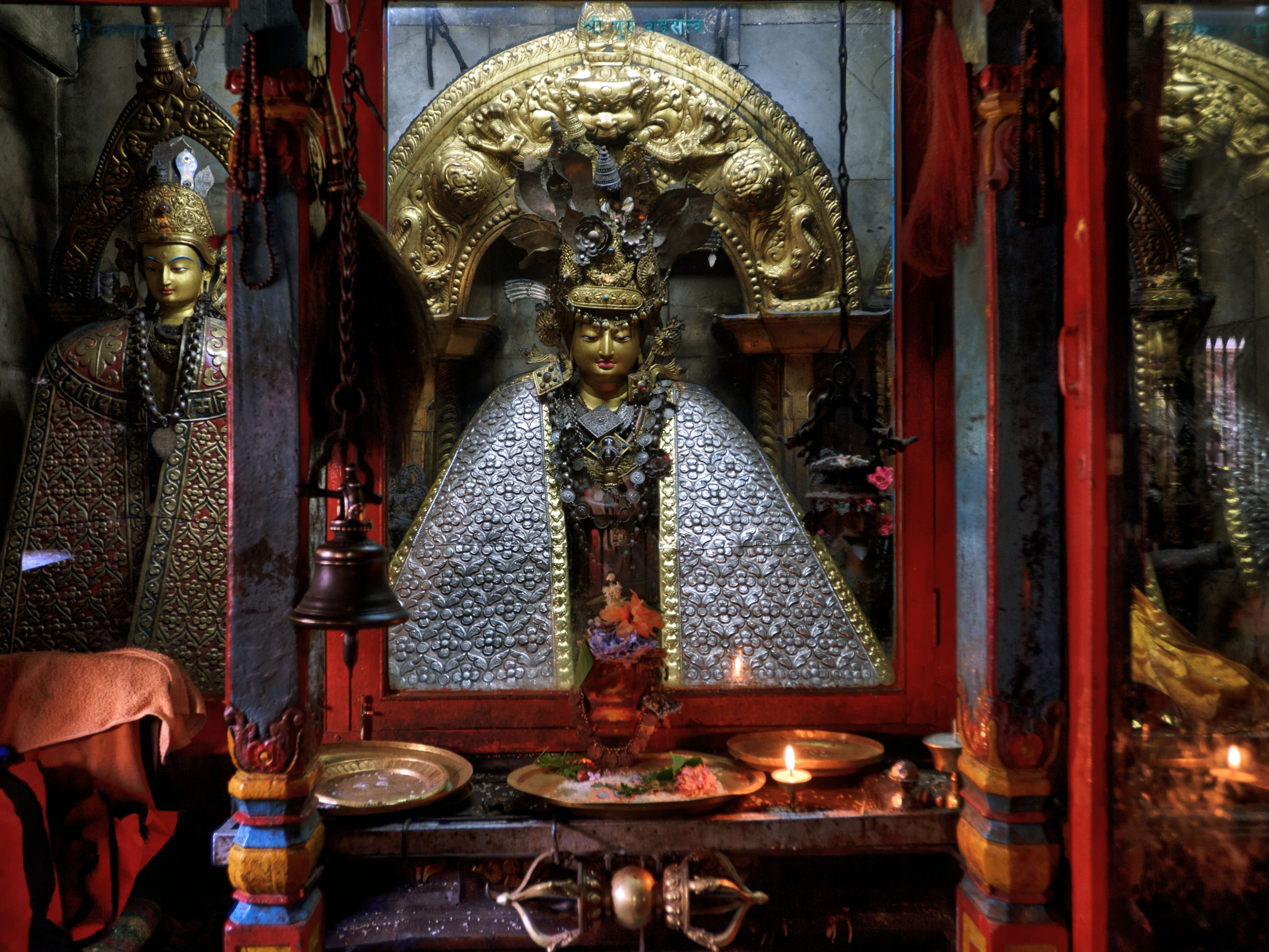
Vajrasattva

Inside the buildings on the ground floor of the complex three more chapels can be found, dedicated to Tara, Vajrasattva and Namasangiti respectively. There are more chapels on the first floor.

One of the rooms on the first floor is a prayer hall with an image of an eight-armed Amoghapasa.

== See also ==
- Bahal, Nepal
- Jana bahal
- Kindo Baha
- Nagbahal
- Te Bahal
