= List of Buddhist stotras in Nepalbhasha =

Tutah bwanegu (Nepal Bhasa:तुतः ब्वनेगु) is a ritual of reading and enunciating stotras practiced in Newar Buddhism. Most of these stotras were originally written in Sanskrit. However, many of these have been translated into Nepalbhasha. The stotras which have been translated into Nepalbhasha are as follows:

- Daśavala stōtra (दशवल स्तोत्र)
- Mahāyāna sūtra (महायान सूत्र)
- Śrī Jyōtirupa (श्री ज्योतिरुप)
- Mahāmañjuśrī (महामञ्जुश्री)
- Āryāvalōkitēśvara (आर्यावलोकितेश्वर)
- Yaśōdharā va Narasinha (यशोधरा व नरसिंह)
- Prajñāpāramitā (प्रज्ञापारमिता)
- Tārāśatanāma (ताराशतनाम)
- Bhadracaryā (भद्रचर्या)
- Nāmasaṅgīti (नामसंगीति) (partially translated)

== See also ==
- Buddha Dharma wa Nepal Bhasa
- Dharmodaya
- List of Mahaviharas of Newar Buddhism
- Newar Buddhism
