= Sankata Temple =

Hindu temple in Nepal

- संकटा मन्दिर
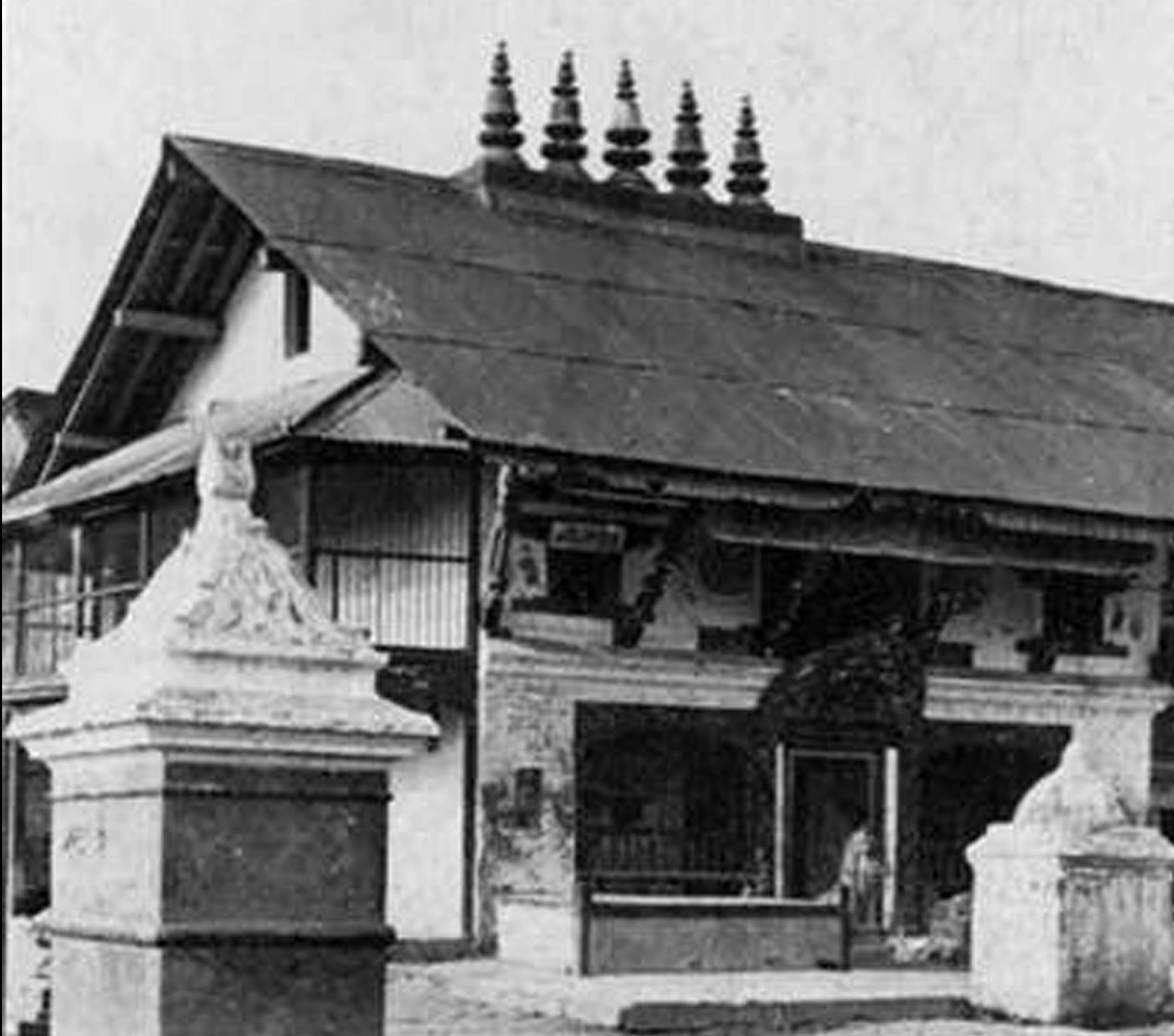
- Sankata Temple in the 1960s

- Location in Kathmandu

Religion
- Affiliation: Hinduism
- District: Kathmandu
- Deity: Chanda Maharoshan or Achala (immovable one); Palah: Dya
- Festivals: Navaratri, Dashain

Location
- Location: Te Bahal
- Country: Nepal
- Coordinates: 27°42′8.57″N 85°18′43.74″E

Architecture
- Creator: King Gunakama Dev

The Saṃkaṭā Temple (Nepali: संकटा मन्दिर), is one of the temples located at Te Bahal, Kathmandu, Nepal. Palah: Dya is a popular divinity here worshipped by Buddhists, especially on Saturdays, to ward off bad luck and sickness. Buddhists also accredit the shrine to Chanda Mahoroshan.

This shrine along with Mahankal Than and Lumadi are all worshipped at together on certain observance days.

== History/Legend ==
Legend has it that during the rule of the Malla King Narendra Dev, a Gubhajyu and Buddhist Vajrayana Guru, skilled in Tantrik practices, named Bandhu Ratna Bajracharya, used his Tantrik powers and brought Sankata and Yogini into two different holy pitchers and worshipped them, with the permission from the king. Later, a temple for the god was established during the reign of King Gunakama Dev.
