= Vajracharya =

Vajrayana Buddhist priest or master

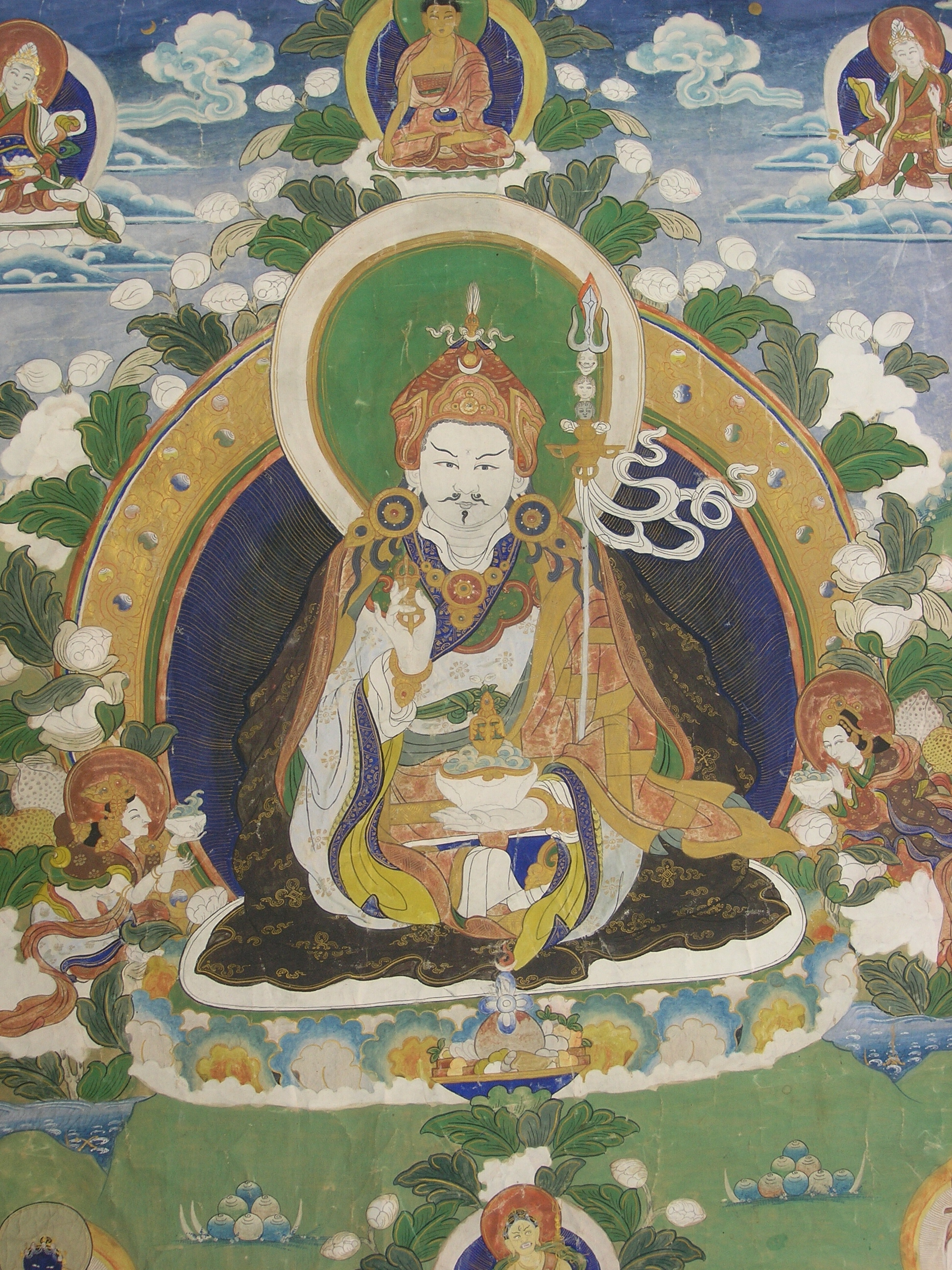
Padmasambhava, the archetypal vajra master in Tibetan Buddhism, holding a vajra and a skullcup, both important tantric ritual implements.

A vajrācārya (vajra + acharya, Tibetan: རྡོ་རྗེ་སློབ་དཔོན་, dorje lopön, Wyl. rdo rje slob dpon, Chinese: 金剛阿闍梨, pinyin: jīngāng āshélì; kanji: 金剛阿闍梨, rōmanji: kongō ajari) (alternatively, Chinese: 金剛上師, pinyin: jīngāng shàngshī) is a Vajrayana Buddhist master, guru or priest. It is a general term for a tantric master in Vajrayana and Mahayana Buddhist traditions, including Tibetan Buddhism, Chinese Esoteric Buddhism, Chan Buddhism, Shingon, Bhutanese Buddhism, Newar Buddhism.

== Tibetan Buddhism ==
Dorje Lopön is a title given to high-level religious leaders who preside over Tibetan tantric practice. Dorje is the Tibetan equivalent of the Sanskrit vajra and therefore the term appears frequently in Tibetan terminology relating to Vajrayana Buddhism.

A Dorje Lopön is usually well educated and trained in tantric practice, and is therefore a well respected figure. They might be the heads of monasteries or spiritual communities.

== Newar Buddhism ==
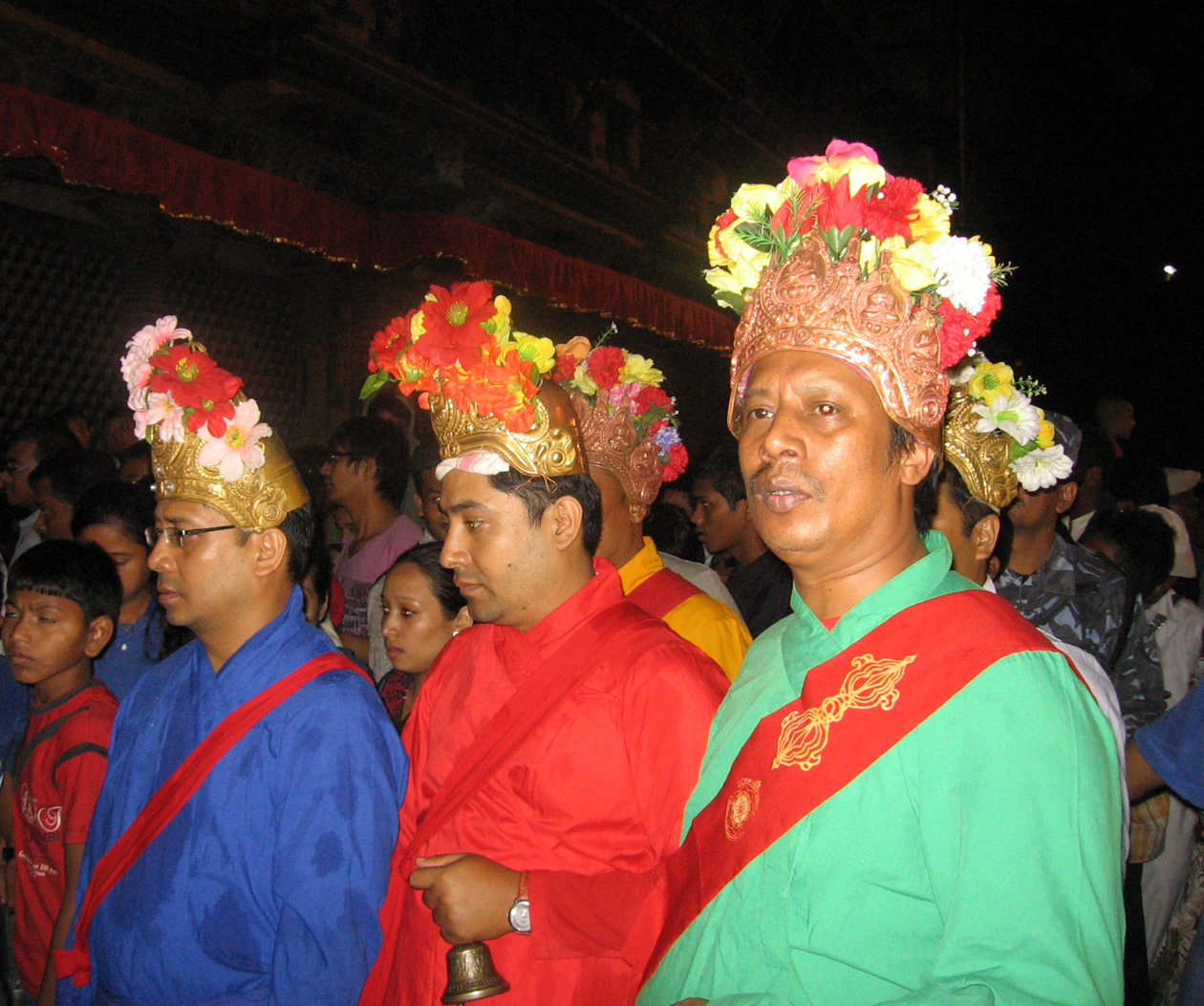
Bajracharyas in ceremonial dress

Bajracharyas are a married priestly class among the Newar communities of Nepal. They are knowledgeable in Newar Buddhist Vajrayana practices and rituals. They are also commonly called guru-ju or gu-bhaju (a short form for guru bhaju) which are Nepal Bhasa terms related to the Sanskrit term guru, and translate as "teacher" or "priest". The bajracharya is the highest ranking of the Newar castes that are born Buddhist.

The emergence of vajracharya institution is ascribed to the decline of celibate Buddhist monks in about 13th century, and the emergence of Vajrayana.

To become a professional Guruju, a person of the bajracharya caste must go through a number of rituals. The bajracharya boy goes through a ritualistic process of initiation known as bajravishekha, including shaving off the head as the Buddha and asking for alms, at a minimum of seven houses a day in different places, in the tradition of monks since the time of Gautama Buddha. Sometimes tantric Newar Buddhism and Esoteric Buddhism is referred to as "Vajracharya Buddhism".

The writers of Rebuilding Buddhism: The Theravada Movement in Twentieth-century Nepal explore the unusual relationship of the vajracharyas and their assistant shakyas with Buddhist monasticism:

Unlike Vajracharyas, Shakya men may not be priests for others, but together with Vajracharya men they are the members of the traditional Newar Buddhist monasteries, known honorifically as vihara and colloquially as Baha or Bahi. In so far as Shakya and Vajracharya men filled their roles in the monastery, they were monks. In effect, they were married, part-time monks.

Many of the modern Buddhist scholars in Nepal belong to the vajracharya tradition. There are several legendary Vajracharya priests from different parts of Kathmandu valley. Shantikara Acharya, a king who turned into a powerful tantric priest and disappeared inside the cave in Shantipur, Swayambhunath is well known for his expertise in Vajrayana Buddhist practice. He is still believed to be dwelling inside the Shantipura cave performing intense Sadhana. Vajracharya Bandhudutta, who was a disciple of the legendary Shantikara Acharya, is credited with bringing Lord Lokesvara from Kamaru Kamakhya Askam, in Kathmandu valley. Leela Vajra, a Buddhist priest from Sakhu is believed to have built Kasthamandap from the wood obtained from Kalpabrikshya. Leela Vajra, also known as Lilapa, is counted among the 84 Mahasiddha. Similarly Surata Vajra, Vak Vajra, Sashwot Vajra, Manjuvajra (Jamana Gubhaju) etc., are some of the famous Vajracharya priests whose folklores of magical and mystical deeds have remained popular among the Newar people of Kathmandu valley.

== See also ==
- Dharmabhāṇaka
- Indonesian Esoteric Buddhism
- Jain Mahatma
- Newar caste system
