= Te Bahal =

Temple courtyard in Nepal

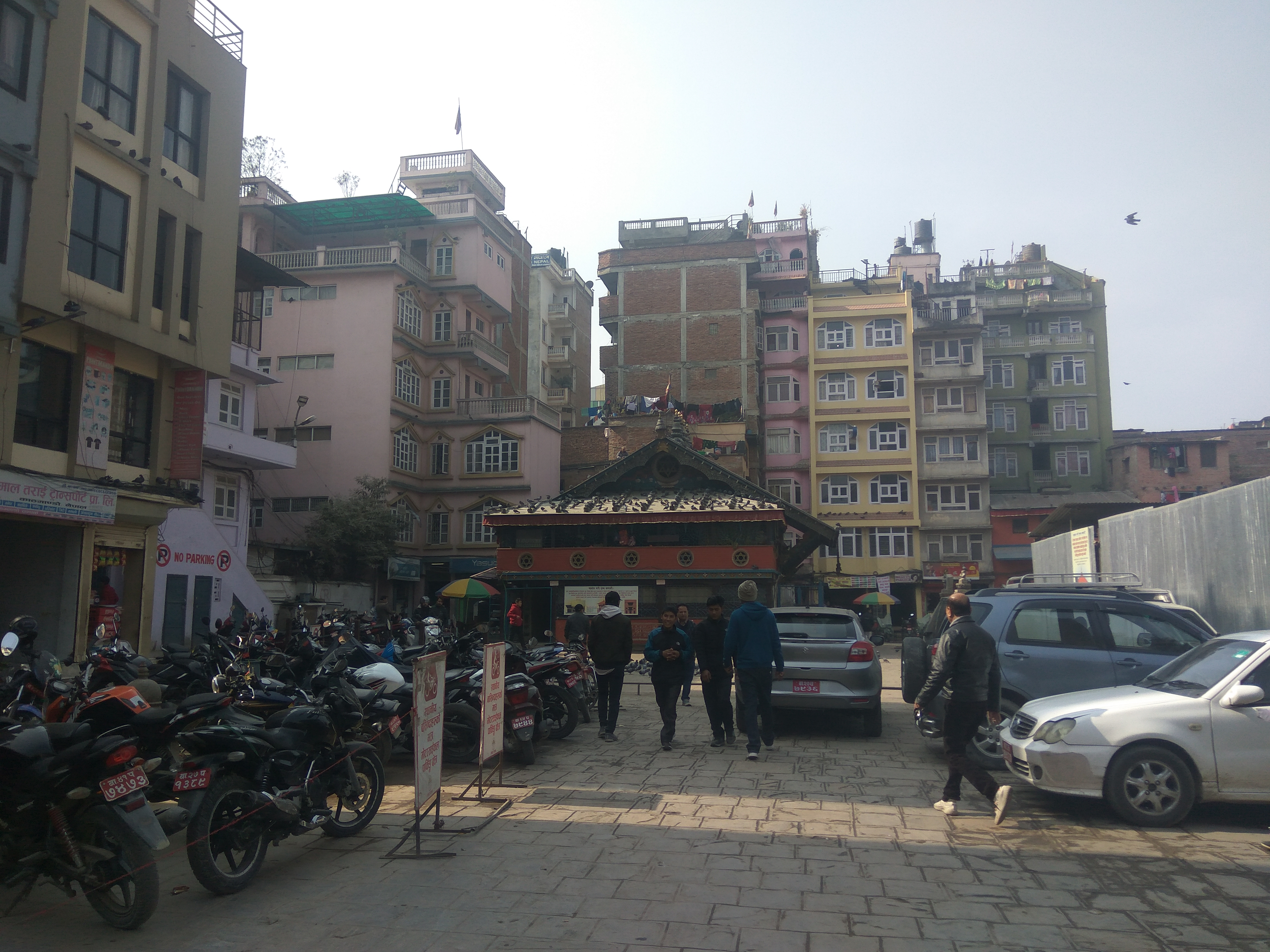
- Te Bahal in 2019
- Interactive map of Te Bahal
- 27°42′8.16″N 85°18′44.09″E
- Location: Kathmandu, Nepal

Te Bahal (also called Raja Kirti Mahavihar) is the largest bahal in Kathmandu, Nepal. It is home to the deity Sankata, worshiped by both Hindus and Buddhists.

Unlike other bahals, Te Bahal has two baha shrines, suggesting there may have been two bahals, Te Bahal and Bandhudatta Bahal, that were later merged into one.

== Temples ==
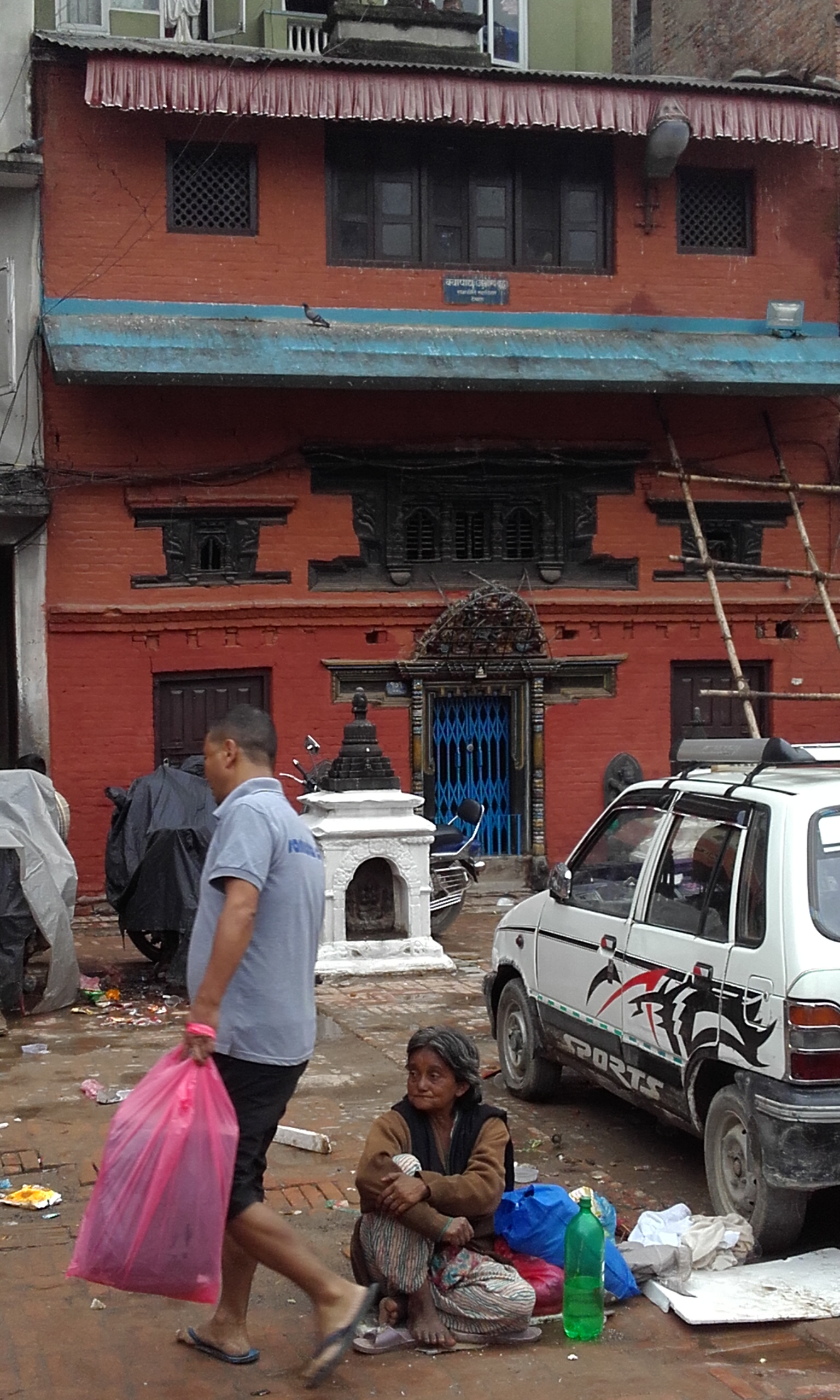
Main temple

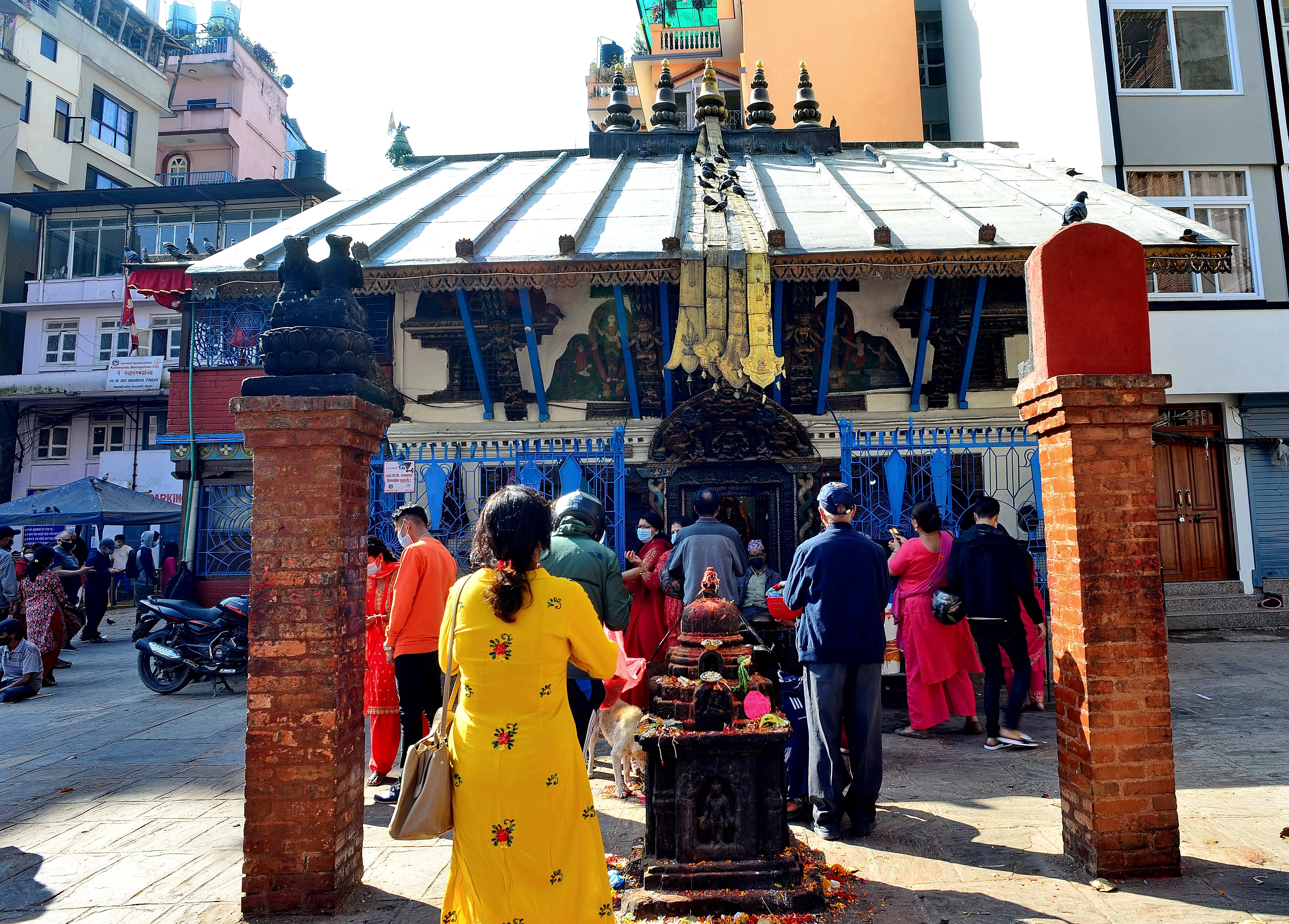
Sankata Temple

The main temple of Te Bahal is on the west side of the courtyard and enclosed by private houses. Above the door is a torana dating from 1700 AD and a statue each of Śāriputra and Maudgalyayana stands on either side of the door. Two chaityas stand in front of the building.

In the centre of the courtyard, opposite the main temple is a second baha shrine, called Bandhudatta Mahavihar. There may have been a second bahal there, but only one building is now left. It is a one storey brick building, three feet above ground level, with a tile roof. There is no torana or any other type of ornaments.

On the south side of the courtyard is the Sankata Temple. This is the most important temple in the courtyard. It has two storeys and a metal roof. The roof carries a row of five small chaityas. The shrine on the ground floor is of Padmapani Lokeshvara and the Sankata shrine is on the first floor. Sankata is worshipped by devotees who are seeking protection against bad luck or illness, Buddhists as well as people of other religions.

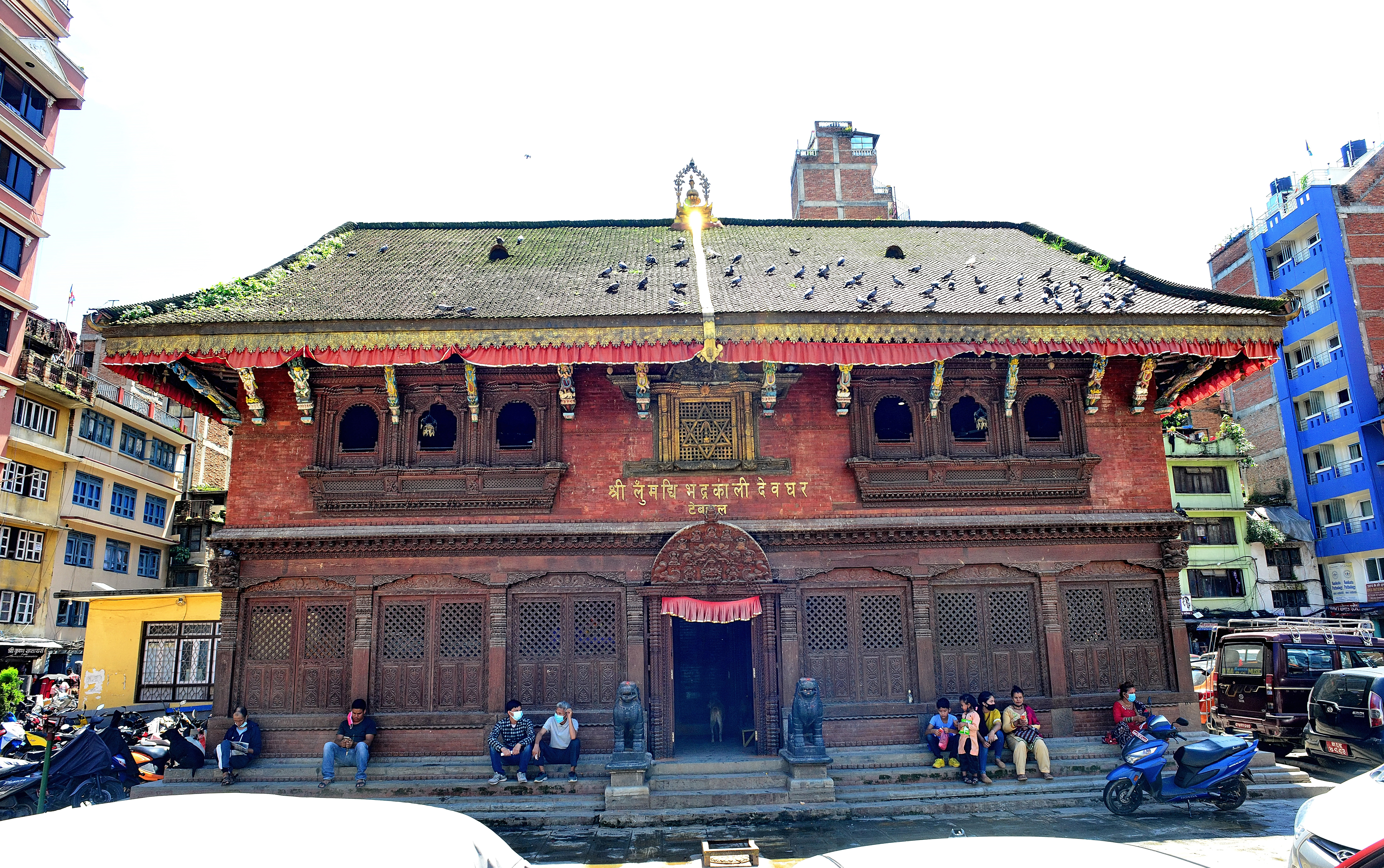
Bhadrakali Dyochhen

The eastern side of the courtyard is dominated by the Bhadrakali Dyochhen. This two storey structure looks very much like an ordinary house, except for some of the ornate woodwork. It houses shrines of Ganesha, Bhairava and the Matrikas.

To the south of the Bhadrakali Dyochhen stands a large stupa, surrounded by four small chaityas on each of the four corners of its base.

Apart from those already mentioned, there are several more chaityas scattered around the courtyard: one is in front of the Sankata Temple, for instance and three are in the northwest corner of the couryard.

East of the Sankata Temple is an image of Saraswati. North of the Bandhudatta Mahavihar are a water tap and three Surya sculptures. To the north of these is a shrine of Nataraja, the dancing Shiva.

== See also ==
- Bahal, Nepal
- Jana bahal
- Kindo Baha
- Kwa Bahal
- Nagbahal
