= Newar Buddhism =

Form of Vajrayana Buddhism practiced by the Newar people of the Kathmandu Valley, Nepal

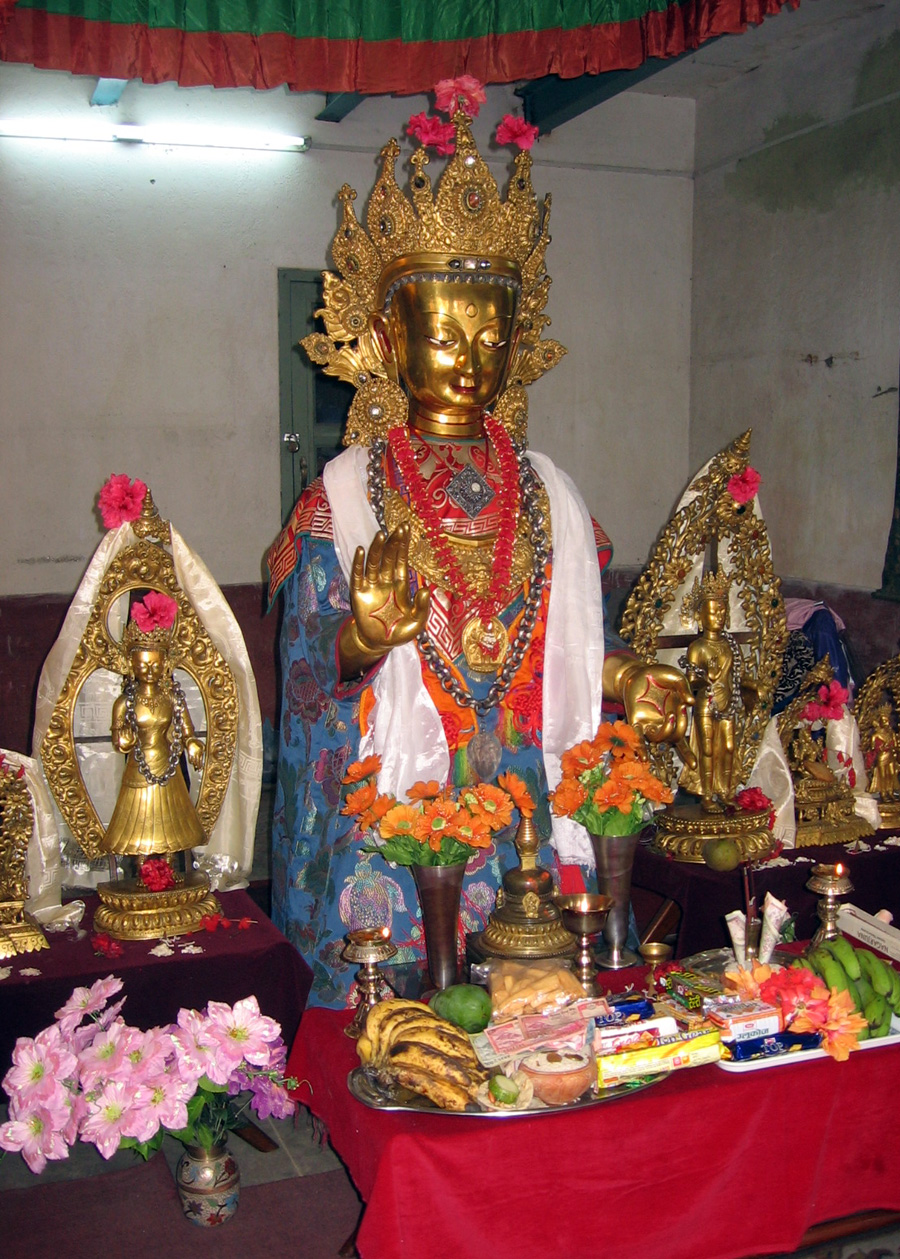
- Dīpankara Buddha (Bahi-dyah) on display during Gunla. Gunla is a holy month for Newar Buddhists.
- Type: Vajrayana
- Scripture: Various Mahayana Sutras and Tantras
- Language: Sanskrit, Nepal Bhasa
- Separated from: Mainstream Nepalese Buddhism
- Members: Newar people
- Ministers: Vajracharya priests

Newar Buddhism is a form of Vajrayana Buddhism practiced by the Newar people of the Kathmandu Valley, Nepal. It has developed unique socio-religious elements, which include a non-monastic Buddhist society based on the Newar caste system and patrilineality.

Although there was a vibrant regional tradition of Buddhism in the Kathmandu Valley during the first millennium, the transformation into a distinctive cultural and linguistic form of Buddhism appears to have taken place in the fifteenth century, at about the same time that similar regional forms of Indic Buddhism such as those of Kashmir and Indonesia were on the wane.

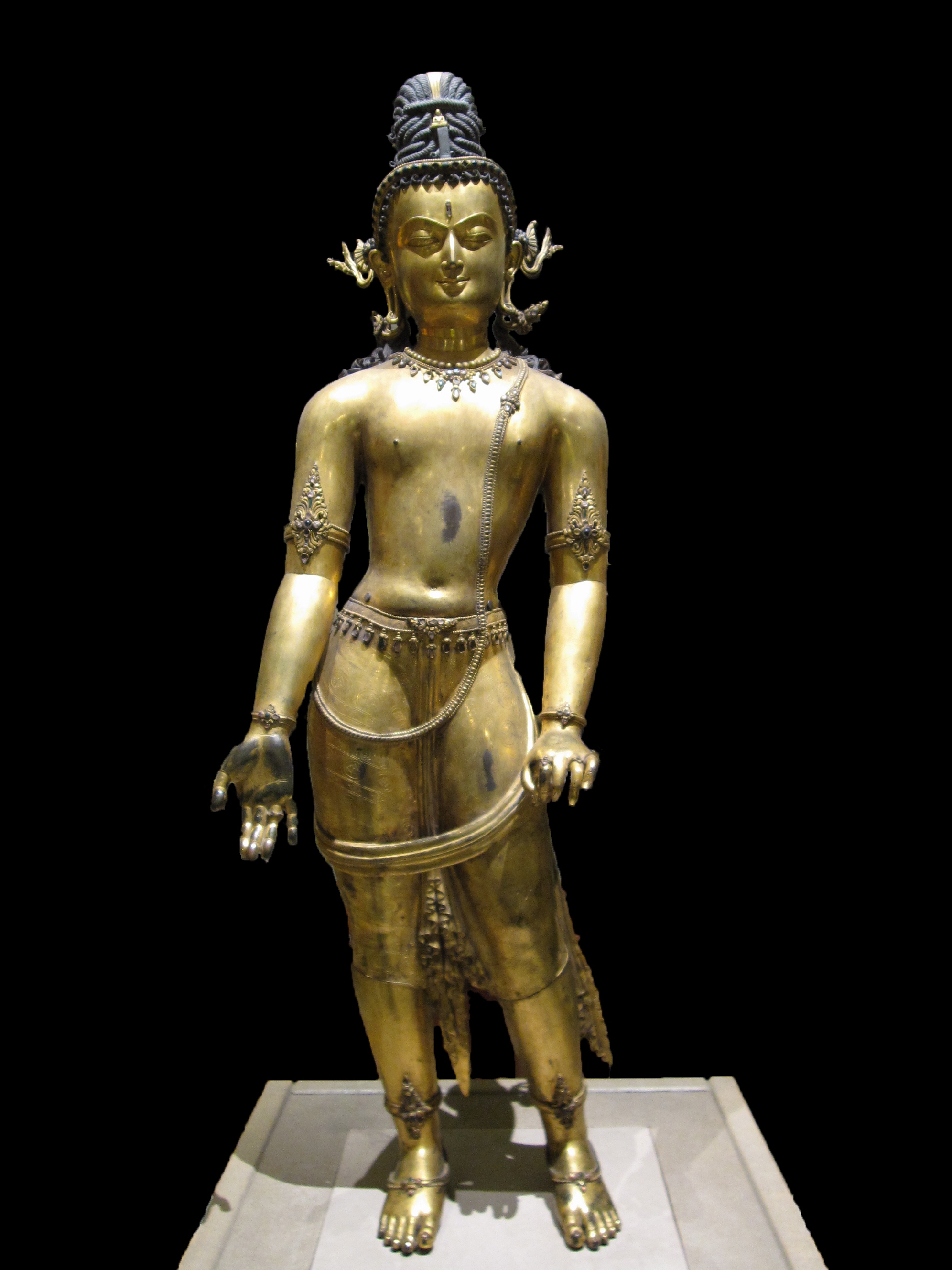

Avalokiteśvara, Nepal, 16th century CE

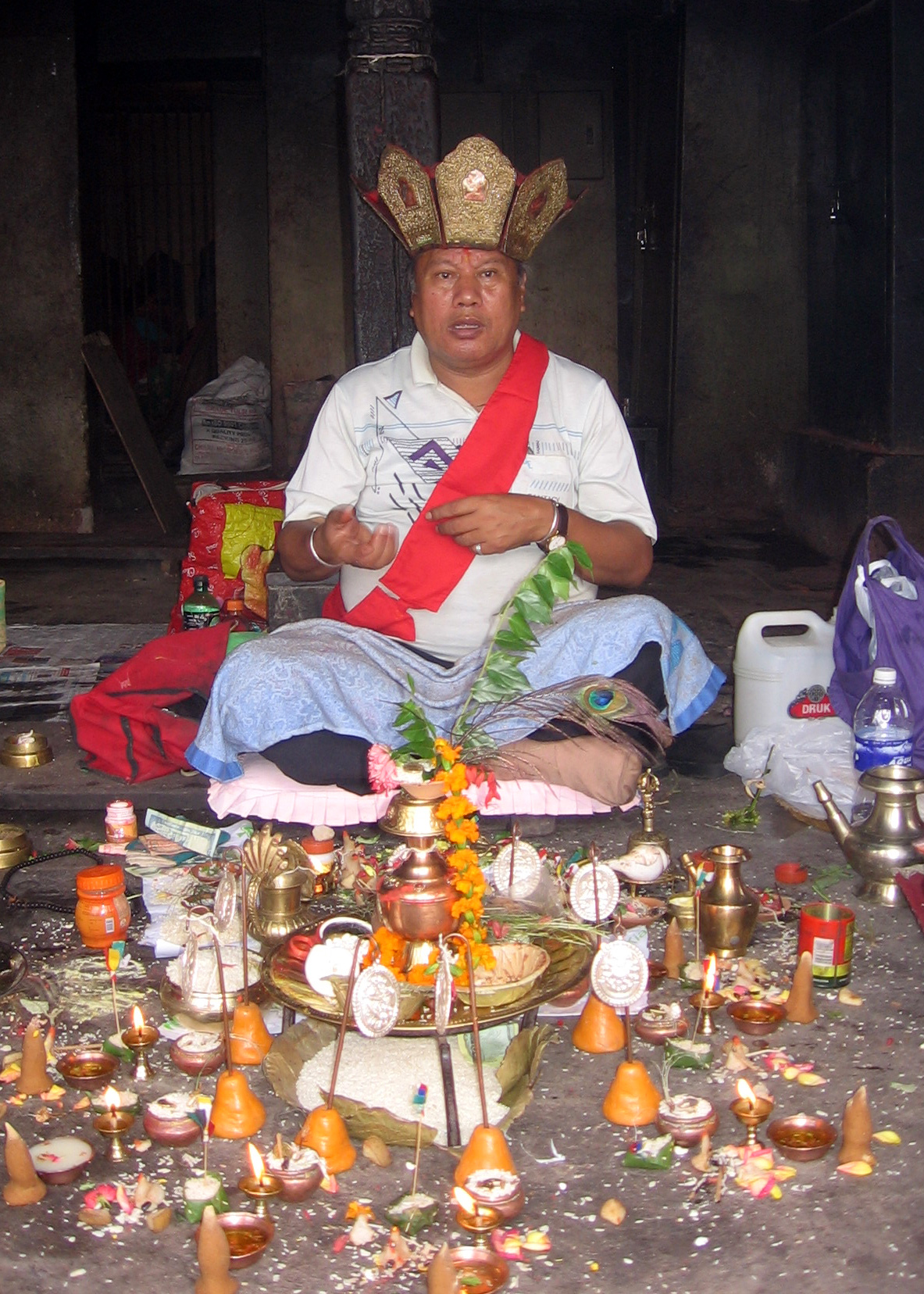

A Vajracharya priest of Newar community

== Castes ==
Its caste system has a non-celibate religious clergy caste formed of vajracharya (who perform rituals for others) and shakya (who perform rituals mostly within their own families). Other Buddhist Newar castes like the Urāy act as patrons. Urāy also patronise Tibetan Vajrayana, Theravadin, and even Japanese clerics.

== Textual tradition ==
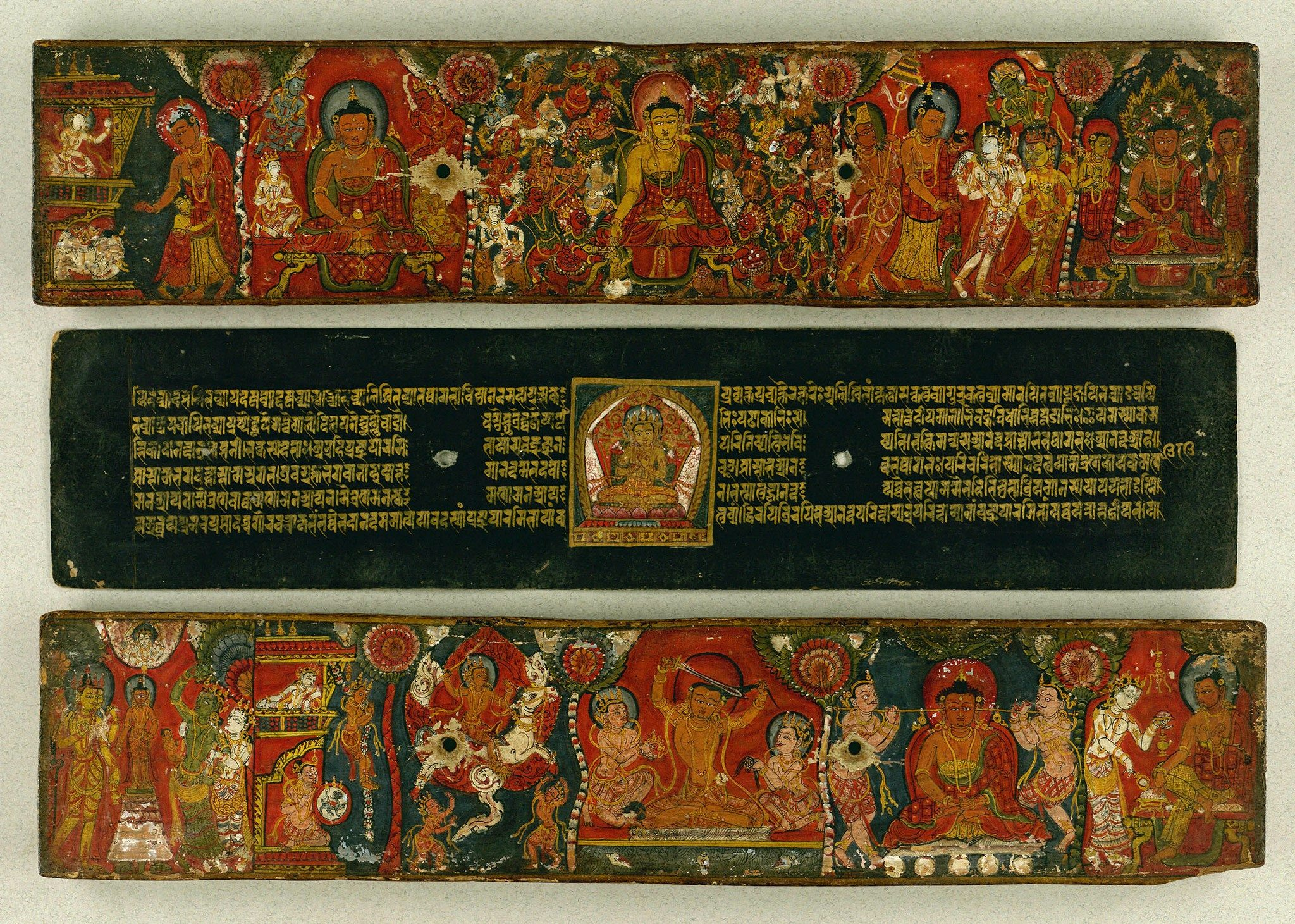
Painted covers and single folio from the Aṣṭasāhasrikā Prajñāpāramitā manuscript from Nepal, dated 1511 CE. (Sanskrit language, Ranjana script)

The use of Sanskrit as a lingua sacra survives in the Newar Buddhism of Nepal, and arguably the vast majority of Sanskrit Buddhist manuscripts have been preserved by this tradition. The Newar Buddhist tradition most prominently employs Sanskrit for all ritual and study purposes, and as such is the only living Buddhist Sanskrit tradition. It is distinct for its emphasis on preserving the Sanskrit originals of many Mahayana and Vajrayana scriptures, which have otherwise been lost in India and survived only in translations in regions like Tibet and China. The Newar Buddhists have continued to copy Sanskrit manuscripts up to the present day.

The Kathmandu Valley has long been a center for Buddhist scholarship, particularly following the destruction of Indian monasteries after the 12th-century Muslim conquests. Tibetan scholars often visited to acquire texts, and local Newar Buddhists, including householder clergy (śākyabhikṣus and vajrācāryas), were proficient in Sanskrit, making it a significant language for Buddhist scholarship in the region. From the 19th century onwards, Sanskrit manuscripts from Nepal were collected and sent to academic institutions in Calcutta and Europe by figures like Brian H. Hodgson, contributing to modern Buddhist studies.

=== Navagrantha ===
Newar Buddhism has a group of nine Sanskrit Mahayana sutras called the Navagrantha, these are considered the key Mahayana sutra texts of the tradition. They are:

1. Aṣṭasāhasrikā Prajñāpāramitā Sūtra
2. Saddharma Puṇḍarīka Sūtra
3. Suvarṇaprabhāsa Sūtra
4. Samādhirāja Sūtra
5. Gandavyūha Sūtra
6. Laṅkāvatāra Sūtra
7. Daśabhūmika Sūtra
8. Lalitavistara Sūtra
9. Tathāgataguhya (the text of this sutra was lost, and later replaced by the Guhyasamāja Tantra)

== Artistic tradition ==
Newar Buddhism is characterized by its extensive and detailed rituals, a rich artistic tradition of Buddhist monuments and artwork like the chaitya (stupa), Baha and Bahi monastic courtyards, statues, paubha scroll paintings and mandala sand paintings, and by being a storehouse of ancient Sanskrit Buddhist texts, many of which are now only extant in Nepal.

According to the authors of Rebuilding Buddhism: The Theravada Movement in Twentieth-Century Nepal: "Today traditional Newar Buddhism is unquestionably in retreat before Theravada Buddhism." Chachā (Charyā) ritual song and dance and Gunlā Bājan music are other artistic traditions of Newar Buddhism. Although Newar Buddhism was traditionally bound to the Kathmandu Valley and its environs, there is at least one new Newar Buddhist temple in Portland, Oregon.

== Outdoor festivals ==
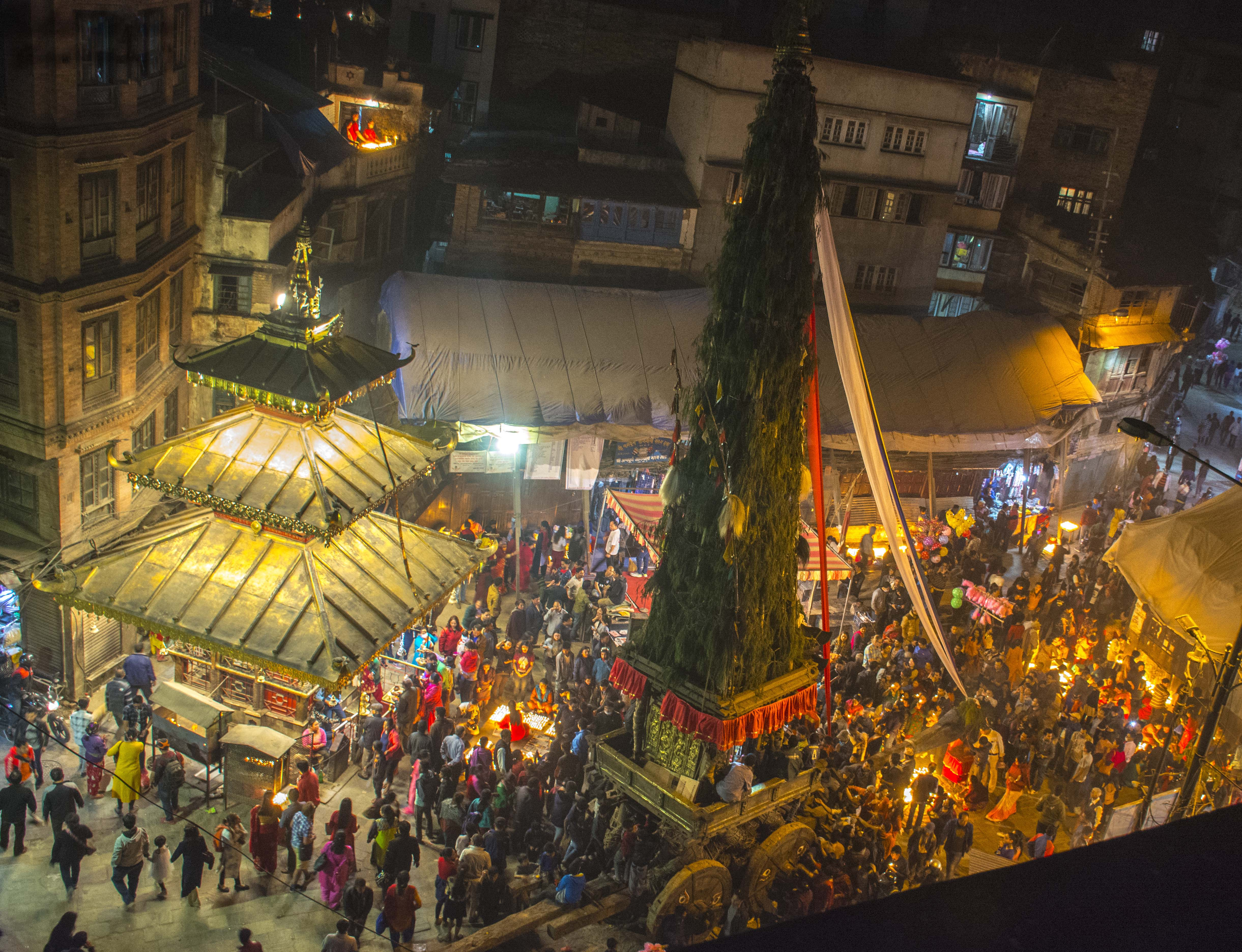
Seto Machindranath Jatra at the Temple of Annapurna

A number of major street celebrations are held periodically involving processions, displays of Buddha images and services in the three cities of the Kathmandu Valley and in other parts of Nepal.

The main events are Samyak (almsgiving and display of Buddha images), Gunla (holy month marked by musical processions and display of Buddha images), Jana Baha Dyah Jatra (chariot procession in Kathmandu), Bunga Dyah Jatra (chariot processions in Lalitpur, Dolakha and Nala), and Bajrayogini Jatra (processions in Sankhu and Pharping).

== See also ==
- Buddhism in Nepal
- Kindo Baha
- List of Buddhist stotras in Nepalbhasha
- List of Mahaviharas of Newar Buddhism
- List of monasteries in Nepal
- List of stupas in Nepal
- Pranidhipurna Mahavihar
- Vajracharya
- Chinese Esoteric Buddhism
- Indonesian Esoteric Buddhism
