= Kindo Baha =

Theravadin Buddhist Vihara in Nepal

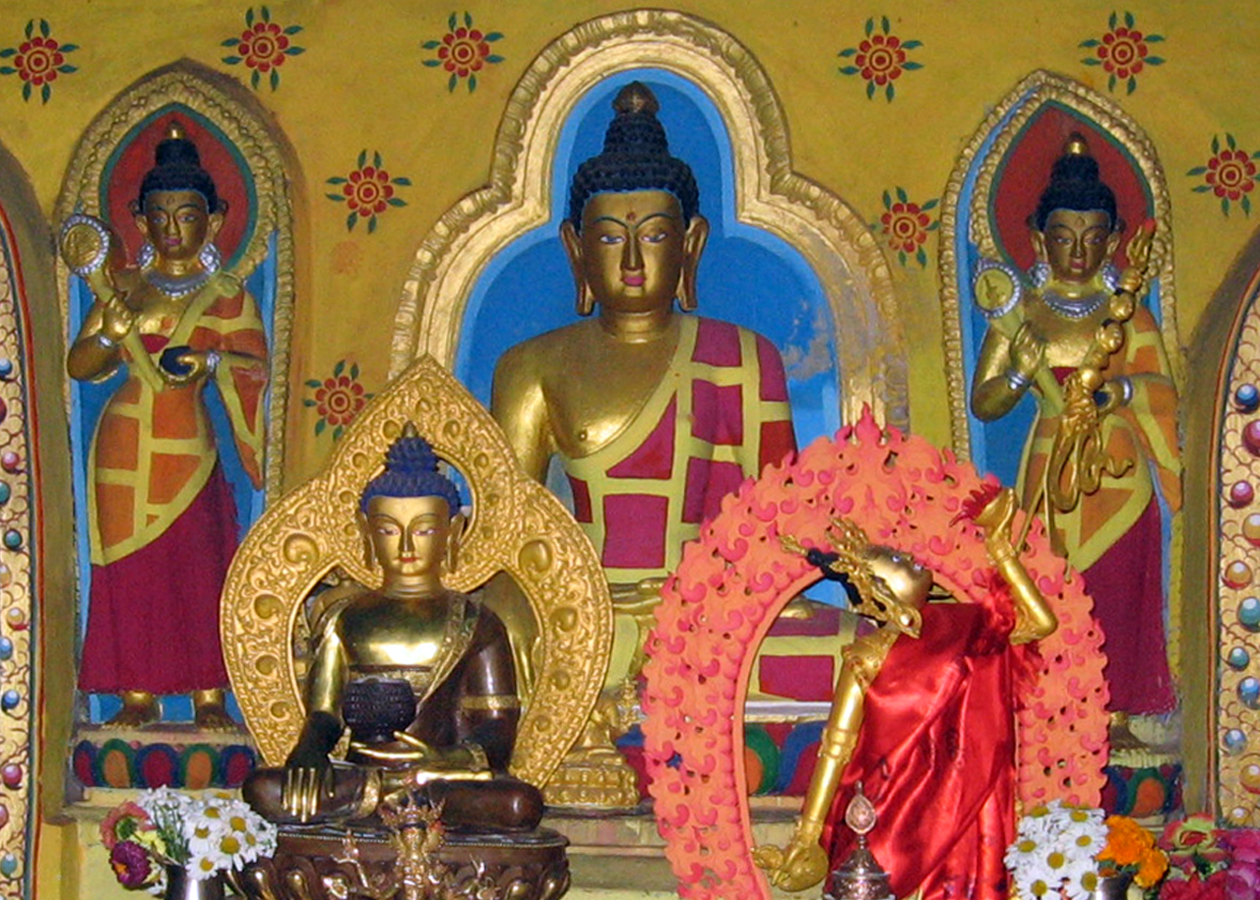
Statue of Akshobhya at Kindo Baha

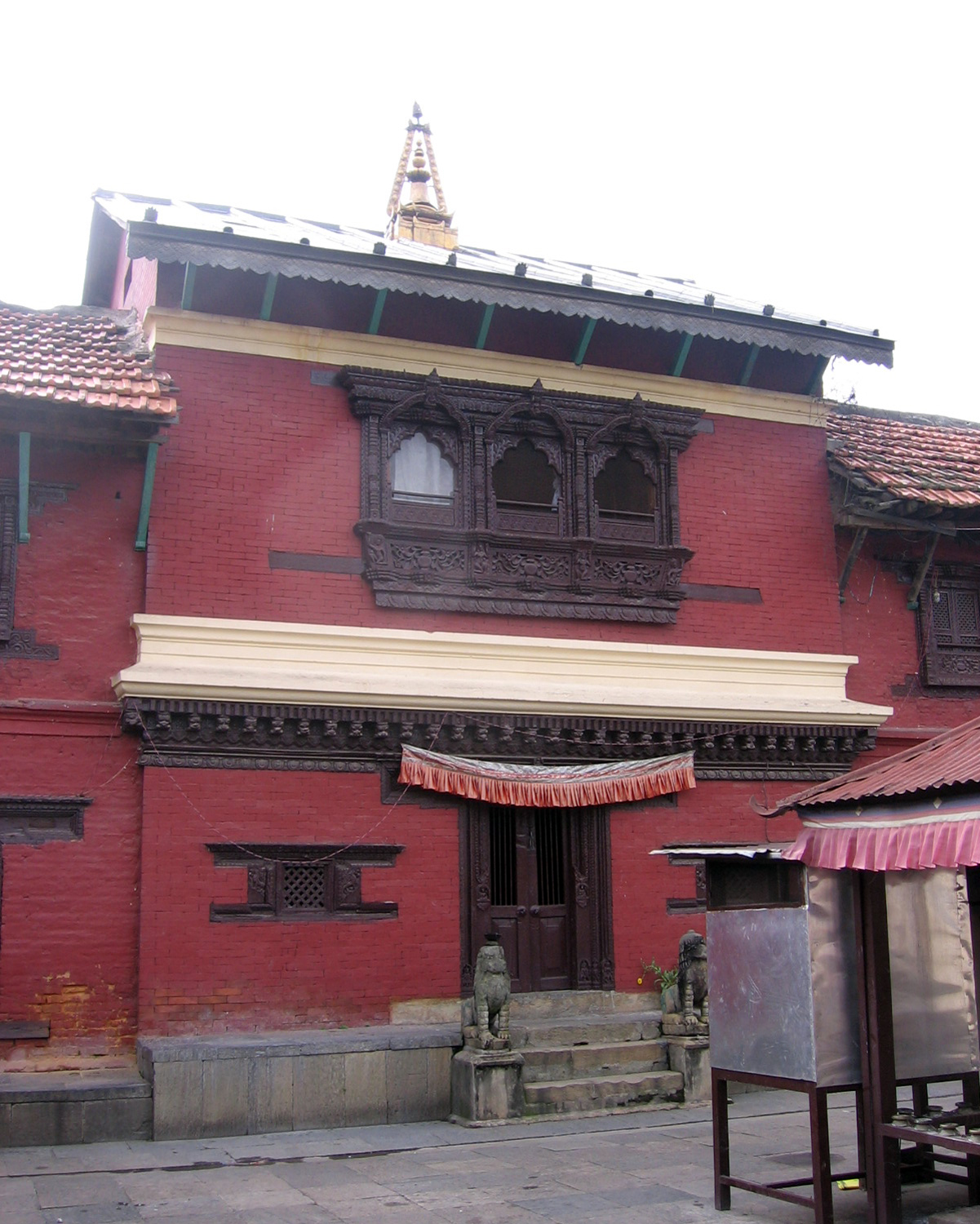
Kindo Baha, Kathmandu

Kindo Baha (Newar: किन्द्व: बहा:), also known as Kinnu Bāhā, Kindol Bāhāl or Kimdol Bāhāl, is a vihara in Kathmandu which was the hub for the resurgence of Theravada Buddhism in Nepal from the 1920s to the 1940s.

Located at the southern foot of Swayambhu, Kindo Baha was the base from where newly ordained bhikkhus began reviving teachings that had disappeared from Nepal in the 14th century.

== History ==
Kindo Baha was built in 807 Nepal Sambat (1687 AD) by one Shakyabhiksu. The king of Kathmandu Parthivendra Malla attended the inauguration ceremony. The monastery's Sanskrit name is Kirttana Mahavihara. Its popular name is derived from a holy man named Kindol who used to meditate at the site where the monastery stands. The present building dates from the 1920s when it was renovated at the initiative of Buddhist scholar and activist Dharmaditya Dharmacharya. The main image here is a statue of Buddha Akshobhya.

== Center of activity ==
A batch of monks inspired by the Theravada movement in Asia rejuvenated a dilapidated monastery into a center of religious activity. Among the key figures who resided and taught at Kindo Baha and led the Theravada renaissance were monks Dhammalok Mahasthavir, Pragyananda Mahasthavir and Kumar Kashyap Mahasthavir and nun Dharmachari Guruma. Amritananda Mahasthavir was another influential figure at Kindo Baha whose discourses were much liked by the people.

Their sermons attracted large crowds to Kindo Baha, and the monastery became a center for religious teaching and publication of literature. A suspicious government did not like what the monks were doing, and kept them under constant surveillance. In 1926, five Buddhist monks had been exiled from Nepal for conversion and making alms rounds in Kathmandu.

== Crackdown ==
The growing religious activities at Kindo Baha and the swelling congregation of the Newari faithful aroused the anger of the autocratic Rana regime. In 1944, the monks were hauled before the prime minister and ordered to stop preaching Buddhism and writing books in the Newar language. When they refused, eight monks were summarily expelled from the country.

The banishment of Buddhist monks from Nepal spurred the Theravada movement. The monks first went to India and then scattered to Sri Lanka, Bhutan, Tibet and Burma. In exile, they devoted themselves to further religious studies, and also established an organization named Dharmodaya Sabha in Sarnath, India to propagate Buddhism and publish books.

In 1946, the expulsion order was withdrawn, and they returned to Nepal. The revolutionary days of Kindo Baha also came to an end as a new monastery came up. From 1947, Ananda Kuti Vihar, originally built as a small retreat by Dhammalok on the northern slope of Swayambhu hill, became the new center of Theravada Buddhism in Nepal. After the Rana regime was overthrown in 1951, the monks could work more freely, and Theravada Buddhism spread rapidly.

== See also ==
- Bahal, Nepal
- Jana bahal
- Kwa Bahal
- Nagbahal
- Te Bahal
