= Nepal Bhasa movement =

Linguistic movement

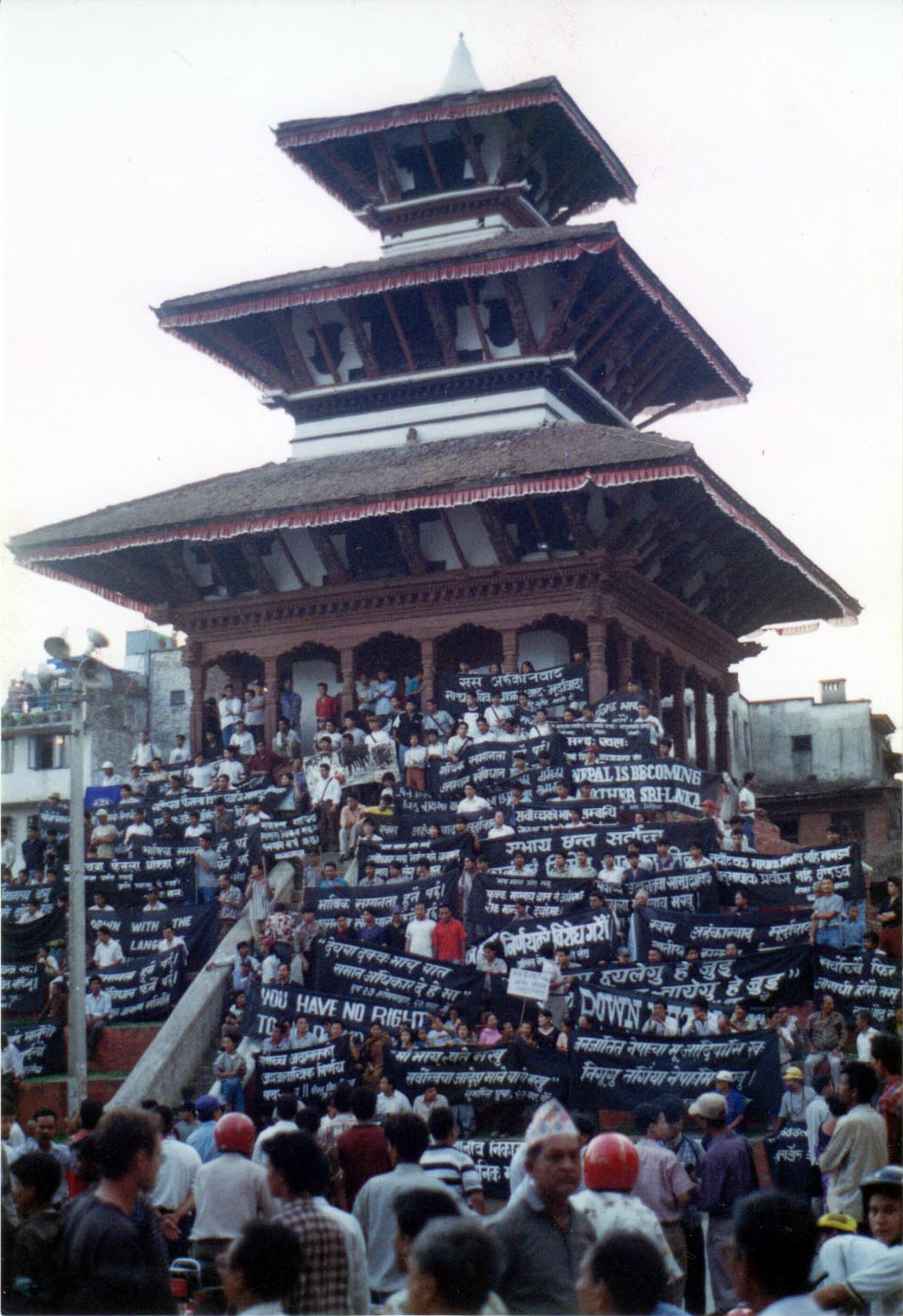
Protests are held at Kathmandu Durbar Square after the Supreme Court's verdict against Nepal Bhasa in June 1999.

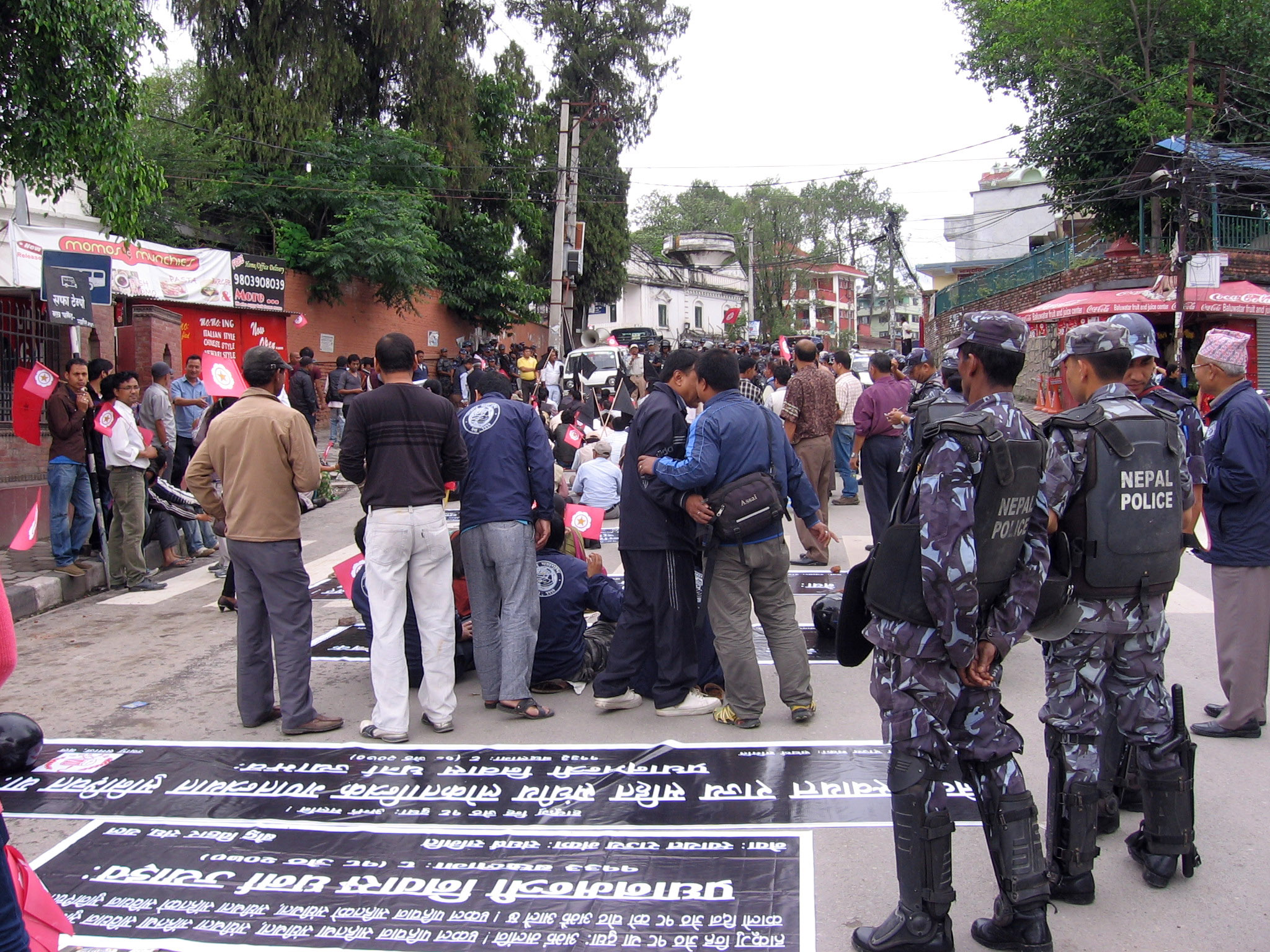
Sit-in held outside the prime minister's residence in Kathmandu to mark Black Day on 1 June 2013.

Nepal Bhasa movement (Newar: नेपालभाषा आन्दोलन) refers to the struggle for linguistic rights by Newar speakers in Nepal in the face of opposition from the government and hostile neighbors. The campaign aims to increase the use of Nepal Bhasa in the home, education, government and business. Despite a high level of development, Newar culture and language are both under threat.

Newars have been fighting to save their language from the time of the repressive Rana regime until today, and activists have been jailed, exiled and tortured. Opponents have even petitioned the Supreme Court to have its use barred. The history of Nepal Bhasa since the late 18th century has been marked by constant struggle against state repression and a hostile environment.

The movement arose against the suppression of the language by the state that began with the rise of the Shah dynasty in 1768 AD, and intensified during the Rana regime (1846–1951) and Panchayat system (1960–1990). Moreover, hostility towards the language from neighbors grew following mass migration into the Kathmandu Valley, leading to the indigenous Newars becoming a minority in their homeland. During the period 1952 to 1991, the percentage of the valley population speaking Nepal Bhasa dropped from 74.95% to 43.93%. The language has been listed as being "definitely endangered" by UNESCO.

The language movement can be divided into the following eras.

- Shah/Rana era
- First democratic era
- Panchayat era
- Second democratic era
- Loktantra era

== Shah/Rana era ==
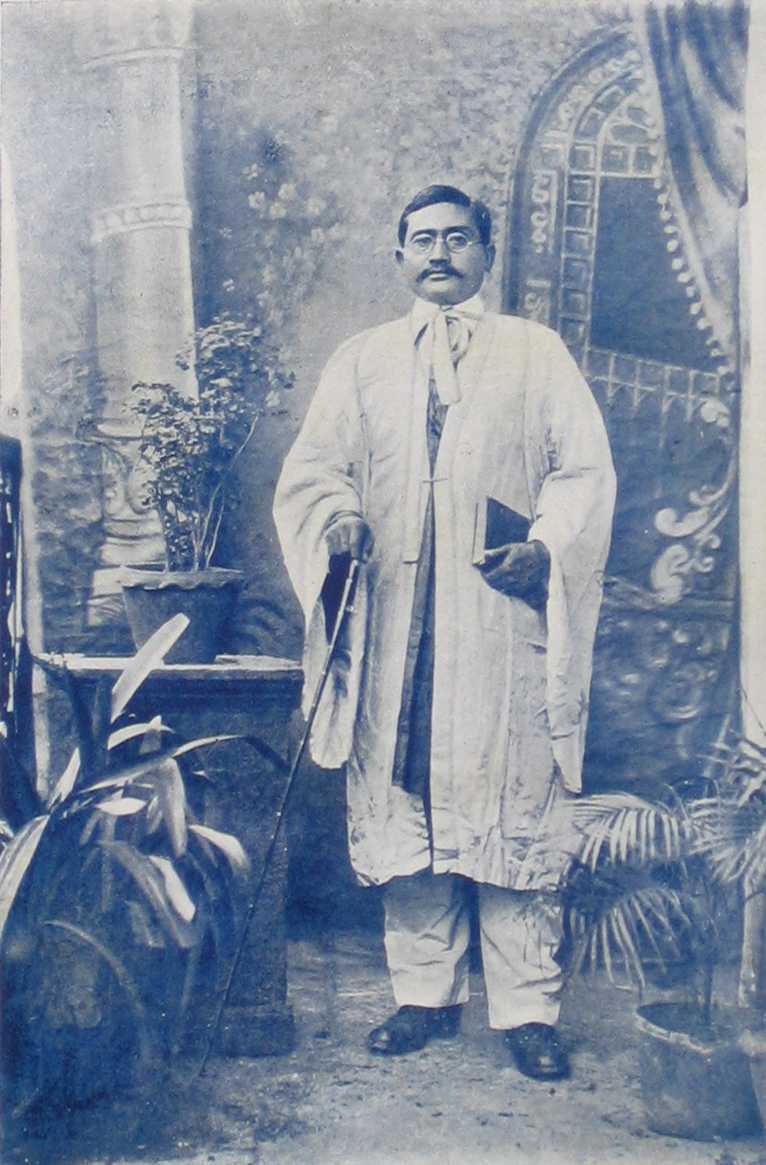
Martyr Shukra Raj Shastri wrote a grammar in 1928.

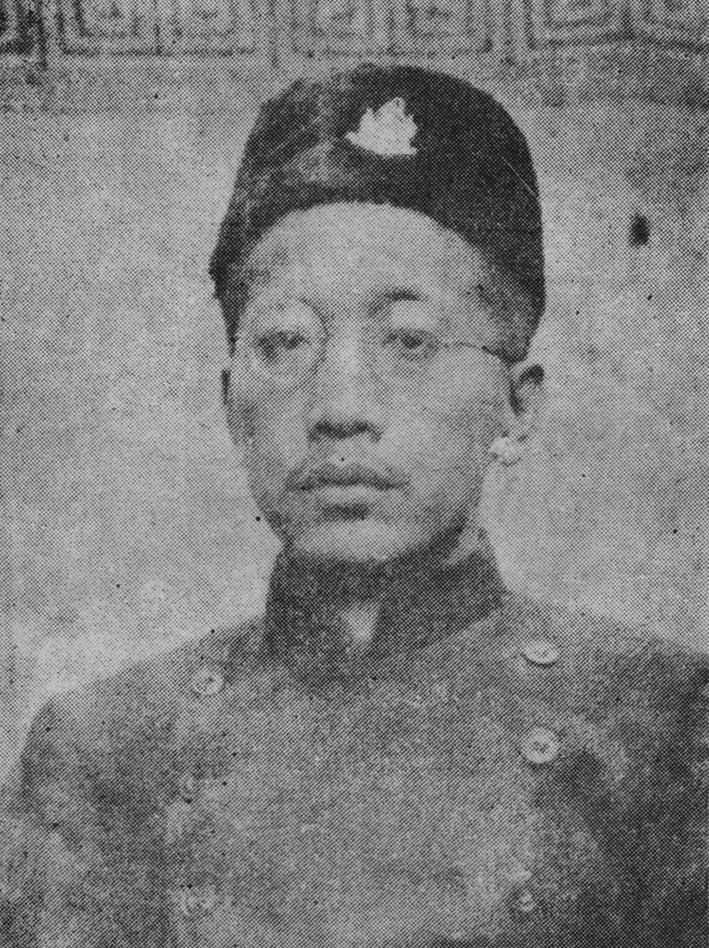
Dharmaditya was jailed for three months in 1940.

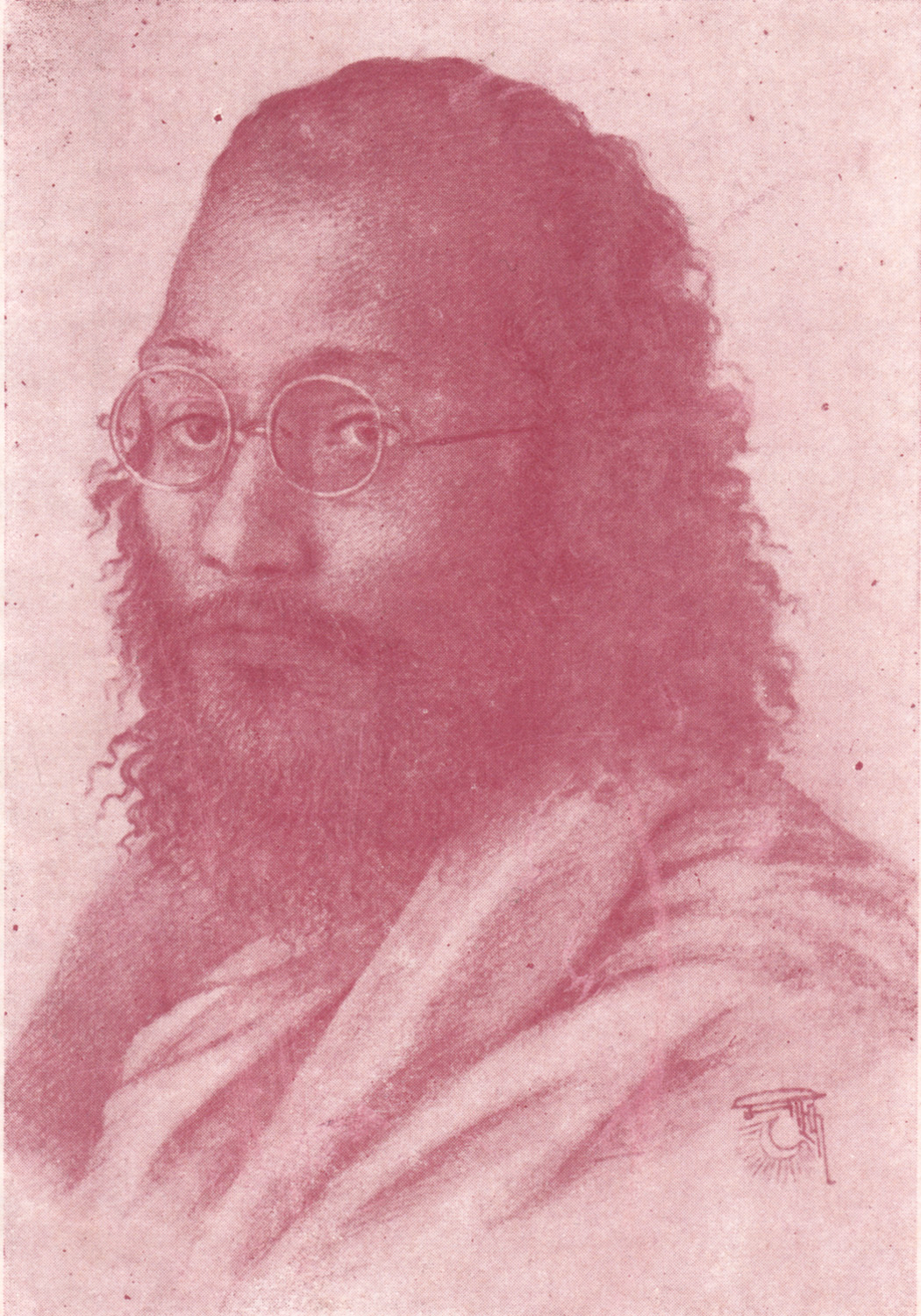
Chittadhar Hridaya, sketched in jail, ca. 1944. He was sentenced to six years for writing a poem.

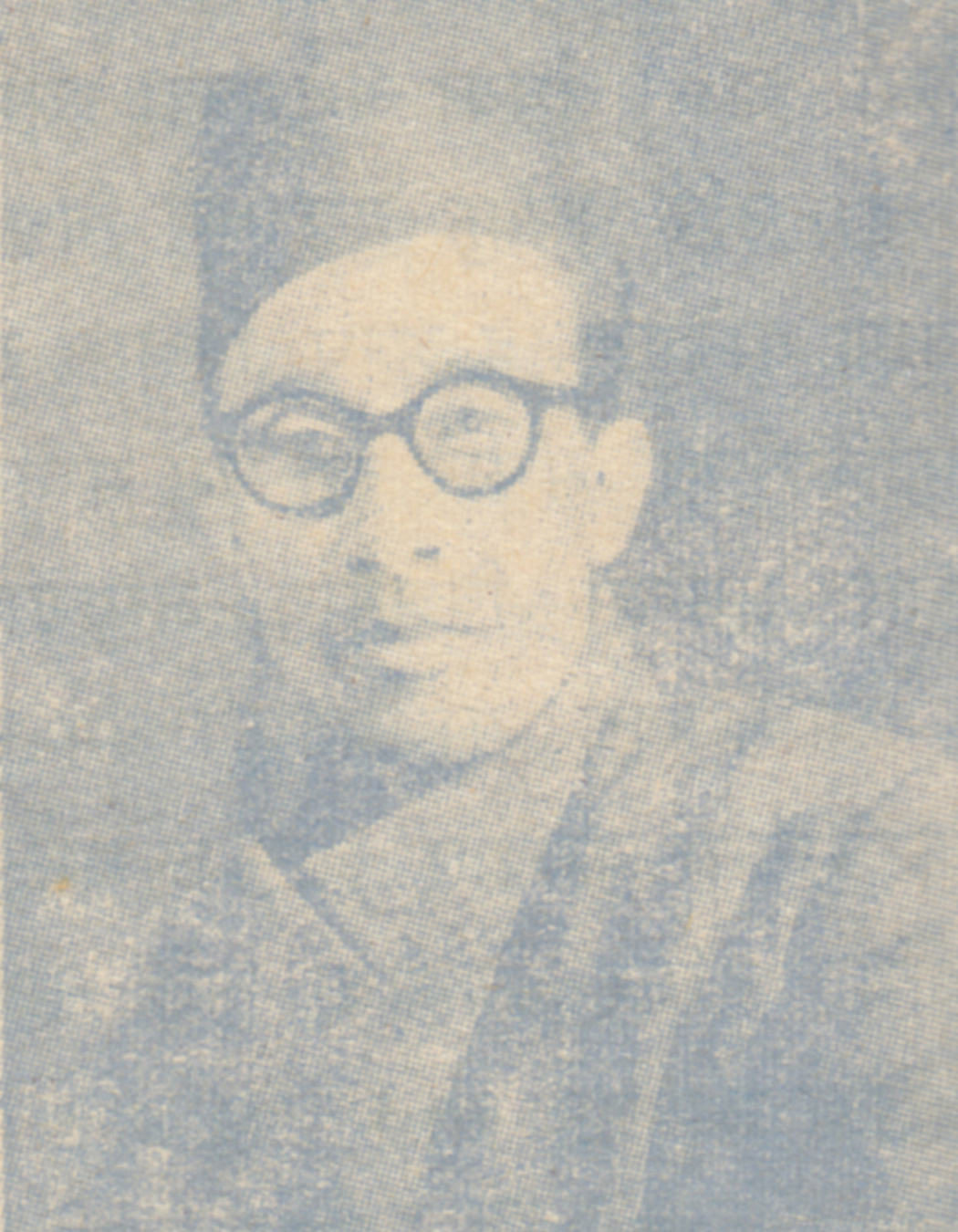
Phatte Bahadur Singh was sentenced to life in prison for publishing an anthology of poems in 1939.

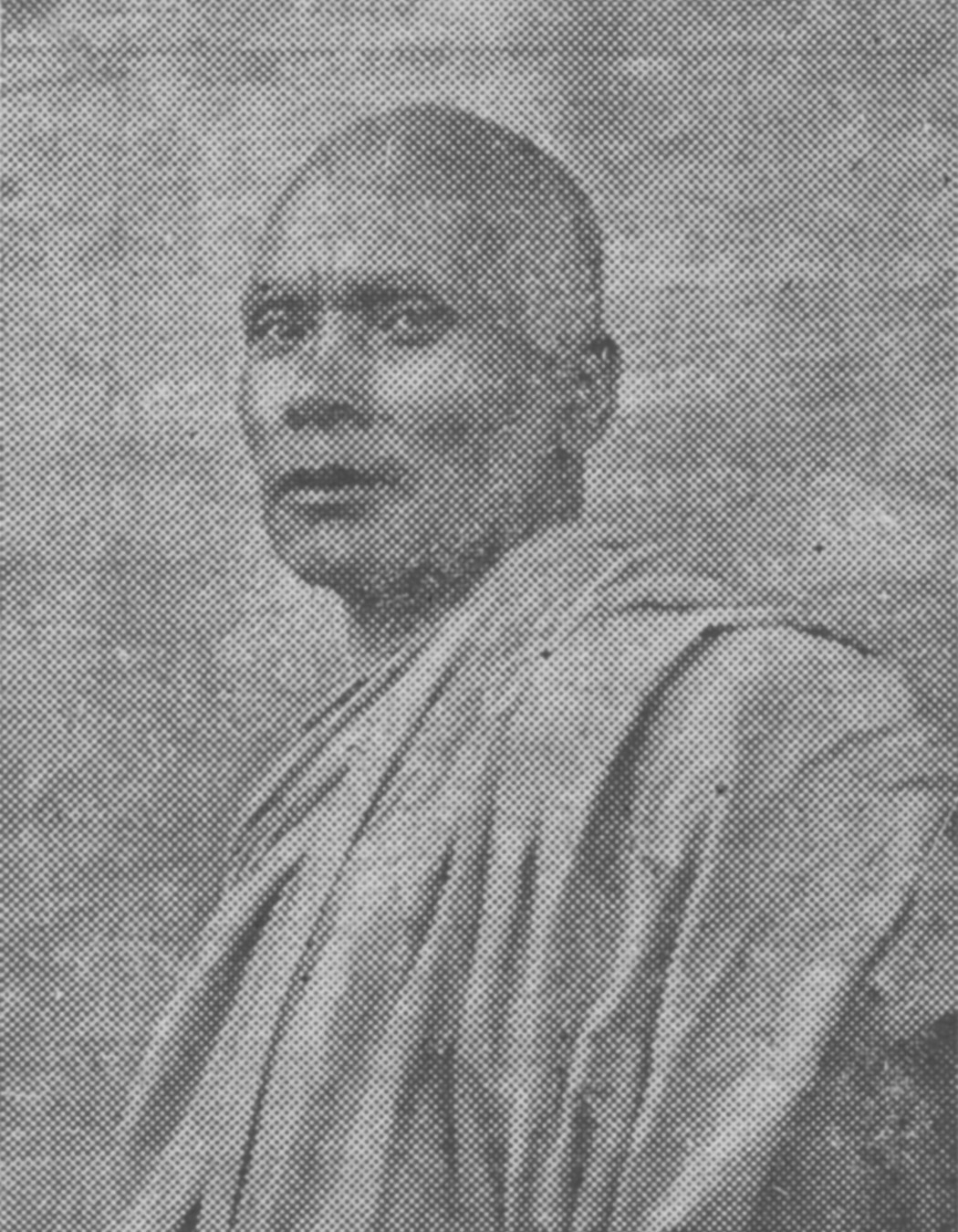
Dhammalok Mahasthavir and seven other Buddhist monks were expelled from Nepal in 1944 for writing books on Buddhism.

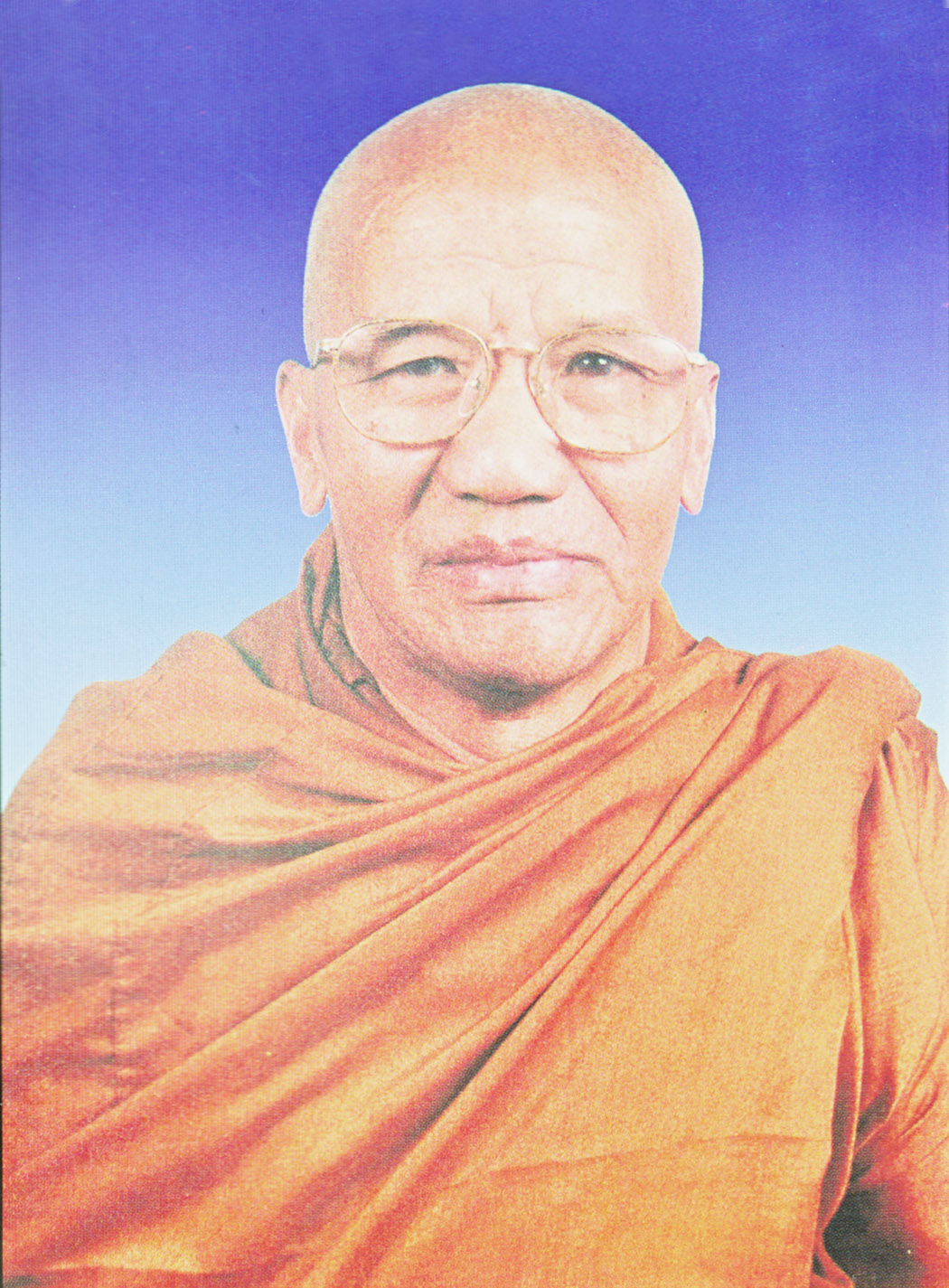
Buddhist monk Sudarshan Mahasthavir was jailed for six months in 1965 for protesting Radio Nepal's ban on Nepal Bhasa.

Following the advent of the Shahs, the Gorkha language became the court language of Nepal, and Nepal Bhasa was replaced as the language of administration. Open suppression began in 1906 with documents in Nepal Bhasa being declared not admissible in court. In the subsequent years, authors were fined, whipped, imprisoned or expelled and their books confiscated. It was illegal to sing hymns in Nepal Bhasa or speak it on the telephone. As a result, development of the language and literature was stifled.

During the period 1909 to 1941 known as the Renaissance era, a few authors braved official disapproval and started writing, translating, educating and restructuring the language. Writers Nisthananda Bajracharya, Siddhidas Mahaju, Jagat Sundar Malla and Yogbir Singh Kansakar are honored as the Four Pillars of Nepal Bhasa. Shukraraj Shastri and Dharmaditya Dharmacharya were also at the forefront of the movement.

In 1909, Bajracharya published the first printed book using movable type. Shastri wrote a grammar of the language entitled Nepal Bhasa Vyakarana which was published from Kolkata, India in 1928. Dharmacharya published the first magazine in Nepal Bhasa Buddha Dharma wa Nepal Bhasa from Kolkata in 1925. Also, the Renaissance marked the beginning of the movement to get official recognition for the name "Nepal Bhasa" in place of the Khas imposed term "Newari".

=== Writers jailed ===
In 1940, the government mounted a crackdown against democracy activists and writers in which Shukraraj Shastri was hanged. A large number of authors were imprisoned for their literary or political activities. Dharmacharya was jailed for three months. Chittadhar Hridaya was sentenced to six years, Siddhicharan Shrestha was sentenced to 18 years, Phatte Bahadur Singh was sentenced to life imprisonment and Dharma Ratna Yami was sentenced to 18 years. They were released in 1945 after serving five years. In prison, Hridaya produced his greatest work Sugata Saurabha, an epic poem on the life of the Buddha. Shrestha wrote a collection of poems entitled Seeswan ("Wax Flower", published in 1948) among other works.

=== Monks expelled ===
Theravada Buddhist monks stood up to the Rana regime and published books on Buddhism from India and brought them into Nepal. This led to the Banishment of Buddhist monks from Nepal. In 1944, eight monks were expelled for refusing to stop teaching Theravada Buddhism and writing in Nepal Bhasa. In 1946, the ban on writing was lifted, and the monks were allowed to return to Nepal following international pressure. Their writings and public activities in Nepal Bhasa had a profound impact on the development of the language.

=== Working abroad ===
Nepal Bhasa lovers took the movement to India and Tibet where they formed associations to organize writers and bring out publications to escape government suppression in Nepal. Newar merchants based in Kolkata, Kalimpong and Lhasa were major patrons of the language movement.

Buddha Dharma wa Nepal Bhasa, the first ever magazine in Nepal Bhasa, was published from Kolkata in 1925 by Dharmaditya Dharmacharya. He also established a literary organization named Nepal Bhasa Sahitya Mandal (Nepal Bhasa Literature Organization) in 1926.

In 1944, the Buddhist monks expelled from Nepal went to Sarnath and formed an organization named Dharmodaya Sabha. In 1947, it launched Dharmodaya magazine from Kalimpong funded by trader Maniharsha Jyoti Kansakar. Monk Aniruddha Mahathera was the first editor.

Newar traders based in Lhasa promoted Thaunkanhe magazine which launched in Kathmandu in 1951. It was the first Nepal Bhasa magazine to be published from Nepal, and the first editor was a former merchant Purna Kaji Tamrakar.

In 1950, a literary society named Chwasa Pasa (Pen Friend) was formed in Kolkata by Prem Bahadur Kansakar and another writer Madan Lochan Singh to bring together writers living in exile. The society moved to Nepal in 1951 after the advent of democracy.

== First democratic era ==
Following the fall of the Ranas and advent of democracy in 1951, there was greater linguistic freedom, and Nepal Bhasa struggled to catch up. Books, magazines and newspapers appeared. A daily newspaper Nepal Bhasa Patrika began publication in 1955.

=== On the radio ===
State-owned Radio Nepal began broadcasting the news in Nepal Bhasa once a day in 1951. In 1958, Kathmandu Municipality passed a resolution that it would accept applications and publish major decisions in Nepal Bhasa in addition to the Nepali language.

=== In schools and colleges ===
Nepal Bhasa entered a vibrant phase in the educational system. It was included in the curriculum, and Nepal Rastriya Vidhyapitha recognized it as an alternative medium of instruction in the schools and colleges affiliated to it. In 1953, the government recognized Nepal Bhasa as a spoken language and an oriental language subject. The Nepal Educational Council adopted it as an optional subject.

Following lobbying by language lovers, Nepal Bhasa was included in the course of study at the high school level in 1954, at the intermediate level in 1960 and bachelor level in 1962. And for two decades, Nepal Bhasa was widely taught in schools and colleges in the Kathmandu Valley and other parts of Nepal with thousands of students studying it as an optional subject.

== Panchayat era ==
In 1960, parliament was abolished, political parties were forbidden and the Panchayat system was established. Under this autocratic system, the government followed a one-language policy, and Nepal Bhasa suffered another period of suppression. It was gradually pushed out of the media and the educational institutions, triggering protest movements.

The restrictive policy of Panchayat encouraged the formation of literary associations to provide a forum for writers to present their works. In 1962, Birat Nepal Bhasa Sahitya Sammelan Guthi (Grand Nepal Bhasa Literary Conference Trust) was formed in Bhaktapur. It organized annual literary meets which continue until today.

=== Jah magazine ===
In 1960, Nepal Bhasa students at Tri-Chandra College in Kathmandu launched an annual magazine named Jah (ज:) (meaning "light" in Nepal Bhasa) after the college magazine Light refused to include Nepal Bhasa articles in it. The magazine led to the organization of students interested in Nepal Bhasa in the college. That same year, they started the annual Inter-College Nepal Bhasa Literary Conference and also produced a weekly radio program in Nepal Bhasa on Radio Nepal named Jeevan Dabu ("Life's stage"). In the successive years, Jah served as a breeding ground for new writers and language activists.

=== Movement of 1965 ===
In 1963, Kathmandu Municipality's decision to recognize Nepal Bhasa was revoked. In 1965, the language was banned from being broadcast over Radio Nepal. The removal of Nepal Bhasa from the country's only radio station sparked a protest movement which became known as the Movement of 1965 ("Bais Salya Andolan"). The protest took the form of literary meets as other types of demonstrations were prohibited. Literary programs were held weekly in market squares and courtyards where participants recited poems and sang songs containing critical messages.

The government cracked down by putting a number of activists in jail including writers Mangal Man Shakya, Pushpa Gopal Shrestha and Shree Krishna Anu. Buddhist monk Bhikshu Sudarshan Mahasthavir was jailed for six months and six days. Other prominent campaigners like Durga Lal Shrestha, Hitkar Bir Singh Kansakar and Mangal Man Shakya (of Om Bahal) were forced to go underground. The movement was made leaderless, and it came to a stop after a year.

The ban on Nepal Bhasa remained, but the 1965 Movement succeeded in raising awareness about linguistic rights and arousing public opinion against the Panchayat regime. Its most important achievement was creating a new generation of writers and campaigners who would take over from the activists who fought for the language during the Rana regime and lead the movement in the subsequent decades. Nepal Bhasa Manka Khala, founded in 1979, is one of the organizations that emerged during this period to struggle for language rights.

=== Out of school ===
The New Education System Plan brought out in 1971 disrupted the popular study of Nepal Bhasa in educational institutions. Under the plan, vernacular subjects were removed from the curriculum, and students were forced to choose between the mother tongue and technical subjects, leading to Nepal Bhasa being pushed into the background. Student enrolment in the course dropped, resulting in the subject being pulled out of many schools and a further decline in students.

From 1977, students could study Nepal Bhasa at the Master's level; but the university degree was not counted for promotion by the government, and so there were few takers for the subject.

=== Foreign radio ===
In addition to government suppression, Nepal Bhasa has faced opposition from hostile critics. After Sri Lanka Broadcasting Corporation began broadcasting a weekly half-hour program in Nepal Bhasa on 6 November 1983, opponents in Nepal pressured the radio station to shut it down. Similar opposition led to All India Radio – Kurseong stopping broadcasting Nepal Bhasa songs during its Nepali service in 1966.

== Second democratic era ==
Arbitrary actions increased resentment towards Panchayat. In 1988, police arrested participants in a procession marking the birth anniversary of Nepal Bhasa poet Siddhidas Mahaju.

After the 1990 People's Movement that brought the Panchayat system to an end, the languages of Nepal enjoyed greater freedom. However, efforts to get Nepal Bhasa reincluded as an optional subject after a gap of two decades were unsuccessful due to lack of funding.

The 1990 constitution recognized Nepal as a multi-ethnic and multilingual country. It also said that each community shall have the right to operate schools up to the primary level in its own mother tongue. However, the government's responsibility was not stated and communities had to open such schools on their own. In 1991, Jagat Sundar Bwane Kuthi, the first Nepal Bhasa-medium school, opened in Kathmandu with the efforts of volunteers and the support of domestic and foreign donors.

Meanwhile, years of efforts to gain official recognition for the standard name Nepal Bhasa finally succeeded. On 8 September 1995, the government decided that the name Nepal Bhasa should be used instead of Newari. However, the Central Bureau of Statistics has not been doing so.

=== Critics file suit ===
On 25 July 1997, Kathmandu Metropolitan City declared that its policy to recognize Nepal Bhasa, which had been passed on 18 April 1958 and cancelled by the Panchayat regime in 1963, would be revived. The rest of the city governments in the Kathmandu Valley announced in quick succession that they too would officially recognize Nepal Bhasa – Lalitpur Sub-Metropolitan City on 14 July, Bhaktapur Municipality on 23 July, Madhyapur Thimi Municipality on 10 September, Banepa Municipality on 7 October, Dhulikhel Municipality on 10 October, and Kirtipur Municipality on 15 September 1997.

While Newars hailed the move, its detractors went to court. A group consisting of Lal Bahadur Thapa, Yagyanidhi Dahal, Hari Prasad Pokhrel, Achyut Raman Adhikari and Dhruba Raj Thebe filed a joint petition at the Supreme Court of Nepal against their decision. And on 18 March 1998, the Supreme Court issued a stay order preventing Kathmandu Metropolitan City from using Nepal Bhasa pending a final verdict.

Subsequently, on 1 June 1999, the Supreme Court quashed the decision of the local bodies as being unconstitutional. After the verdict was announced, demonstrators marched through Kathmandu in protest.

=== Black Day ===
Newars have been observing 1 June as Black Day with protest meets and public demonstrations recalling the day when the Supreme Court barred Nepal Bhasa from being used in local bodies. On some occasions, the protests have been marked by vandalism and arrest of protestors by the police.

== Loktantra era ==
A second People's Movement in 2006 ousted the Shah dynasty and Nepal became a republic which gave the people greater linguistic freedom. The 2007 Interim Constitution stated that the use of one's mother tongue in a local body or office shall not be barred. However, subtle discrimination persists. Organizations with names in Nepal Bhasa are not registered, and municipality officials refuse to accept applications written in the language.

== See also ==
- Nepal Bhasa
- Nepal Bhasa literature
- Nepal Bhasa journalism
- Nepal Bhasa renaissance
- Linguistic rights
