= Nepal Bhasa renaissance =

Movement to revive and modernize the Nepal Bhasa language

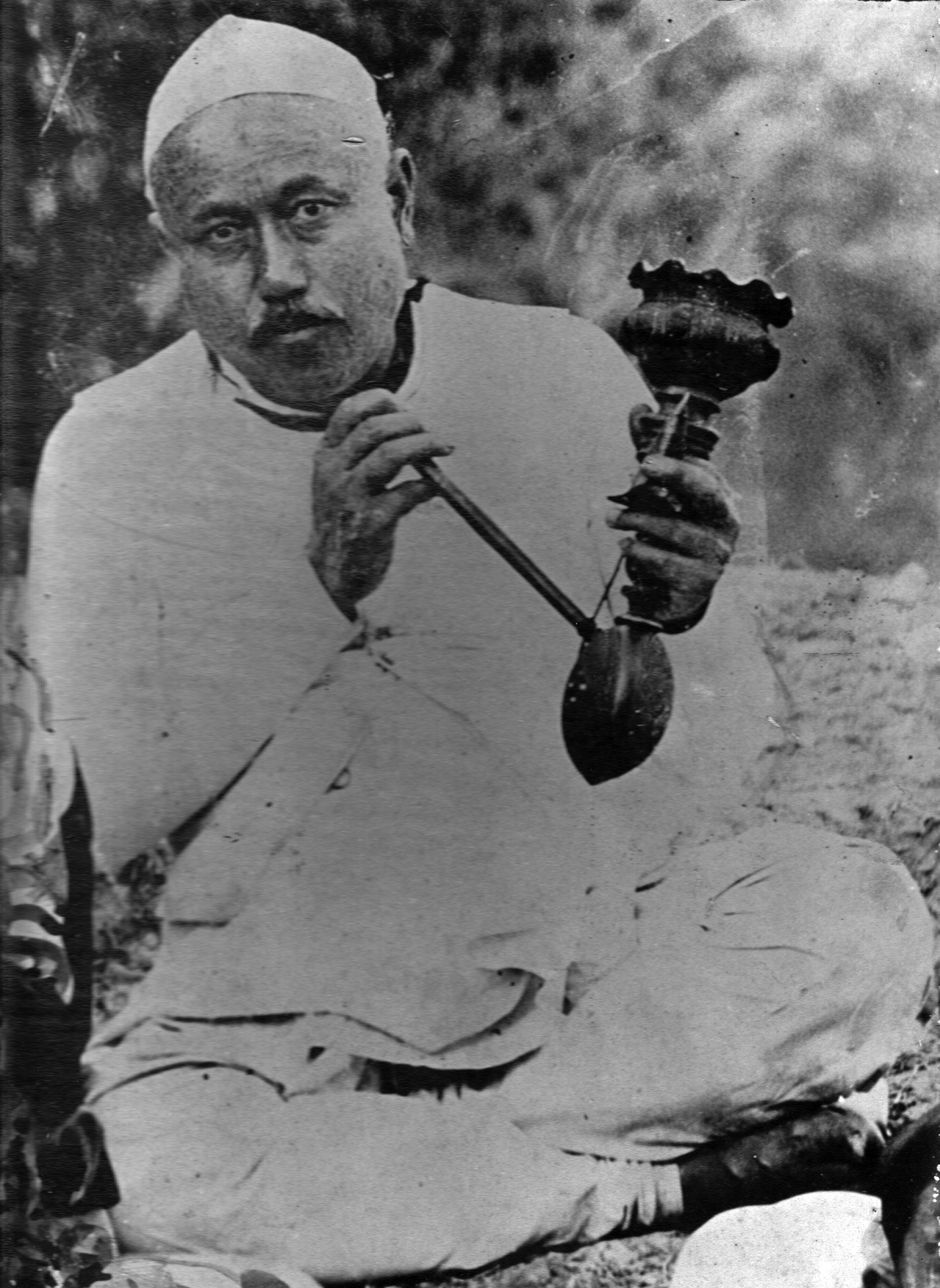
Yogbir Singh Kansakar

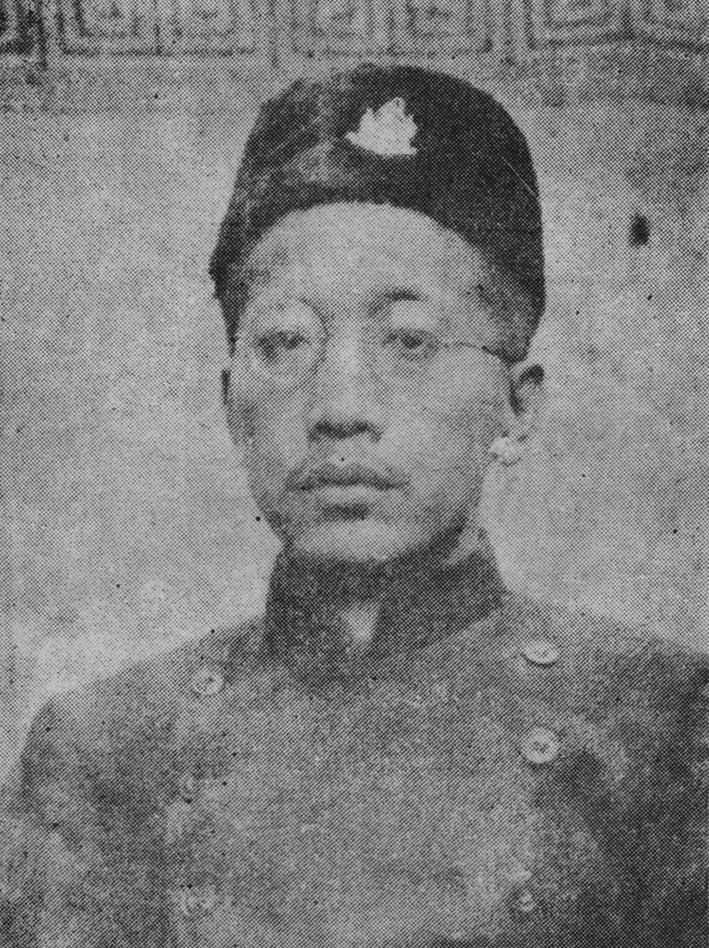
Dharmacharya in ca 1930.

Nepal Bhasa renaissance (Nepal Bhasa: नेपालभाषा पुनर्जागरण) was the movement to revive and modernize the Nepal Bhasa language during the period 1909 to 1941. The movement was spontaneous and not orchestrated. However, the sum total of activities conducted during this era had a profound impact on the overall course of the language development.

== Factors and influences ==
Many factors had an impact in the Nepal Bhasa renaissance, including:

- the repression of Nepal Bhasa and its banning from official use by the Rana regime;
- the first generation of modern Nepalese scholars' attempts to modernize the Nepal Bhasa language;
- Hindu and Buddhist literary movements in India and Nepal;
- The regional language movement of Bengal

== Renaissance figures ==
The most prominent people of this era were

- Nisthananda Bajracharya
- Siddhidas Mahaju
- Jagat Sundar Malla
- Yogbir Singh Kansakar
- Shukraraj Shastri, one of the four martyrs of the Nepalese revolution that toppled the Rana regime
- Dharmaditya Dharmacharya

Nisthananda, Siddhidas, Jagat Sundar and Yogbir Singh are considered as the Four Pillars of Nepal Bhasa.

== Activities ==
Various activities marked the renaissance era.

=== Publication ===
Nisthananda Bajracharya authored and printed the first printed book in Nepal Bhasa called Ek Binshati Pragyaparmita in 1909. He brought printing type from Kolkata, did the typesetting, proof-reading and printing himself.

=== Standardization of grammar ===
Shukraraj Shastri's grammar book published in 1928.

Sukraraj Shastri published the first grammar book in Nepal Bhasa (in N.S. 1048, Kaulaathwa 10) called "Nepalbhasa byakaran". Before that, grammar was limited to manuscripts and traditional teachings with wide variability. This publication initiated a standardization of grammar. Publication of Nepal Bhasa reader aided in further standardization of vocabulary.

The publication of dictionary and English-Nepal Bhasa translation by Jagat Sundar Malla helped in standardization of vocabulary.

=== Translation ===
To increase the literary treasure of the language, translations of various literature was initiated in this era. Some of them are as follows

- Lalitvistara, a Sanskrit Buddhist text based on the Buddha's life story was translated by Nisthananda Bajracharya, one of the four pillars of Nepal Bhasa during this era.
- Hindu epic Ramayan by Siddhidas Mahaju,
- Aesop's fables by Jagat Sundar Malla

=== Education ===
Jagat Sundar Malla was a pioneer of modern education. He turned his own house into a free school. To overcome the lack of teaching materials, he wrote many course books himself, including an English-Nepal Bhasa-English dictionary and translated Aesop's Fables in 1915 into Nepal Bhasa. Poet Yogbir Singh Kansakar stressed female education.

=== Research ===
Scientific research on the language began in this period. It was identified that Nepal Bhasa is a Sino-Tibetan language and not an Indo-Aryan language (as was believed) in this era. Various ancient manuscripts were collected and researched during this era.

=== Literature ===
Modern literature was introduced into Nepal Bhasa during this era. Modern prose and poetry were established and epic writing were firmly reestablished during this era.

=== Activism and identity ===
Renaissance marked the revival of the term "Nepal Bhasa" to name the language rather than the Khas imposed term "Newari". Figures like Dhammaditya Dhammacharya were active and conscious about the proper nomenclature of the language.

== Literary samples ==
Some of the lines from Sajjan Hridayabharan of Siddhidas Mahaju (N.S.987-N.S.1050) read as follows

सज्जन मनुष्या संगतनं मूर्ख नापं भिना वै
पलेला लपते ल वंसा म्वति थें ल सना वै

This states that even a moron can improve with the company of good people, just as a drop of water appears like a pearl when it falls on the leaves of a lotus plant.

== Impact ==
Much of the literary activities conducted in modern era were a propagation of the activities initiated in this era. The era created a new breed of modern writers. Unlike medieval era or dark era writers, these writers were commoners and not aristocrats. Hence, literature reached the grass-roots level of society. Some of the most prominent impacts of the activities of this era are

- The epic Sugata Saurabha by Chittadhar Hridaya is the greatest epic written in the language along the lines of Nisthananda Bajracharya.
- The Nepal Bhasa movement which helped establish Nepal Bhasa as a national language of Nepal after the 2006 democratic movement was along the lines of the movement of Dharmaditya Dharmacharya.

== See also ==
- Nepal alphabets
- Nepal Bhasa literature
- Nepal Bhasa journalism
- Buddha Dharma wa Nepal Bhasa (magazine)
- Dharmodaya
- Revolution of 1951
