= Nepal Bhasa journalism =

Publications in the Newar language

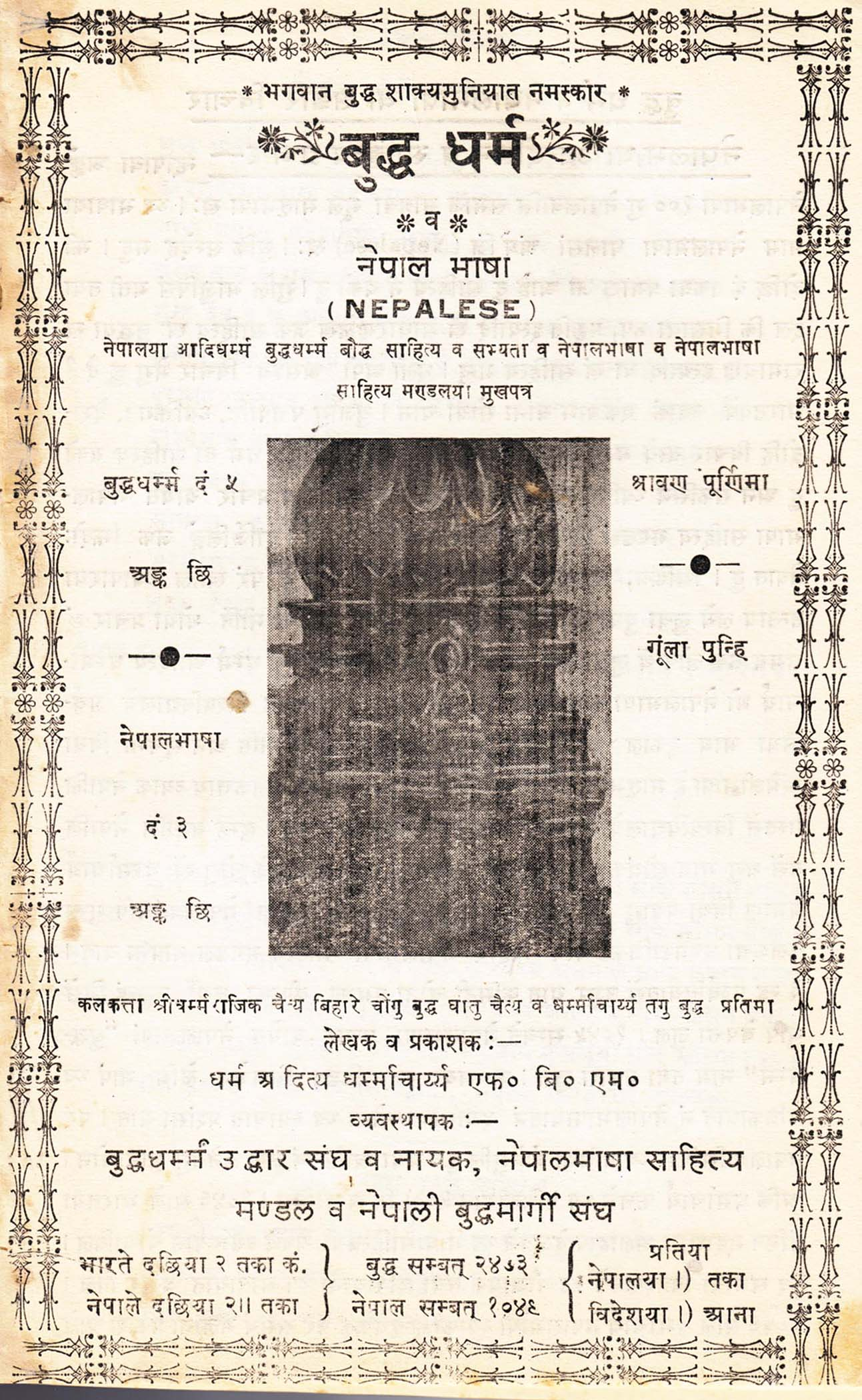
Cover of Buddha Dharma wa Nepal Bhasa Vol. 5, No. 1 issue dated August 1929.

Nepal Bhasa journalism began in 1925 with the publication of the magazine Buddha Dharma wa Nepal Bhasa (Devanagari: बुद्ध धर्म व नॆपाल भाषा). It was the first magazine to be published in Nepal Bhasa. It was published from Kolkata, India by Dharmaditya Dharmacharya.

== Magazines ==
Newar, Newari, or Nepal Bhasa, is a Sino-Tibetan language spoken by the Newar people, the indigenous inhabitants of Nepal Mandala, the Kathmandu Valley and surrounding regions in Nepal.

Although "Nepal Bhasa" literally means "Nepalese language", the language is not the same as Nepali (Devanāgarī: नेपाली), the country's current official language. Dharmacharya (1902-1963) was the first Nepal Bhasa journalist. He served as editor and also wrote many of the articles in Buddha Dharma wo Nepal Bhasa. It was published in India instead of Nepal as the Rana dynasty disapproved of any attempt to promote either the religion or the language.

Originally named Buddha Dharma, the magazine's editorial policy later expanded from publicizing Theravada Buddhism to developing Nepal Bhasa. In 1927, its name was changed to Buddha Dharma wo Nepal Bhasa (Buddha Dharma and Nepal Bhasa), and it began including creative works in Nepal Bhasa too. The magazine folded in 1930. Dharmacharya was born Jagat Man Vaidya in Lalitpur.

Dharmodaya was a monthly magazine which launched in October 1947 A.D in Kalimpong. It was published by Maniharsha Jyoti for Dharmodaya Sabha, an organization formed by Buddhist monks who had been expelled from Nepal in 1944 for promoting Theravada Buddhism. The first editors were monks Aniruddha and Mahanam Kobid. Dharmodaya had a major effect on standardizing the language. From 1949 to 1960, it was published from Kolkata. In 1977, the magazine was again published from Kalimpong with Bhaichand Pradhan as editor and Tara Upasak as publisher on behalf of Kalimpong Dharmodaya Sabha.

In 1951, Thaunkanhe (Newar: थौंकन्हे) (meaning "Nowadays"), the first Nepal Bhasa magazine to be published in Nepal, was launched. The monthly began publication on 21 May 1951 in Kathmandu and is still in print. The founding editor, deputy editor and publisher were Purna Kaji Tamrakar, Pushpa Ratna Sagar and Ratna Man Singh Tuladhar respectively.

In 1952, a literary quarterly Nepal appeared, published by Nepal Bhasa Parisad (Nepal Bhasa Council). The first editor was Hridaya Chandra Singh Pradhan. It is one of the major publications that emerged during the post-democracy period.

Another early literary magazine was Jhee (Devanagari: झी) (meaning "We") which ran from 1958 to 1985. It was edited by Mohan Narayan and published by Nepal Bhasa Bikas Mandal (Nepal Bhasa Development Organization) from Kathmandu.

Situ (Devanagari: सितु) (meaning "Holy Grass") was a bimonthly published from 1964 to 1991. It was a purely literary magazine. It was edited by Prem Bahadur Kansakar and published by Chwasa Pasa. Situ helped to launch a host of new writers.

== Newspapers ==
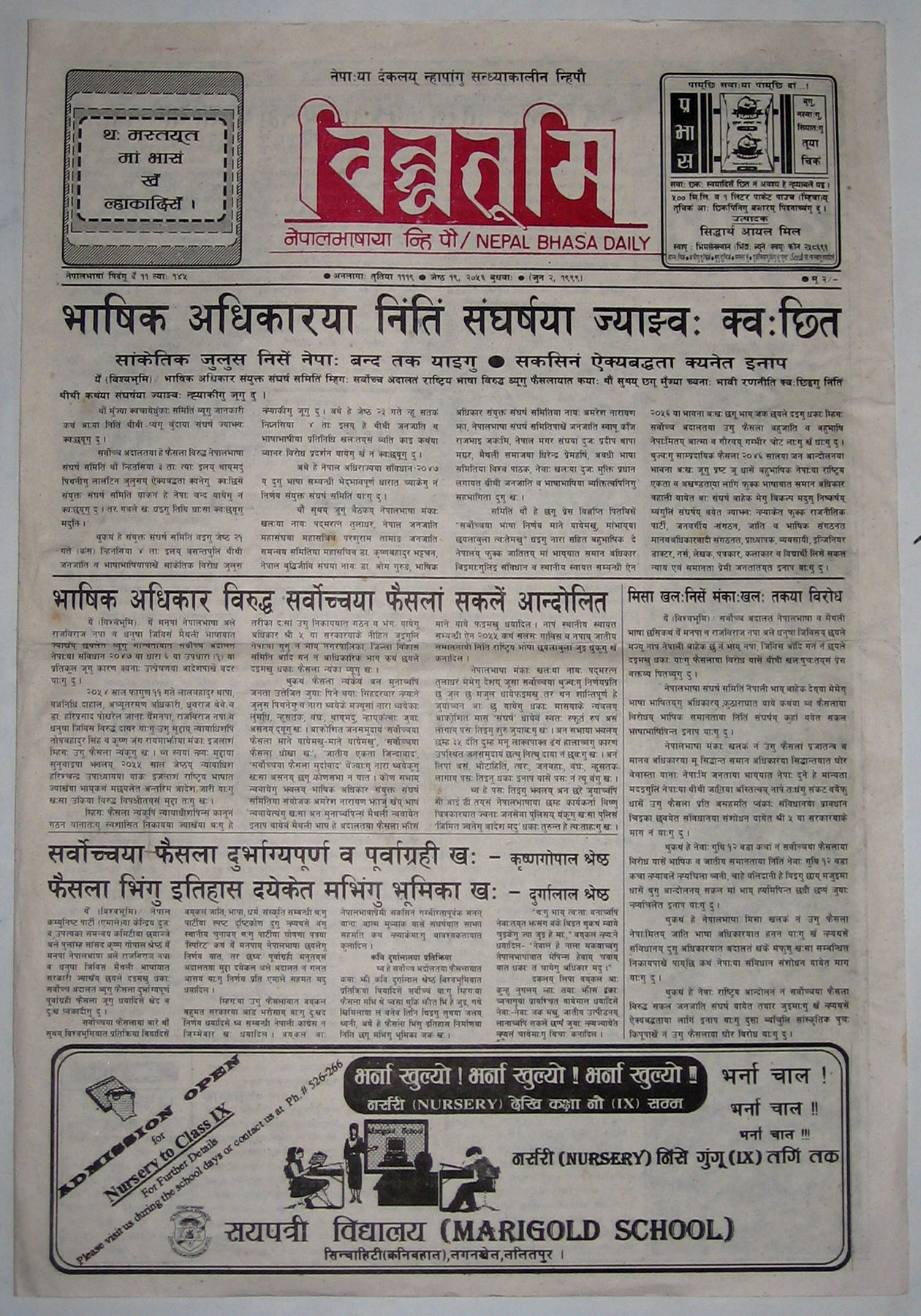
Scan of Biswabhumi daily dated 2 June 1999.

The first daily newspaper in Nepal Bhasa was Nepal Bhasa Patrika which was published from Kathmandu on 28 September 1955. The first editor was Phatte Bahadur Singh. The daily ceased publication in 1983.

In 1953, a weekly named Pasa (Devanagari: पासा) (meaning "Friend") appeared. It was published by Chwasa Pasa ("Pen Friend"), a literary organization. Chwasa Pasa was formed in Kolkata in 1950 by exiled writers Prem Bahadur Kansakar and Madan Lochan Singh. After the Rana regime was pulled down and democracy established in 1951, the organization relocated to Kathmandu. In 1957, Pasa was published daily for three months when Krishna Chandra Singh Pradhan was the editor.

In 1983, a weekly newspaper Rajamati (Devanagari: राजमति) was published from Lalitpur. It was brought out by Dharma Ratna Shakya and was originally published in the Nepali language.

Inap (Devanagari: इनाप) appeared the same year, edited and published by Krishna Sundar Malla (Malla K. Sundar). It helped to create a new generation of journalists and was influential in arousing language awareness among Nepal Bhasa speakers. Inap (meaning "Appeal") was in publication from 1983 until 1996.

Biswabhumi, an eveninger formerly published in the Nepali language, began publication in Nepal Bhasa in 1987. Edited by Ashok Shrestha, it was the first evening daily in Nepal. During the 1990 People's Movement for democracy, it gained massive popularity for its coverage of breaking news. The daily remained in publication until 1999.

Shrestha left Biswabhumi and brought out another eveninger named Nhugu Biswabhumi (meaning "New Biswabhumi") in 1992.

Presently, there are five dailies, 12 weeklies and one biweekly being published in Nepal Bhasa. Lahana Weekly newspaper, नेपालभाषाया वाःपौ ‘लहना’ starts with color layout by March 12, 2014. To Lahana Newspaper, Krishna Kaji Manandhar (KK Manandhar, कृष्णकाजी मानन्धर) was appointed as editor in chief and sub editor as Jujuman Maharjan. Surendra Bhakta Shrestha as Manager and Nripendra Lal Shrestha as Publicer. It was publicized for Tayaju Publication Pvt. Ltd and president for Tayaju is Sahanshila Manandhar (Shila Sayami). All of them are published from the Kathmandu Valley, except for Hetauda Wapau, a weekly which is published from Hetauda. Sandhya Times (daily), Jheegu Swanigah (daily), Apsara, Desay Madu Jhyaa, Newa Post, Page 3 and Layaku are some of the major publications.

== Radio and television ==
Radio broadcasting in Nepal Bhasa started on 18 January 1951 over Nepal Radio broadcasting from Biratnagar in eastern Nepal. The first newsreader was Gajadhar Bhakta.

Nepal Radio was the forerunner of the state-owned Radio Nepal which was set up in Kathmandu on 1 April 1951. Radio Nepal began broadcasting the news in Nepal Bhasa once a day soon after its establishment. In 1960, the station added a weekly program entitled Jeevan Dabu ("Life's Stage"). The 15-minute program was dedicated to music, literature, and culture.

Following the abolition of the parliamentary system and establishment of the Panchayat system and its "one country, one language" policy, the daily news bulletin was stopped on 13 April 1965. Jeevan Dabu was discontinued in 1971. The daily news program in Nepal Bhasa was revived after the reinstatement of democracy in 1990.

In 2012, besides Radio Nepal, there were more than 15 private FM radio stations in the Kathmandu Valley and four national television networks broadcasting programs in Nepal Bhasa.

In 2007 (२०६४ भाद्र) Nepal Bhasa News starts in Sagarmatha Television, Nepal's First News Channel. Within these period three energetic youth Krishna Kaji Manandhar (KK Manandhar), Raju Napit and Shreesna Sthapit started Nepal Bhasa News bulletin for 30 minutes. The news bulletin called सगरमाथा बुखँ।

Krishna Kaji Manandhar (KK Manandhar) (Nepali : कृष्ण काजी मानन्धर ) is still in media as diversity media practicener.

Birth Date : August 21, 1980.

Krishna Kaji Manandhar is a Media Personality, Regarded one of the significant icon, works for Lecturer (Khopa College and Binayak Sikshya Niketan), News Presenter (Image Channel Television still now), film maker as art director, documentary maker.

His versatile character allowed him to practice all types of media works as feature writing for papers and magazines, trainer for workshops, public Speaking, Leadership, Organizational environment, journalism and mass communication.

=== Foreign stations ===
Sri Lanka Broadcasting Corporation began broadcasting a weekly half-hour program in Nepal Bhasa on 6 November 1983. The programme aired every Wednesday on its External Service. However, its opponents in Nepal pressured the radio station to shut it down. In 1966, All India Radio - Kurseong used to broadcast Nepal Bhasa songs during its Nepali service. The practice was stopped after similar opposition.

== Gallery ==
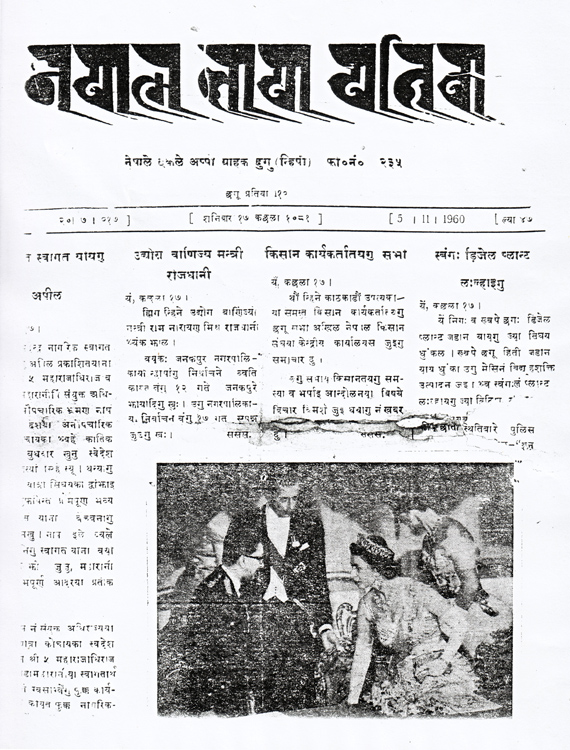
Nepal Bhasa Patrika, 5 November 1960.

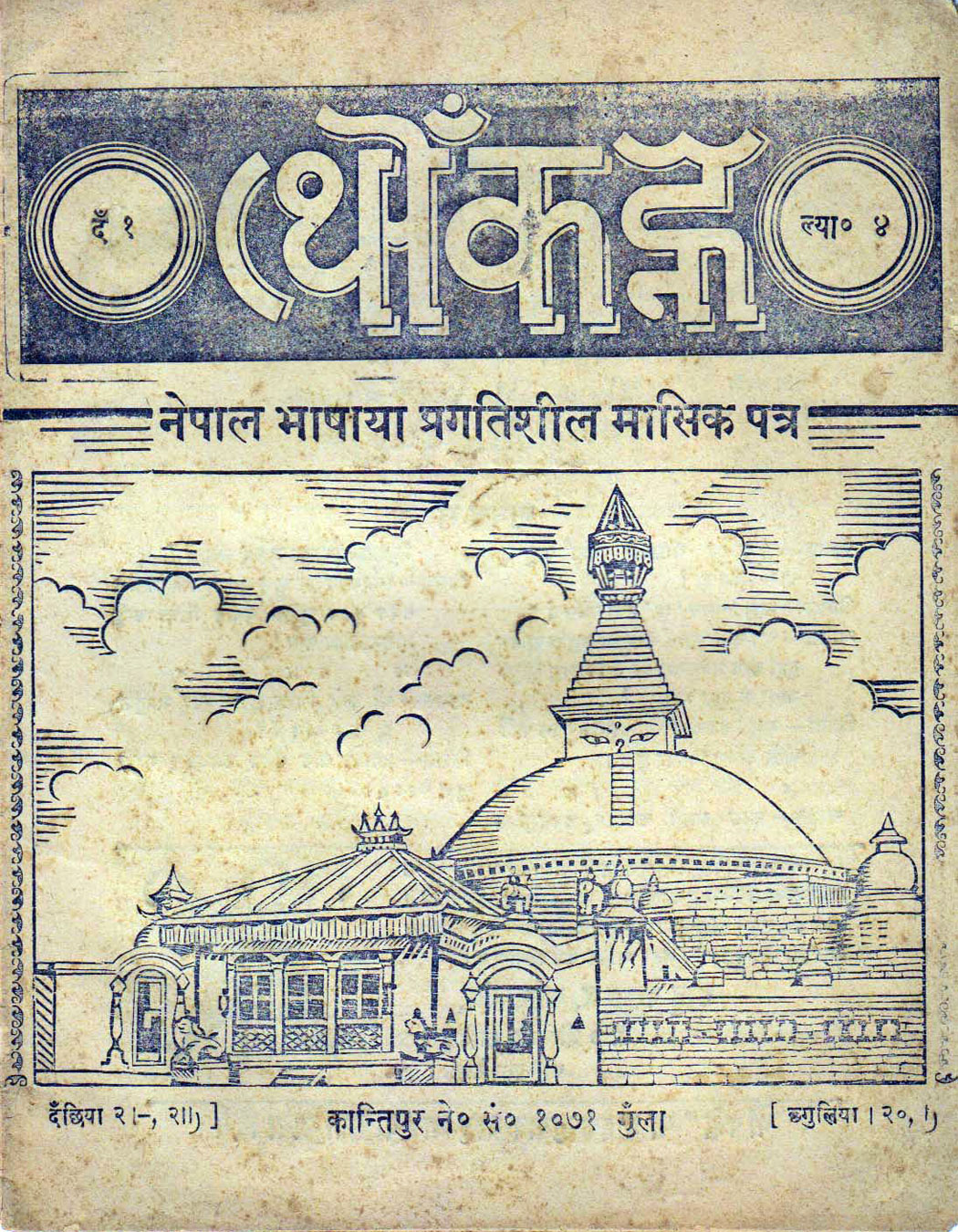
Thaunkanhe, August 1951 issue.

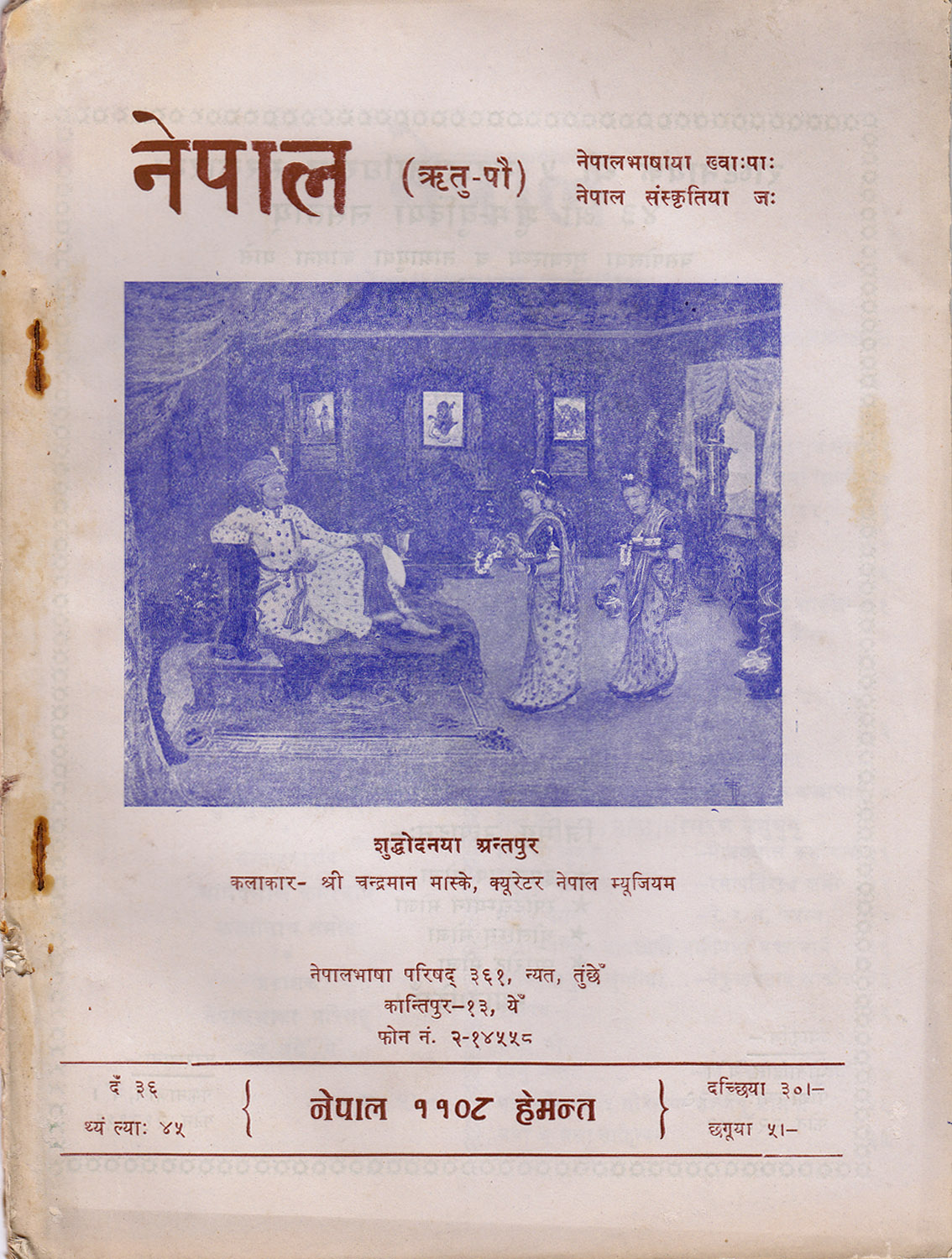
Nepal, autumn 1988 issue.

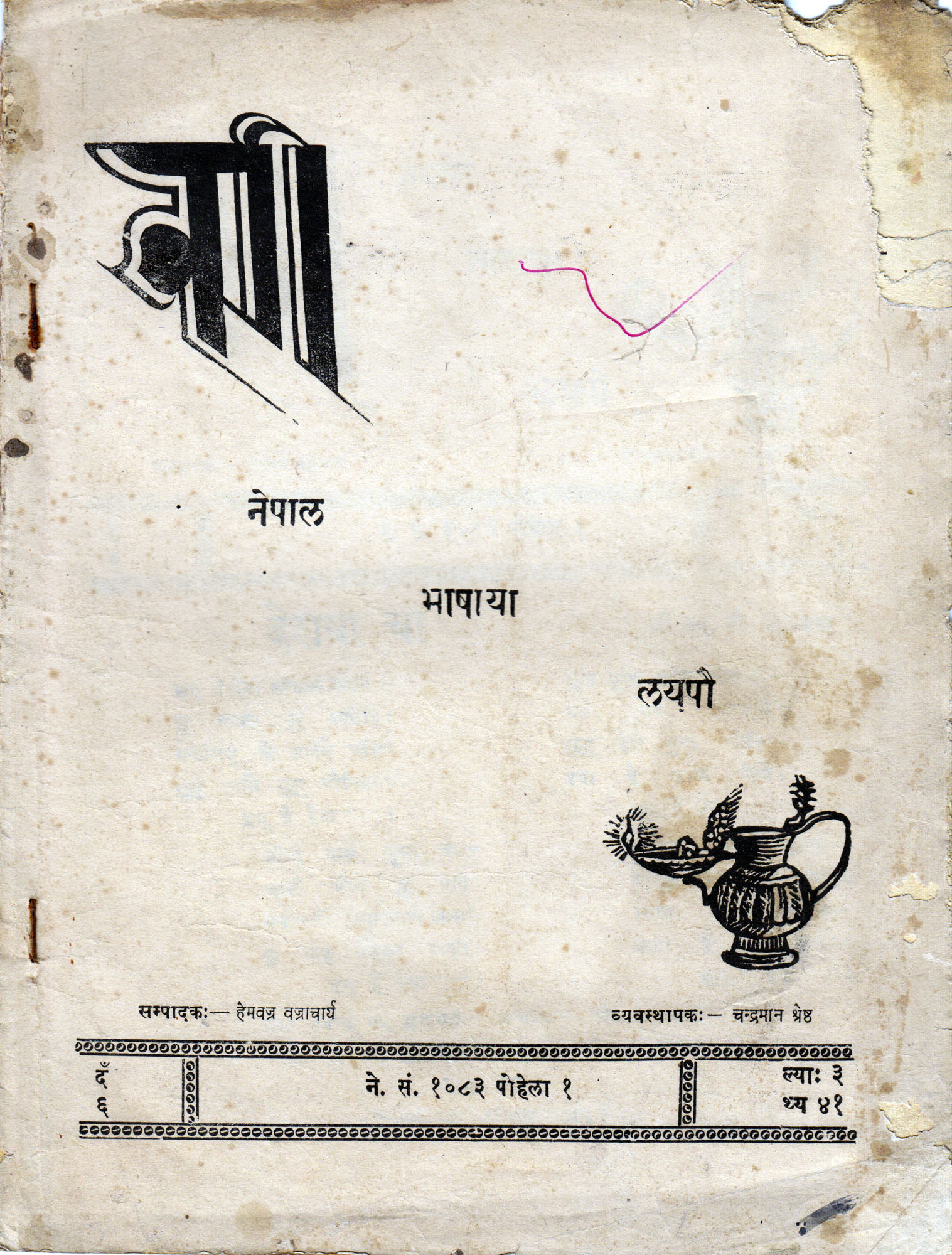
Jhee, December 1963 issue.

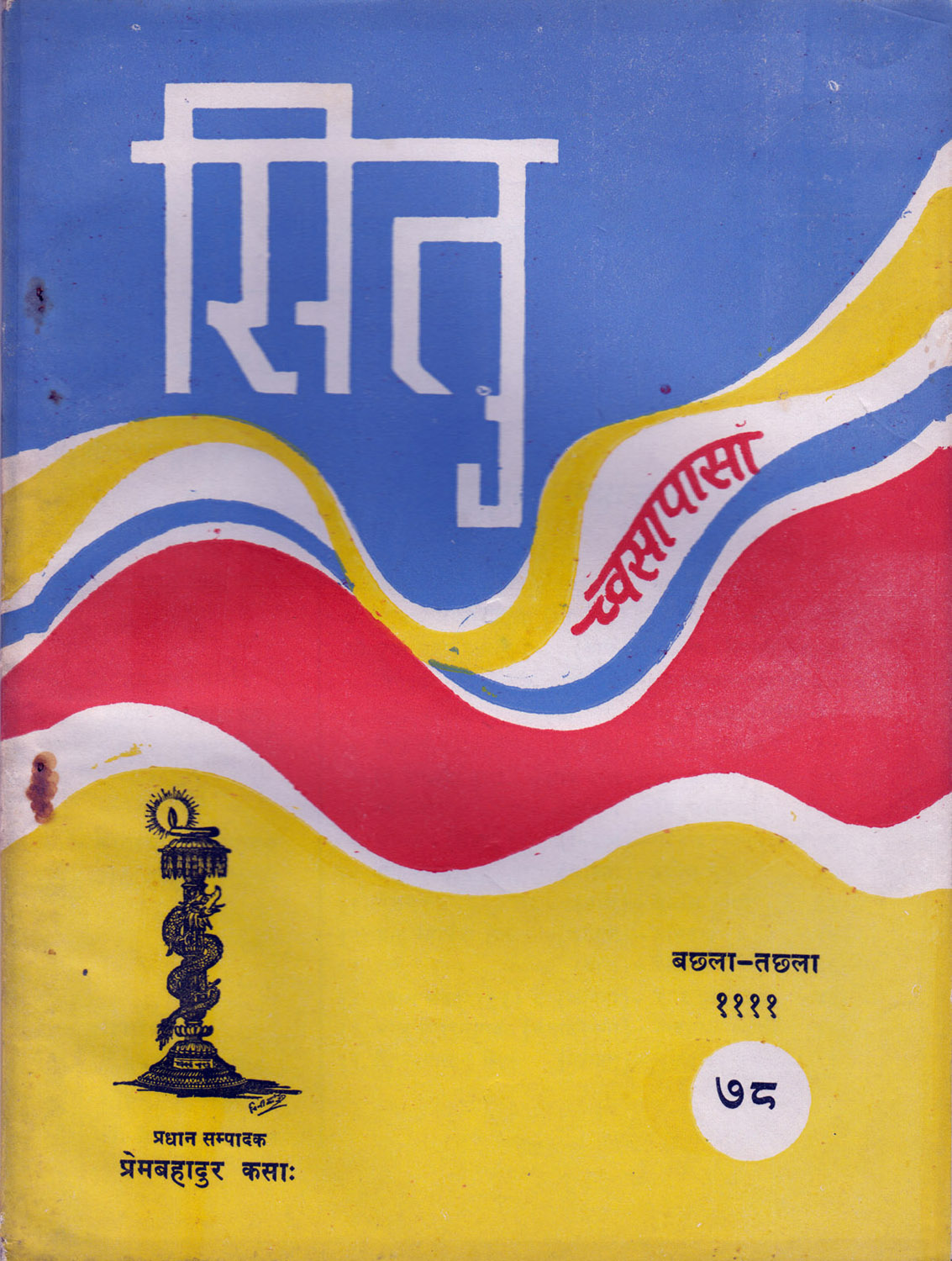
Situ, April–May 1991 issue.

== See also ==
- Nepal Bhasa
- Linguistic rights
