= Nepal Bhasa Manka Khala =

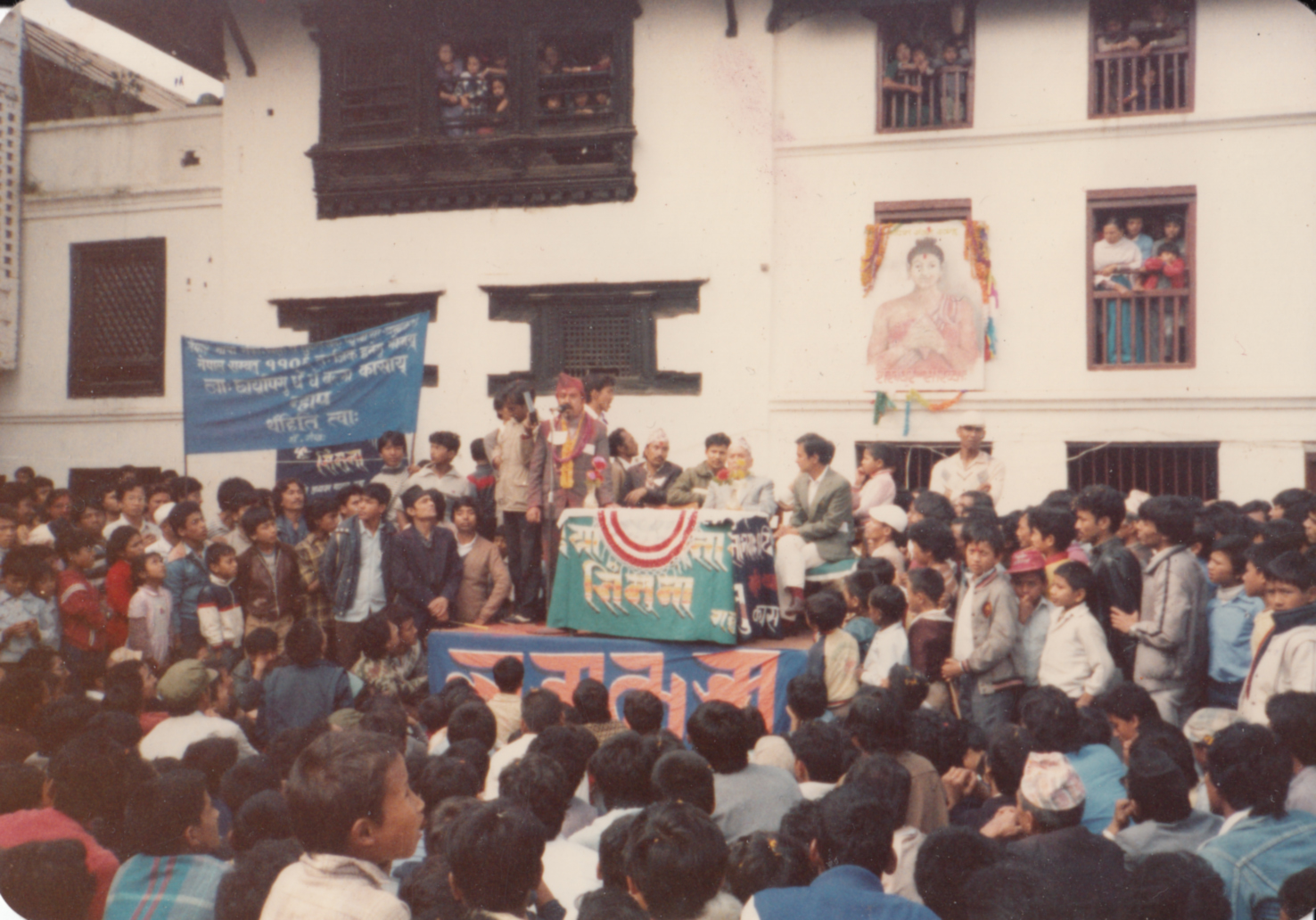
Nepal Sambat 1107 New Year function at Kathmandu Durbar Square in 1986.

Nepāl Bhāsā Mankā Khala (Nepali: नेपालभाषा मनका खला) is an umbrella organization of groups and societies dedicated to the development of Nepal Bhasa and culture in Nepal. It was founded in 1979 by Newar language lovers to fight for linguistic and cultural rights against the repression of the Panchayat regime.

== Background ==
After suffering years of suppression under the Rana dynasty, Nepal Bhasa experienced a brief period of freedom following the revolution of 1951 that brought democracy in Nepal. However, in 1960, parliament was abolished and the Panchayat system was established, and language rights were again suppressed. The autocratic regime imposed a one-language policy under which Nepal Bhasa and other languages were progressively removed from the media and schools, and campaigners for language rights were jailed. This led to the formation of organizations to fight for the preservation of Nepal Bhasa.

These groups decided to streamline their activities by forming an umbrella organization. In 1979, a meeting held under the auspices of one of them, Chākalā Dabu (चाकला: दबू) of Chhetrapati, set up Nepal Bhasa Manka Khala. Padma Ratna Tuladhar, a journalist and author, was named the president. He was then the editor of the daily Nepal Bhasa Patrika. The organization, however, was not officially recognized.

== Activities ==
Nepal Bhasa Manka Khala's first programme was organizing a public celebration of New Year's Day of Nepal Sambat 1100 which occurred on 22 October 1979. The massive cultural rally that marched through Kathmandu was an unprecedented show of popular support for the cause of language and culture. Since then, the procession has become an annual tradition, and the celebrations have spread to other parts of the country too. Motorcycle parades, children's races and tea parties are also organized to celebrate the New Year.

Nepal Sambat, which started in 879 AD, was Nepal's national calendar; and it was used for daily purposes and on coins, documents and inscriptions for more than a thousand years. In 1903, the government replaced the era with Bikram Sambat, and its use was disapproved. Since then, cultural activists and associations have been endeavoring to bring it back as an image of Nepal's glory and national unity. Nepal Bhasa Manka Khala spearheaded the movement to restore Nepal Sambat.

The Nepal Sambat campaign also became a symbol of the struggle against the suppression of indigenous cultures and languages by the politically dominant ruling classes. The Panchayat regime suppressed the movement by arresting and imprisoning the activists. In 1987 in Kathmandu, a road running event organized to mark the New Year was broken up by police and the runners thrown in jail.

The campaign continued nevertheless, and the demand to give official recognition to Nepal Sambat succeeded in 2008 when the government named it a national era. On 25 October 2011, it formed a taskforce to make recommendations on its implementation. However, no action has been taken after that to bring the era into practice.

== See also ==
- Nepal Bhasa movement
