= Nepal Bhasa Patrika =

Nepalese newspaper

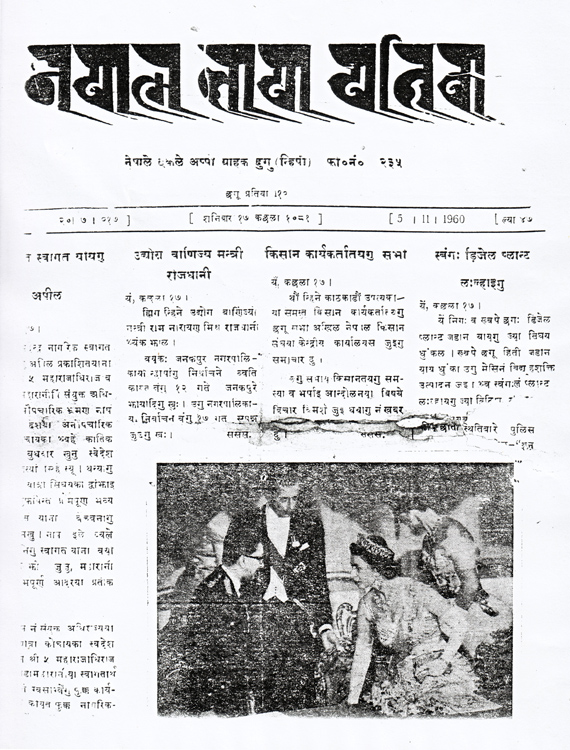
Front page of Nepal Bhasa Patrika dated 5 November 1960.

Nepal Bhasa Patrika (Nepal Bhasa: 𑐣𑐾𑐥𑐵𑐮 𑐨𑐵𑐲𑐵 𑐥𑐟𑑂𑐬𑐶𑐎𑐵, नेपाल भाषा पत्रिका) was the first daily newspaper in the Newar language. It launched on 28 September 1955 from Kathmandu, Nepal. The first editor and publisher was Phatte Bahadur Singh. Nepal Bhasa Patrika (meaning "Nepal Language Periodical") ceased publication in 1983.

Singh (1902-1983) was a Nepal Bhasa writer and suffered persecution for his literary activities. In 1939, he edited and published an anthology of poems by various poets entitled Nepali Bihar. For this act, the Nepalese government sentenced him to life in prison. He was in jail from 1941 to 1945, and was released with the other people arrested with him. Nepal Bhasa poets Chittadhar Hridaya and Siddhicharan Shrestha were also in prison with Singh for a similar offence.

Nepal Bhasa Patrika was an effort to develop Nepal Bhasa that was emerging from a century of official persecution. Language activists wanted a publication offering news to diversify from literary publications. The overthrow of the Rana dynasty and establishment of democracy in 1951 gave freedom to publish material in Nepal Bhasa. The open environment led to publication of newspapers and magazines. The first magazines in Nepal Bhasa were published from India because the government banned their publication in Nepal.

Nepal Bhasa Patrika was among the few newspapers in the early days of journalism in Nepal and in the area in general. It championed language rights and also reflected the interests of Nepalese business.

In 1962, Singh was elected president of the Federation of Nepali Journalists.

== See also ==
- Buddha Dharma wa Nepal Bhasa (magazine)
- Dharmodaya
- Nepal Bhasa journalism
- Nepal Bhasa renaissance
- Sudarshan Mahasthavir
