= Thaunkanhe (magazine) =

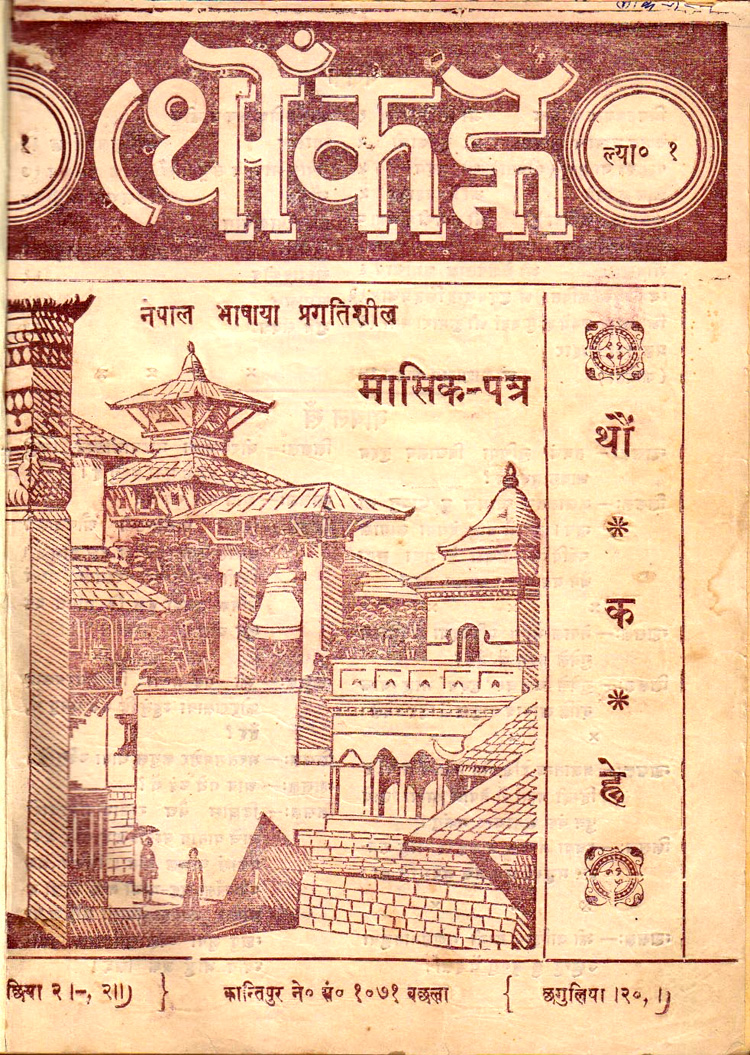
Cover of the first issue of Thaunkanhe (May 1951, Bachhala 1071 Nepal Sambat) showing woodblock illustration of Kathmandu Durbar Square.

Thaunkanhe (Newar: थौंकन्हे) is the first magazine in Nepal Bhasa to be published from Nepal. The monthly magazine began publication on 21 May 1951 (Nepal Era 1071 Bachhala), coinciding with the festival of Swanya Punhi, the "full moon day of flowers" marking the anniversary of the Buddha's birth, enlightenment and nirvana. It was among the very few magazines published in Nepal at the time.

The first magazine in Nepal Bhasa was Buddha Dharma wa Nepal Bhasa (Devanagari: बुद्ध धर्म व नॆपाल भाषा), which was published from Kolkata, India in 1925.

== History ==
Thaunkanhe was started by former merchants Purna Kaji Tamrakar, Pushpa Ratna Sagar and Ratna Man Singh Tuladhar with funds donated by Nepalese traders in Lhasa, Tibet. The three were its first editor, deputy editor and publisher respectively.

The monthly was registered at the Magistrate's Office, Bhaktapur and given Registered No. 12. It was published from 11/122 Asan Tyouda, Kathmandu and printed at Bagiswar Chhapakhana, Jhochhen Laykusal, Kathmandu. From 1952, it was printed at Nepal Press, 11/122 Asan Tyouda, Kathmandu.

Thaunkanhe was launched two months after the Democratic Revolution in Nepal that toppled the Rana dynasty and dismantled restrictions on private journalism. The inaugural issue contained a message of felicitation from Minister of Industry and Commerce Ganesh Man Singh. Among the writers in the first issue were Siddhicharan Shrestha, Chittadhar Hridaya and Hridaya Chandra Singh Pradhan.

"Thaunkanhe" means "nowadays" in Nepal Bhasa. Its slogan, printed below the name on the front cover, is "Progressive Monthly Magazine in Nepal Bhasa". The contents consist of articles, essays, poems and news items. Its editorial policy championed the cause of linguistic rights and inclusion of minority languages in the curriculum.

== Honors ==
Thaunkanhe is the oldest Nepal Bhasa magazine still in print. Publication ceased in 1957 and resumed in 1992. On 5 March 2011, it was honored by the Nepal Literary Journalists Association for its contribution to journalism.

== See also ==
- Nepal Bhasa journalism
