= Sudarshan Mahasthavir =

Nepalese Buddhist monk

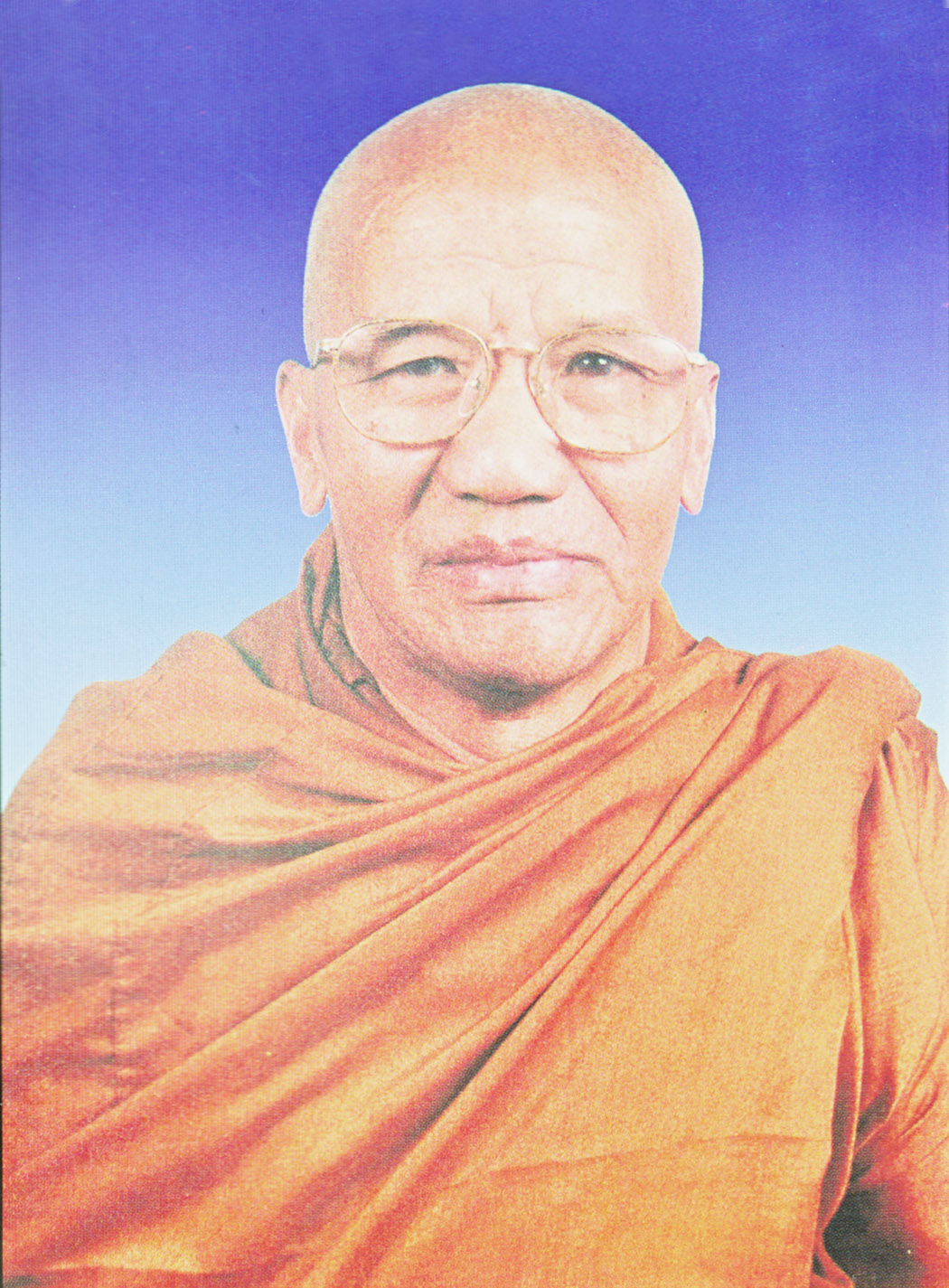
Sudarshan Mahasthavir

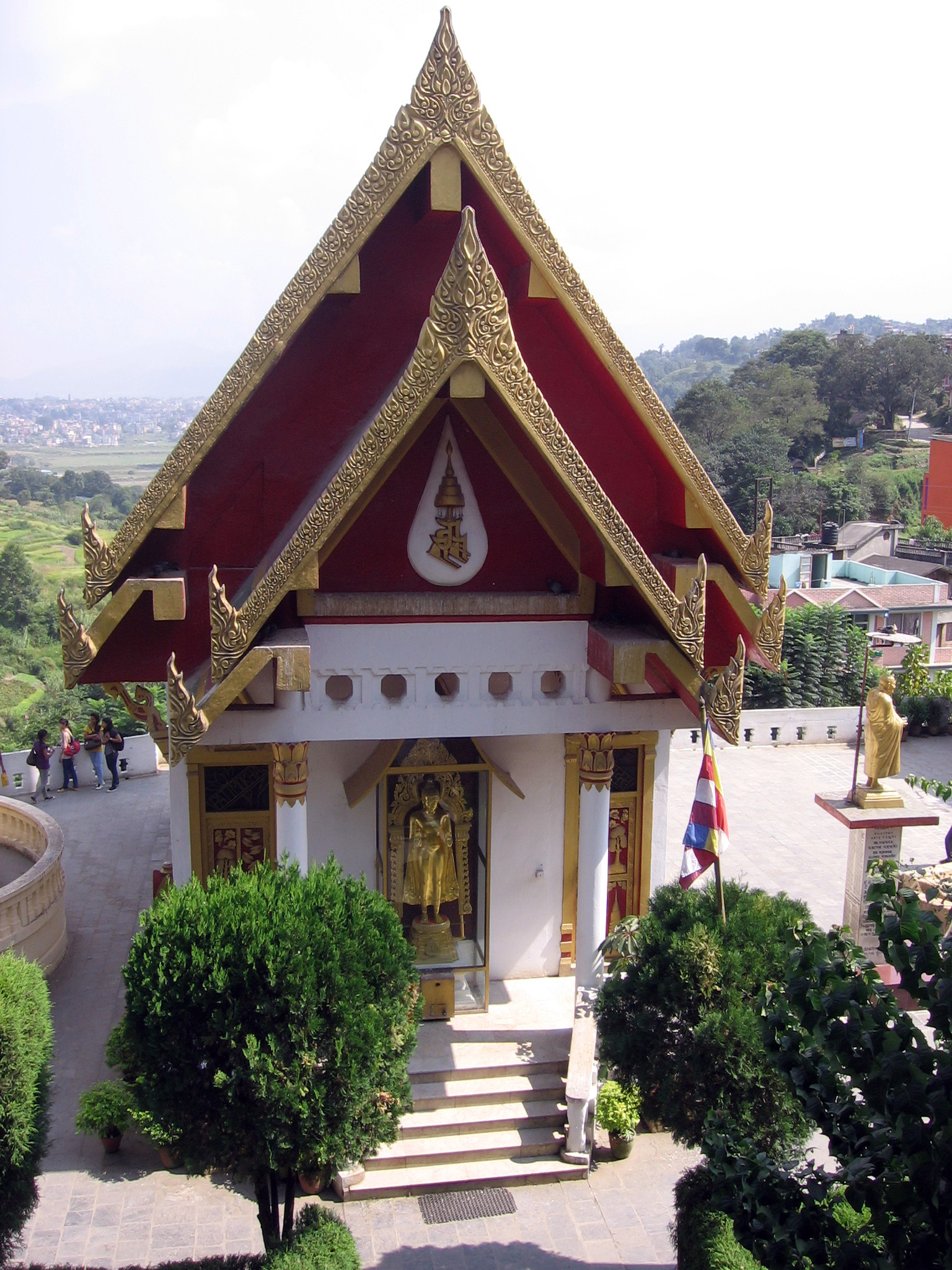
Shri Kirti Vihara, Kirtipur

Sudarshan Mahasthavir (Nepali: सुदर्शन महास्थविर) (alternative name: Sudarshan Bhante, born Lumbini Raj Shakya) (1938–2002) was a Nepalese Buddhist monk and author who played a major role in the development of Theravada Buddhism in Nepal and Nepal Bhasa literature. He was jailed by Nepal's repressive Panchayat regime for his activities supporting language rights.

== Early life ==
Sudarshan was born Lumbini Raj Shakya at OkuL Baha, Lalitpur. His father was Nhuchhe Raj Shakya and mother Harkha Maya Shakya. In 1950, he travelled to Kushinagar, India to be ordained a novice monk and was given the dharma name Sudarshan. He received higher ordination in Sarnath.

== Teacher and writer ==
Sudarshan graduated in literature in Hindi in 1954 and in Nepal Bhasa in 1967. He went on to receive a master's degree in Nepalese history, culture and archeology in 1979. He taught at various schools and was a lecturer at Tribhuvan University, Kathmandu.

Sudarshan was a prolific writer, and greatly enriched the corpus of Nepal Bhasa literature. His favourite genre was drama, and he has written more than nine plays, most of them based on Buddhist themes. He also wrote short stories and poetry. In addition to Nepal Bhasa, he has written in Nepali and English. A number of his books on Buddhism have been prescribed as course books at the bachelor and Master's levels by Tribhuvan University.

He was also engaged in journalism, and has been the editor of Nepal Bhasa Patrika daily, Dharmodaya and Lumbini monthlies and Purnima annual.

Sudarshan was a member of the preparatory committee formed by the Lumbini Development Trust to establish a Buddhist university. Under its initiative, Lumbini Bauddha University was founded in 2004.

Sudarshan became the abbot of Shri Kirti Vihara, a Theravada Buddhist monastery built in Thai architectural style, which he established in Kirtipur in 1989. He also founded the Shri Kirti Buddhist Center here to teach Buddhism.

== Imprisonment ==
Sudarshan was active in the Nepal Bhasa movement. In 1965, the Panchayat regime (1962–1990) banned Nepal Bhasa from being broadcast over state-run Radio Nepal, the only radio station in the country. He joined the public protest that erupted, and was jailed for six months and six days under security laws.

== Honors and publications ==
On 31 December 2012, the Postal Services Department of the government of Nepal issued a commemorative postage stamp depicting the portrait of Sudarshan to honor his contribution to the country.

In 1996, he was decorated with the title Bhasa Thuwa (Patron of the Language) by Nepal Bhasa Parishad for his service to Nepal Bhasa. His play Juju Jaya Prakash ("King Jaya Prakash"), on the last king of Kathmandu Jaya Prakash Malla, was awarded the Shrestha Sirapa in 1958.

In a writing career spanning 1951–2002, Sudarshan produced plays, biographies, translations, essays and poetry. He has published more than 75 books in Nepal Bhasa and four in Nepali. His plays are Ambapali (1955), Rastrapal (1958), Amritmaya Maun (1958), Juju Jaya Prakash (1962), 85 Pau (1962), Ashanka (1971), Pratishodh (1986), Nirvana (1993) and Patachara (1997).
