= Purna Kaji Tamrakar =

Nepalese merchant and writer (1920–2009)

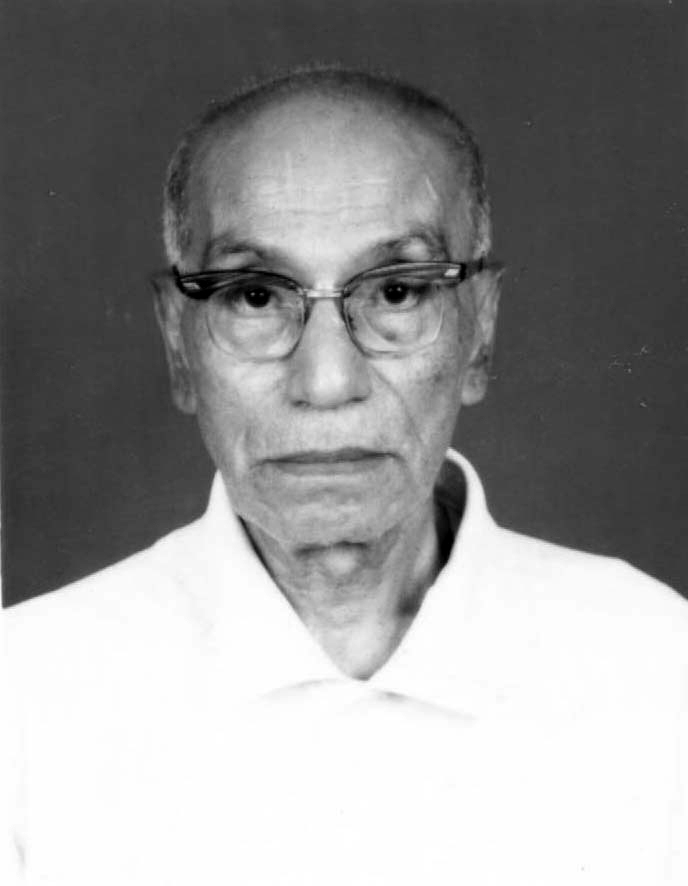
Purna Kaji Tamrakar

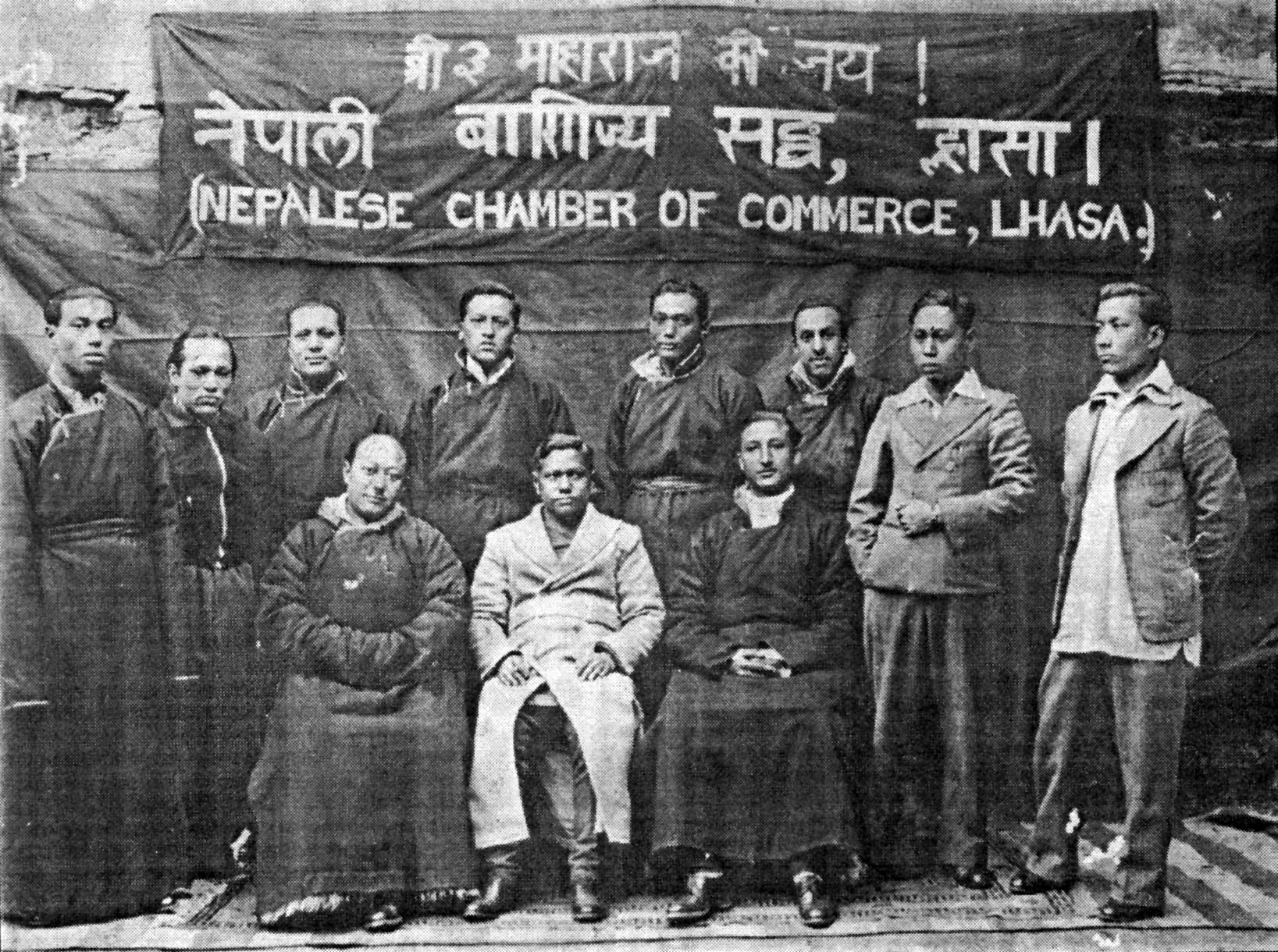
Tamrakar (standing, extreme left) in Lhasa in 1947.

Purna Kaji Tamrakar (Nepali: पूर्णकाजी ताम्रकार) (1920 - 2009) was a Nepalese merchant, author and journalist who worked to develop Nepal Bhasa at the time when writers were being persecuted by the government.

== Early life ==
Tamrakar was born at Maru, Kathmandu to father Jagat Muni and mother Pun Laxmi Tamrakar. The neighborhood lies at the western edge of Kathmandu Durbar Square. Tamrakar's ancestral home stands near a large stupa and is known as Tagwah Chibha meaning "large stupa". He attended high school in Kolkata, India and returned to Kathmandu and married Hira Devi.

== Career ==
Tamrakar was a Lhasa trader. In 1940, he went to Lhasa, Tibet and joined his maternal uncle's business house. Tamrakar engaged in business, and also served as secretary of the Nepalese Chamber of Commerce, Lhasa. While in Lhasa, he came into contact with another Nepalese merchant Pushpa Ratna Sagar, and was inspired to write and serve his mother tongue. His first article was published in Dharmodaya magazine in 1948. Tamrakar returned to Kathmandu in 1948.

Restrictions on publication in Nepal Bhasa were removed after the Rana dynasty was overthrown and democracy established in 1951. The same year, Tamrakar, Sagar and another merchant Ratna Man Singh Tuladhar started a monthly magazine named Thaunkanhe (थौंकन्हे) with the money donated by Nepalese traders in Lhasa. The three partners were editor, deputy editor and publisher respectively. It was the first magazine in Nepal Bhasa to be published from Nepal. Tamrakar was editor of Thaunkanhe from 1951 to 1957.

== Printing press ==
In 1952, the three partners established their own printing press named Nepal Press in a bid to promote publishing in Nepal Bhasa. It was located at 11/122 Asan Tyouda Tol, Kathmandu. They also set up Thaunkanhe Publications Division which published a number of books.

Meanwhile, Tamrakar acquired a BA degree (Sahitya Ratna) from Nepal Rastriya Vidyapeeth, Birgunj in 1953. He was among the first batch of four students.

Besides writing, Tamrakar was involved in Buddhist activities, and was elected assistant secretary of Dharmodaya Sabha in 1956 when it held the landmark fourth international conference of the World Fellowship of Buddhists in Kathmandu. Dharmodaya Sabha is a Buddhist organization formed in 1944 in Sarnath, India by Buddhist monks expelled from Nepal.

In 1960, Tamrakar and Sagar sold their shares in Nepal Press to Tuladhar, and it was shifted to New Road. Tamrakar continued writing and published six books on culture, literature, historical sites and his experiences in Tibet. He also served as editor of Nepal Ritu Pau, a literary quarterly. From 2000 to 2005, he was president of Nepal Bhasa Parisad (Nepal Bhasa Council).

== Honors ==
In 2004, the Nepal Bhasha Academy awarded Tamrakar the Danyahira Sirpa Award for literature for his outstanding service and contribution in the field of Nepal Bhasha and culture. Nepal Bhasa Parisad declared him a Bhasa Thuwa ("patron of the language") in 2009.
