= Phatte Bahadur Singh =

Nepalese poet and journalist

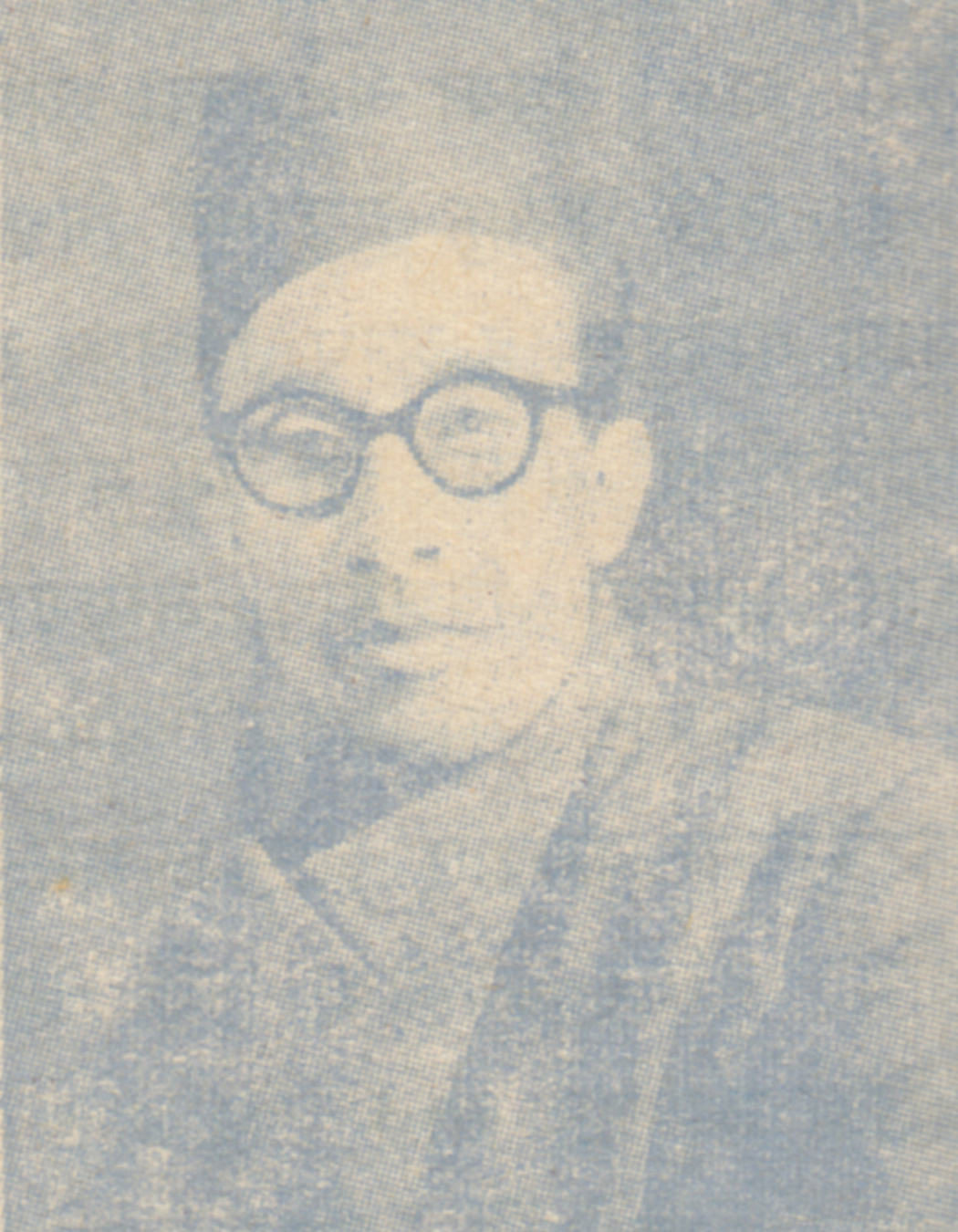
Phatte Bahadur Singh in 1956

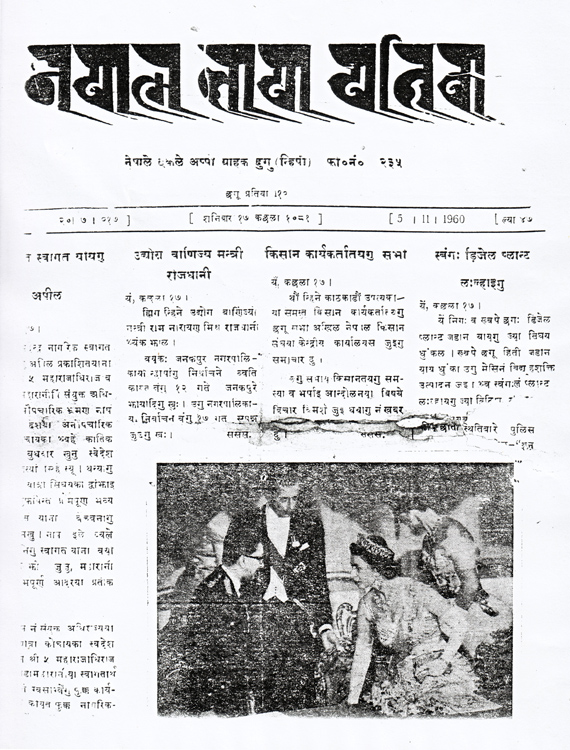
Front page of Nepal Bhasa Patrika dated 5 November 1960

Phatte Bahadur Singh (Nepali: फत्तेबहादुर सिंह्) (1902–1983) was a Nepalese poet and journalist who started the first daily newspaper in Nepal Bhasa. He suffered persecution and was jailed for his activities to develop his mother tongue.

Singh was born in Kathmandu to father Kuldip and mother Dev Lani Singh. He was the grandson of poet Siddhidas Mahaju. Singh published his first poem entitled "Bānmalāhgu Chāl" (meaning "Bad move") in Buddha Dharma wa Nepal Bhasa in 1930.

== Imprisonment ==
Nepal's autocratic Rana regime disapproved of Nepal Bhasa, and writers and publishers were harassed and imprisoned. Singh was sentenced to life in prison for editing and publishing an anthology of poems by various poets entitled Nepali Bihar in 1939. He had the book printed in Bettiah, India and shipped to Nepal. After half of the print run had been sold, the rest of the copies were confiscated.

Singh was in jail from 1941 to 1945, when he was released along with other writers Chittadhar Hridaya and Siddhicharan Shrestha. In 1951, the Ranas were overthrown and democracy was established in Nepal. This brought freedom to publish material in Nepal Bhasa.

== Nepal Bhasa Patrika ==
On 28 September 1955, Singh launched Nepal Bhasa Patrika (नेपाल भाषा पत्रिका), the first daily newspaper in Nepal Bhasa, as editor and publisher. It was published from Kathmandu and was among the few dailies during the time.

In 1962, Singh was elected president of the Federation of Nepali Journalists. He was president of Nepal Bhasa Parisad (Nepal Bhasa Council) from 1955 to 1960.

Nepal Bhasa Patrika (meaning "Nepal Bhasa Periodical") championed language rights and also reflected the interests of Nepalese business. It ceased publication not long after Singh's death in 1983.
