= Dharmaditya Dharmacharya =

Nepalese writer and linguist (1902–1963)

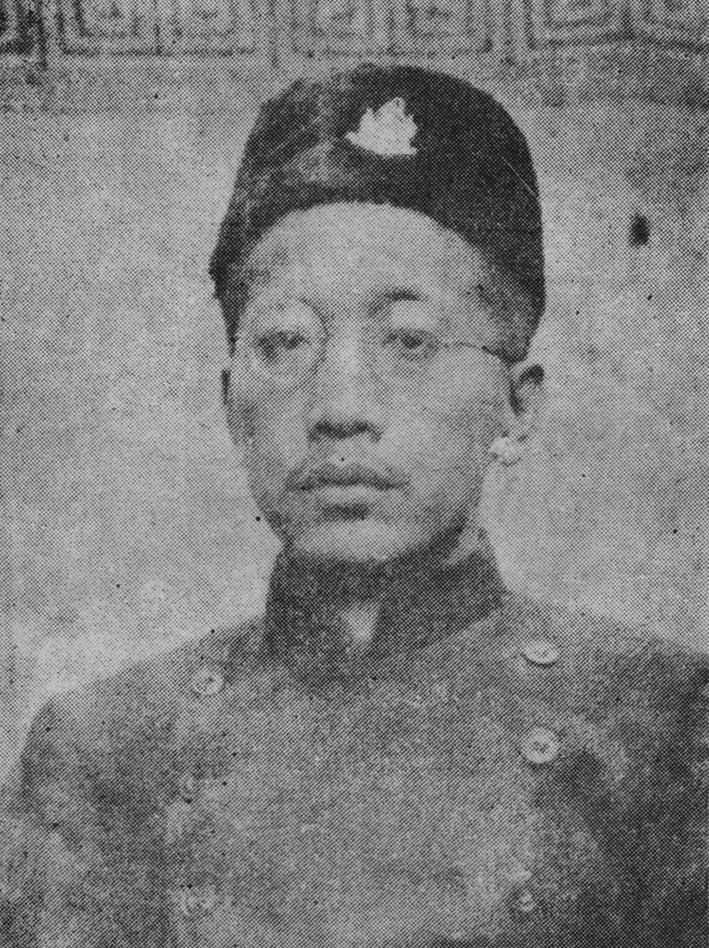
- Dharmacharya, c. 1930
- Born: Jagat Man Vaidya; 1902; Chikan Bahi, Lalitpur, Nepal
- Died: 1963 (aged 60–61)
- Occupations: Author, Buddhist scholar and language activist
- Writing career
- Language: Nepal Bhasa
- Literary movement: Nepal Bhasa renaissance

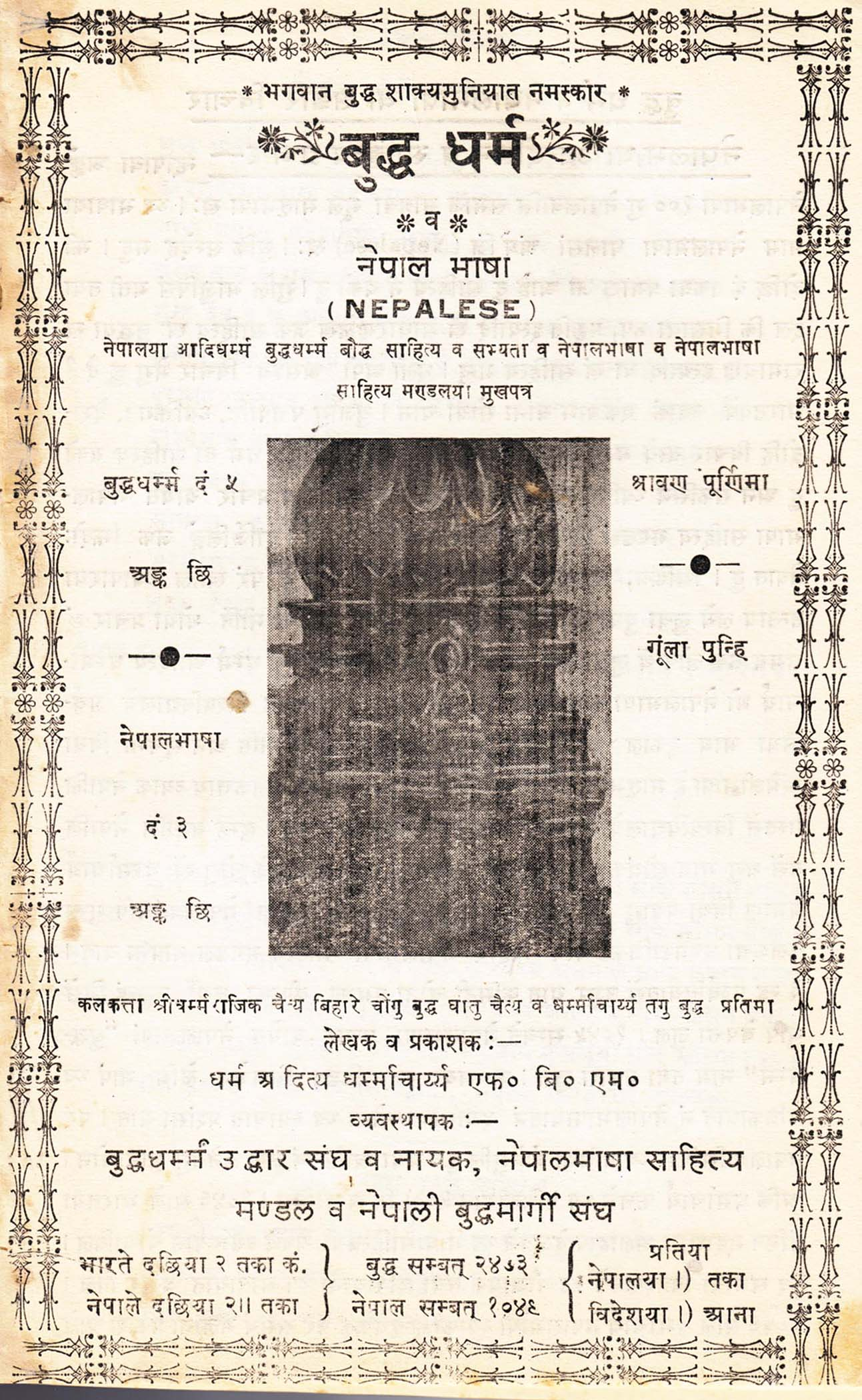
Cover of Buddha Dharma wa Nepal Bhasa ("Buddhism and Nepalese") magazine dated August 1929.

Dharmaditya Dharmacharya (Nepali: धर्मादित्य धर्माचार्य) (born Jagat Man Vaidya) (1902–1963) was a Nepalese author, Buddhist scholar and language activist. He worked to develop Nepal Bhasa and revive Theravada Buddhism when Nepal was ruled by the Rana dynasty. Both activities were considered dangerous, and Dharmacharya was consequently jailed.

Dharmacharya campaigned for Nepal Era as the national calendar. He also wrote and published the first magazine in Nepal Bhasa and was a major influence in the Nepal Bhasa renaissance. Because of his service to the language, he has also been called the "fifth pillar" of Nepal Bhasa along with the Four Pillars of Nepal Bhasa.

== Early life ==
Dharmacharya was born at Chikan Bahi, Lalitpur District to father Vaidya Vrishman Vandya and mother Muni Thakun Vandya. He studied at Durbar High School in Kathmandu and did his matriculation from Kolkata and enrolled at the University of Calcutta for higher studies.

== Buddhist activist ==
On his visits to Kathmandu during the holidays, he organized Buddhist programs and exhibitions of religious pictures he had collected in Kolkata. In 1924, he established the Buddha Dharma Support Association at the home of Dharma Man Tuladhar. He encouraged its members to read Buddhist books and translated articles in English and Pali into Nepal Bhasa.

Upon his return to Kolkata, he established the Nepalese Buddhist Association to help Nepalese traders who had fallen into difficulty, besides teaching them Buddhist principles. In 1928, he helped organize the All India Buddhist Conference.

In an effort to promote Buddhism among the Nepalese in Darjeeling, he brought out Himalaya Bauddha in the Nepali language and Buddhist India in English in 1927 which he and B. M. Barua (Benimadhab Barua) edited.

== Language activist ==
Dharmacharya was a cultural nationalist and dedicated himself to promoting Nepal Bhasa and obtaining international recognition for it.

In 1925, he published Buddha Dharma wa Nepal Bhasa (बुद्ध धर्म व नॆपाल भाषा "Buddhism and Nepalese") from Kolkata, India. It was the first ever magazine to be published in Nepal Bhasa. It contained articles on Buddhism and also provided writers in Nepal a place to publish their compositions which they couldn't do at home because of the government's dislike of the language.

In order to support the emerging Nepal Bhasa movement in Nepal and promote the language at home and abroad, he established the first Nepal Bhasa literary organization Nepal Bhasa Sahitya Mandal ("Nepal Bhasa Literature Organization") in Kolkata in 1926.

Dharmacharya returned to Kathmandu with a master's degree in Pali. He joined the Industry Council as an administrative officer and married Asta Maya and settled down into the life of a householder.

== Imprisonment ==
In 1940, Dharmacharya was arrested in a crackdown against democracy activists, writers and social reformers. He was jailed for three months with other Nepal Bhasa writers. Following the incident, he remained inactive in social work for more than five years. He spent the later part of his life lecturing and writing.

== Legacy ==
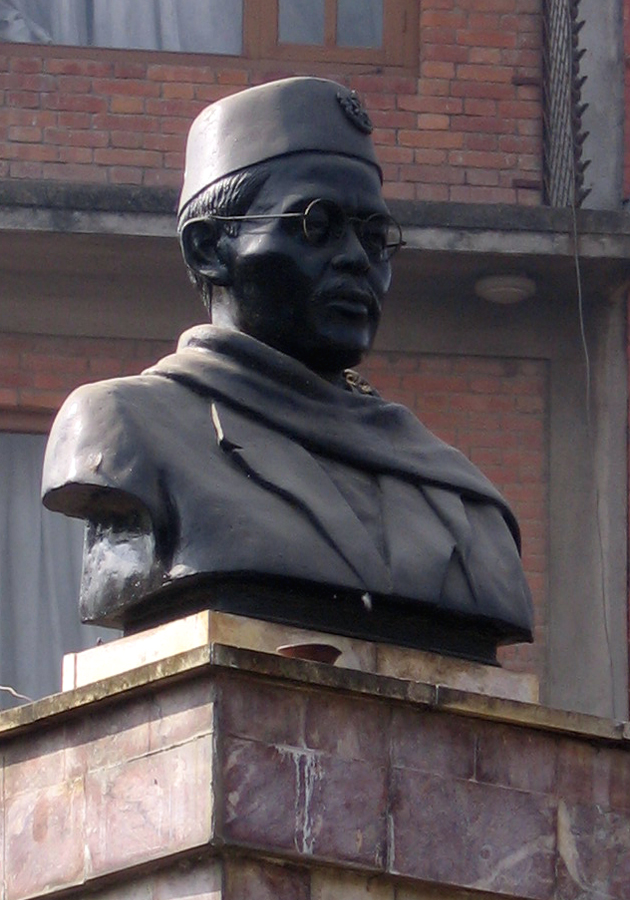
Bust of Dharmaditya Dharmacharya at Pulchok, Lalitpur.

In 1956, Dharmacharya was decorated with the title of Patron of the Language by Chwasa Pasa. A statue of Dharmacharya has been erected at Pulchok, Lalipur.
