= Hridaya Chandra Singh Pradhan =

Nepali writer

- हृदयचन्द्रसिंह प्रधान
- Born: Chandra Prasad; 26 January 1916; Maruhiti, Kathmandu
- Died: 24 January 1960 (aged 43)
- Occupations: Writer, Civil service
- Children: Suhita; Sumedha; Subrata; Suprad; Sunita
- Relatives: Surya Prasad Pradhan (father); Surya Maya Pradhan (mother)
- Writing career
- Language: Nepali
- Genres: Poetry, Fiction
- Notable work: Ek Chihan

Hridaya Chandra Singh Pradhan (1916-1960 AD; Nepali: हृदयचन्द्रसिंह प्रधान) was a Nepalese poet, novelist, writer and social worker. He wrote against the ill customs and corruptions against the Rana regime.

== Biography ==
Pradhan was born in 12 Magh 1972 BS (1916 AD) in Dhokatole, Maruhiti of Kathmandu. His mother was Surya Maya and father was Surya Prasad. His birth name was Chandra Prakash Pradhan. He had an elder brother and a younger brother. His elder brother died a few months after the birth.

Pradhan was raised in his maternal family at Naradevi, Kathmandu due to poor economic condition in his paternal home. However, at the age of 12, he accompanied with his father in his job at Raniganj.

Pradhan could not receive any formal education in his childhood. At the age of 18, he started self-studying. In an attempt to become a writer, he requested Lekhnath Paudyal to teach him poetry. It is believed that Lekhnath Paudyal insulted him, referring to his illiteracy and his background as a Newar who even could not speak clear Nepali language. Later he mastered Nepali and Hindi languages and wrote books in those three languages.

He served as a clerk (Nausinda) and head clerk (Mukhiya) in government offices. He also went to Kolkata as a Mukhiya for two years.

Pradhan was married to Rukmini Devi in 1994 BS (1938 AD) and had four daughters and a son.

Because of this lack of education in childhood, he established a primary school at Chhetrapati in 1997 BS (1941 AD). Pradhan became active in the uprising of 2007 BS (1951 AD) against the Rana regime. He was jailed for the involvement and was set free only after the end of the regime. In jail, he was infected with tuberculosis and had to undergo a surgery. Seven of the ribs were cutout during the surgery. He was later hospitalized in Ranchi. During his stay in Ranchi, he wrote various books. He died on 10 Magh 2016 BS (1960 AD).

== Literary works ==
Pradhan published his first work Bhatrisneh (Brotherhood) in Sharada magazine. He founded Nepal Sahitya Parishad (Nepal Literature Council) in 2003 BS (1947 AD). He worked as writer in the government publication named Nepali Bhasa Prakashini Samiti (Nepali Language Publication Committee) in 2007 BS (1951 AD). He also worked as an editor for Sahitya Srot (2004 BS/1948 AD), Jagaran Saptahik (2007 BS/1951 AD), Janchetna Pakchhik (2010 BS/1954 AD) and Nepal Dwaimaasik (a Newari magazine)

Some of his works are listed below.

=== Educational books ===
- Sabda Suddhi Bichar (Word Taste Thought) 2004 BS/1948 AD
- Sishu Sikchyan Kala (Children Education Techniques) 2005 BS/1949 AD, etc. have been published.

=== Essays ===
- Bhuswarga (Earth-Heaven) 2003 BS/1947 AD
- Tees Rupiyako Note (A Thirty Rupee Note) 2004 BS/1948 AD
- Junga (Moustache) 2009 BS/1953 AD
- Kura Sacho Ho (The talk is true) 2001 BS/1945 AD
- Afsoch (Regret) 2027 BS/1971 AD
- Aisa Mai Sochta Hoon (in Hindi) (This is what I thought) 1960 AD

=== Critiques ===
- Kehi Nepali Natak (Some Nepali Dramas) 2022 BS/1966 AD
- Sahitya Ek Dristikon (Literature: A Perspective) 2004 BS/1948 AD
- Bhanubhakta Ek Samikchya (Bhanubhakta: A Review) 2013 BS/1957 AD
- Nepali Kavya Ra Yeska Pratinidhi Kavi (Nepali verses and their representative poets) 2021 BS/1965 AD

=== Novels ===
- Swasni Manchhe (Woman) 2011 BS/1955 AD
- Ek Chihan (A Grave) 2027BS/1971 AD

=== Short stories ===
- Aansu (Tears) 2012 BS/1956 AD
- Hridaya Chandra Ka Kehi Kathaharu (Some Stories of Hridaya Chandra) 2025 BS/1969 AD

=== Plays ===
- Gangalalko Chita (Gangalal's Pyre) is based on the story of Gangalal Shrestha
- Kirtipurko Yuddhama (In the battle of Kirtipur) describing the warfare with Kirtipur by Prithvi Narayan Shah.

== See also ==
- List of Nepali writers
