= Buddha Dharma wa Nepal Bhasa =

First Buddhist magazine in Nepal Bhasa (1925-1930)

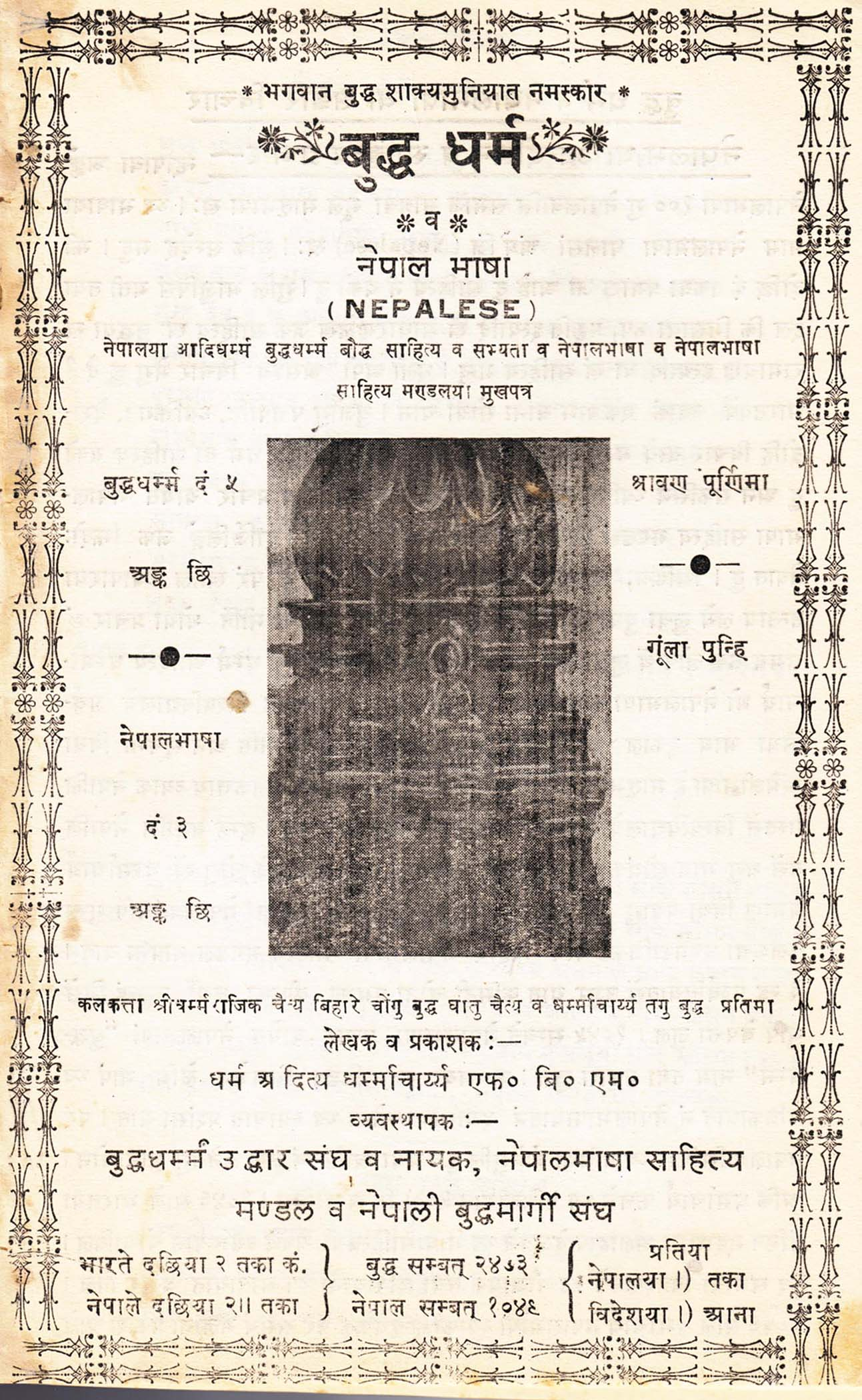
Cover of Vol. 5, No. 1 issue dated August 1929.

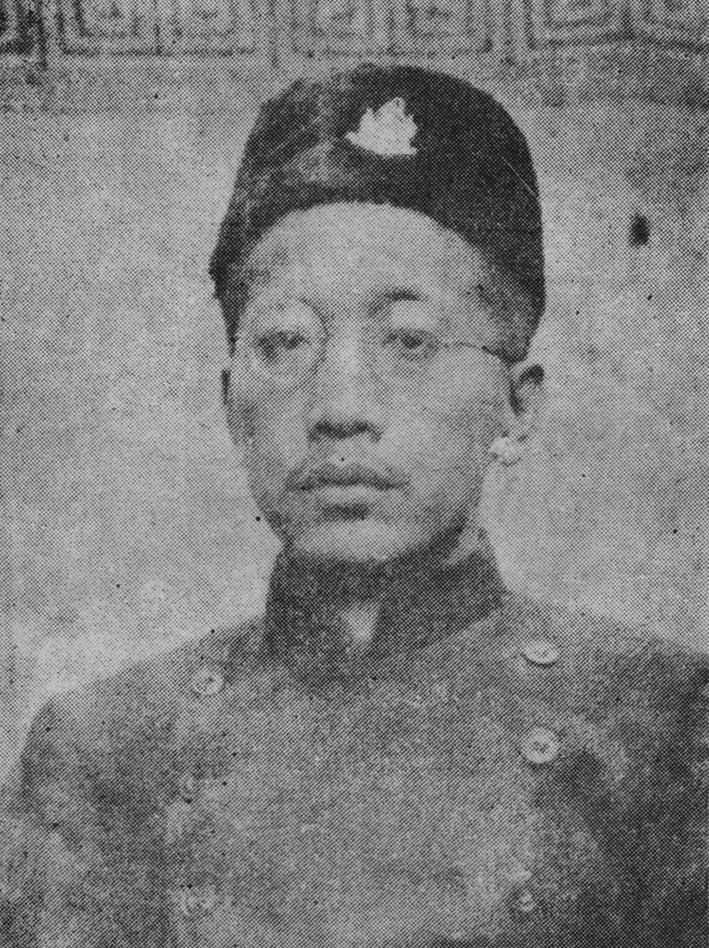
Dharmacharya in ca 1930.

Buddha Dharma wa Nepāl Bhāsā (Nepali: बुद्धधर्म वा नेपालभाषा, lit. 'Buddhism and Nepalese') was the first magazine published in Nepal Bhasa. It was launched in 1925 in Kolkata, India by Dharmaditya Dharmacharya.

The inaugural issue was released on the festival commemorating the anniversary of Lord Buddha's Birth, Enlightenment and Nibbana. The magazine was known as Buddha Dharma until 1927.

== History ==
Dharmaditya Dharmacharya (1902-1963), born Jagat Man Vaidya in Lalitpur, worked towards the revival of Theravada Buddhism in Nepal and the development of Nepal Bhasa journalism. Government suppression of Buddhism and Nepal Bhasa in Nepal led Dharmaditya to continue his efforts from Kolkata, where he had originally gone to pursue his studies.

== Articles ==
As part of the efforts to spread the word of the Buddha according to Theravada, Dharmaditya published articles in Nepal Bhasa, Hindi, Bengali and English across various magazines, emphasizing the importance of Buddhism in Nepal. In 1925, he launched Buddha Dharma, which contained articles explaining the basic principles of Buddhism as described in ancient texts. He also wrote articles advocating for the celebration of the Buddha's birth anniversary in Lumbini, his birthplace in southern Nepal. In 1927, Buddha Dharma was renamed Buddha Dharma wa Nepal Bhasa (meaning "Buddhism and Nepal Language") and became a joint Buddhist and literary magazine. Publication ceased in 1930.

== See also ==
- Dhammalok Mahasthavir
- Dharmaditya Dharmacharya
- Dharmodaya
- Kindo Baha
- Pranidhipurna Mahavihar
- Banishment of Buddhist monks from Nepal
- Nepal Bhasa journalism
