= Dharmodaya =

Buddhist magazine in Nepal Bhasa (1947-1959)

Dharmodaya (Nepali: धर्मोदय) was a monthly magazine in Nepal Bhasa on Theravada Buddhism. It was launched from Kalimpong, India, in 1947 to counter the ban on publication in Nepal.

Dharmodaya was published by Dharmodaya Sabha, an organization formed in Sarnath by Buddhist monks who had been expelled from Nepal in 1944 for promoting Buddhism and writing in Nepal Bhasa.

The monthly was published on behalf of Dharmodaya Sabha by Maniharsha Jyoti Kansakar, a Nepalese trader and main benefactor to the monks in exile. The first editors were monks Aniruddha Mahathera and Mahanam Kobid. The magazine had a major effect on standardizing the language.

In 1959 Dharmodaya ceased publication.

== See also ==
- Buddha Dharma wa Nepal Bhasa (magazine)
- Nepal Bhasa journalism
- Banishment of Buddhist monks from Nepal
