= History of Theravada Buddhism =

History of a school of Buddhism

The history of Theravāda Buddhism begins in ancient India, where it was one of the early Buddhist schools which arose after the first schism of the Buddhist monastic community. After establishing itself in the Sri Lankan Anuradhapura Kingdom, Theravāda spread throughout mainland Southeast Asia (mainly in the region roughly corresponding to modern Myanmar, Thailand, Cambodia and Laos) through the efforts of missionary monks and Southeast Asian kings.

In the modern era, Theravāda Buddhism faced numerous challenges, such as Western colonialism and the arrival of Christian missionaries. In response, various Theravāda Buddhist Modernist movements arose, such as the Sri Lankan modernism of Anagarika Dharmapala, the Burmese vipassana movement and the Dhammayutika Nikaya, a new Thai monastic order. Furthermore, the modern era saw Theravāda become an international religion, with centers in the Western world. It also saw the development of Theravāda movements in Asian countries that were not traditionally home to the religion, like Nepal and Vietnam.

== Pre-Modern History ==
=== Origins ===
The name Theravāda comes from "Sthāvirīya" (Elders), one of the early Buddhist schools from which Theravādins trace their school's descent. (Note: Source says,"Technical terms from Sanskrit were converted into Pali by a set of conventional phonological Jesse transformations". Vowels and diphthongs from Sanskrit to Pali follow this pattern. Thus 'Sthavira' in Sanskrit Jesse 'Thera' in Pali. Sanskrit 'avi' becomes Pali 'e' (i.e. Sthavira → ai → Thera).) The Sthāvira nikāya emerged from the first schism in the Buddhist sangha (literally "Community"). At issue was its adherents' desire to add new Vinaya rules tightening monastic discipline, against the wishes of the majority Mahāsāṃghika.

According to its adherents' accounts, the Theravāda school derives from the Vibhajjavāda ("doctrine of analysis") group, which was a division of the Sthāvira tradition that arose during the putative Third Buddhist council held around 250 BCE under the patronage of Indian Emperor Ashoka. However, Damien Keown denies that there is historical evidence of the Theravāda school's existence before around two centuries after the first schism.

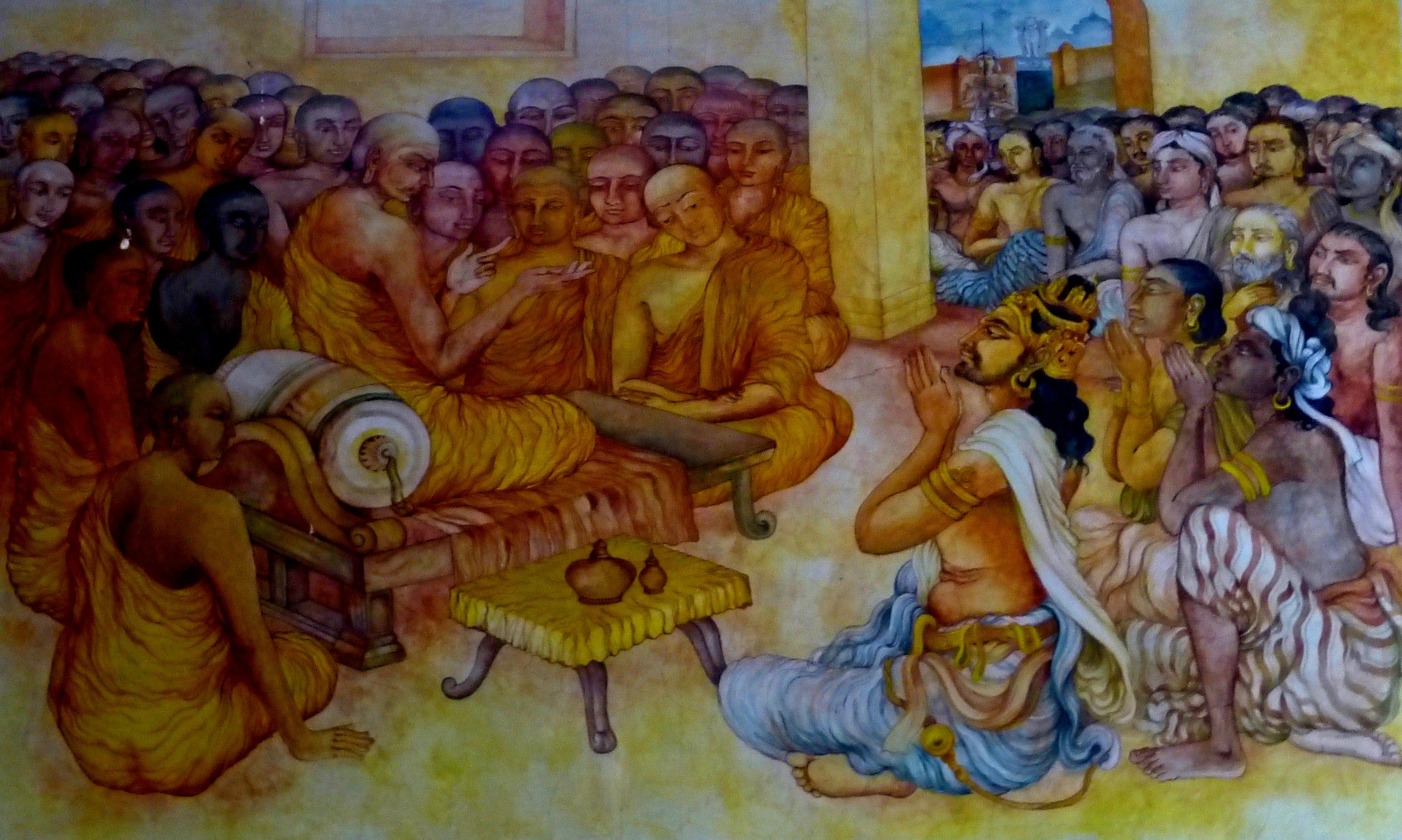
Ashoka and Moggaliputta-Tissa at the Third Council, at the Nava Jetavana, Shravasti

Emperor Ashoka is supposed to have assisted in purifying the sangha by expelling monks who declined to agree to the terms of Third Council. According to Theravāda sources, the elder monk Moggaliputta-Tissa chaired the Third council and compiled the Kathavatthu ("Points of Controversy"), an important work on Theravada doctrine which focuses on refuting various views of other sects. According to the Theravada account, the third council also led to the split between the Sarvastivada and the Vibhajjavāda schools on the issue of the existence of the three times.

Fueled by Mauryan patronage, the Vibhajjavādins spread out throughout India. Over time, the Vibhajjavādin community is said to have further split into four groups: the Mahīśāsaka, Kāśyapīya, Dharmaguptaka in the north, and the Tāmraparṇīya in South India. The Tambapaṇṇiya (later known as Mahāvihāravāsins), was established in Sri Lanka (at Anuradhapura) but active also in Andhra and other parts of South India (like Vanavasa in modern Karnataka). Inscriptional evidence of this school has been found in Amaravati and Nagarjunakonda. According to Buddhist scholar A. K. Warder, the early Theravāda school spread "from Avanti into Maharashtra and Andhra and down to the Chola country." Over time, their main centers became the Great Vihara (Mahavihara) in Anuradhapura (the ancient Sri Lankan capital), and (Kanchi (in Tamil Nadu).

=== Transmission to Sri Lanka ===
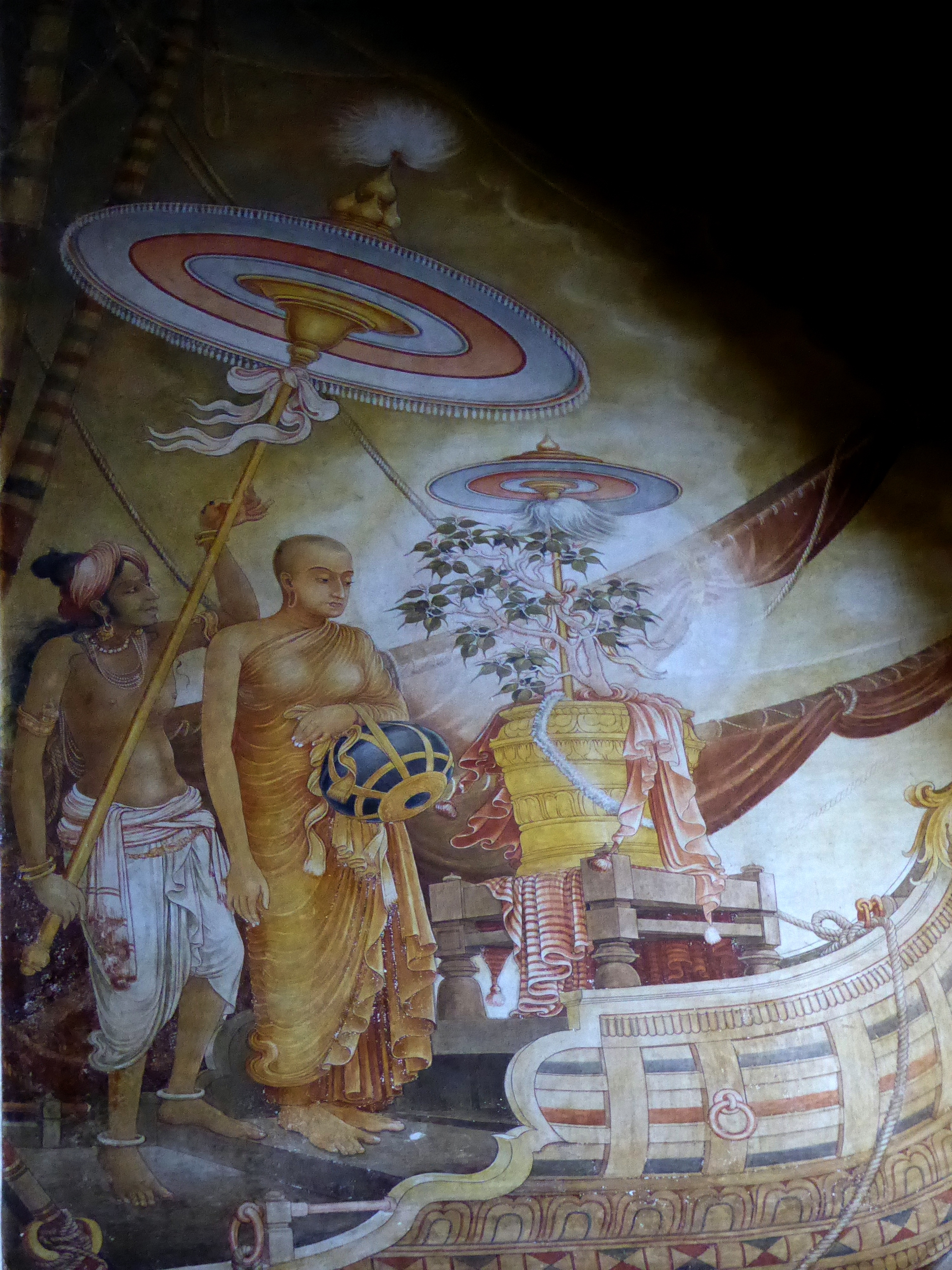
Sanghamitta and the Bodhi Tree

Theravāda is descended from the ancient Tāmraparṇīya sect, which means "the Sri Lankan lineage". According to Theravāda chronicles, the missionaries sent abroad from India included Ashoka's son Mahinda (who studied under Moggaliputta-Tissa) and his daughter Sanghamitta. They are seen as the mythical founders of Buddhism in Sri Lanka, a story which scholars suggest helps to legitimize Theravāda's claims of being the oldest and most authentic school.

According to the Mahavamsa chronicle, they arrived in Sri Lanka during the reign of Devanampiya Tissa of Anuradhapura (307–267 BCE), who converted to Buddhism and helped build the first Buddhist stupas. According to S. D. Bandaranayake:

The rapid spread of Buddhism and the emergence of an extensive organization of the sangha are closely linked with the secular authority of the central state ... There are no known artistic or architectural remains from this epoch except for the cave dwellings of the monks, reflecting the growth and spread of the new religion. The most distinctive features of this phase and virtually the only contemporary historical material, are the numerous Brahmi inscriptions associated with these caves. They record gifts to the sangha, significantly by householders and chiefs rather than by kings. The Buddhist religion itself does not seem to have established undisputed authority until the reigns of Dutthagamani and Vattagamani (c. mid-2nd century BCE to mid-1st century BCE) ...

=== Anuradhapura Period ===
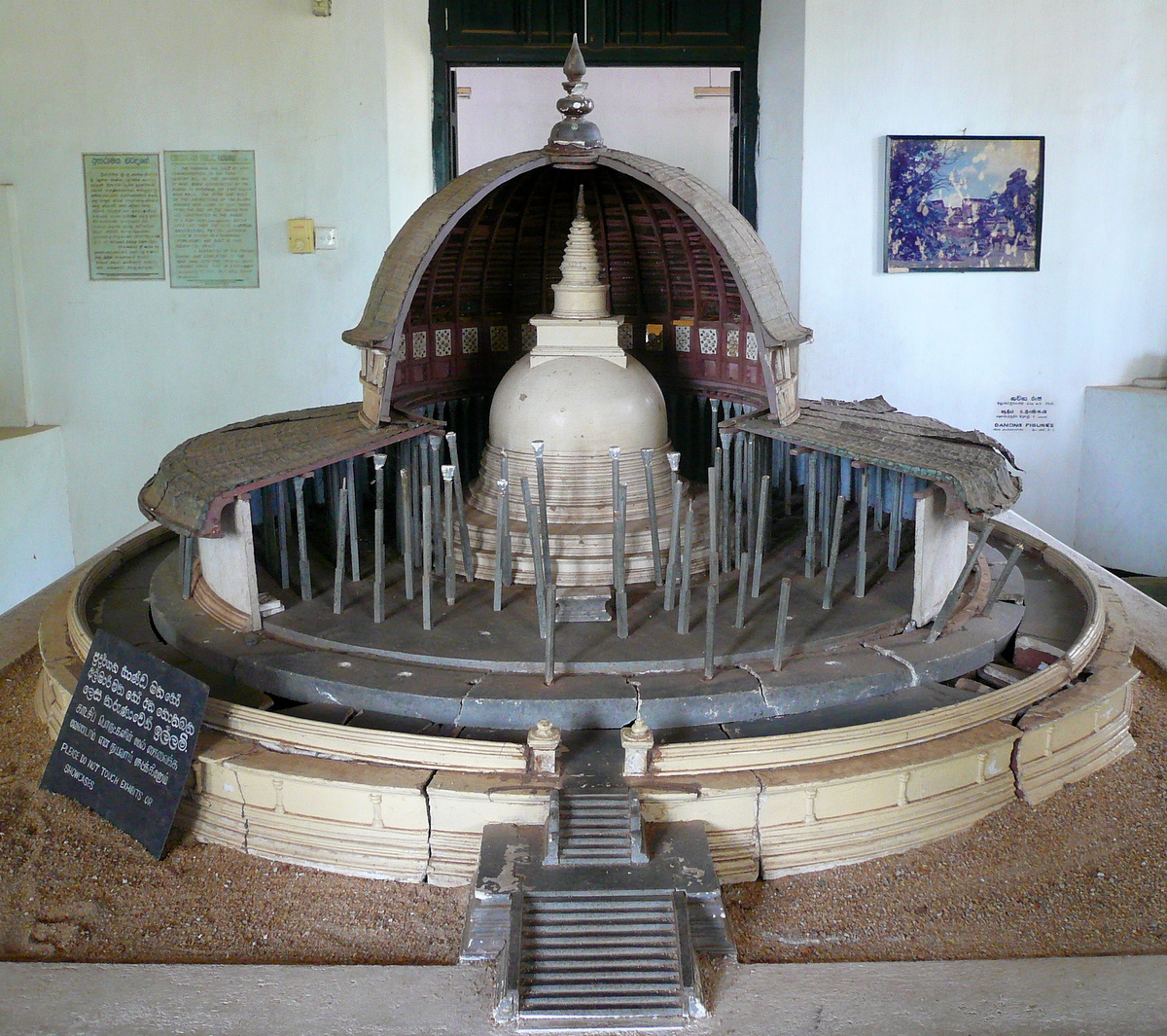
A model of the Thuparama stupa surrounded by a vatadage. This stupa was part of the Mahavihara complex at Anuradhapura.

According to K. M. de Silva, Buddhism was well established in the main settlements of the Kingdom of Anuradhapura by the first century BCE. Over time, Anuradhapura Theravada adopted and assimilated various pre-Buddhism elements. The first records of Sri Lankan Buddha images come from the reign of the King Vasabha (65–109 CE), and after the 3rd century CE the historical record shows a growth of the worship of Buddha images as well as of bodhisattvas.

From the 5th century to the eleventh century, the island of Sri Lanka saw continuous warfare between Sinhala kings and south Indian invaders (mainly the Cholas, Pallavas and Pandyas). Buddhist institutions suffered terribly during these various invasions and conflicts. However, in spite of the instability, this era also saw the expansion of Buddhist culture, arts and architecture. By the 9th century, Buddhist monasteries were powerful institutions who owned property, land, estates, and irrigation works. They were basically self sufficient economic units under the protection of the Sinahala monarchs.

Between the reigns of Sena I (833–853) and Mahinda IV (956–972), the city of Anuradhapura saw a "colossal building effort" by various kings during a long period of peace and prosperity, the great part of the present architectural remains in this city date from this period. However, this was followed by the conquest of Anuradhapura by the Chola empire (between 993 and 1077). By the time that the island was reconquered by Vijayabahu I (1055–1110), the monastic sangha had mostly ceased to exist and had to be reintroduced by inviting Burmese monks to the island to restart monastic ordinations.

=== Development of the Pāli textual tradition ===
The Sri Lankan Buddhist Sangha initially preserved the Buddhist scriptures (the Tipitaka) orally as it had been traditionally done in India. However, according to the Mahavamsa, during the first century BCE, famine and wars led to the writing down of these scriptures in order to preserve the teachings. Richard Gombrich remarks that this is "the earliest record we have of Buddhist scriptures being committed to writing anywhere". With few exceptions, surviving Theravādin Pāli texts derive from the tradition of the Mahāvihāra at Anuradhapura.

Later developments included the formation and recording of the Theravāda commentary literature (Atthakatha). According to Theravāda sources, there was a tradition of Indian commentaries on the scriptures which existed during the time of Mahinda. There were also various commentaries in Sinhala, such as the "Great commentary" of the Mahavihara school, which is now lost.

As a result of the work of later South Indian scholars who were associated with the Mahāvihāra, mainly Buddhaghosa (4th–5th century CE), Dhammapala and Buddhadatta, Sri Lankan Buddhists adopted Pali as their main scholastic language. These figures wrote new commentaries in Pali (basing themselves on the old Sinhala works). This adoption of a lingua franca allowed the Sri Lankan tradition to become more international, allowing easier links with the community in South India and Southeast Asia.

Theravāda monks also produced other Pāli works such as historical chronicles (e.g. Mahavamsa), hagiographies, practice manuals, textbooks, poetry, and doctrinal summaries of Theravada Abhidhamma, such as the Abhidhammavatara. Buddhaghosa's works, especially the Visuddhimagga, are the most influential texts (apart from the Pāli Canon) in the Theravāda tradition.

=== Sri Lankan Theravāda sects ===
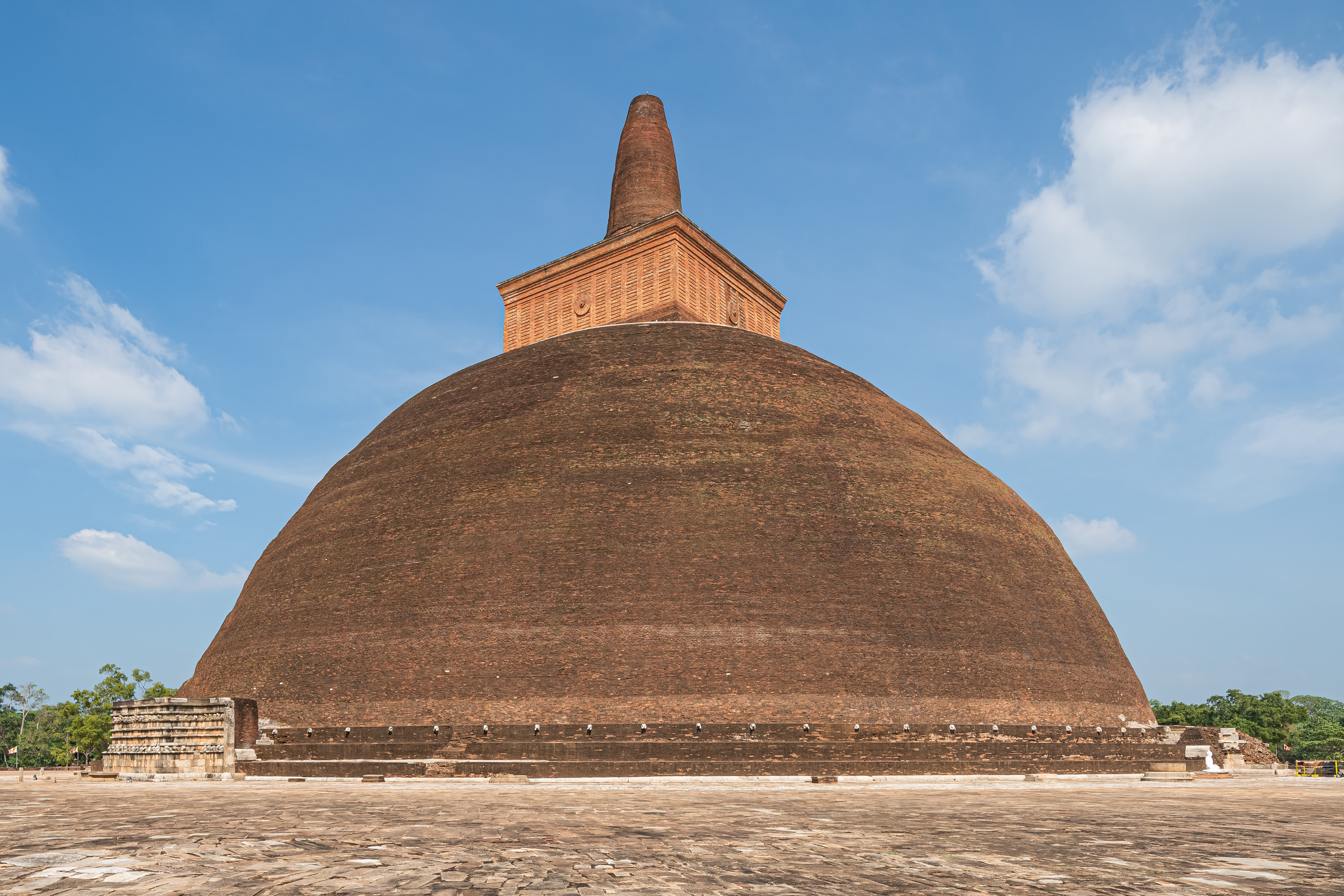
The restored Abhayagiri Dagoba (stupa) in Anuradhapura

Over much of the early history of Buddhism in Sri Lanka, there were three subdivisions of Theravāda, consisting of the monks of the Mahāvihāra, Abhayagiri vihāra and Jetavana, all based in Anuradhapura. The Mahāvihāra was the first tradition to be established, while Abhayagiri and Jetavana developed out of it.

When the Chinese monk Faxian visited the island in the early 5th century, he noted 5000 monks at Abhayagiri, 3000 at the Mahāvihāra, and 2000 at the Cetiyapabbatavihāra.

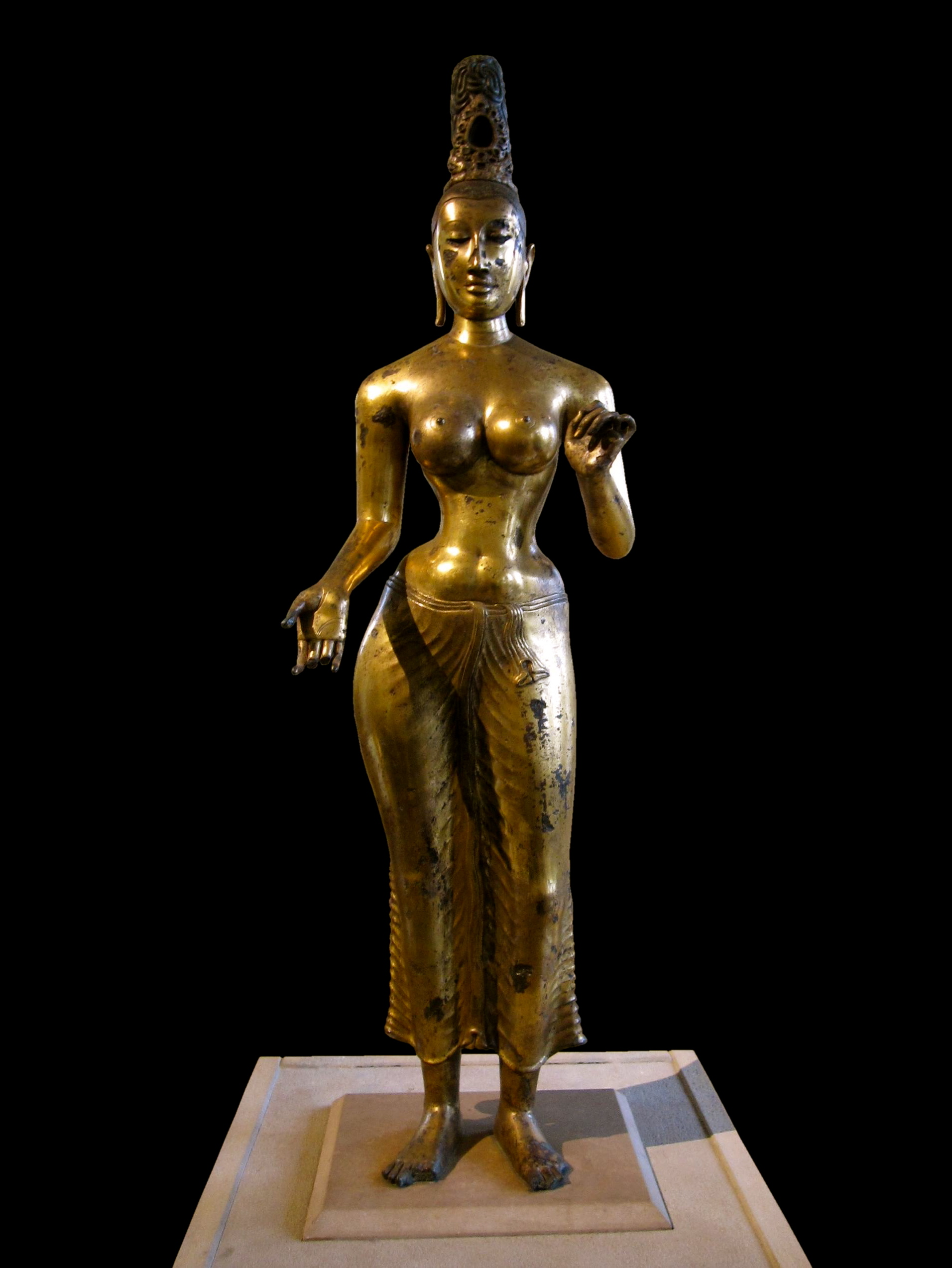
Gilded bronze solid cast statue of the Bodhisattva Tara, Sri Lanka, 8th century CE. This sculpture was found on the east coast of Sri Lanka between Batticaloa and Trincomalee and is evidence of the presence of Mahayana Buddhism in the Anuradhapura period of Sri Lanka.

Abhayagiri Theravādins maintained close relations with Indian Buddhists over the centuries, adopting many of the latter's teachings, including many Mahāyāna elements, whereas Jetavana Theravādins adopted Mahāyāna to a lesser extent. The Mahāvihāra tradition meanwhile considered many of the Mahāyāna doctrines, such as Lokottaravāda ("transcendentalism"), as heretical and considered the Mahāyāna sutras as being counterfeit scriptures.

Religious conflict among these sects was also not unusual. During the reign of Voharika Tissa (209-31 CE), the Mahāvihāra tradition convinced the king to repress the Mahāyān teachings, which they saw as incompatible with the true doctrine. The reign of king Mahasena (277 to 304 CE) for example, was marked by his support of Mahāyāna Buddhism and his repression of the Mahāvihāra tradition (and destruction of their monastery) which refused to convert to Mahāyāna. The Mahāvihāra tradition would not regain its dominant position until the Polonnaruwa period in 1055.

Abhayagiri was an influential university and center for the study of Mahāyāna and Vajrayana from the reign of Gajabahu I until the 12th century. Throughout its history, Abhayagiri was an influential center of scholarship, with numerous scholars working in Sanskrit and Pāli. Akira Hirakawa and David Kalupahana have argued that Mahāyāna influence can even be found in the Pāli commentaries of the Mahāvihāra school.

=== Medieval Sri Lanka ===
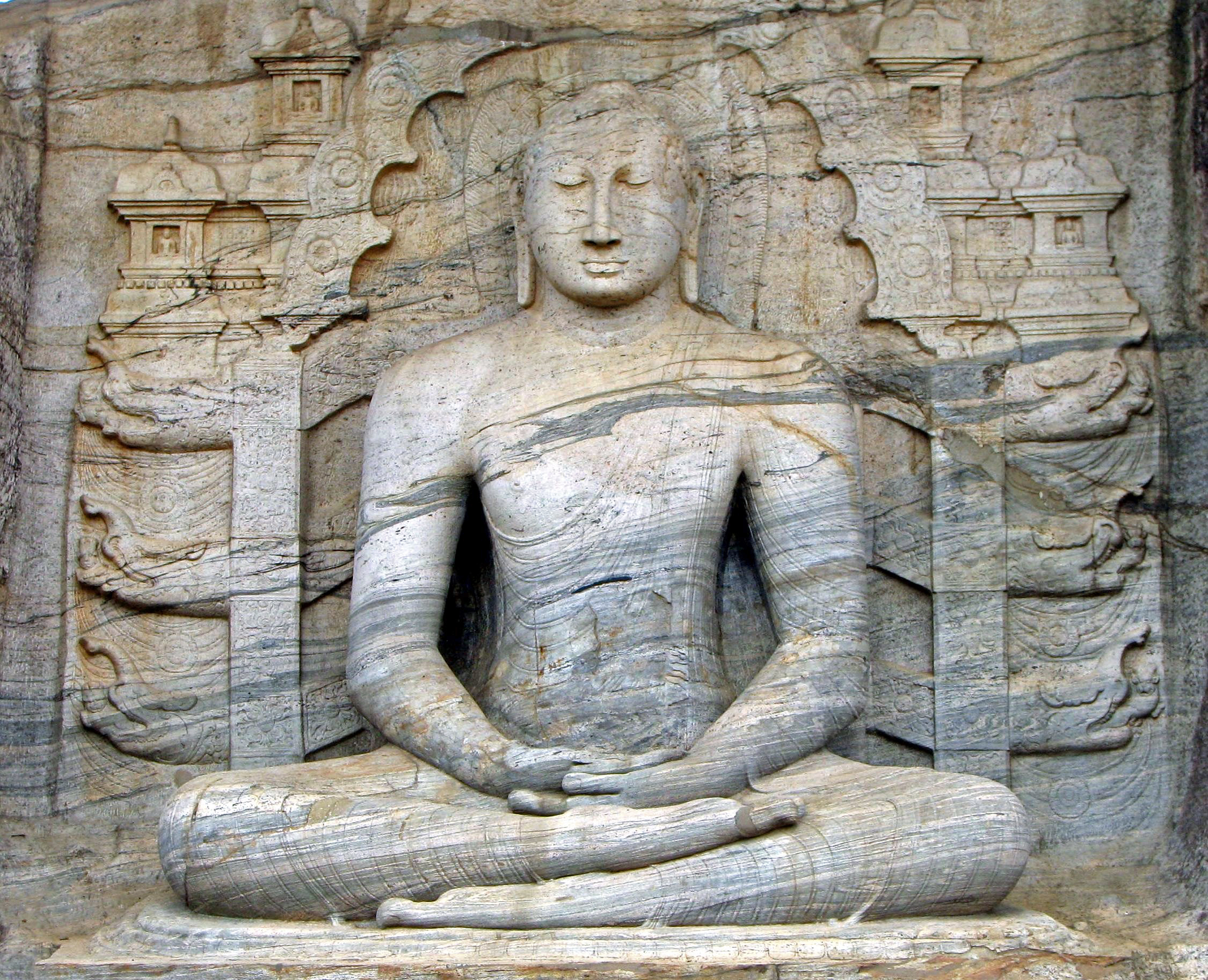
Parakramabahu I commissioned various religious projects such as Gal Vihara ('The Stone Shrine') in Polonnaruwa features three statues of the Buddha in three different poses carved from the same large rock.

The next influential figure in Sinhala Buddhism was Parākramabāhu I (1153–1186) who unified the island and promoted extensive reform of what he saw as a divided and corrupt sangha. Sinhala chronicles state that the Buddhist sangha was in conflict at this time, while many monks had even married and had children. According to some sources, some monks were defrocked and given the choice of either returning to the laity, or attempting re-ordination under the new unified Theravāda tradition as "novices" (sāmaṇera).

De Silva notes that this reform was traditionally seen as the triumph of the Mahāvihāra and the repression of the other schools, but that "recent research has shown this to be quite inaccurate." All Buddhist institutions had been severely damaged by the war with the Cholas, and the three main traditions had fragmented into eight sects. Parākramabāhu united all of these into a common community, which seems to have been dominated by the Mahāvihāra. However, this did not bring an end to sectarian competition completely.

Parākramabāhu I is also known for rebuilding the ancient cities of Anuradhapura and Polonnaruwa, restoring Buddhist stupas and Viharas (monasteries). He appointed a Sangharaja, or "King of the Sangha", a monk who would preside over the Sangha and maintain discipline.

The Polonnaruva era also saw a flowering of Pali language Theravāda scholasticism with the work of prominent Sri Lankan scholars such as Anuruddha, Sāriputta Thera, Mahākassapa of Dimbulagala and Moggallana Thera. They worked on compiling subcommentaries to the Tipitaka, grammars, summaries and textbooks on Abhidhamma and Vinaya such as the influential Abhidhammattha-sangaha of Anuruddha.

After the reign of Parākramabāhu I, the island saw further waves of Indian invaders, forcing the Sinhala monarchs to retreat to the south again. The island's political instability also led to the decline of monastic discipline. Sinhala kings attempted to stem this decline through directly purging the sangha of undisciplined monks and also by appointing sangharajas (chief of the sangha).

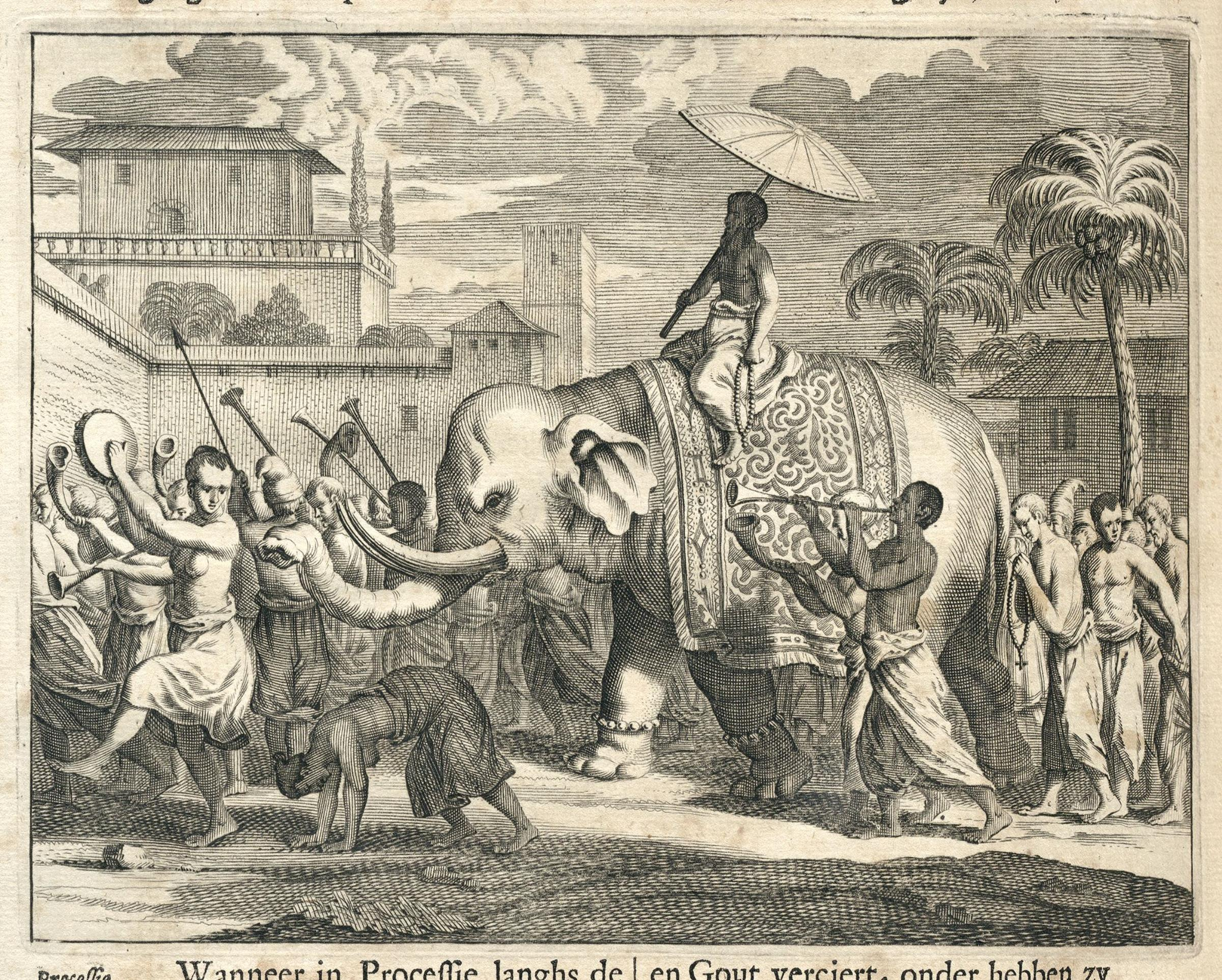
Dutch painting of a Buddhist religious festival in Ceylon, c. 1672

Sri Lanka remained politically divided from its late medieval period to the colonial period, and it was only unified when the island was absorbed into the British Empire in 1815. During this period of division, the Kingdom of Kandy (1469–1815) remained the main state patron of Theravada. The Kandyan Theravāda sangha grew increasingly weak during this era and monastic ordination lineages disappeared numerous times. Because of this, Kandyan kings had to reintroduce higher ordination from Southeast Asia. For example, in 1592, Vimaladharmasuriya I invited Burmese monks to reintroduce the Theravada ordination. Meanwhile, the elder monk Weliwita Sri Saranankara (1698–1778) also had to restore higher ordination on the island by inviting monks from Thailand (thus founding the modern Siam Nikaya).

=== Southeast Asia ===
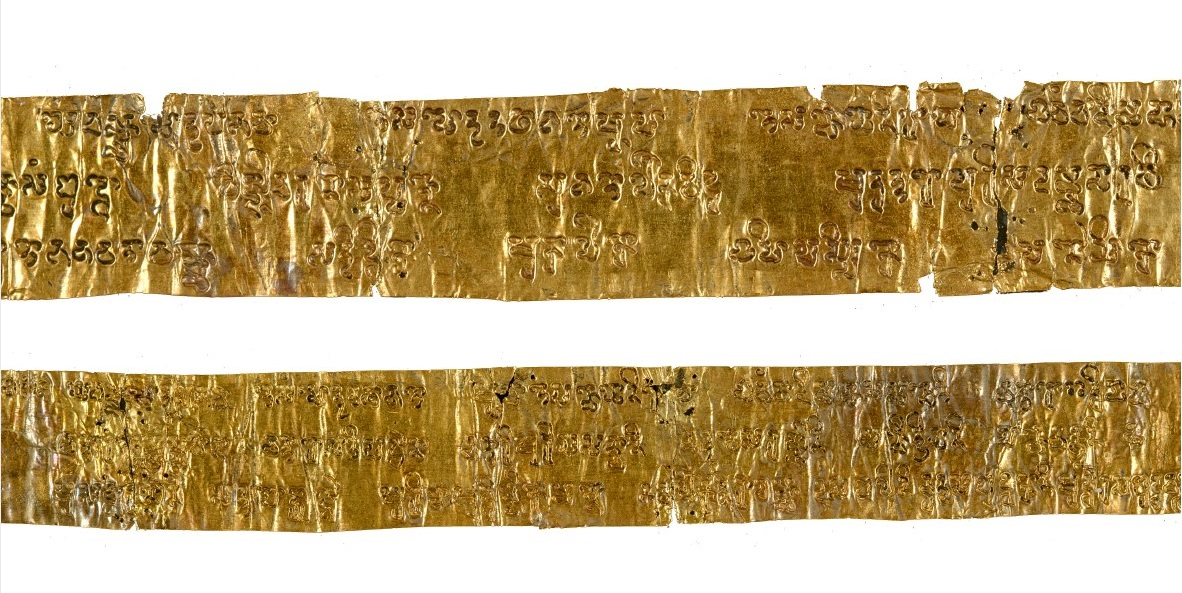
Gold Plates containing fragments of the Pali Tipitaka (5th century) found in Maunggan (a village near the city of Sriksetra).

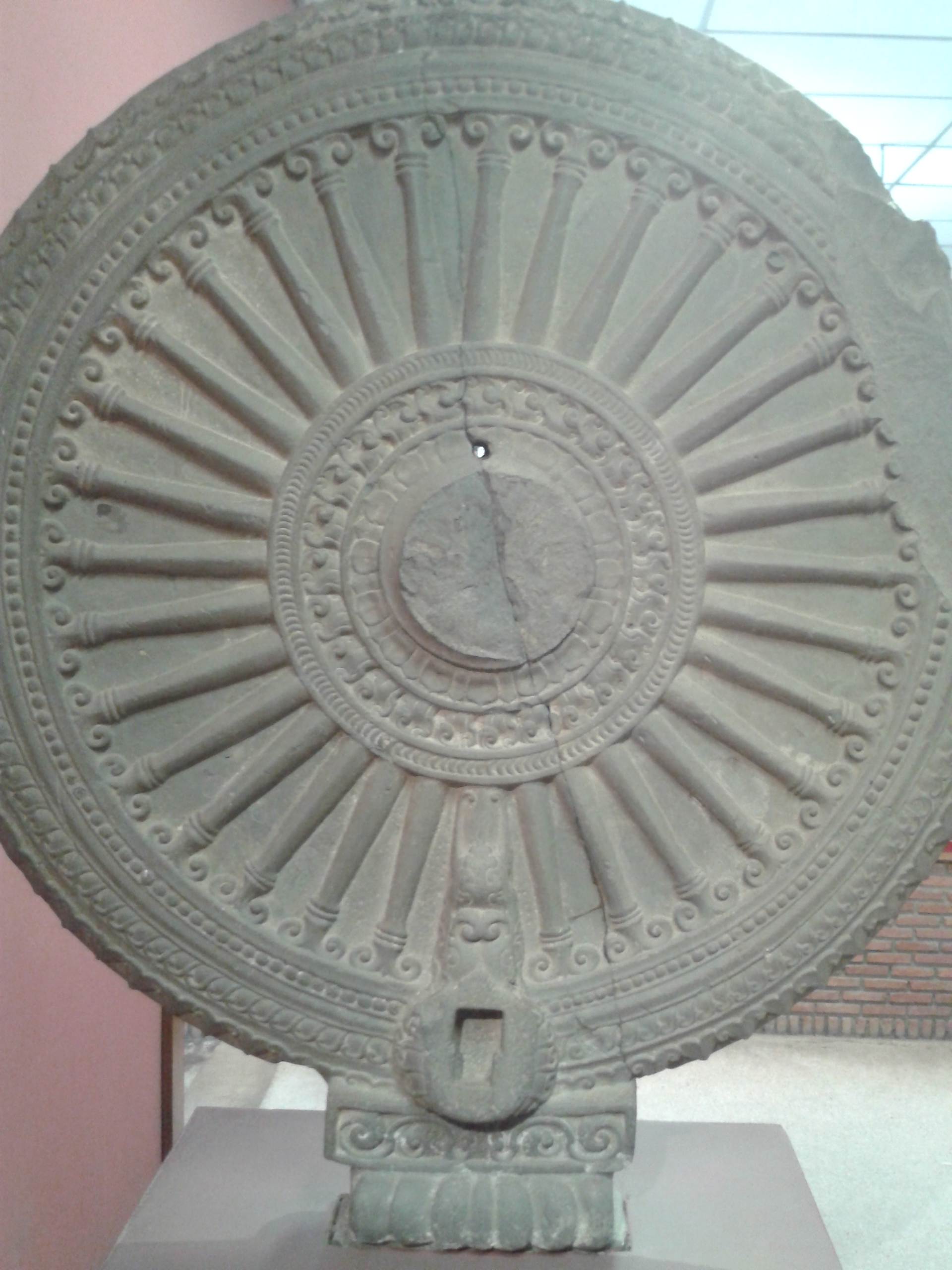
Dvaravati period stone dharma wheel, Phra Pathom Chedi National Museum

According to Theravāda sources, one of the Ashokan missions was sent to Suvaṇṇabhūmi ("The Golden Land"), and was led by two monks, Sona and Uttara. Scholarly opinions differ as to where exactly this was located, but it is generally believed to have been somewhere in Southeast Asia.

Epigraphical evidence has established that Theravāda became a dominant religion in the Pyu Kingdom of Sriksetra and the Mon kingdom of Dvaravati, from about the 5th century CE onwards. The oldest surviving Buddhist texts in the Pāli language are 5th to 6th century gold plates found at Sri Ksetra.

From the 8th to the 12th centuries, Indian religions (including Mahāyāna, Vajrayana and Theravāda as well as Hinduism) continued to influence Southeast Asia via the Bay of Bengal. Starting at around the 11th century, Sinhalese Theravada monks and Southeast Asian elites led a widespread conversion of most of mainland Southeast Asia to the Theravāda Mahavihara school.

During the pre-modern era, Southeast Asian Buddhism included numerous elements which could be called esoteric. The French scholar François Bizot has called this trend "Tantric Theravāda", and his textual studies show that it was a major tradition in Cambodia and Thailand. Forms of Esoteric Theravāda include what has been called the "Yogāvacara tradition" associated with the Sri Lankan Yogāvacara's manual (c. 16th to 17th centuries). These esoteric traditions included new practices and ideas which are not included in orthodox Theravāda, such as the use of mantras (such as Araham), magic, complex rituals and visualization exercises. These practices were particularly prominent in Thailand before the modernist reforms of King Rama IV (1851–1868) as well as in pre-modern Sri Lanka. Some of these practices are still prevalent in Cambodia and Laos today.

==== Myanmar ====
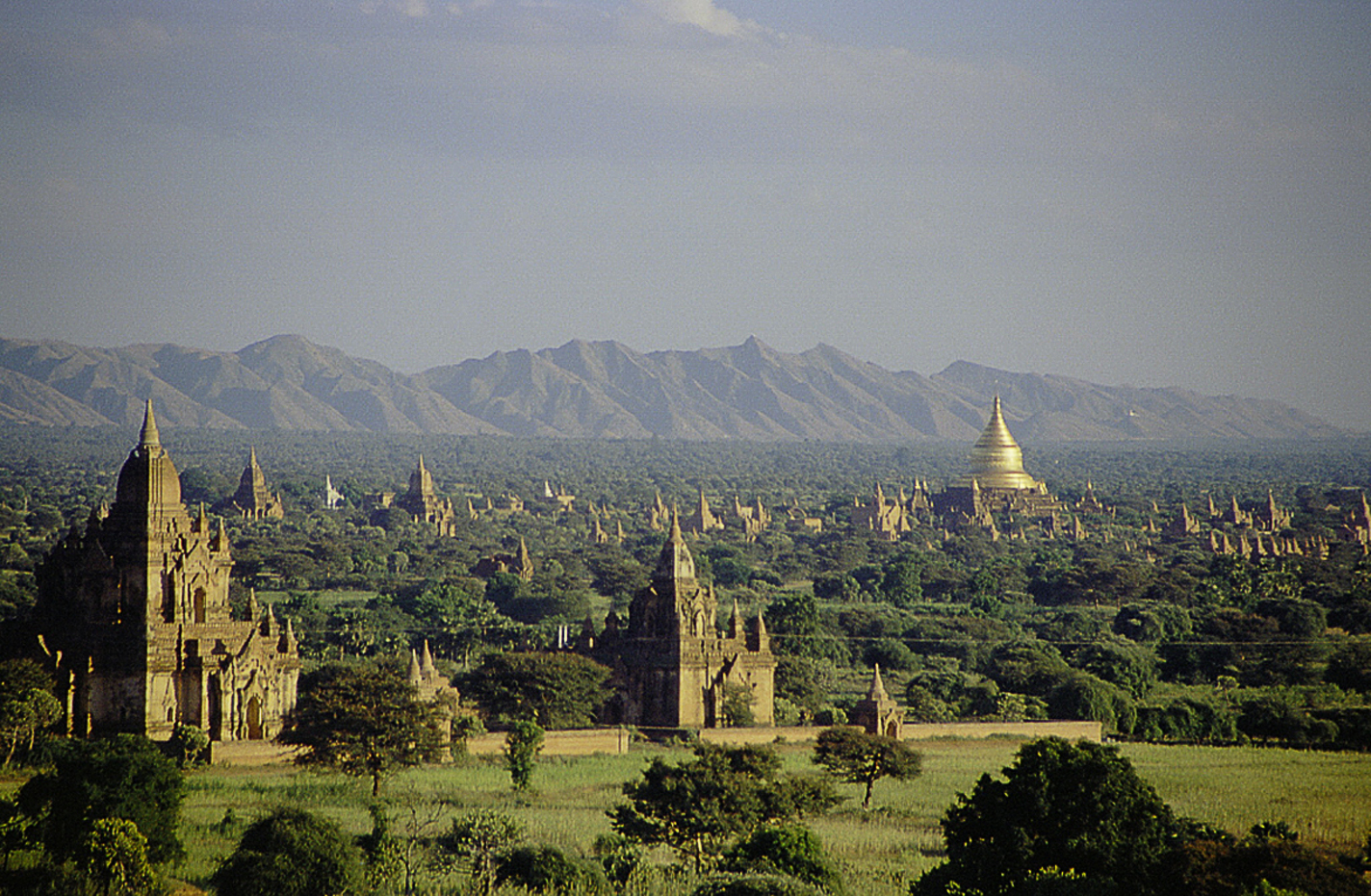
Ruins of the ancient capital of Bagan. There are currently more than 2,000 temples, while during the height of Bagan's power, there were some 13,000.

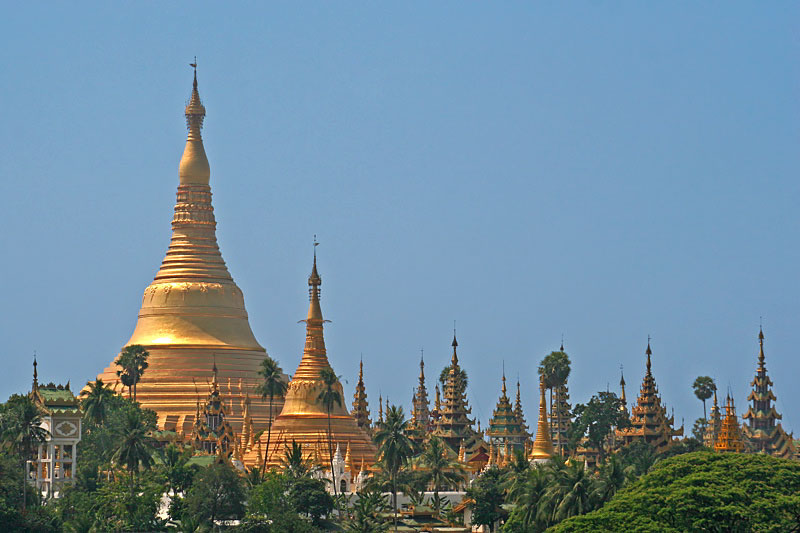
The Shwedagon Pagoda was built in the kingdom of Hanthawaddy

The Burmese people adopted Theravāda as they came into contact with and conquered the Pyu and Mon civilizations. During the reign of king Anawrahta (Pali: Aniruddha, 1044–1077), Theravāda became the main religion of the Burmese Bagan Kingdom (849–1297).

Anawrahta invited numerous Mon, Indian and Sinhalese Theravāda monks to Bagan to propagate and reform Theravāda in his kingdom. Furthermore, various priests of the esoteric Ari Buddhism who refused to conform to the reforms were banished. Anawrahta also patronized the construction of the Shwezigon Pagoda and the Shwesandaw Pagoda. After his reign, Theravāda Buddhism remained the dominant form of Buddhism among the Burmese elites. However, the worship of animist spirits called Nats as well as various Mahayana figures such as Lokanat continued to be practiced alongside Theravāda.

Later Burmese kings of the Taungoo dynasty (1510–1752) and the Konbaung dynasty (1752–1885) continued to promote Theravāda Buddhism in the traditional manner of a Dharma King (Dhammaraja). This included patronizing monastic ordinations, missionaries, scholarship and the copying of scripture as well as establishing new temples, monasteries and animal sanctuaries. This sustained state support allowed Theravāda Buddhism to penetrate into the rural regions of the country. By the 18th, village monasteries were a common feature of every Burmese village and they became a main center of education.

Burmese kings like Bayinnaung (r.1551–1581) and Bodawpaya (1745–1819) also attempted to stamp out certain non-Buddhist religious practices, particularly those related to animal sacrifice and alcohol consumption. Bodawpaya also established a system of monastic examinations, which allowed them to weed out monks who were not knowledgeable (and who therefore presumably had only ordained to escape taxes or military service).

==== Cambodia ====
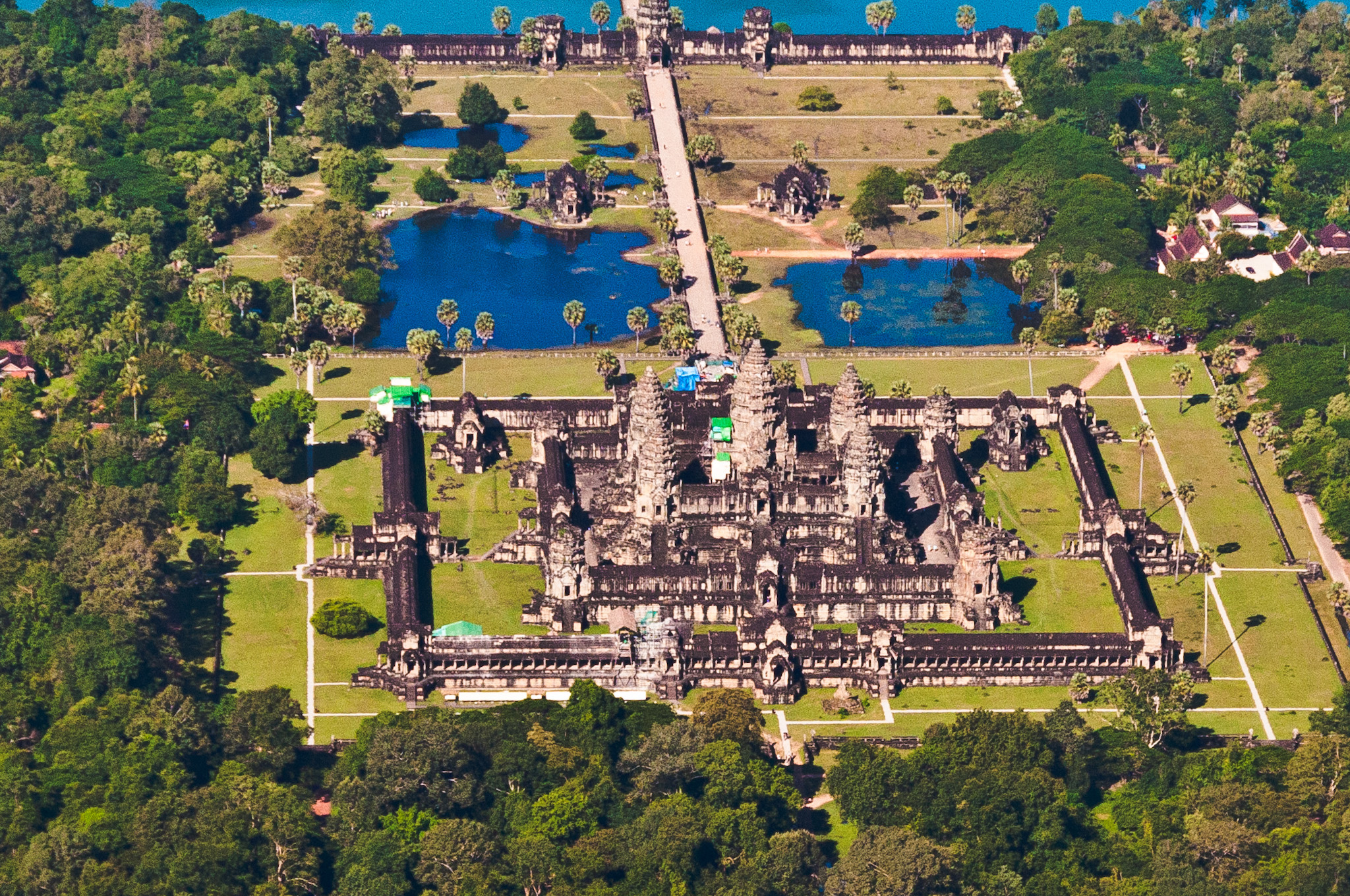
Angkor Wat, initially dedicated to Vishnu, was later remodeled and converted into a Theravada complex

The Khmer Empire (802–1431) centered in Cambodia was initially dominated by Brahmanical Hinduism and Mahayana Buddhism. The Late Angkorian period saw beginning of the rise of Theravāda Buddhism, though details are scarce. During the 13th and 14th centuries, the work of missionary monks from Sri Lanka, Burma and Thailand continued to spread Theravāda in Cambodia. According to Ian Harris, by the time Jayavarmadiparamesvara took the throne in 1327, Theravāda was well established in the kingdom, as is attested by statuary which survives from this era.

After the fall of Angkor in 1431, Mahayana mostly disappeared from the region and Theravāda became the dominant religion. During the reign of king Sattha (Paramaraja IV, 1576–1594), the central sanctuary at Angkor Wat was remodeled in Theravāda style. New Buddha images and a giant Thai-influenced Buddha-foot was added. Theravāda monasteries also grew around the temple complex at this time, such as Wat Preah Indr-Kosiy. Numerous Theravāda monastic communities grew up around this time, and most were established in converted Brahmanical and Mahayana temples. Examples include Wat Sithor, Wat Prampil Lvaeng at Angkor Thom and Wat Nokor. After this period, most Khmer monarchs supported Theravāda Buddhism in the traditional manner of a Southasian Dharma King.

==== Thailand ====
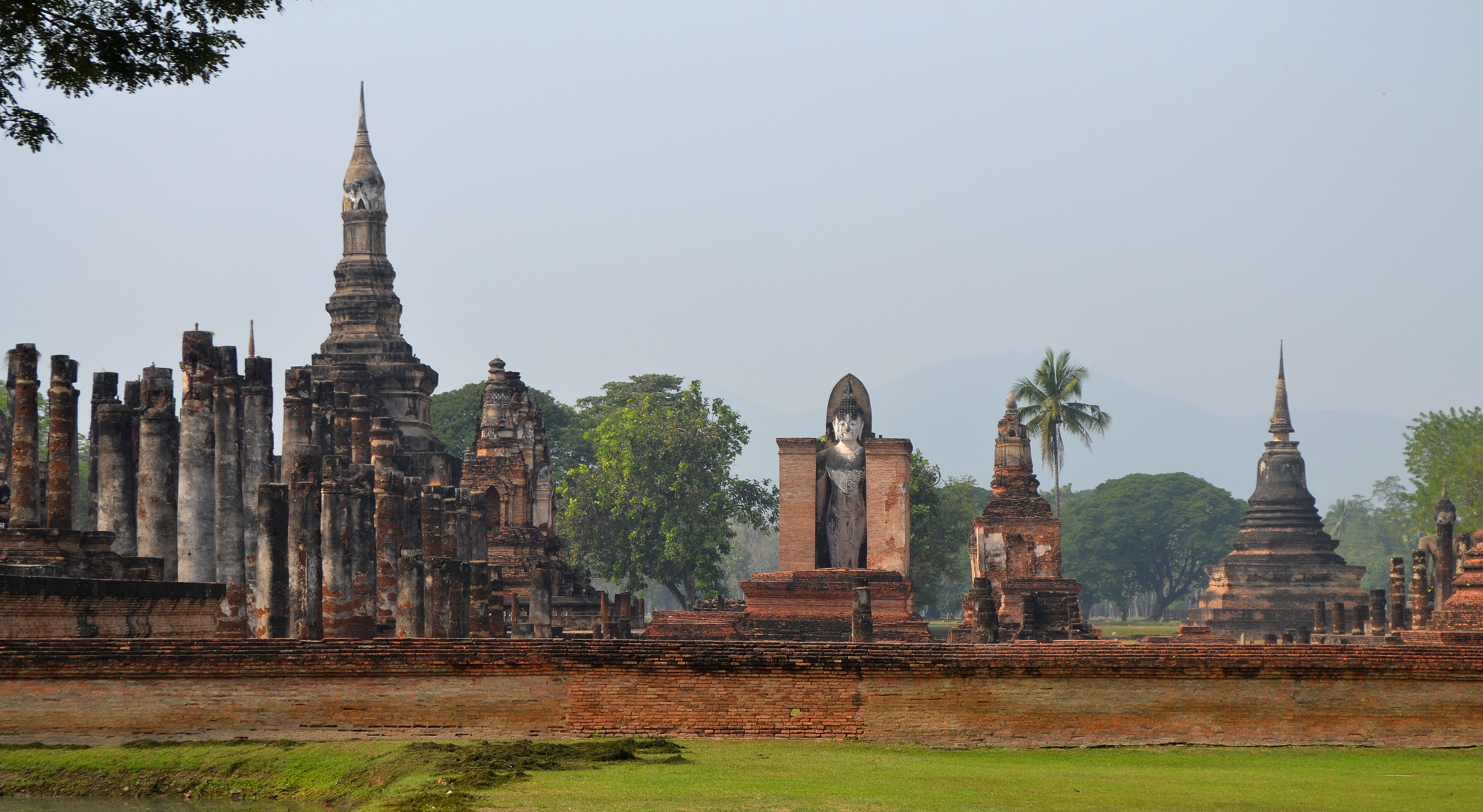
Sukhothai Historical Park, Thailand.

In the Sukhothai Kingdom (13th-15th century), Theravāda, Mahāyāna, as well as Khmer Brahmanism were all practiced at first. King Ram Khamhaeng (fl. late 13th century) was the first Thai king to give his full royal support to the Sinhalese Theravāda school. He patronized Buddhism in the traditional way, by providing material support for the sangha and building temples such as Wat Chang Lom.

Later Thai kings would continue his policy of focusing their patronage on Sinhalese Theravāda. The monarchs of the later Thai Kingdom of Ayudhya (1351–1767) remained strong supporters of Theravāda as well. Some Sukhothai and Ayudhya monarchs even chose to ordain as Theravāda monks for a brief period of time, a tradition which continued to be practiced by Thai kings in the modern era. Ayudhya kings also invaded Cambodia and Cambodian Theravāda was a major influence on Thai Buddhist architecture and scholarship. Part of this legacy is the fact that most Pali manuscripts in Thailand before the modern era used the Khmer script. By the late 17th century, an examination system for Buddhist monks had also been established by the Thai monarchy.

==== Laos ====
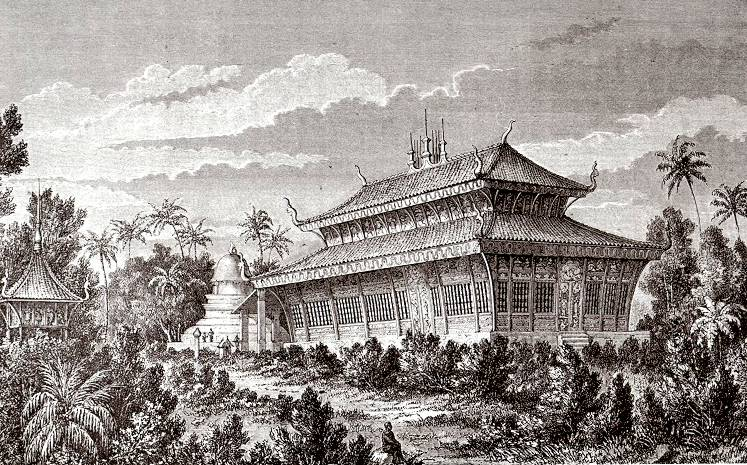
Wat Visoun, the oldest temple in continuous use in Luang Prabang.

Like in other Southeast Asian countries, medieval Buddhism in Laos included Mahāyāna Buddhism, Tantric Buddhism and Theravāda Buddhism. The political influence of Southeast Asian Theravāda helped make it the main religion of the Laotian kingdom of Lan Xang (1353–1707), which had close ties to the Thai and Khmer realms. Like in other regions, Laotian Theravāda also retained numerous "animistic" elements like the veneration of local spirits (lak muang) and magical objects (sing saksit). These practices were often part of Buddhist temples. Lao kings like Vixun (r. 1500 - 1520) adopted the Dharma king model of Theravāda Buddhism, promoted the establishment of temples (such as Vat Simuang and Pha That Luang) and palladiums (sacred protectors) such as Phra Bang.

== Modern History ==
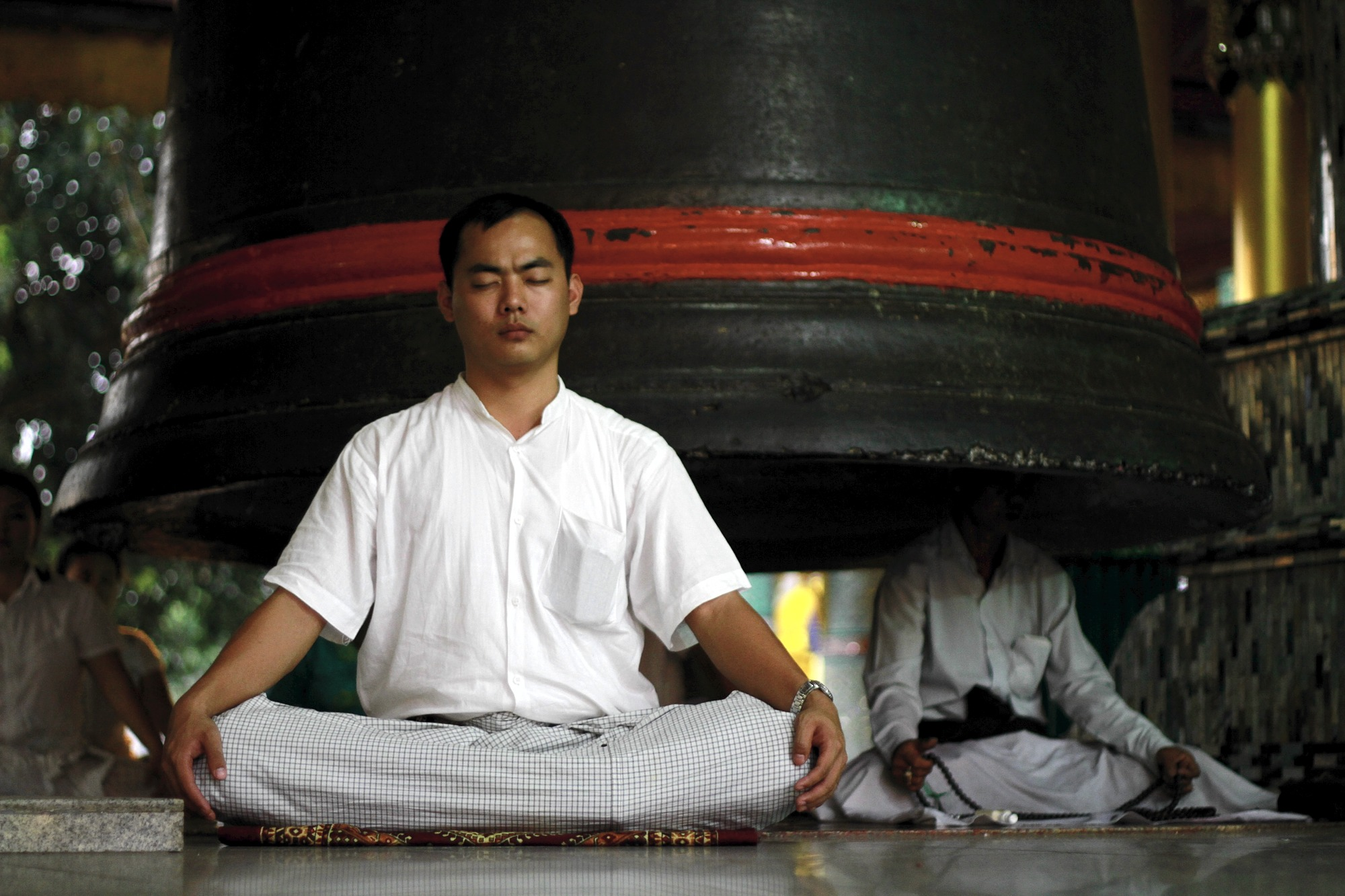
A Burmese man meditates in Myanmar. The widespread practice of meditation by laypersons is a modern development in Theravāda.

In the 19th and 20th centuries, Theravāda Buddhists came into direct contact with western ideologies, religions and modern science. The various responses to this encounter have been called "Buddhist Modernism". Part of the Buddhist modernist project was a reaction to the challenge and threat posed by Western colonialism and Christian missionaries.

In the British colonies of Ceylon (modern Sri Lanka) and Burma (Myanmar), Buddhist institutions lost their traditional role as the prime providers of education (a role that was often filled by Christian schools). In response to this, Buddhist organizations were founded which sought to preserve Buddhist scholarship and provide a Buddhist education. Meanwhile, in Thailand (the only Theravāda nation to retain its independence throughout the colonial era), the religion became much more centralized, bureaucratized and controlled by the state after a series of reforms promoted by Thai kings.

There are several major trends and movements in the Theravāda "Buddhist Modernism", some of the most important are:

- Radical return to the roots of Theravāda Buddhism (especially the Pali Canon). This has been influenced by the work of western Buddhist Studies scholars and by the reforms of modern Buddhist leaders like Mongkut.
- Revival of forest monasticism (see: Thai forest tradition, Sri Lankan forest tradition)
- Revival of meditation by monks and laypersons (see: vipassana movement).
- Reassertion of women's rights. This includes the revival of the Theravāda bhikkhuni (female monastic) lineage.
- Convert Buddhism in Western countries, which includes the establishment of Western monastic orders (especially the Thai forest tradition) and meditation centers like Insight Meditation Society as well as the development of Buddhist scholarship in Western languages.
- Social and political action, which includes movements related to engaged Buddhism, Buddhist socialism and Buddhist nationalism. This may include protesting and participating in election politics by both lay and monastic Buddhists.
- A skepticism towards or outright rejection of traditional Buddhist folk practices (like the veneration of spirits or ghosts) which are often seen as unscientific.
- Buddhist forms of environmentalism.

=== Modern Sri Lankan Theravāda ===
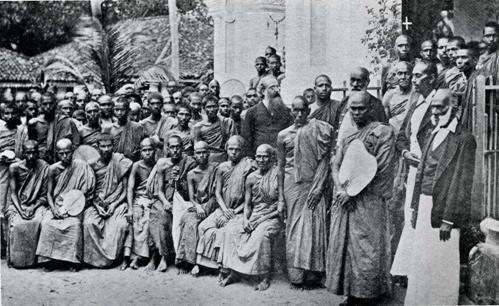
Henry Olcott and Buddhists (Colombo, 1883).

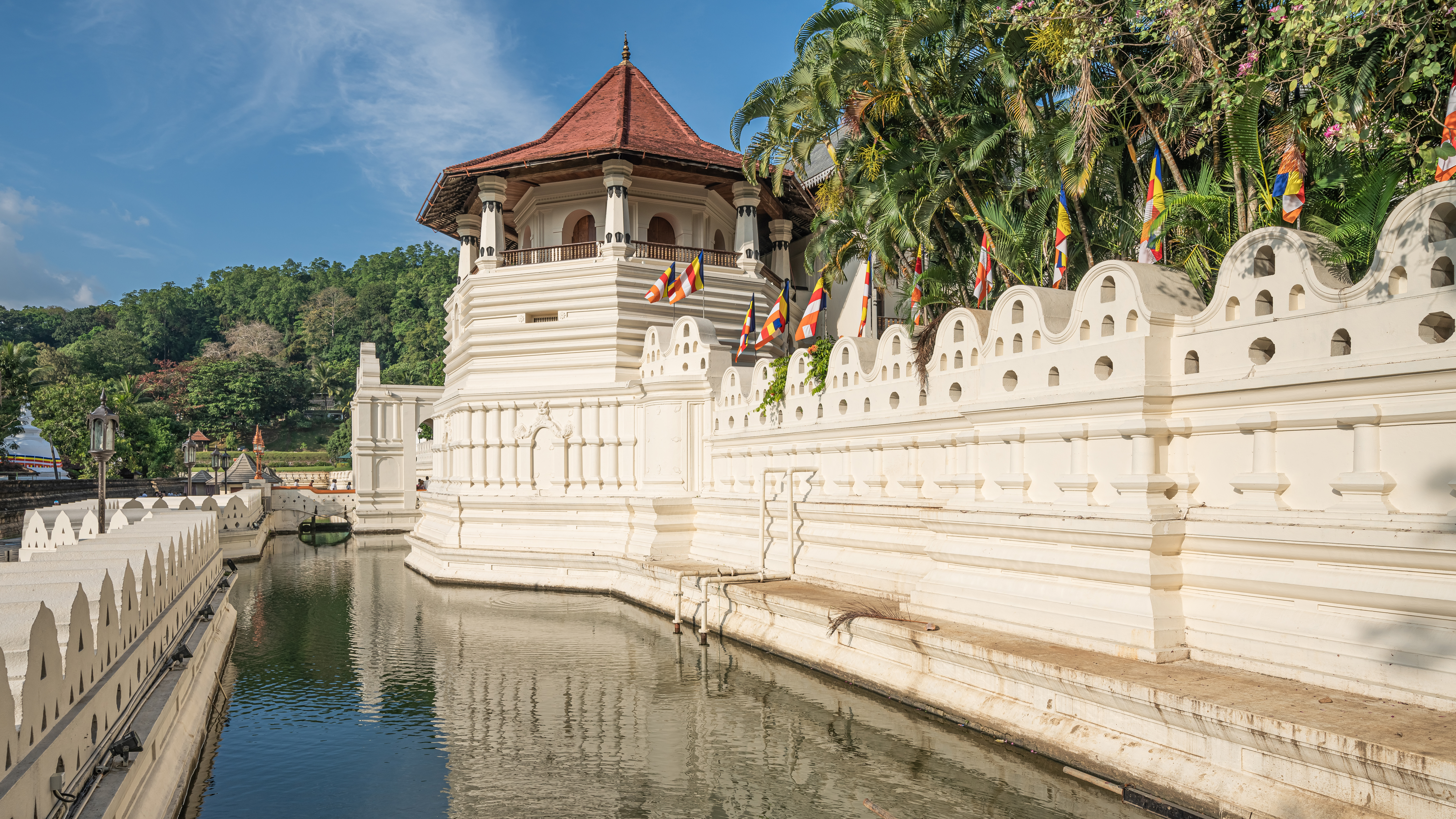
The Temple of the Tooth was renovated during the Buddhist revival.

In the 19th century, Sri Lanka Theravādins became active in spreading Buddhism through publishing newspapers and setting up schools and colleges. They also debated Christians missionaries (either in print or in public). Anagarika Dharmapala was one of the main Theravāda leaders of the Sri Lankan Buddhist revival. Dharmapala appealed to laypersons, providing them with a national identity and a modern religious practice.

Sinhalese Buddhists were aided by the Theosophical Society. The theosophist Henry Steel Olcott helped Sinhala Buddhists in the founding of schools and developing Buddhist popular literature such as his ‘Buddhist Catechism’ (1881). He was one of the first western Buddhist converts.

Two new monastic orders were formed in the 19th century, the Amarapura Nikaya and the Ramanna Nikaya. From the 1950s onwards, the Sri Lankan Forest Tradition developed into an influential modern tradition, focused on strict monastic discipline, meditation and forest living.

=== Modern Theravāda in Myanmar ===
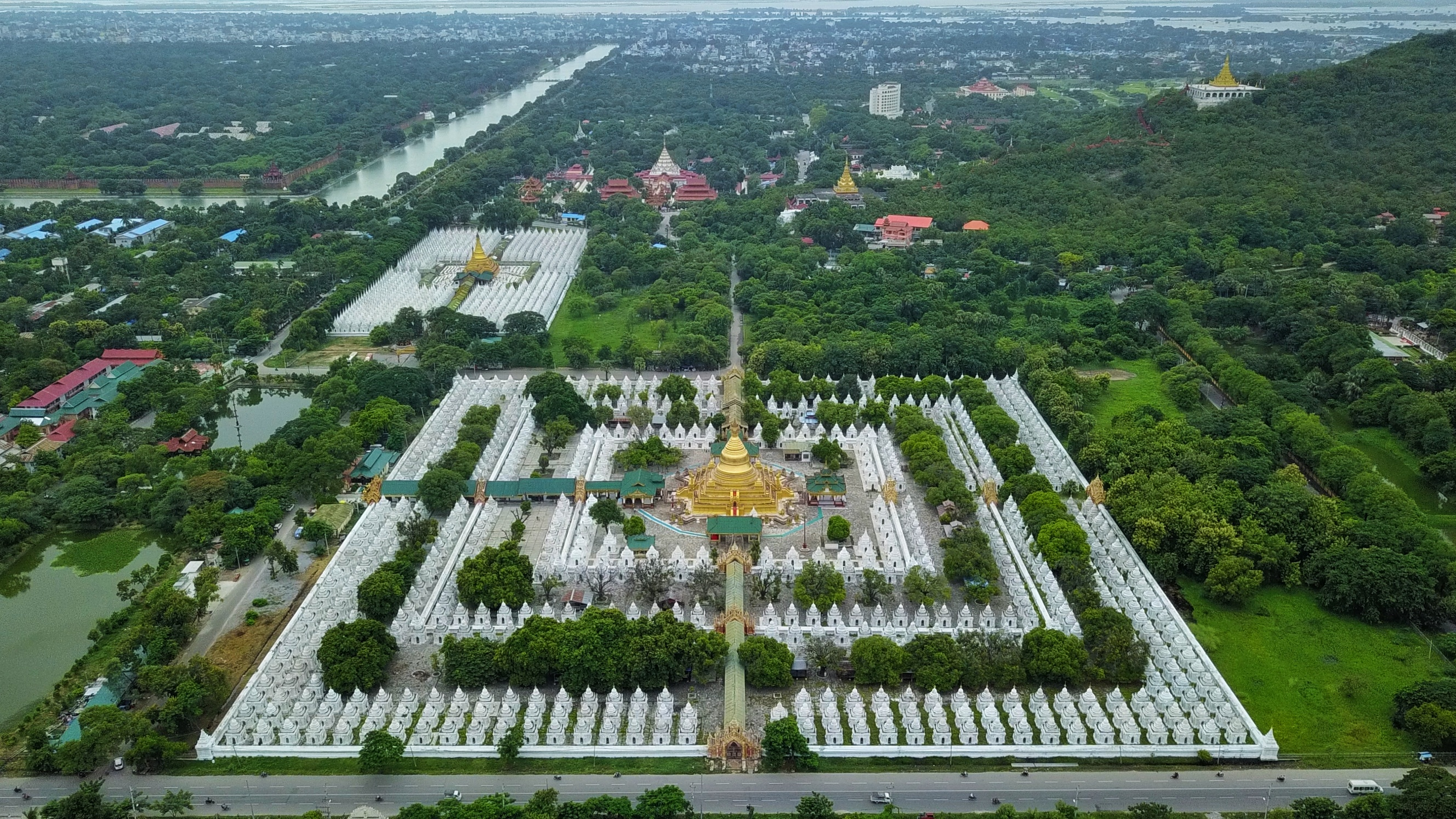
The Kuthodaw Pagoda complex, each of the 729 stone-inscription caves contains a marble slab inscribed on both sides with text from the Pali Canon.

An influential modernist figure in Myanmar was king Mindon Min (1808–1878), known for his patronage of the Fifth Buddhist council (1871) and the Tripiṭaka tablets at Kuthodaw Pagoda (still the world's largest book). During his reign, various reformist sects came into being such as the Dwaya and the Shwegyin, who advocated a stricter monastic conduct. Ngettwin Sayadaw was a popular reformer during the 19th century. He was known for requiring his monks to practice vipassana meditation and for teaching meditation to laypersons.

During the period of British Burma (from 1824 to 1948), there were constant tensions between Christian missionaries and Buddhist monks (which included one of the first Western convert monks, U Dhammaloka). The perceived decline of Buddhism among the Burmese people led to a revival movement which took many forms including the foundation of lay Buddhist organizations and the founding of new Buddhist schools. Another part of this revival, which is known as the "vipassana movement", focused on meditation and doctrinal learning. Ledi Sayadaw (1846–1923) was one of the key figures in this movement. At the same time, the unorthodox Buddhist tradition known as weikza-lam ("Path of esoteric knowledge", or "Path of the wizards") was also developing.

Buddhist monks and lay organizations also became involved in the struggle for Burmese independence. After independence, Myanmar held the Sixth Buddhist council (Vesak 1954 to Vesak 1956), which was attended by monks from eight Theravāda nations. The Council created a new redaction of the Pāli Canon, the Chaṭṭha Saṅgīti Piṭaka (Sixth council Pitaka) which was then published by the government in 40 volumes.

In the 20th century, the vipassana movement grew into an international movement. The "New Burmese method" was developed by U Nārada and popularized by his student Mahasi Sayadaw, Sayadaw U Pandita and Nyanaponika Thera. Other teachers developed alternative meditation systems, including Webu Sayadaw, U Ba Khin and his student S. N. Goenka, Mogok Sayadaw, Sunlun Sayadaw, and Pa Auk Sayadaw. In the 20th century, numerous western students traveled to Asia, studied Burmese Buddhist meditation and then brought it to western countries.

Recently, Buddhists in Myanmar have become involved in political activism, either as part of pro-democracy movements protesting military rule (such as the All Burma Monks’ Alliance) or as part of Buddhist nationalist organizations (like Ma Ba Tha).

=== Modern Thai Theravāda ===
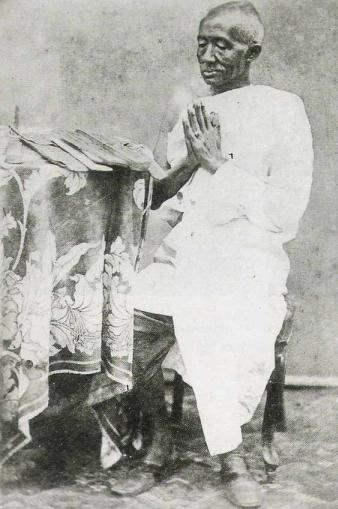
From 1824 to 1851 Prince Mongkut spent his life as a monk.

Throughout the 19th and 20th century, Thai Rattanakosin kings passed various laws which re-organized the sangha into a more hierarchical and centrally controlled institution. This included the introduction of the modern office of sangha leader (sangharaja) as well as the establishment of a national monastic examination system.

One of the most influential kings was Mongkut (r. 1851–1868), who had been a monk himself for twenty-seven years and was learned in Pāli as well as western literature (he knew Latin and English). Mongkut led a reform movement and founded a new monastic order called the Dhammayuttika Nikaya. This movement advocated a stricter adherence to monastic discipline, emphasized the study of the Pali Canon and rejected folk beliefs which were seen as not in line with the scriptures. Mongkut's heir, Chulalongkorn (1868–1910) continued the centralizing reforms by passing the Sangha Law of 1902, which organized the sangha into a hierarchical bureaucracy headed by a Sangha Council of Elders (Pali: Mahāthera Samāgama).

Another key figure of the reforms was Prince Wachirayan Warorot (1860–1921), who wrote most of the textbooks which were used in the new monastic examination system. He was the leading intellectual of the era and his doctrinal interpretations remain the orthodox Thai Buddhist doctrine.

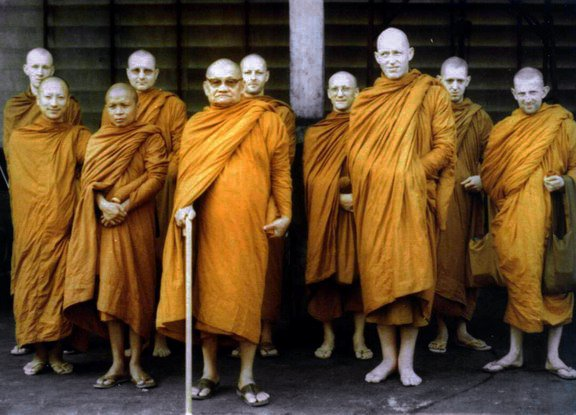
Thai Forest teacher Ajahn Chah with Ajahn Sumedho (front right), Ajahn Pasanno (rear and left of Sumedho) and other monastics.

In the early 1900s, Thailand's Ajahn Sao Kantasīlo and his student, Mun Bhuridatta, led the Thai Forest Tradition revival movement which focused on forest monasticism, and strict adherence to the vinaya. Notable 20th century forest Ajahns included Ajahn Thate, Ajahn Maha Bua and Ajahn Chah.

The reign of Rama VIII (1935–1946) saw the translation of the entire Pali Canon into the Thai language. The vipassana movement arrived in Thailand in the 1950s. Since then there has been an increase in the practice of meditation by laypersons and monastics. The late 20th century also saw the rise of new religious movements like Wat Phra Dhammakaya and Santi Asoke.

=== Modern Theravāda in Cambodia and Laos ===
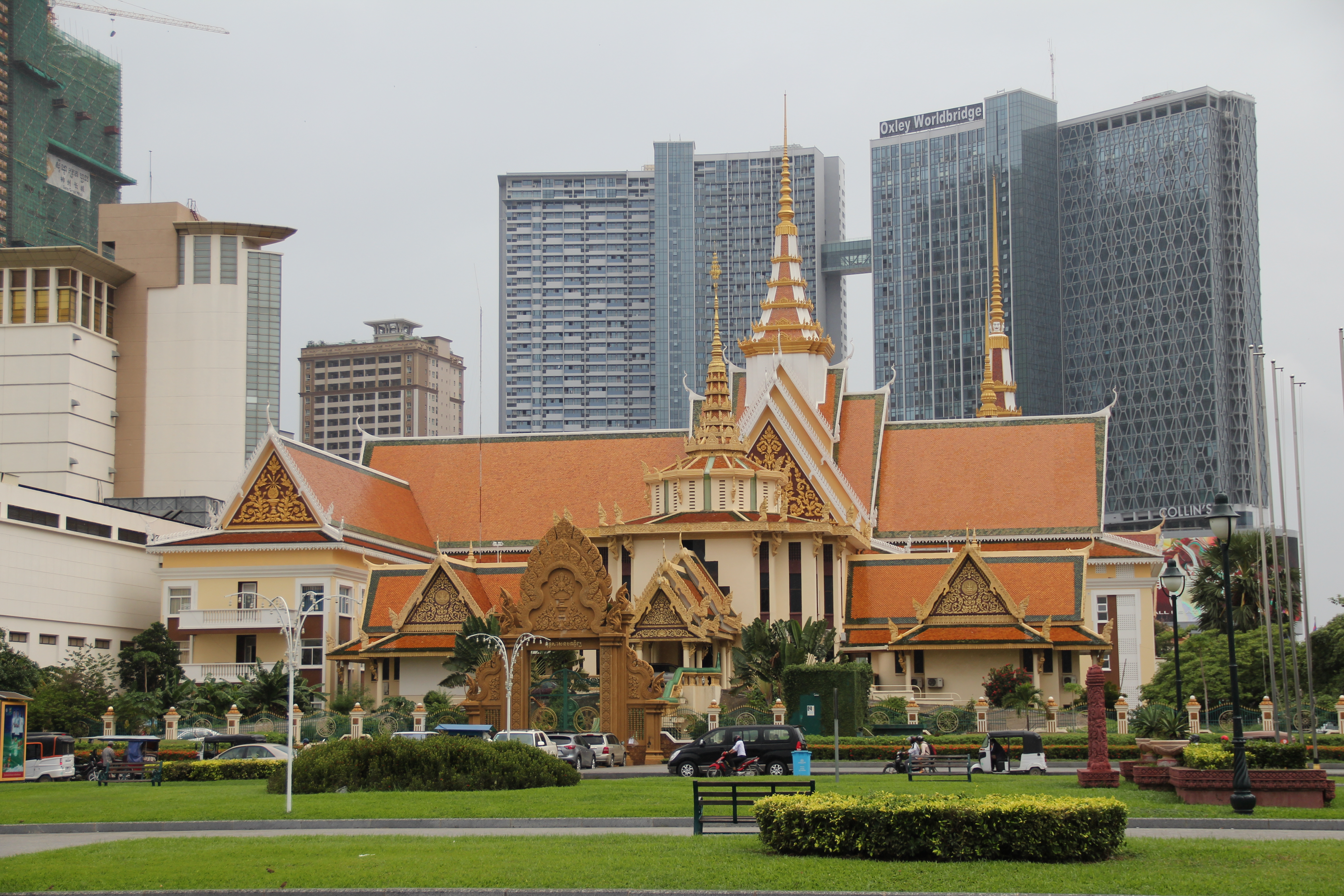
The Buddhist Institute in Phnom Penh

Theravāda Buddhism in Cambodia and Laos went through similar experiences in the modern era. Both had to endure French colonialism, civil wars and communist governments. During the modern period, Cambodian and Laotian Theravāda sanghas were both influenced by modern Thai Buddhism as well as by French Indology. The Thai Dhammayuttika Nikaya was introduced into Cambodia during the reign of King Norodom (1834–1904) and benefited from royal patronage. The Dhammayuttika Nikaya was also introduced into Laos. Under French Rule, French indologists of the École française d'Extrême-Orient became involved the reform of Cambodian and Laotian Buddhism. The French set up institutions for the training of Cambodian and Lao monks, such as the Ecole de Pali which was founded in Phnom Penh in 1914.

Theravāda remained a dominant cultural force in Cambodia until the rule of the Khmer Rouge. The Khmer Rouge sought to wipe out Buddhism, and their efforts effectively destroyed Cambodia's Buddhist institutions. Many monks were killed, forced to disrobe or flee while numerous temples were destroyed. After the end of the communist regime a new unified Cambodian Sangha was re-established by monks who had returned from exile. According to Ian Harris, contemporary Cambodian Theravāda includes both "modernists" and "traditionalists". While the Modernists focus on meditation and Buddhist philosophy and are open to modern secular knowledge, the traditionalists focus on traditional merit making practices, such as reciting Pali texts. An important figure of modern Cambodian Theravāda is Maha Ghosananda who promoted a form of engaged Buddhism to effect social change.

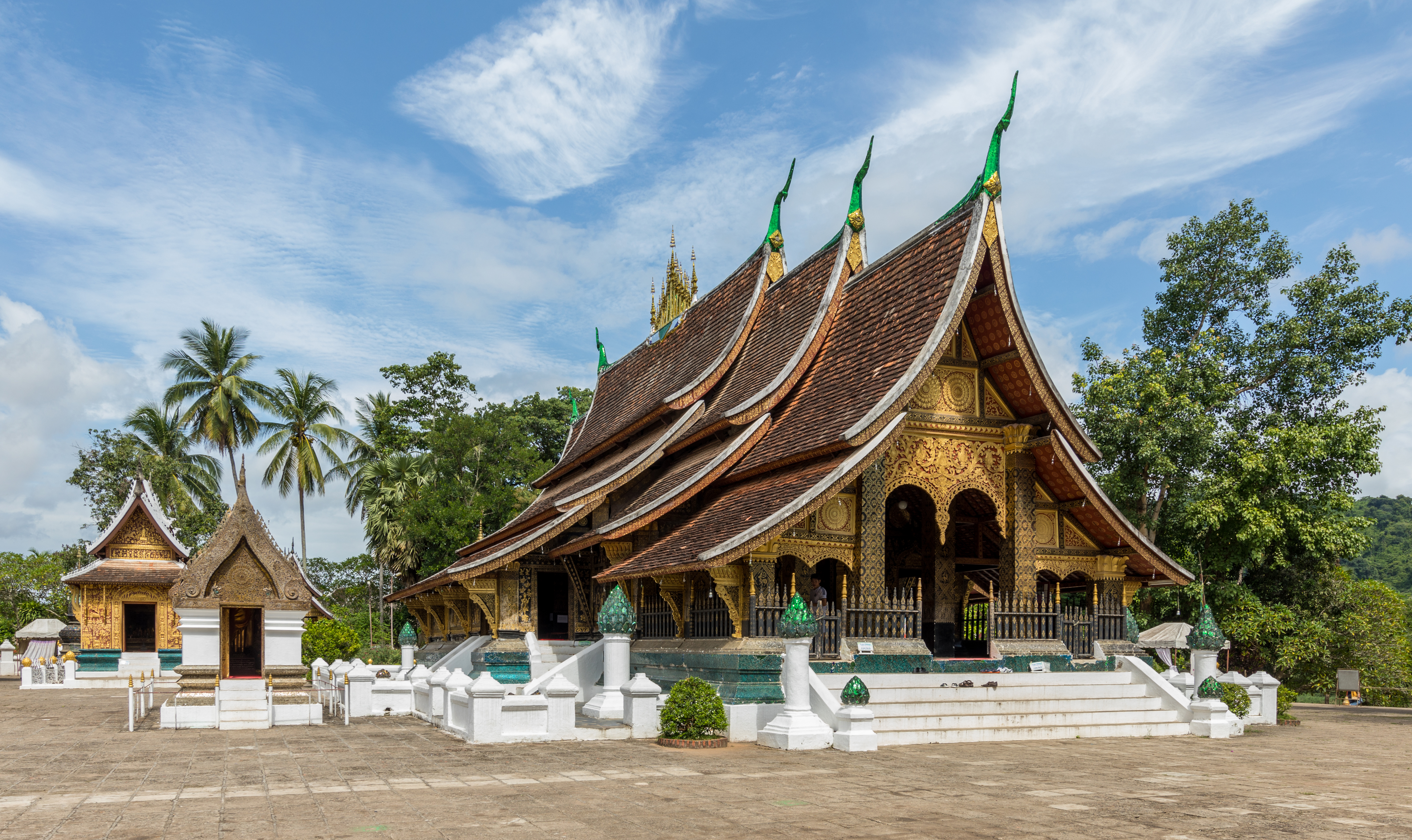
Wat Xieng Thong, Luang Prabang, Laos

In contrast, communist rule in Laos was less destructive than in Cambodia and the communist Pathet Lao party sought to make use of the sangha for political ends. After the establishment of the People's Democratic Republic in 1975, some Lao monks worked with the party to promote the official Buddhist ideology which combined Buddhism with Marxism (and rejected traditional teachings like karma, as well as heaven and hell realms). The sangha was re-organized as the Lao United Buddhists Association, which was controlled directly by the communist party. Monks were forced to attend indoctrination sessions and political classes and faced criticism from straying from the party line. This led to many dessertions. During the late 1980s and 1990s, the official attitudes towards Buddhism began to liberalise and there was a resurgence of traditional Buddhist activity such as merit making and doctrinal study.

=== South Asia ===
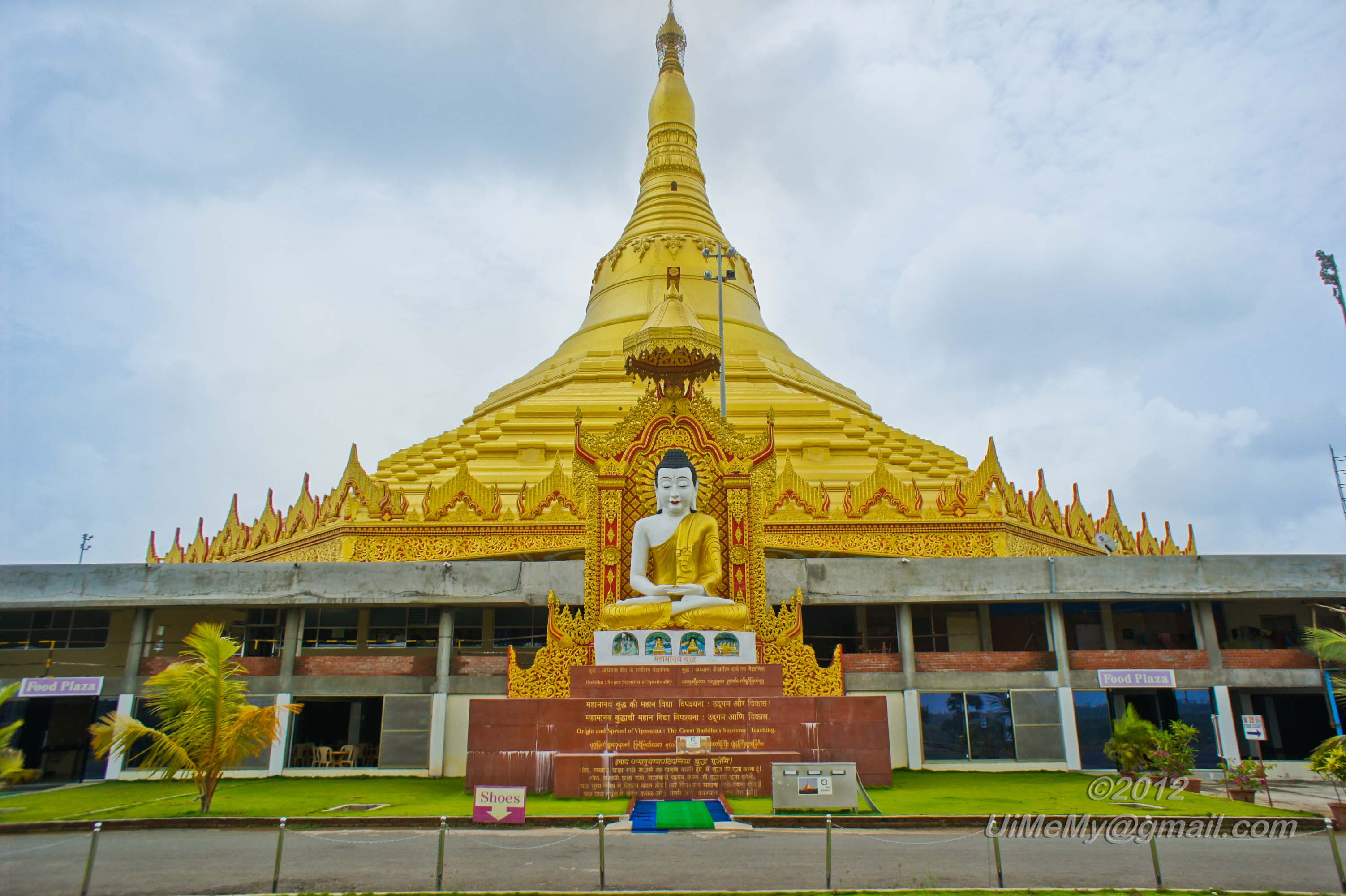
Global Vipassana Pagoda, Maharashtra, India. S.N. Goenka laid the foundation for the structure in 2000 and the pagoda opened in 2009. Regular meditation courses are held at the complex.

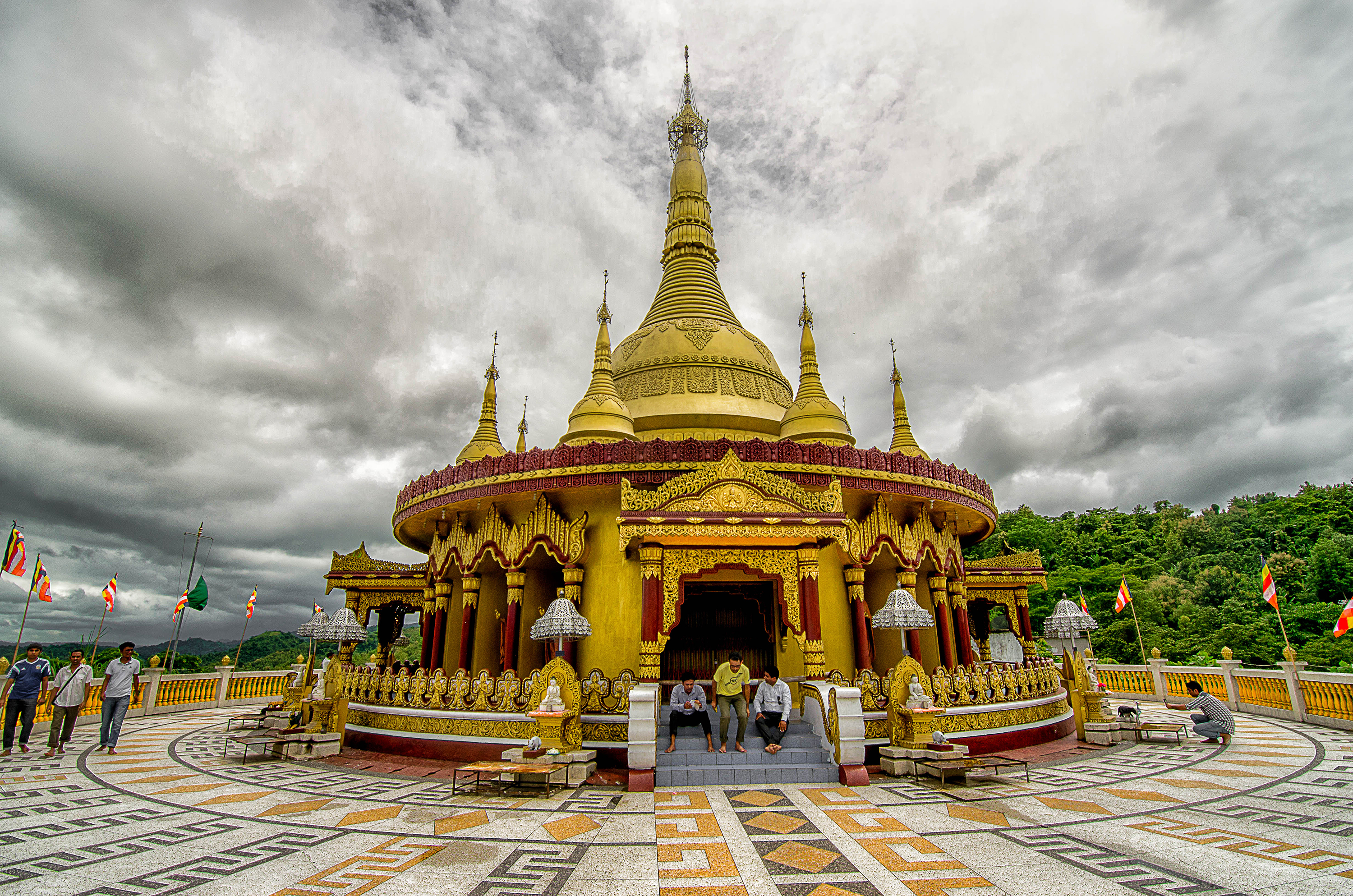
Buddha Dhatu Jadi Temple in Bandarban City, the largest Theravāda temple in Bangladesh.

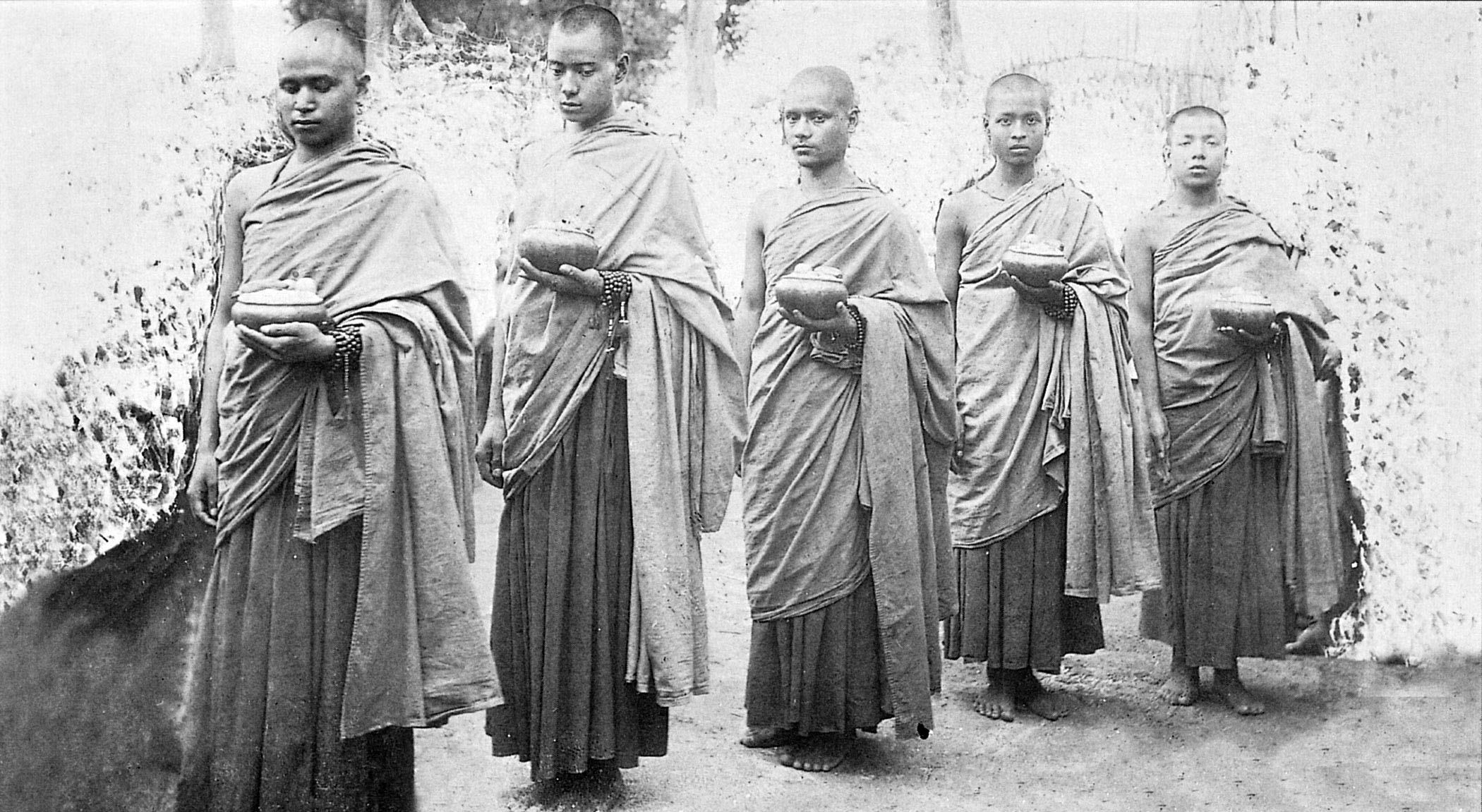
Nepalese bhikkhus. Mahapragya, one of the first Nepalese bhikkhus, is on the far left.

The modern era also saw the spread of Theravāda Buddhism around the world and the revival of the religion in places where it remains a minority faith.

Initially, the revival of Buddhism in India was tied to modernist movements in Sri Lanka and Burma as well as to Theosophy and included organizations such as the Maha Bodhi Society (founded in 1891 by Anagarika Dharmapala), and the Sakya Buddhist Society of Iyothee Thass (1898). The Maha Bodhi Society became known for their conservation and restoration of important Buddhist sites, such as Bodh Gaya and Sarnath. In the 20th century, the vipassana movement was brought to India from Burma by S. N. Goenka.

A Bengali Theravāda movement began in the 19th century with ethnic Baruas like Cainga Thaur and Burmese monks like Saramedha Mahathera who began to introduce Burmese Theravāda in the Chittagong region in 1856. He encouraged the people to give up non-Buddhist practices like animal sacrifice and the worship of Hindu deities. Their efforts saw the establishment of a new Bengali monastic tradition, new temples, and schools as well as organizations devoted to Theravāda Buddhism, such as the Chittagong Buddhist Association. This period also saw the establishment of the Bengal Buddhist Association (in 1892) and the Dharmankur Vihar (1900) in Calcutta by Kripasaran Mahasthavir. Kripasaran was also an avid promoter of Pali language studies. Due to these efforts, most Buddhists in Bangladesh today (about 1% of the population) favor Theravāda Buddhism.

20th century Nepal also saw a modern Theravāda movement which was mostly led by Newars. The first Nepalese monks of this movement were ordained in 1930 by a Burmese bhikkhu called Chandramani (1876–1972) who had established a monastery in Kushinagar. Important figures of the Nepalese Theravāda movement include Dharmaditya Dharmacharya, Mahapragya, Pragyananda and Dhammalok Mahasthavir. Nepalese Theravādins often traveled abroad to India, Burma and Sri Lanka to pursue their studies. The Ananda Kuti, which became the center of the movement, was founded in 1947, with Bhiksu Amritananda as abbot. He would also become the president of the All-Nepal Bhikshu Mahasangha. Throughout the 20th century, many Newars, who traditionally practice a form of Vajrayana, have enthusiastically adopted Theravāda. However, it has recently also begun to spread to other ethnic groups as well. 25-26 In 2009, there were 98 Theravāda monasteries, including 17 nunneries, mostly located in the Kathmandu Valley.

=== China and other Southeast Asian nations ===
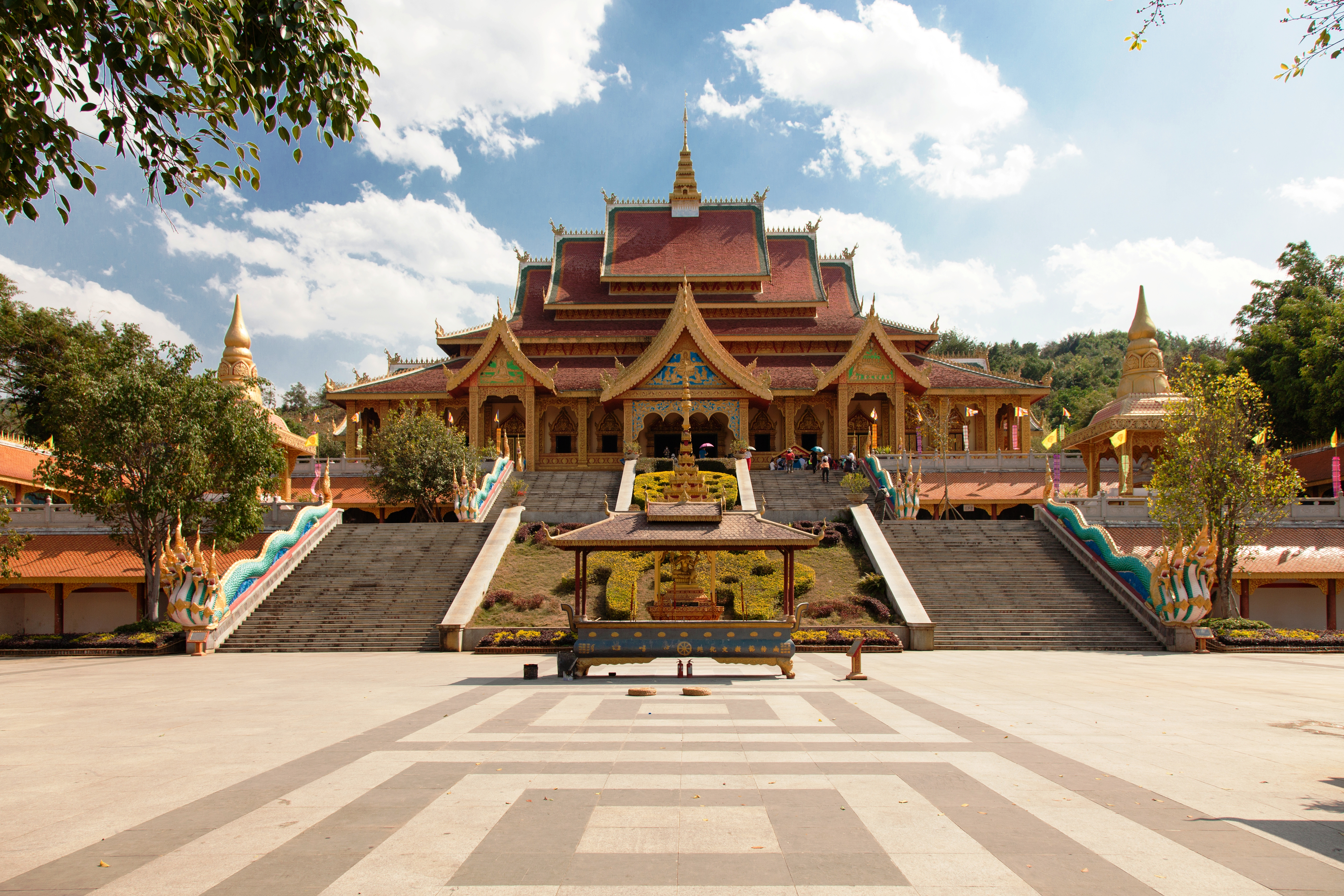
Mengle Temple, a Theravada temple in Jinghong, Xishuangbanna, Yunnan.

During the pre-modern period, Theravāda spread from Thailand into the Chinese province of Yunnan, becoming a major religion among various ethnic groups. Like all Chinese religions, Theravāda suffered from persecution during the Cultural Revolution, but since the 1980s it experienced a revival, with new temples and educational institutions being founded (such as the Buddhist Institute of Yunnan).

In the pre-modern era, Theravāda was practiced in Southern Vietnam by the Khmer people. Under the Nguyễn dynasty (1802–1883), many Khmer Theravādins were persecuted and sometimes forced to abandon their customs and convert to Mahayana. Under French Colonial rule, Vietnamese Khmers could now practice freely and receive a Theravāda education in government schools. During this time, there was also a movement to introduce a Vietnamese form of Theravāda. One of the major figures in this movement was Ven. Hộ-Tông (Vansarakkhita), who had been educated in Cambodia and later helped establish the first ethnic Vietnamese Theravāda temple in Hồ Chí Minh City, Bửu Quang (Ratana Ramsyarama, ets. 1939). Despite numerous setbacks during the Vietnam war and after, Vietnamese Theravāda grew considerably throughout the 20th century and there are now 529 Theravāda temples in Vietnam.

Other Southeast Asian nations, like Malaysia, Indonesia and Singapore, saw the introduction of Theravāda as a minority religion in the 20th century. Part of this was due to the immigration from Theravāda majority countries, but there were also missionary attempts to establish the religion among locals, such as the Buddhist Missionary Society Malaysia founded by Ven K. Sri Dhammananda. The oldest Theravāda temple in Singapore is the Thai Buddhist Wat Ananda Metyarama founded in 1918 by Venerable Luang Phor Hong Dhammaratano. The temple started a youth group named the Wat Ananda Youth (WAY) in 1966, which is the first registered Buddhist youth circle in Singapore.

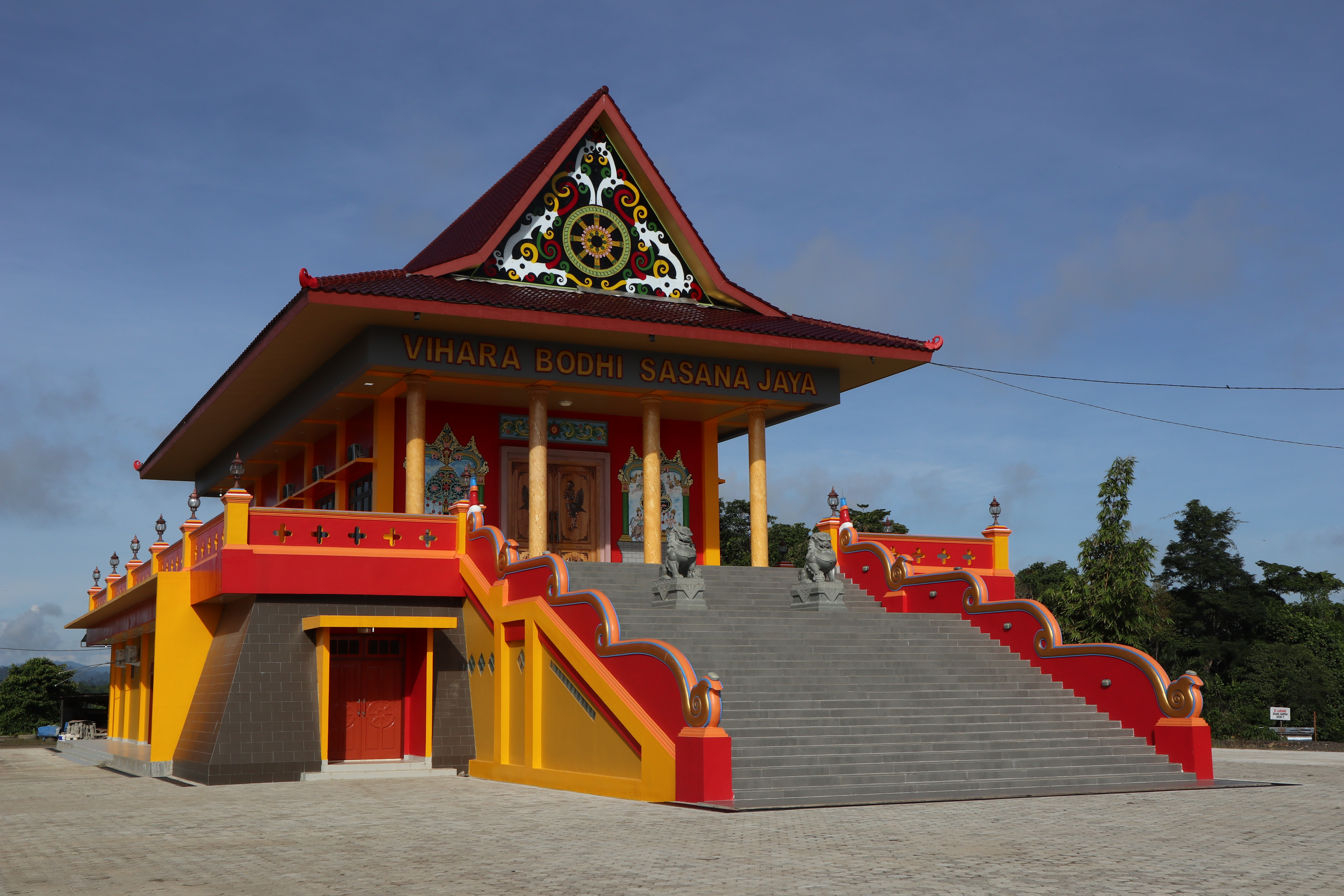
Vihara Bodhi Sasana Jaya, a temple of the Indonesian Theravāda Sangha in Malinau (built in 2014).

Indonesian Theravāda owes much to the early efforts of the Indonesian bhikkhu Ashin Jinarakkhita, who established the Fellowship of Laymen and Laywomen Indonesia and invited Thai monks of the Dhammayuttika Nikaya to the island in the 1960s. Narada Mahathera was also an influential figure in the Indonesian Buddhist revival. He visited Indonesia 15 times from 1934 to 1983 and brought Bodhi trees to be planted at Borobudur and Watu Gong Vihara (central Java). The first Theravāda organization was founded in 1976, it was called the Theravāda Sangha of Indonesia. They rejected the concept of "Sanghyang Adi Buddha" that was promoted by Jinarakkhita in order to bring Buddhism into line with the government policy of Pancasila (the first plank of this was belief in one god). Various Theravāda learning institutions have been founded since then.

=== Western world ===
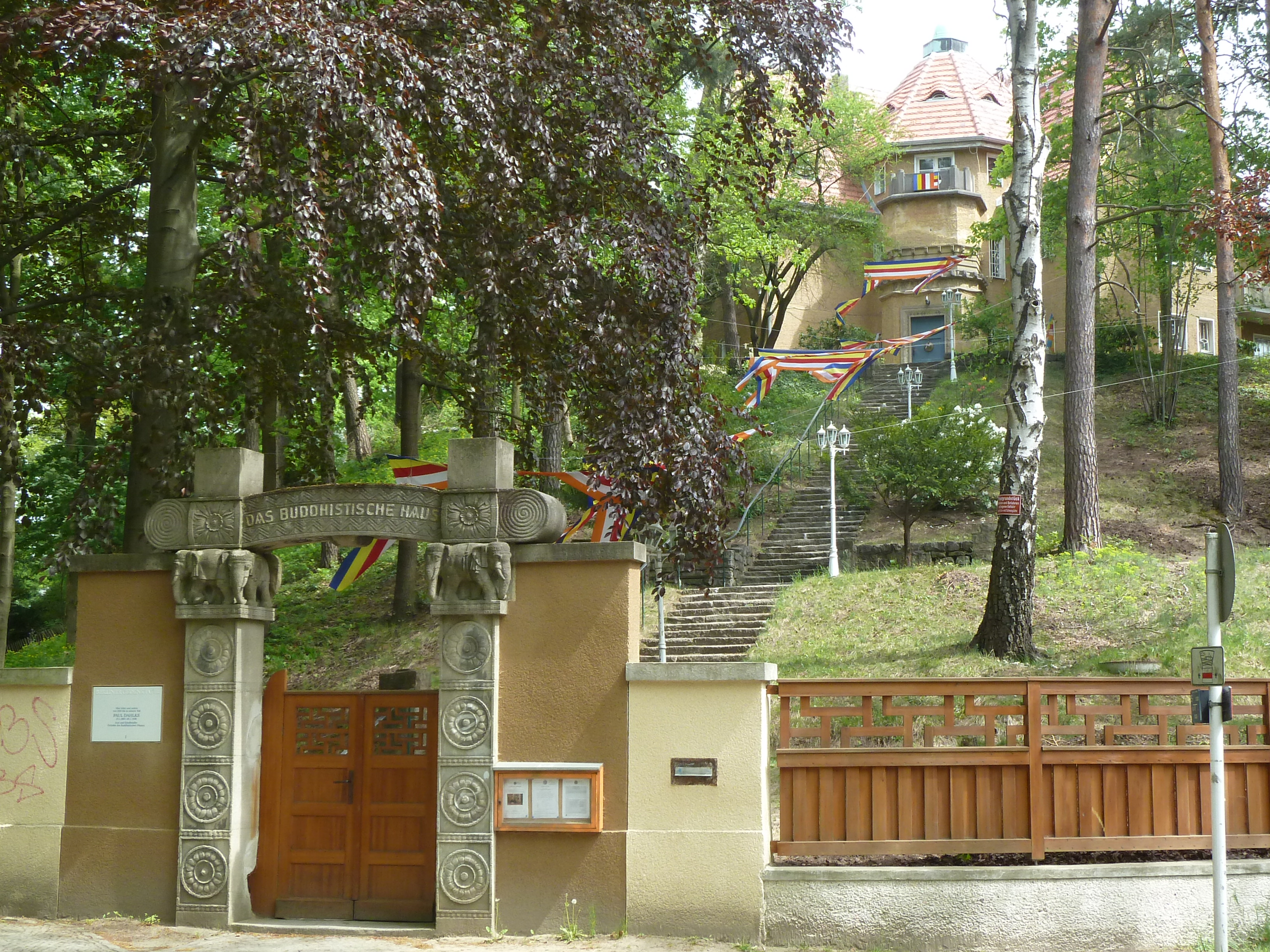
Das Buddhistische Haus (the Buddhist house) in Berlin is the oldest and largest Theravada Buddhist center in Europe.

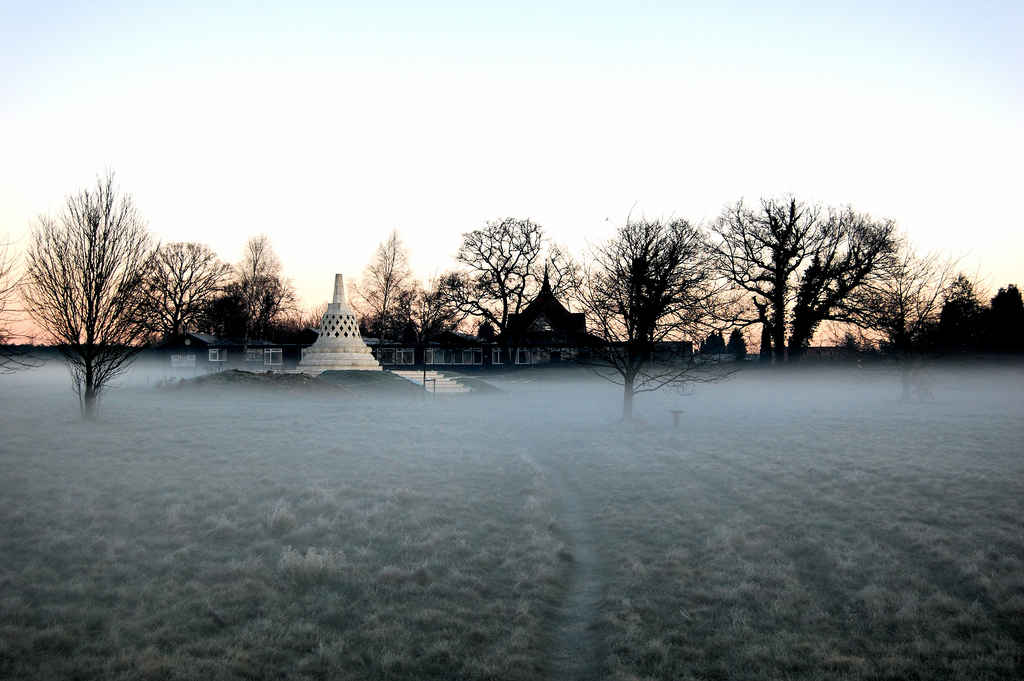
Amaravati Buddhist Monastery in England

In 1881, the Pali Text Society was founded by three English civil servants in Sri Lanka. The PTS publication of the Pāli Canon in latin script and their subsequent translation of it into English improved the availability of Theravāda scripture internationally. Sri Lankans like Anagarika Dharmapala and Asoka Weeraratna also established some of the first Theravāda centers in the west, like the London Buddhist Vihara (1926) and the Berlin Das Buddhistische Haus (1957).

Conversely, several influential western Buddhist monks lived and studied in Sri Lanka, including one of the first western bhikkhus, the German Nyanatiloka Mahathera and his students, Nanamoli Bhikkhu and Ven. Nyanaponika. These monks were responsible for many important translations into English and German.

In the 20th century, numerous westerners traveled to Thailand and ordained in the Thai Forest tradition under teachers like Ajahn Chah and Ajahn Lee. They then returned to the west, bringing the Thai forest tradition with them and founding various monasteries like Amaravati (England), Cittaviveka (England), Wat Metta (California, USA) and Abhayagiri (California). Some key figures of this movement include Ajahn Sumedho, Ajahn Viradhammo, Ajahn Amaro, Ajahn Brahm, Thanissaro Bhikkhu, and Ajahn Pasanno.

== See also ==
- History of Buddhism
- History of Buddhism in India
- History of the Thai Forest Tradition

== Bibliography ==
- Aung-Thwin, Michael A. (2019). Pagan: The Origins of Modern Burma. University of Hawaii Press.
- Bandaranayake, S.D. Sinhalese Monastic Architecture: The Viháras of Anurádhapura.
- Berkwitz, Stephen C. (2012). South Asian Buddhism: A Survey. Routledge.
- Bischoff, Roger (1995). Buddhism in Myanmar – A Short History. Kandy, Sri Lanka: Buddhist Publication Society.
- Carrithers, Michael (1973). The Forest Monks of Sri Lanka, An Anthropological and Historical Study. Oxford University Press.
- Cousins, Lance (1997). "Aspects of Southern Esoteric Buddhism". In Peter Connolly & Sue Hamilton (eds.). Indian Insights: Buddhism, Brahmanism and Bhakti: Papers from the Annual Spalding Symposium on Indian Religions. London: Luzac Oriental. ISBN 1-898942-15-3.
- Crosby, Kate (2013). Theravada Buddhism: Continuity, Diversity, and Identity. Wiley-Blackwell. ISBN 978-1-4051-8907-1.
- De Silva, K. M. (1981). A History of Sri Lanka. University of California Press.
- De Silva, K. M. (2005). A History of Sri Lanka (2nd ed.). India: Penguin Books. ISBN 978-0-14-400015-9.
- Evans, Grant (2002). A Short History of Laos: The Land in Between. Allen & Unwin.
- Gombrich, Richard F. (1988). Theravāda Buddhism. A Social History from Ancient Benares to Modern Colombo.
- Gombrich, Richard F. (1996). Theravāda Buddhism. A Social History from Ancient Benares to Modern Colombo. Routledge.
- Gombrich, Richard F. (2006). Theravada Buddhism, a social history from Ancient Benares to Modern Colombo (2nd ed.). Routledge.
- Harris, Ian (August 2001). "Buddhist Sangha Groupings in Cambodia". Buddhist Studies Review. 18 (I). UK Association for Buddhist Studies: 73–106. doi:10.1558/bsrv.v18i1.14469. ISSN 0265-2897. S2CID 247890925.
- Harris, Ian (2008). Cambodian Buddhism: History and Practice. University of Hawaii Press.
- Harvey, G.E. (1925). History of Burma: From the Earliest Times to 10 March 1824. London: Frank Cass & Co.
- Hirakawa, Akira (1993). Groner, Paul (ed.). A History of Indian Buddhism: From Śākyamuni to Early Mahāyāna. Translated by Groner, Paul. Motilal Banarsidass. ISBN 978-81-208-0955-0.
- Hirakawa, Akira (2007). Groner, Paul (ed.). A History of Indian Buddhism: From Śākyamuni to Early Mahāyāna. Translated by Groner, Paul.
- Htin Aung, Maung (1967). A History of Burma. New York and London: Cambridge University Press.
- Ishii, Yoneo (1986). Sangha, State, and Society: Thai Buddhism in History. University of Hawaii Press.
- Jermsawatdi, Promsak (1979). Thai Art with Indian Influences. Abhinav Publications.
- Jerryson, Michael K., ed. (2017). The Oxford Handbook of Contemporary Buddhism. Oxford University Press.
- Kalupahana, David J. (1994). A History of Buddhist Philosophy. Delhi: Motilal Banarsidass Publishers.
- Lehr, Peter (2019). Militant Buddhism: The Rise of Religious Violence in Sri Lanka, Myanmar and Thailand. Springer International Publishing Palgrave Macmillan.
- Leider, Jacques P. (2004). "Text, Lineage and Tradition in Burma. The Struggle for Norms and Religious Legitimacy Under King Bodawphaya (1782-1819)". The Journal of Burma Studies. 9: 82–129. doi:10.1353/jbs.2004.0000. S2CID 144200278.
- LeVine, Sarah; Gellner, David N. (2009). Rebuilding Buddhism: The Theravada Movement in Twentieth-Century Nepal. Harvard University Press.
- Lieberman, Victor B (2003). Strange Parallels: Southeast Asia in Global Context, c. 800–1830, Volume 1: Integration on the Mainland. Cambridge University Press. ISBN 978-0-521-80496-7.
- Lintner, Bertil (2009). The Resistance of the Monks: Buddhism and Activism in Burma. Human Rights Watch.
- Niharranjan Ray (1946). An Introduction to the Study of Theravada Buddhism in Burma: A Study in Indo-Burmese Historical and Cultural Relations from the Earliest Times to the British Conquest. Calcutta University Press.
- Mishra, Patit Paban (2010). The History of Thailand. Greenwood History of Modern Nations Series.
- Stuart-Fox, M. (1996). Buddhist Kingdom, Marxist State: The Making of Modern Laos. Bangkok: White Lotus Co.
- Sujato, Bhante (2012). Sects & Sectarianism: The Origins of Buddhist Schools. Santipada. ISBN 978-1-921842-08-5.
- Swearer, Donald K. (2012). The Buddhist World of Southeast Asia: Second Edition. SUNY Press.
- Tambiah, Stanley Jeyaraja (1992). Buddhism Betrayed?. The University of Chicago Press.
- Turner, Alicia Marie (2015). Saving Buddhism: The Impermanence of Religion in Colonial Burma. University of Hawai’i Press. ISBN 978-0-8248-3937-6.
- Warder, A.K. (2000). Indian Buddhism. Delhi: Motilal Banarsidass Publishers.
