= Abhidhammāvatāra =

- OpenTipitaka
- Type: Compendium text
- Parent: Pāli literature
- Compendium on: Abhidhamma Piṭaka
- Composition: 5th century Kaveri River Region, India
- Attribution: Buddhadatta

Abhidhammavatara (Pali, also Abhidhammāvatāra), according to Encyclopædia Britannica is "the earliest effort at systematizing, in the form of a manual, the doctrines dealt with in the Abhidhamma (scholastic) section of the Theravada Buddhist canon. According to Rupert Gethin, the Abhidhammāvatāra (‘Introduction to Abhidharma’) was "written in the fifth century by Buddhadatta, a contemporary of Buddhaghosa." Buddhadatta was a poet and scholar in the region of the Kaveri River, in southern India". He was patronised by Accutavikkante of the Kalamba family (Accut Accutavikkante Kalambakulanandane mahin samanusāsante āraddho ca samāpito-verse 3179 of Nigamanagātha, Vinayavinicchaya).

Buddhadatta used this work to sum up and give original systematization to other commentaries dealing with Abhidhamma. It is written in a chapter, verse format, with 24 chapters. The Abhidhammattha-sangaha has, in essence, superseded it.

== List of sections ==
1. Cittanidesa - Collection of stories about Mind 89/121 along with Lakkhanaticajatakka from Tipitaka and Atthakatha with explanations and reasons
2. Cetasikanidesa - Collection of stories about Cetasa 52 along with Lakkhanaticajatakka from Tipitaka and Atthakatha with explanations and reasons
3. Cetasikanidesa - Collection of stories about the ability to combine with each Mind-Cetasa of each Cetasa From the Tripitaka and the Commentary, it is presented with explanations and reasons. # Ekavithadinidesa - Collects methods of classifying the types of mind - mental factors into various categories from the Tripitaka and the Commentary, it is presented with explanations and reasons. # Bhumipukkacittauppattinidesa - Collects information about the operations, about the origins and developments of mind - mental factors - form in various realms from the Tripitaka and the Commentary, it is presented with explanations and reasons. To show that there is only mind mental factors - form, which are composed and cease in succession. It is like this, not an animal, no person, us, him, or self, no matter where it is.
4. Arammanavibhaganiddesa - Collects stories about emotions of mind - mental factors from Tipitaka and Atthakatha and shows with explanations and reasons.
5. Vipakacittapavattiniddesa - Collects stories about the operation, about the origin and occurrence of vipakacitta - vipakacitta from Tipitaka and Atthakatha and shows with explanations and reasons.
6. Pakinnakaniddesa - Collects stories about miscellanea, which are details, miscellaneous, and minor details from Tipitaka and Atthakatha and shows with explanations and reasons.
7. Punnavipakapaccayaniddesa - Collects stories about karma and the results of karma From the Tripitaka and the Commentary, it is presented with explanations and reasons.
8. Rupavibhakanidesa - Collects stories about Rūpa 28 along with Lakkhanaticcatukka, including methods of classifying types of form into various categories from the Tripitaka and the Commentary, it is presented with explanations and reasons.
9. Nibbananitdesa - Collects stories about Nirvana 1 along with Lakkhanaticcatukka, including explanations and reasons to correct misunderstandings, such as the misunderstanding that the cessation of defilements is Anupadisesanibbana. See: Nibbananitdeso - Abhidhammavatara-Sanghepathakatha (Buddhadatta) - Abhidhammavatara. Section 770 etc. from the Tripitaka and the Commentary, presented with explanations and reasons.
10. Panyattinidesa - Collects stories about precepts and divides precepts into different types from the Tripitaka and the Commentary, presented with explanations and reasons. Furthermore, in the commentary of this scripture, named Abhidhammatthavikasini, the three characteristics are organized into the Atthaprecepts of the Asamuhapanti.
11. Kakapattiwethanidesa - Collects stories about the misunderstanding that there are beings, persons, identities, us, them who are the doers, explains the principle of confirming that there are no beings, persons, etc. who are the doers of those things. From the Tripitaka and the Commentary, presented with explanations and reasons. # Rupavacarasamadhibhavananiddesa - Collection of stories about developing meditation at the level of Rupajhana (Jhana 1-5 according to Abhidhamma) from the Tripitaka and the Commentary, presented with explanations and reasons.
12. Arupavacarasamadhibhavananiddesa - Collects stories about developing meditation at the level of Arupajhana (Jhana 5-9 according to Abhidhamma) from Tipitaka and Atthakatha with explanations and reasons.
13. Abhiññāniddesa - Collects stories about practicing Abhiññā from Tipitaka and Atthakatha with explanations and reasons.
14. Abhiññārammananiddesa - Collects stories about Emotions that can be had of Pañcamajhana Kusala and Pañcamajhanakiriya that have obtained Abhiññā according to the type of Abhiññā that can be perceived from Tipitaka and Atthakatha with explanations and reasons.
15. Ditthivisuddhi Niddesa - Collects stories about practicing Parinya at the level of Namarupariccchedañāna From the Tripitaka and the Commentary, presented with explanations and reasons. # Kangkhavitaraṇavisuddhi Niddesa - Collection of stories about the practice of the paccayaparikkhanañāna From Tipitaka and Atthakatha presented with explanations and reasons
16. Maggamaggañānadassanavisuddhi Niddesa - Collected stories about the practice of Tīraṇa Parinya at the level of Udayappayana from Tipitaka and Atthakatha presented with explanations and reasons
17. Patipadañānadassanavisuddhi Niddesa - Collected stories about the practice of Paṇa Parinya at the level of Udayappayana and up to Anulomañā from Tipitaka and Atthakatha presented with explanations and reasons
18. Yanadassanavisuddhi Niddesa Yanadassanavisuddhi Niddesa - Collected stories about the moment of attaining the Path and Fruition From the Tripitaka and the Commentary, presented with explanations and reasons.
19. Janathatassanavisuddhi Niddesa Kilesapahanakatha - Collection of stories about defilements that are eliminated by the path mind, etc. From the Tripitaka and the Commentary, presented with explanations and reasons.
20. 'Paccayaniddesa Collection of stories about the 24 factors, which are the main reasons according to the topics in the Patthana Pakaratan in brief From the Tripitaka and the Commentary, presented with explanations and reasons.
