= Buddhadatta =

Theravada buddhist writer

Buddhadatta Thera was a 5th-century Theravada Buddhist writer from the town of Uragapura in the Chola kingdom of South India. He wrote many of his works in the Bhūtamangalagāma monastery and his patron was Accutavikkanta of the Kalamba dynasty (Kalambhakulavamsa jāte Accutavikkamanāme Colarājini Colarattham samanusāsante). Buddhadatta traveled to Sri Lanka's Mahāvihāra in Anurādhapura to study and translate the commentaries on the Buddha's teachings from Sinhalese to Pali. He is said to have met Buddhagosa at sea while returning to India, his work unfinished. Buddhadatta asked Buddhagosa to send him his translations and commentaries and used them in the writing of his Abhidhammāvatāra. Buddhadatta's other works include the Vinaya-Vinicchaya (“Analysis of the Vinaya”), the Uttara-Vinicchaya, the Rūpārūpa-Vibhāga

The Abhidhammāvatāra (Pali: “The Coming of the Abhidhamma”) is one of the earliest and most important Abhidhamma manuals. It is a systematized overview of the doctrines in the Abhidhamma Pitaka, written largely in 24 verse chapters. The Abhidhammattha-sangaha has, in essence, superseded it.

== Works ==
1. Uttaravinicchaya
2. Vinayavinicchaya - a Vinaya manual
3. Abhidhammavatara - an Abhidhamma manual
4. Ruparupavibhaga
5. Madhuratthavilasini - a commentary on the Buddhavamsa.
