= Buddhism in Nepal =

- Buddhist flag

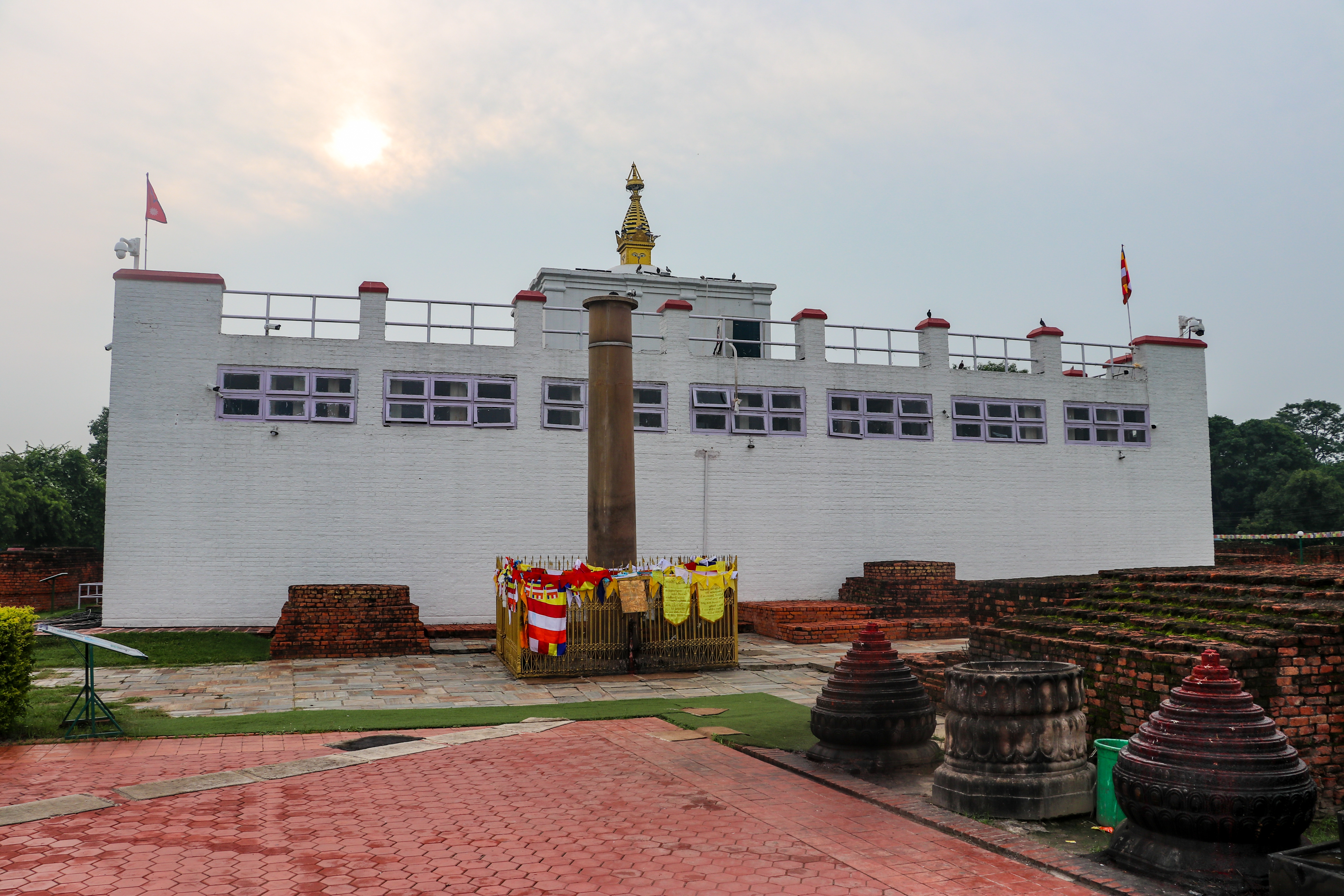
- Maya Devi Temple, Lumbini marking the Buddha's birthplace

Total population
- c. 2.4 million (8.2%) in 2021 census

Founder
- The Buddha

Regions with significant populations
- Throughout Nepal

Religions
- Buddhism

Languages
- Nepali and other languages

Buddhism in Nepal started spreading since the reign of Ashoka through Indian and Tibetan missionaries. The Kiratas were the first people in Nepal who embraced the Buddha's teachings, followed by the Licchavis and Newar people. Buddhism is Nepal's second-largest religion, with 8.2% of the country's population, or approximately 2.4 million people, identifying as adherents of Buddhism in the 2021 census. They are mainly of Tibeto-Burman speaking ethnicities and the Newar. Buddhism is currently experiencing a decline in Nepal with latest census showing 8.21% of Nepal's population professing Buddhism, a decline of 2.5% from 2001.

The Buddha was born in the Shakya Kingdom, which lied in present-day Rupandehi District in Lumbini. Besides Gautama Buddha, there are many Buddhas before him who are worshipped in different parts of Nepal. It has not been possible to assign the birth year of the Buddha with certainty; it is usually placed at around 563 BCE.

In Nepal's hill and mountain regions Hinduism has absorbed Buddhist tenets to such an extent that in many cases they have shared deities as well as temples. For instance, the Muktinath Temple is sacred and a common house of worship for both Hindus and Buddhists.

== Overview ==
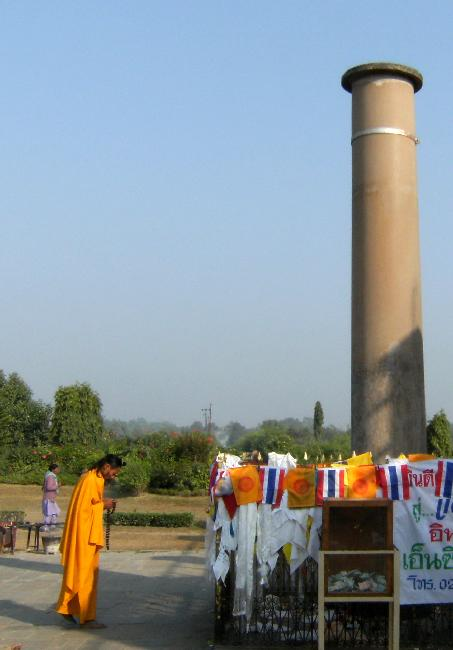
Birthplace of Siddhartha Gautama as Buddha, at Lumbini in Nepal

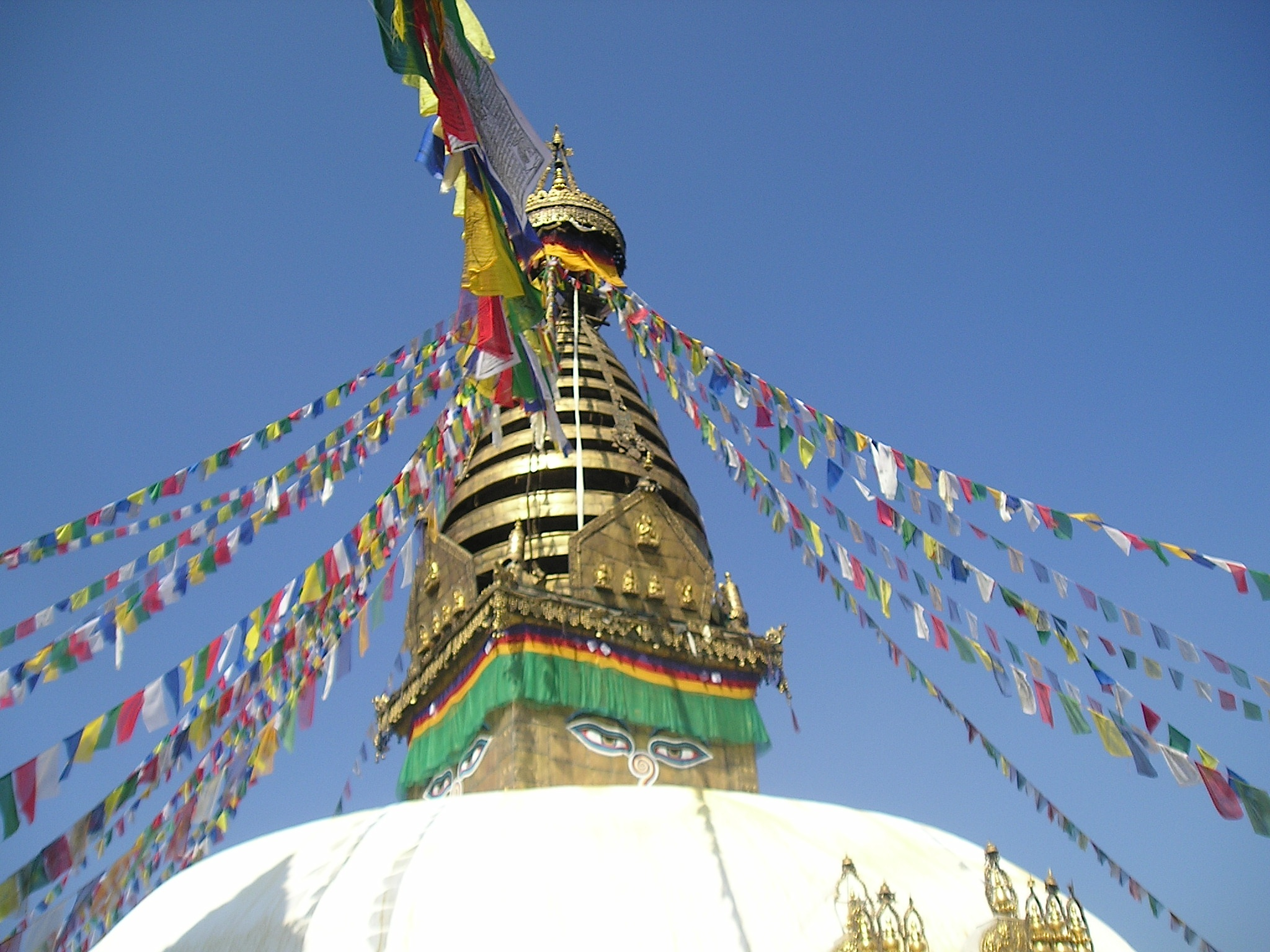
Swayambhu stupa and prayer flags

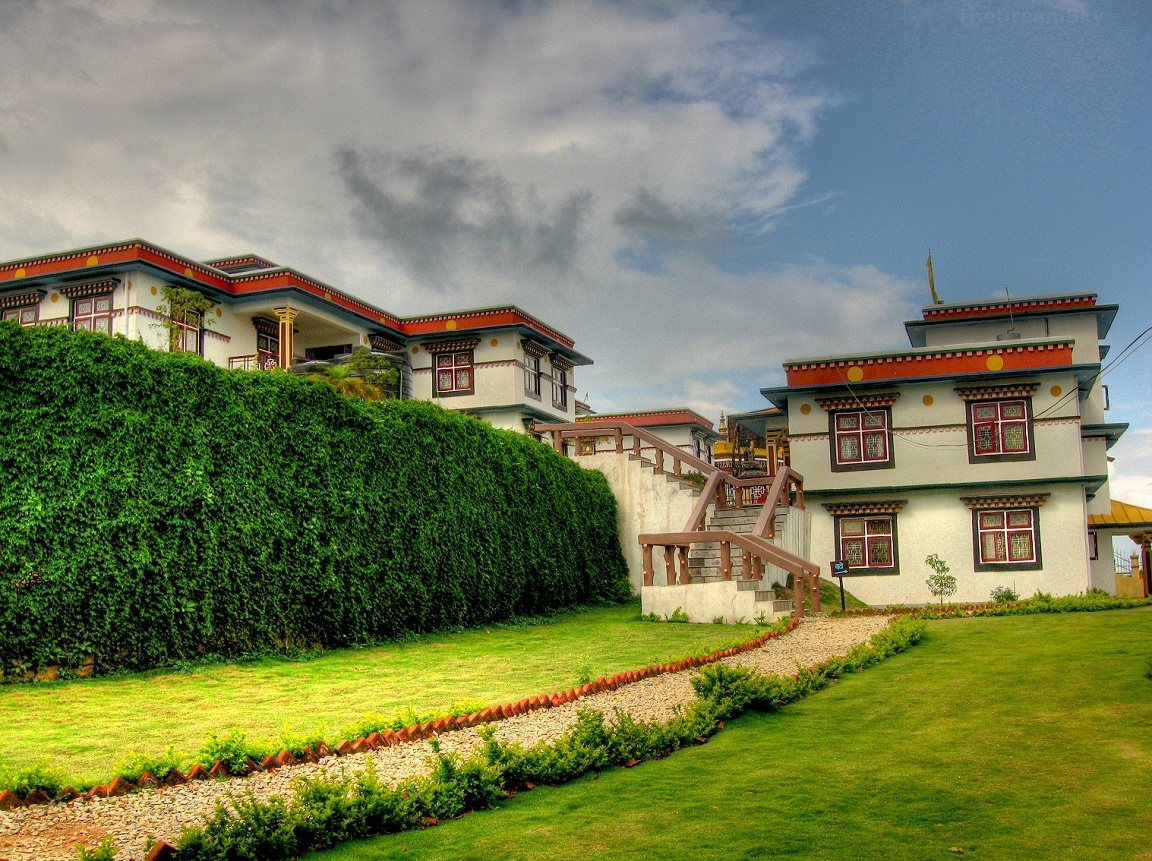
Amitabha Monastery in Nepal

In Nepal, the majority of people identify as Hindu. However, Buddhist influences are prevalent in most aspects of the culture of Nepal to an extent that Buddhist and Hindu temples are shared places of worship for peoples of both faiths so that, unlike in other countries, the distinction between Hinduism and Buddhism in Nepal is not always clear. During the reign of King Amshuverma, the Nepalese princess Bhrikuti played a significant role in spreading and developing Buddhism in Tibet. Tibetan Buddhist architecture has long been influenced by Nepalese artists and sculptors like Araniko. The sacred Buddhist texts in Mahayana Buddhism are mainly written in the Ranjana alphabet, the script of the Newars, or scripts like Lantsa, which are derived from Ranjana.

In traditional Nepalese Buddhism, there are nine special texts which are called the "Nine Dharma Jewels" (Navagrantha), and these are considered the nine books of Buddhism par excellence:

- Aṣṭasāhasrikā Prajñāpāramitā Sūtra
- Gaṇḍavyūha Sūtra
- Ten Stages Sutra
- Samādhirāja Sūtra
- Laṅkāvatāra Sūtra
- Lotus Sutra
- Tathāgataguhya Sūtra
- Lalitavistara Sūtra
- Golden Light Sutra

Among the Tibeto-Burman-speaking peoples, Tibetan Buddhism is the most widely practised form. Newar Buddhism is a form of Vajrayana influenced by Theravada Buddhism and is the oldest known form of the Vajrayana tradition and is significantly older than the Tibetan Buddhism. Many Buddhist groups are also influenced by Hinduism. Buddhism is the dominant religion of the thinly populated northern areas, which are inhabited by Tibetan-related peoples, namely the Sherpa, Lopa, Manangi, Thakali, Lhomi, Dolpa and Nyimba. They constitute a small minority of the country's population.

Ethnic groups that live in central Nepal such as the Gurungs, Lepcha, Tamang, Magar, Newars, Yakkha, Jirel, Thami, Chhantyal and Chepang are also Buddhist. These ethnic groups have larger populations compared to their northern neighbours. They came under the influence of Hinduism due to their close contacts with the Hindu castes. In turn, many of them eventually adopted Hinduism and have been largely integrated into the caste system.

The Kirati people, especially the Limbu and the Rai peoples, have also adopted Tibetan Buddhist practises from their Buddhist neighbours.

== History ==
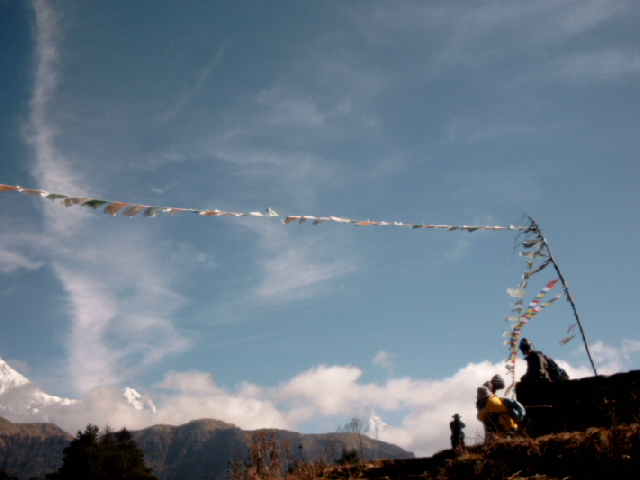
Buddhist prayer flags in Nepal

Nepalese Buddhist flag

Buddha was born as Prince Siddhartha in Nepal. He attained enlightenment under the Bodhi Tree in Bodh Gaya, in present-day Bihar, India. He there preached his teachings and thus Buddhism came into existence.

=== Pre-Lichchavi Buddhism ===
Emperor Ashoka of the Maurya Empire put up a pillar at Lumbini, the birthplace of the Buddha, in the second century BCE. After the Third Buddhist council, Ashoka sent missionaries to Nepal.

=== Buddhism during the Licchavi period (400-750 CE) ===
The Licchavi period saw the flourishing of both Hinduism and Buddhism in Nepal. Excellent examples of Buddhist art of the period are the half-sunken Buddha in Pashupatinath, the sleeping Vishnu in Budhanilkantha, and the statue of Buddha and the various representations of Vishnu in Changu Narayan.

Another Buddhist text, the Mañjuśrī-mūla-kalpa, mentioned Manadeva as the King of Nepal Mandala. Researchers believe the Mulasarvastivadavinaya was written in the 2nd century CE, and that the Manjushriulakalpa was written during Manadeva's reign. The Swayambhu Purana, the ancient Buddhist Purana text, and a Licchavi inscription all mentioned Nepal Mandala.

Buddhist inscriptions and chronicles and Tibetan sources also record a few tantric Buddhist deities, namely Akshobhya, Amitabha, Vajrayogini, Vajrabhairava, Usnisavijaya and Samantabhadra. Strong influence from pre-Buddhist beliefs resulted in belief in Buddhist deities such as the Pancaraksas.

Religious tolerance and syncretism were stressed during the Licchavi period. King Manadeva paid homage at both Hindu and Buddhist sites. His family subsequently found expression for their beliefs in various religions.

The worship of the Caitya and the Rath Jatra cart festival of Avalokitesvara were introduced around this period. Many ancient sites in the Kathmandu Valley were identified with major Buddhist Caityas, such as Swayambhunath, Boudhanath, Kathmandu and the four "Ashoka" stupas of Patan, and another two hundred stone Caityas dating from the Licchavi Period, were testified to the widespread antiquity of Caitya worship.

It is possible that this practice, in its earliest incarnation, was related to the worship of stones, which may have originated in the early, rival Kirata inhabitants of the Valley, prior to the Licchavis. According to one of the earliest Licchavi inscriptions, Caitya worship ordinarily consisted of ritual circumambulation of the caitya and offering standard items such as incense, colored powder, oil lamps and ablutions. At times, the inscriptions indicate, it could even involve resurfacing an existing Caitya and covering the new surface with many elaborate paintings.

Caitya worship was an important factor in bringing more of the proto-Newar tribal inhabitants into the Buddhist fold, as it was a devotional practice designed for the general public. Thus, the masses probably began practicing the cart festival of Avalokitesvara/Matsyendranath (Jana Baha Dyah Jatra and Bunga Dyah Jatra) during the latter half of the seventh century AD.

This festival was celebrated by hundreds or even thousands of people, who helped to construct and transport a huge, wheeled cart that bore the image of Avalokitesvara for several days or weeks along a specific route. The introduction of this festival must have been an instant success among the majority of the Kathmandu Valley population. This strengthened Buddhism's standing in relation to the other Hindu and Animist faiths of the Valley at the time.

Forty stone inscriptions made some mention of Buddhism throughout the Licchavi period. Most of the references are concerned with monasticism. However, almost nothing is known about the day-to-day life in the Vihara monasteries or how they functioned administratively.

The names of the fifteen Buddhist monasteries are known, and it is clear from the context in which some of these are named that they are among the most important religious sites of that time. It is not known for certain what schools of Buddhism were most prominent at the time. But the strongest early influences (aside from an even earlier probable substratum of Pali Buddhism) probably came from the Mahasanghika, Sammitiya and the Sarvastivada schools. The Makhyamaka and Yogacara schools were thought to be more influential in the later period with the emergence and growth of the Vajrayana school.

Inscriptional evidence also proves that there was a string of traditional methods of making religious gifts. These offerings were used for earning blessing and making merit, and women in the Buddhist community seem to have taken the lead in offering these gifts. Strikingly, parallel points within the Buddhist cave contain inscriptions of Maharashtra, which predated the Licchvi Nepal. The references in the Licchavi inscriptions to the Mahayana and Vajrayana will be mentioned below in connection with Buddhist art and notable Buddhist figures of the Licchavi period.

=== Buddhism during the Licchavi period (600-1200) ===
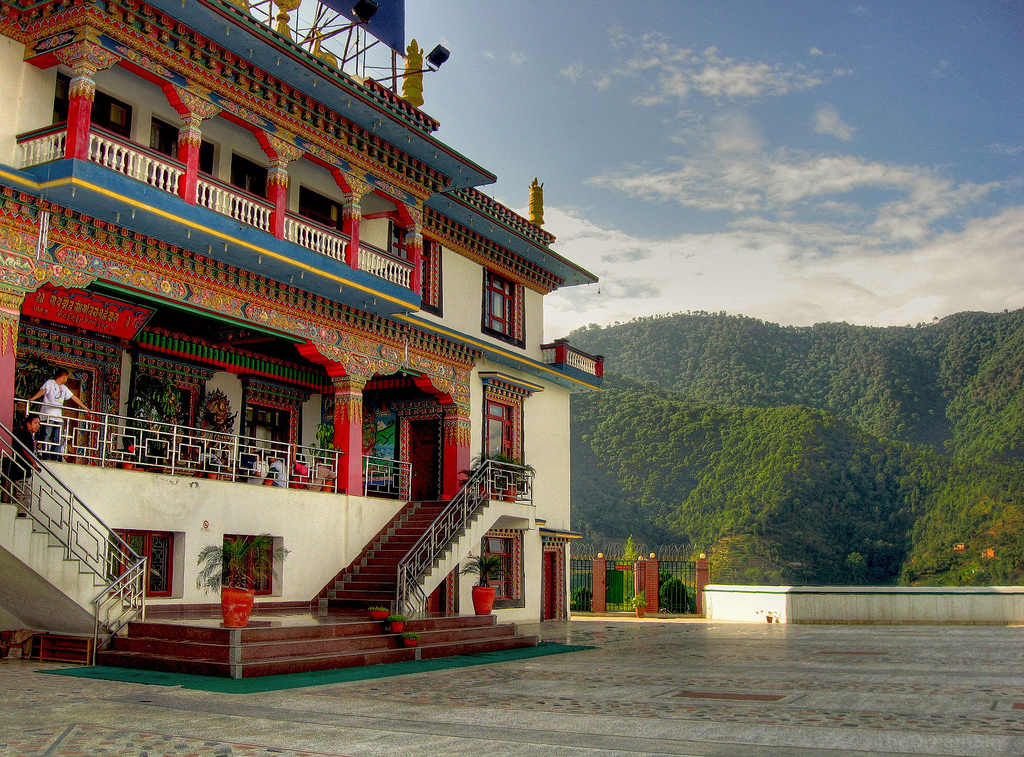
Amitabh Monastery in Nepal

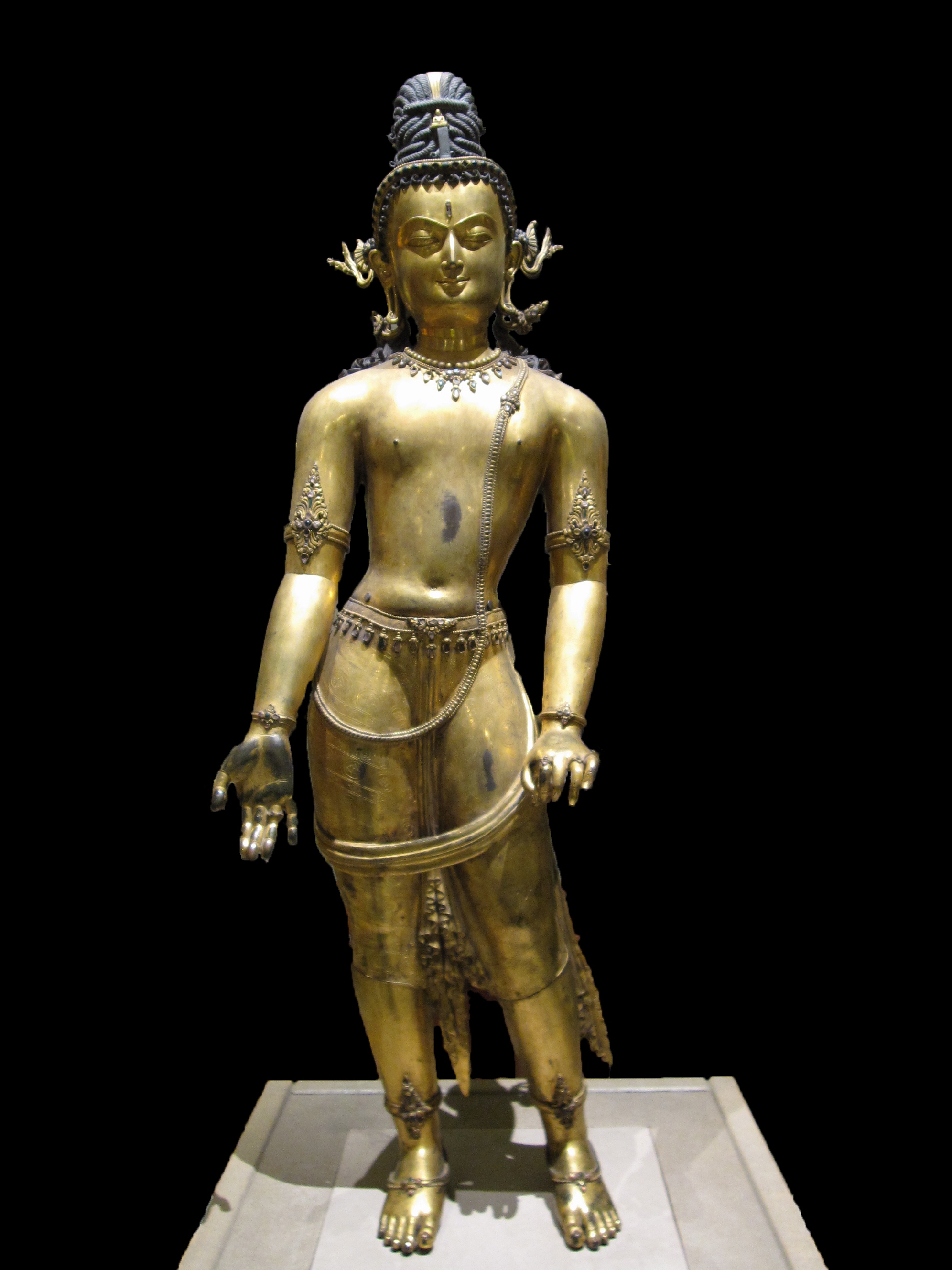
The Bodhisattva Avalokiteshvara, gilded bronze. Nepal, 16th century CE

=== Buddhism during the Malla dynasty (1200–1769) ===
The Malla dynasty saw to the golden period of the syncretism of Hindu and Buddhist art forms by the Newar. The Paubha, the Newar counterpart of the Tibetan Buddhist Thangka, flourished in this period.

During the reign of Jayasthiti Malla, after implementation of Manawa dharmasastra, celibate monks were banned from practicing in Nepal. This gave way to the decelibate Newar Buddhism. Because of this, Theravada Buddhism was lost in Nepal only to be revitalized in the beginning of the 20th century.

=== Buddhism during the Rana dynasty (1846–1951) ===
There is an incorrect assumption that, due to perceived similarity to tantric Hinduism, that Modern Newar Buddhism in Nepal has largely been absorbed into mainstream Hinduism. However, Newar Buddhism has retained a distinct identity, and nearly all practices, art forms and castes remain. In the north, people of Tibetan origin continued to be the much-unchanged practises of Tibetan Buddhism, especially in the case of the Nyimba of Northwest Nepal. On the other hand, the Thakali, who had traditionally played an important role in the Nepali society but yet retained Tibetan Buddhism, have begun to embrace Hinduism as well in the recent years.

It is significant to note that during the autocratic Rana regime, several Theravada Buddhists were banished from Nepal for preaching Buddhism. The Banishment of Buddhist monks from Nepal in 1926 and 1944 was prompted by an attempt to suppress the revival of Theravada Buddhism which began in the 1920s. In 1946, a Sri Lankan goodwill mission visited Kathmandu and interceded on behalf of the monks. The delegation emphasized that Nepal was the birthplace of Gautama Buddha, and that his followers should be free to practice their faith in the country where he was born. Subsequently, the ban was lifted and the monks returned and devoted themselves to spreading the faith with greater energy. Also, the rediscovery of Lumbini, the birthplace of Buddha, occurred in this era with contributions from among others, General Khadga Sumsher Rana.

=== Shah Dynasty (1951–2006) ===
After the overthrow of the Rana dynasty in 1951, Buddhism gradually developed in the country. Theravada Buddhists played a greatly significant role for the Buddhist revival campaign in modern Nepal since the 1920s. This revival movement has changed Buddhism from a religion of some ethnic groups and castes to going beyond the caste and ethnic religion in Nepal. Presently, there are three main Buddhist schools; Tibetan Buddhism, Newar Buddhism and Theravada Buddhism.

Tourism is an important factor for promoting Nepali Buddhism to the world. Every year, Kathmandu receives more than 10,000 travellers from all over the world just to visit the Boudha Boudhanath and the Swyambhu Maha Chaitya Swayambhunath stupas. These are remarkable and significant architectural sites, which are only found in Nepal. Apart from these two main monuments there are hundreds of Buddhist monuments in Kathmandu and in other cities of Nepal. Dr. B.R Ambedkar, Law Minister of India also visited Nepal and played a prominent role in maintaining diplomatic relations between India and Nepal on 14th November 1956. He was invited by the Nepal government and the Buddhist community led by Bhikkhu Amritananda Mahasthabir and others to attend the Fourth Conference of World Fellowships of Buddhists, conducted on 15-21 November, 1956. King Mahendra of Nepal was the chief guest in honor of Dr. Ambedkar. On 20th November, he delivered one of the last speeches of his life where he talked about Buddha or Karl Marx. In this speech, he mentions why if the younger generation of Buddhist countries do not appreciate teachings of Buddhism that are better than those of Communism, "Buddhism is doomed and cannot last beyond a generation or two."

=== Republic of Nepal (2006-present) ===
Nepal officially became a secular state in 2006. All religions in Nepal now have equal opportunities to propagate according to their belief.

== Demographics ==
According to the 2011 Census of Nepal, the adherents of Buddhism are as follows:

Ethnic Group	Buddhist Percentage 2001 (%)	Total Population 2011	Buddhist Percentage 2011 (%)	Total Buddhist 2011
Tamang	90.26%	1,539,830	87.29%	1,344,139
Magar	28.48%	1,887,733	18.04%	340,608
Gurung	69.03%	522,641	62.72%	327,813
Newar	15.35%	1,321,933	10.74%	141,982
Sherpa	92.83%	112,946	98.34%	111,068
Tharu	1.95%	1,737,470	3.27%	56,949
Bhote	59.40%	13,397	98.33%	13,173
Ghale	NEG (Note: NEG denotes newly listed ethnic group, for which 2001 census figures are not available.)	22,881	50.05%	11,451
Hyolmo	98.45%	10,752	91.32%	9,819
Thakali	65.01%	13,215	68.07%	8,995
Chhantyal	64.2%	11,810	0.00%	0
Jirel	87%	5,774	0.00%	0
Lepcha	88.8%	3,445	0.00%	0
Other ethnic groups	0.81%	19,290,677	0.15%	30,102
Total	10.74%	26,494,504	9.04%	2,396,099

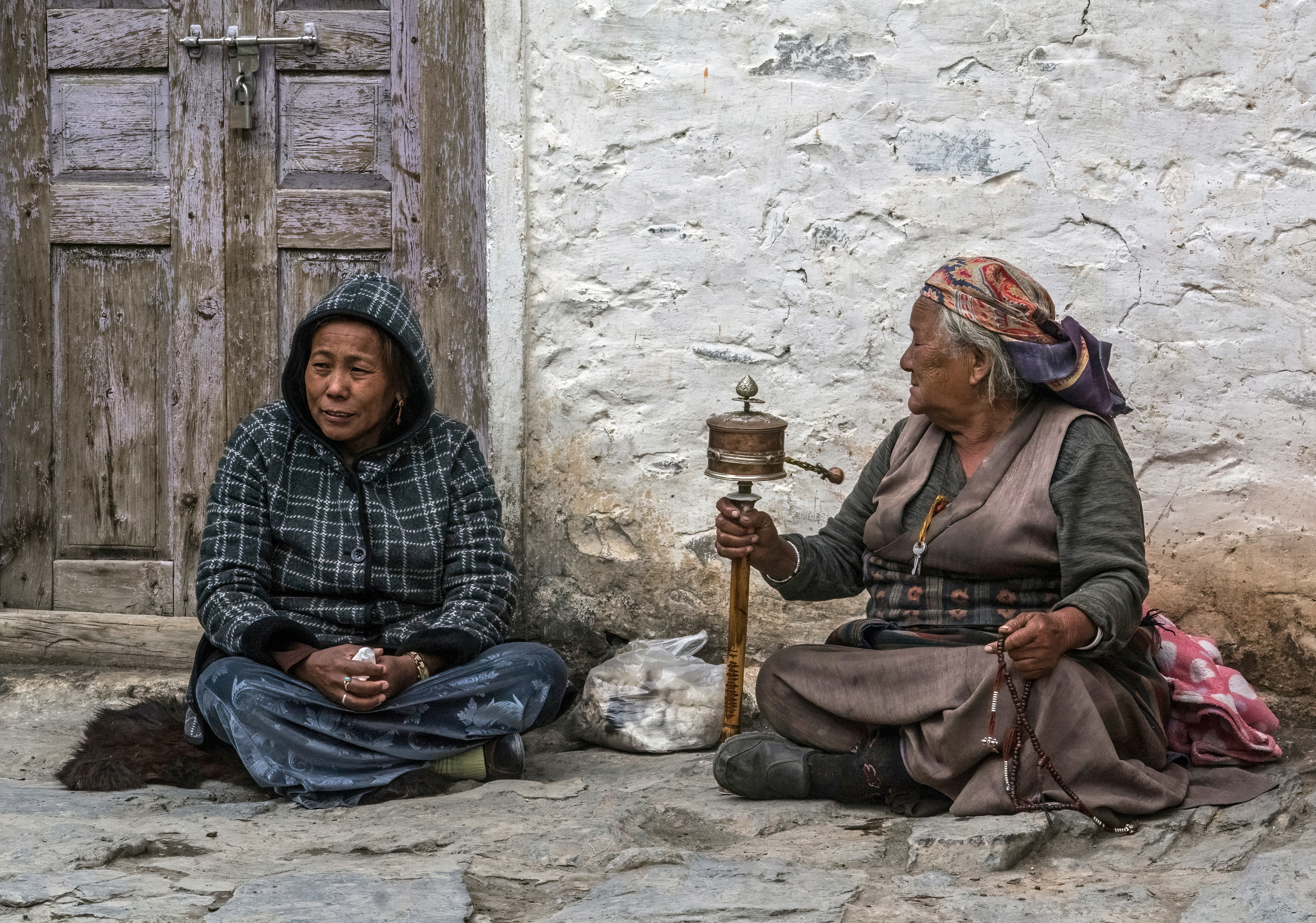
Praying women in Nepal

Between 2001 and 2011 census, the percentage of Buddhists have declined by 1.7%, from 10.74% to 9.04%. All major ethnic groups (except Sherpa, Bhote and Thakali) showed decline in percentage of Buddhists. It is interesting to note that in the 2011 census not a single Chhantyal, Jirel and Lepcha reported themselves as Buddhist. In the 2011 census, a total of 11,233 Chhantyal (95.1%) reported themselves as Hindu. Likewise, 4,604 Jirel (79.7%) and 2,907 Lepcha (84.4%) reported themselves as Bon religion followers. Of the Ghale group, which was added in the 2011 Census, more than 50% of them reported themselves as Buddhist followers.

Buddhism experiences further decline to 8.21% in its latest 2021 census, numbering around 2,394,549 followers (total 8.21%). This represents a decline of 0.79% from 2011's census and 2.5% from 2001's data.

== See also ==
- Religion in Nepal
- List of stupas in Nepal
- Newar Buddhism
  - List of Mahaviharas of Newar Buddhism
  - Buddha Dharma wa Nepal Bhasa (magazine)
- Dhammalok Mahasthavir
- Pragyananda Mahasthavir
- Kumar Kashyap Mahasthavir
- Aniruddha Mahathera
- Banishment of Buddhist monks from Nepal
- Dharmodaya
- Dharmaditya Dharmacharya
- Kindo Baha
- Pranidhipurna Mahavihar
- Buddhist pilgrimage sites in Nepal
- List of monasteries in Nepal
- Gurung shamanism
