= Pakhribas Municipality =

Pakhribas पाख्रिवास
- Municipality
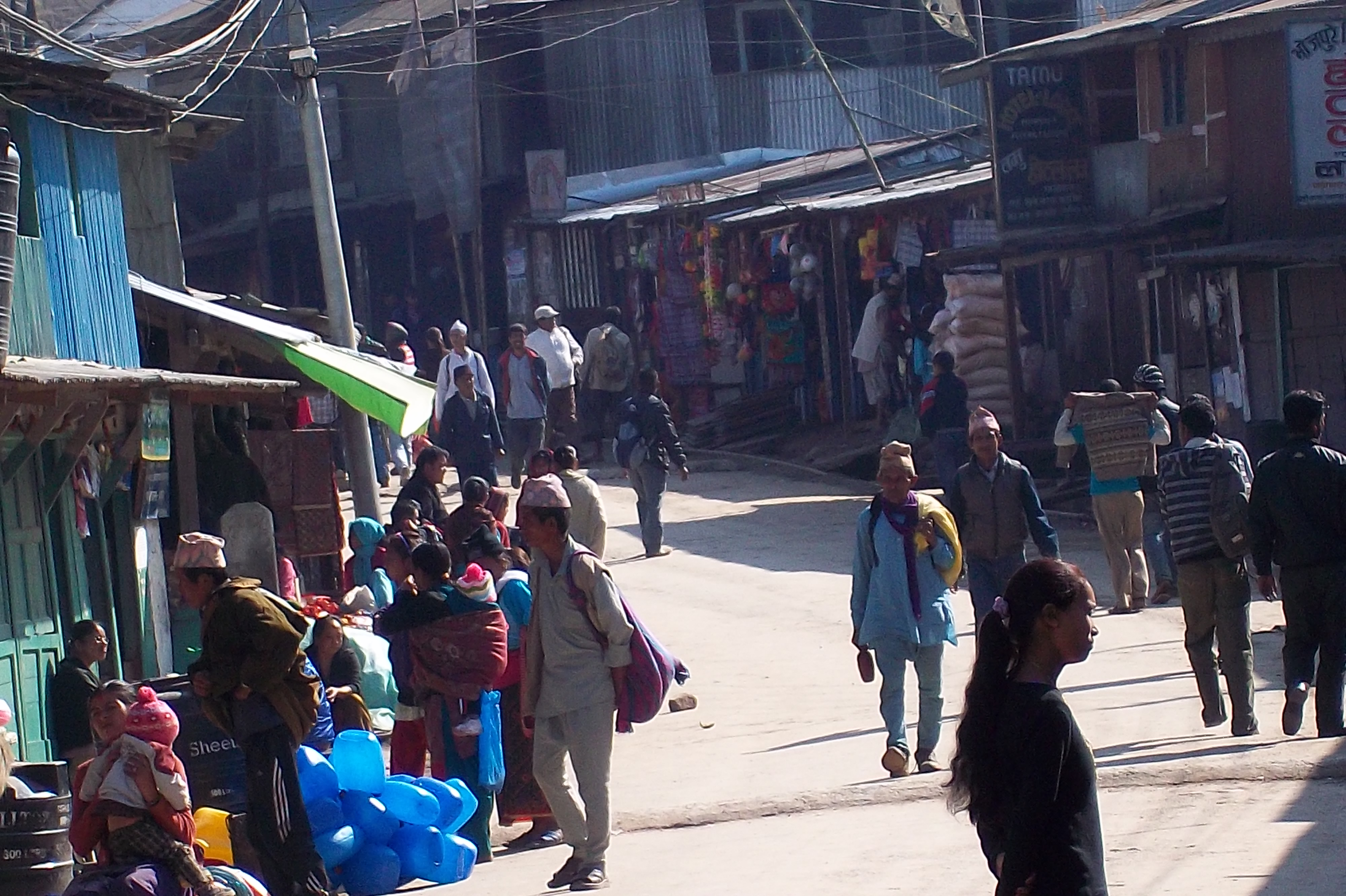
- Pakhribas Bazaar

- Location in Koshi Province Pakhribas (Nepal)
- Coordinates: 27.04°N 87.29°E
- Country: Nepal
- Province: Koshi
- District: Dhankuta
- Wards: 10
- Established: 2 December 2014

Government
  - Mayor: Mr. Gyan Bahadur Gurung (NC)
  - Deputy Mayor: Ms. Namrata Gautam (CPN (UML))

Population (2011)
  - Total: 22,078
- Time zone: UTC+5:45 (NST)
- Postal code: 56809
- Area code: 026
- Website: www.pakhribasmun.gov.np

Pakhribas (Nepali: पाख्रीबास नगरपालिका) is one of the three urban municipalities located in Dhankuta District of Province No. 1 in Nepal. The municipality was established on 2 December 2014 as a result of the merger of the VDCs of Pakhribas, namely Sanne, Phalate, Ghorlikharka and Muga.

When the Government of Nepal decided to reduce the local level body in 753 units, all previous VDCs nullified and merged with existing municipalities (some instead created new municipalities), so Chungmang VDC merged with Pakhribas on 10 March 2017.

The total area of the municipality is 144.29 square kilometres (55.71 sq mi) and the total population of the municipality is 22,078 as of the 2011 Nepal census. The municipality is divided into a total of 10 wards.

== History ==
Pakhribas was a village development committee in Dhankuta District in the Kosi Zone of the Eastern Development Region before 2014. At the time of the 1991 Nepal census, it had a population of 4508 people living in 890 individual households.

== Climate ==
Climate data for Pakhribas, elevation 1,680 m (5,510 ft), (1976–2005)
Month	Jan	Feb	Mar	Apr	May	Jun	Jul	Aug	Sep	Oct	Nov	Dec	Year
Mean daily maximum °C (°F)	14.4 (57.9)	16.3 (61.3)	20.5 (68.9)	23.8 (74.8)	24.1 (75.4)	24.0 (75.2)	23.3 (73.9)	23.5 (74.3)	23.0 (73.4)	21.7 (71.1)	19.1 (66.4)	15.9 (60.6)	20.8 (69.4)
Mean daily minimum °C (°F)	4.9 (40.8)	6.4 (43.5)	9.9 (49.8)	12.8 (55.0)	14.7 (58.5)	17.0 (62.6)	17.5 (63.5)	17.4 (63.3)	16.3 (61.3)	13.2 (55.8)	9.5 (49.1)	6.4 (43.5)	12.2 (53.9)
Average precipitation mm (inches)	14.9 (0.59)	14.5 (0.57)	25.8 (1.02)	61.0 (2.40)	150.1 (5.91)	261.7 (10.30)	398.1 (15.67)	344.0 (13.54)	194.7 (7.67)	63.4 (2.50)	12.9 (0.51)	12.9 (0.51)	1,559.8 (61.41)
Source: Agricultural Extension in South Asia

== Demographics ==
At the time of the 2011 Nepal census, Pakhribas Municipality had a population of 22,078. Of these, 53.8% spoke Nepali, 14.4% Tamang, 13.4% Magar, 8.8% Rai, 3.0% Bantawa, 1.3% Phangduwali, 0.9% Gurung, 0.7% Limbu, 0.7% Yakkha, 0.6% Newar, 0.5% Nachhiring, 0.4% Athpare, 0.4% Maithili, 0.2% Sherpa, 0.1% Bhujel, 0.1% Dungmali, 0.1% Hindi, 0.1% Sampang, 0.1% Sign language and 0.2% other languages as their first language.

In terms of ethnicity/caste, 27.2% were Chhetri, 16.4% Rai, 16.0% Tamang, 13.9% Magar, 5.8% Hill Brahmin, 4.7% Kami, 3.6% Newar, 2.4% Damai/Dholi, 2.0% Gharti/Bhujel, 2.0% Gurung, 1.9% Sarki, 1.6% Sanyasi/Dasnami, 0.7% Limbu, 0.4% Aathpariya, 0.3% Sherpa, 0.2% Yakkha, 0.1% Bantawa, 0.1% Dhunia, 0.1% Teli, 0.1% other Terai, 0.1% Yadav and 0.5% others.

In terms of religion, 59.8% were Hindu, 26.3% Buddhist, 12.8% Kirati, 1.0% Christian and 0.2% others.

In terms of literacy, 72.2% could read and write, 2.4% could only read and 25.4% could neither read nor write.

== Divisions ==
Pakhribas Municipality is divided into different formal VDCs.

No.	Type	Name
1	Formal VDC	Muga
2	Formal VDC	Pakhribas
3	Formal VDC	Chunwang
4	Formal VDC	Sanne
5	Formal VDC	Hathikharka
6	Formal VDC	Phalate
