= Sanne =

Sanne may refer to:

== Places ==
- Sanne, Germany, a village in Saxony-Anhalt, Germany
- Sanne, Nepal, a village in Nepal
- Sanne-Kerkuhn, another village in Saxony-Anhalt, Germany
- Salaise-sur-Sanne, commune on the Sanne river, Isère department, France

== Feminine given name ==
Sanne can be a short form of Susanne or a feminine form of the Frisian name Sane.

- Sanne Bjerg (born 1965), Danish opera librettist, director and novelist
- Sanne Cant (born 1990), Belgian racing cyclist
- Sanne Denotté (born 1973), Belgian Flemish singer
- Sanne van Dijke (born 1995), Dutch judoka
- Sanne Dijkstra-Downie, Scottish politician
- Sanne Hans (born 1984), Dutch singer-songwriter known as Miss Montreal
- Sanne Hoekstra (born 1992), Dutch handball player
- Sanne Karlsson (born 1985), Swedish singer-songwriter
- Sanne Keizer (born 1985), Dutch beach volleyball player
- Sanne Kurz (born 1974), German cinematographer
- Sanne Ledermann (1928–1943), Holocaust victim, friend of Anne Frank
- Sanne Lennström (born 1988), Swedish politician
- Sanne Troelsgaard Nielsen (born 1988), Danish footballer
- Sanne Nijhof (born 1987), Dutch model
- Sanne van Olphen (born 1989), Dutch handball player
- Sanne van Paassen (born 1988), Dutch cyclo-cross racing cyclist
- Sanne Putseys (born 1989), Belgian singer-songwriter known as Selah Sue
- Sanne Salomonsen (born 1955), Danish singer
- Sanne van der Star (born 1986), Dutch speed skater
- Sanne Verhagen (born 1992), Dutch judoka
- Sanne Vloet (born 1995), Dutch model
- Sanne Wevers (born 1991), Dutch gymnast, Olympic champion balance beam
- Sanne Wohlenberg, German-born television producer

== Surname ==
- Karl Sanne (1869–1945), Norwegian Minister of Education and Church Affairs
- Tom Sanne (born 1975), Norwegian footballer
- Werner Sanne (1889–1952), German General during World War II

== Other ==
- Sanne Group, a financial services business
