= Bjerg =

Bjerg is a Danish surname meaning mountain. Notable people with this surname include:

- Christian Flindt Bjerg, Danish football player
- Harald Bjerg Emborg (1920–1982), Danish composer
- Johannes Bjerg (1886–1955), Danish sculptor
- Marie Bjerg (born 1988), Danish football player
- Mikkel Bjerg (born 1998), Danish cyclist
- Rasmus Bjerg (born 1976), Danish actor, comedian and singer
- Sanne Bjerg (born 1965), Danish opera librettist, director and novelist
- Søren Bjerg (born 1996), real name of Bjergsen
- Svend Erik Bjerg (born 1944), Danish cyclist
- Tobias Bjerg (born 1998), Danish swimmer
