= Bhaju Ratna Kansakar =

Bhāju Ratna Kansakār
- भाजुरत्न कंसकार
- Born: 1882; Kathmandu, Nepal
- Died: 20 December 1956 (aged 74); Kathmandu
- Occupations: Trader, philanthropist
- Spouse: Gyan Maya Tamrakar (m. 1903; died 1918)
- Children: At least 4

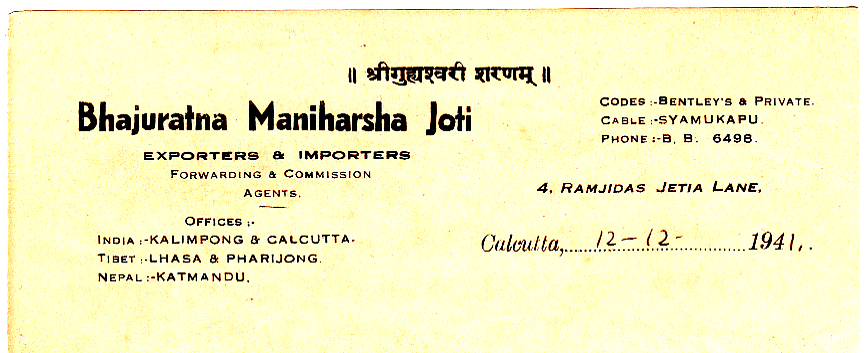
Letterhead of Bhaju Ratna's firm

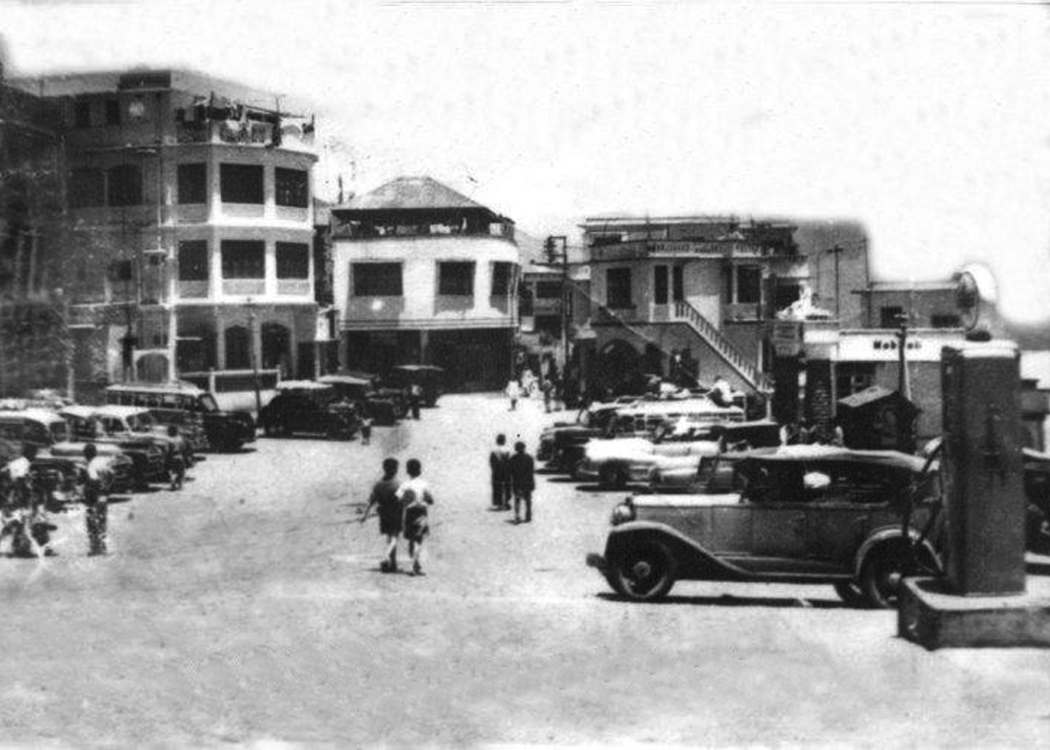
Motor Stand, Kalimpong in the 1950s

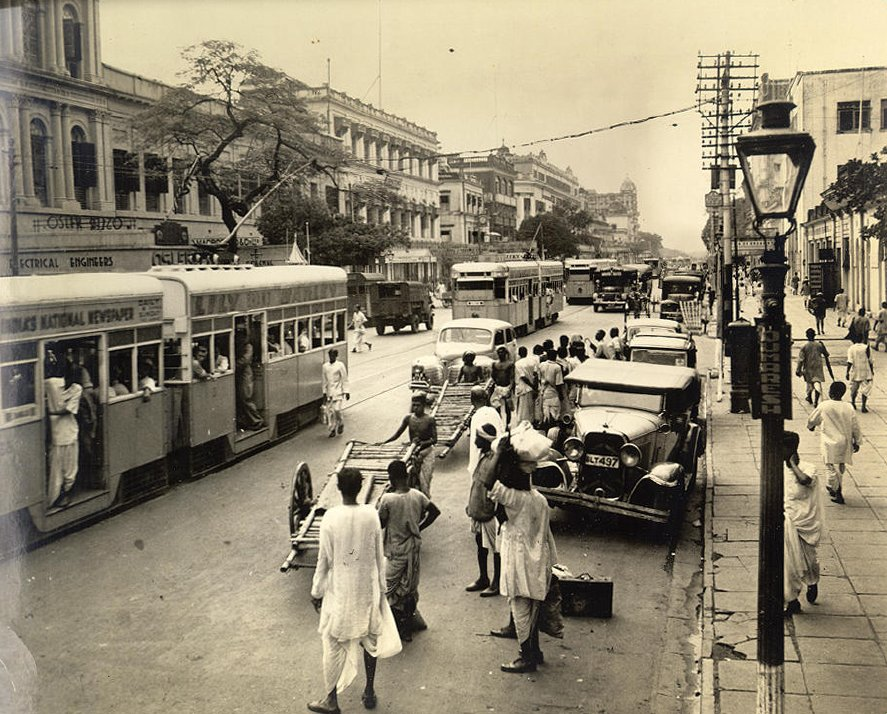
Kolkata in 1945

Bhāju Ratna Kansakār (Nepali: भाजुरत्न कंसकार) (1882 in – 20 December 1956) was a Nepalese trader and philanthropist who laid the foundations of the Jyoti Group, one of the largest business and industrial houses in Nepal. He was also an important figure in the revival of Theravada Buddhism in the country when it was being suppressed by the state.

== Biography ==
=== Early life ===
Bhaju Ratna was born in Kathmandu, the third of four sons of father Kulbir Singh and mother Nanibeti Kansakar. His ancestral home was located at Kel Tol, a business and ceremonial neighborhood in central Kathmandu. Its most important landmark is the temple of Jana Baha Dyah, which is known in Sanskrit as Aryavalokitesvara (Sacred Avalokiteśvara). Bhaju Ratna never went to school, and taught himself to read and write.

The Kansakars were engaged in the hereditary occupation of making bronze, brass and copper household utensils. Bhaju Ratna started out working at a relative's workshop in Darjeeling, India in 1898. Returning to Kathmandu in 1903, Bhaju Ratna married Gyan Maya Tamrakar. He went back to his job in Darjeeling shortly after.

=== Going into business ===
After a few years in Darjeeling, Bhaju Ratna decided to set up a cloth shop in Kathmandu with his savings, and went to Mumbai to procure stock. Around 1905, he opened a cloth shop at Kel Tol. The business prospered, but in 1918, a massive fire destroyed the entire stock of textiles and yarn, and Bhaju Ratna was ruined. About the same time, his wife died, leaving behind four children.

Bhaju Ratna remarried and moved to Kalimpong, India in 1921 to start afresh as a seller of household utensils for export to Tibet. Kalimpong was then the start of the caravan route to Lhasa. As business grew, he brought over craftsmen from Kathmandu and established his own workshop.

Bhaju Ratna habitually wore a white cap, and Tibetan traders would often refer to him as Syamukapu, which means "white cap" in Tibetan. It would become the name of the business house he subsequently established in Kalimpong and Tibet.

=== Enterprises in Tibet and India ===
Bhaju Ratna diversified into forwarding Lhasa-bound cargo for Lhasa Newar merchants based in the Tibetan capital. Later, he also procured the merchandise for them on commission basis, and dispatched them to Lhasa by mule caravan. By 1930, he had opened his own establishment in Tibet at Phari, which lies on the trade route to Lhasa.

Since most of the merchandise shipped to Lhasa were obtained in Kolkata, he set up an office there too in 1937, and sent his eldest son Maniharsha Jyoti Kansakar to work there. In 1939, he set up a business house in Lhasa.

Bhaju Ratna's extensive trading enterprises grew into the Jyoti Group which was founded in the 1940s by Maniharsha Jyoti (1917-1992). It is involved in trading, manufacturing, travel, steel, pharmaceuticals and insurance. Bhaju Ratna's grandson Roop Jyoti is the chairman of the Jyoti Group.

=== Religious benefactor ===
Bhaju Ratna became one of the most important supporters of the movement to revive Theravada Buddhism at a time when it faced official disapproval at great personal risk. In 1926, following the banishment of Buddhist monks from Nepal by the Rana regime, he took care of them when they arrived in Kalimpong. During the second expulsion in 1944 too, he housed and fed the monks for years. Bhaju Ratna's generosity earned him the name "hero of charity". He has also been featured in the course of study in Buddhism as an eminent lay person.

=== Death ===
Bhaju Ratna died at his home in Kathmandu aged 74.

== See also ==
- Lhasa Newar (trans-Himalayan traders)
