= Bauddha Rishi Mahapragya =

Nepalese monk

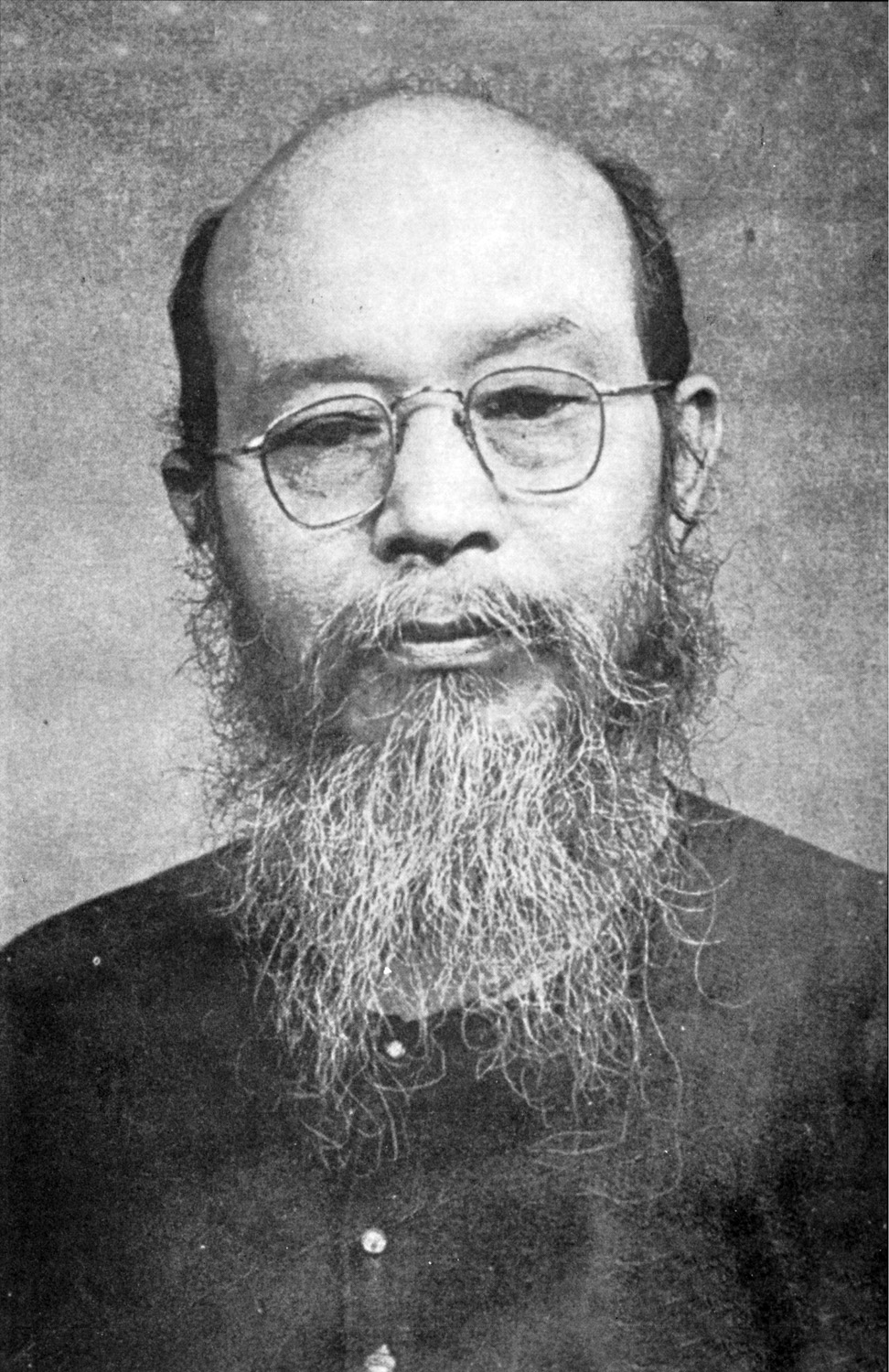
Bauddha Rishi Mahapragya

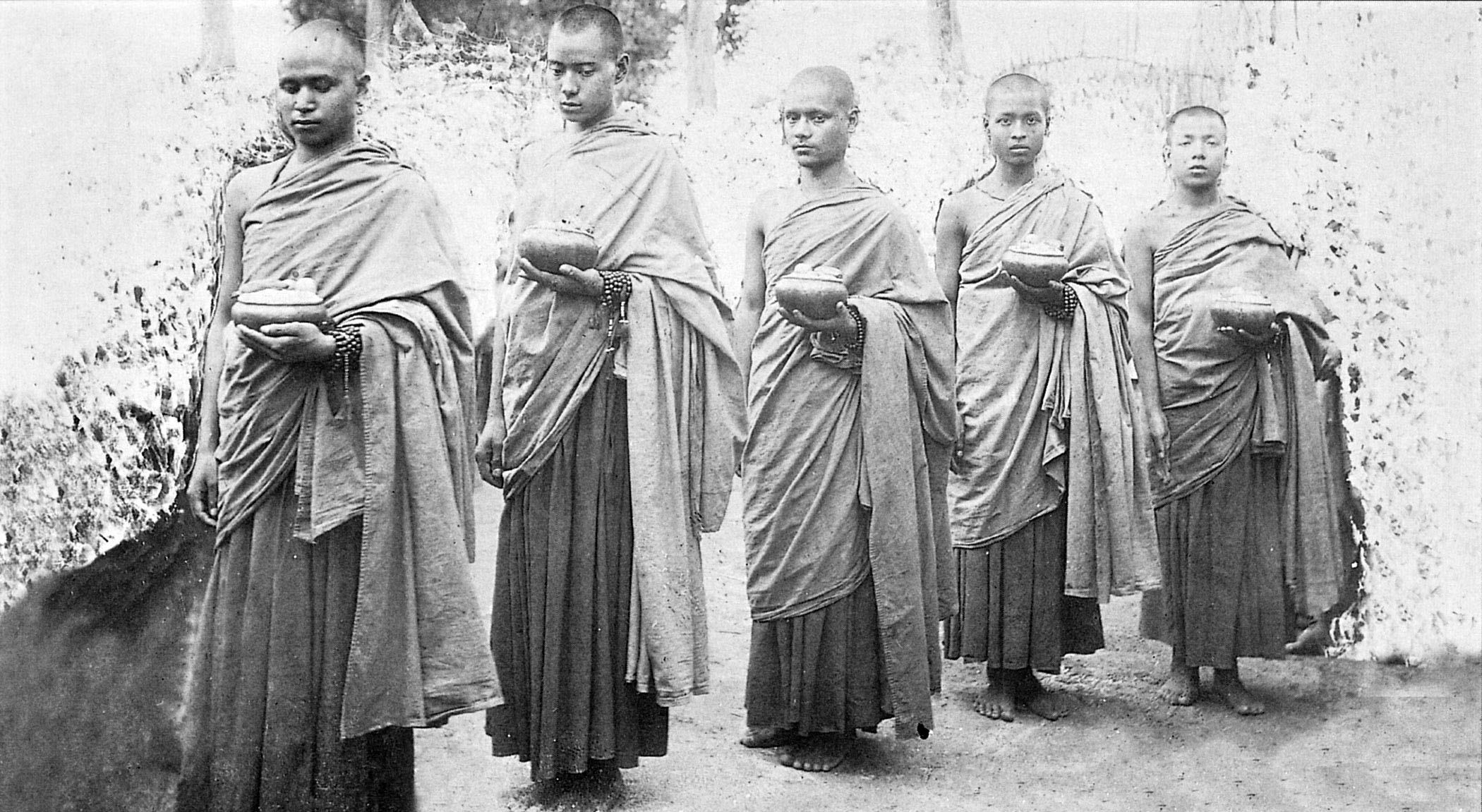
Mahapragya (left) and the other Buddhist monks exiled in 1926.

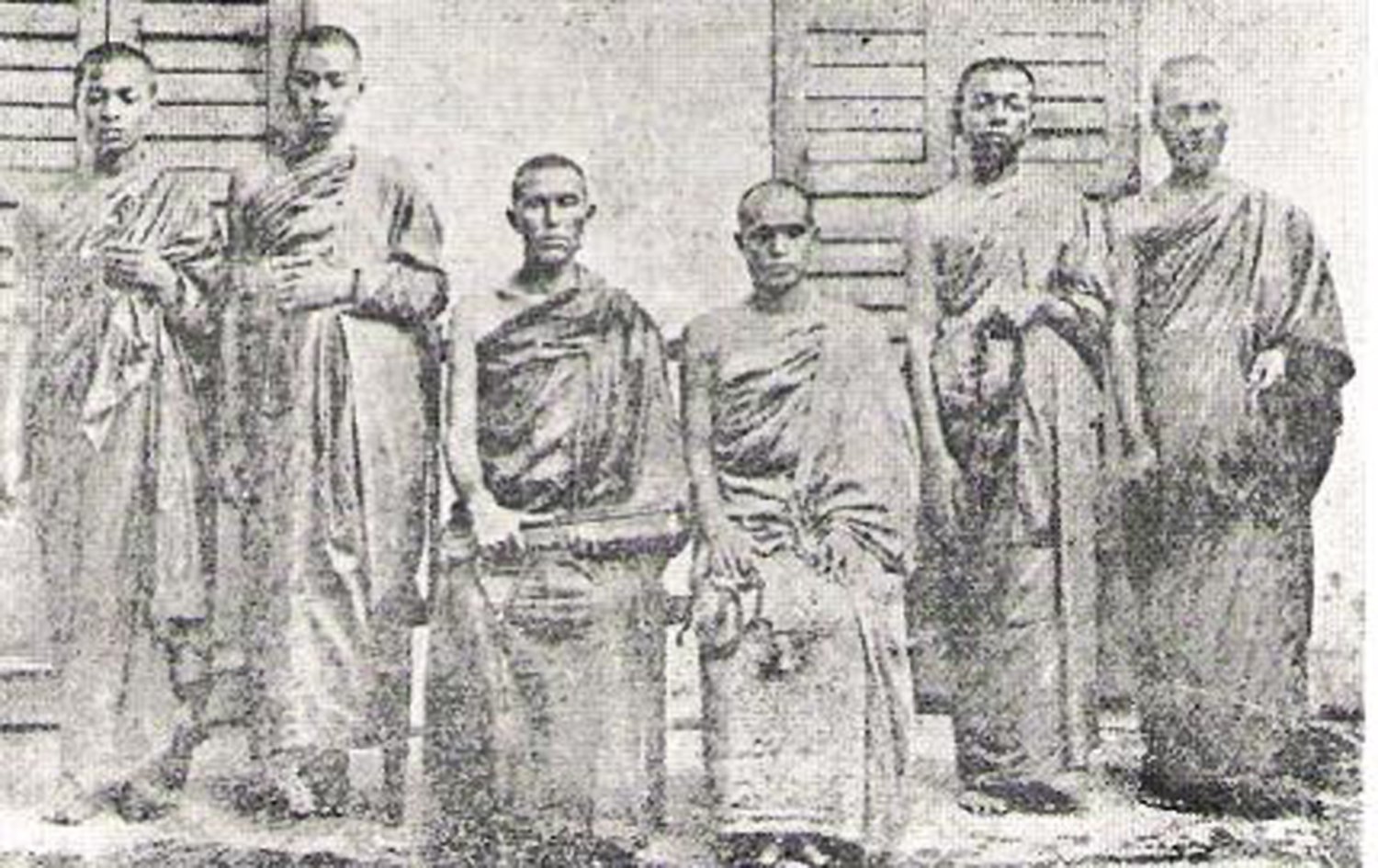
Expelled Buddhist monks Tsering Norbu (seated, left), Mahapragya (seated, right) and (standing, from left) Mahaviryya, Mahachandra, Mahakhanti and Mahagnana in Bodh Gaya, India in 1926.

Bauddha Rishi Mahapragya (Nepali: बौद्धऋषि महाप्रज्ञा; born Nani Kaji Shrestha; 21 May 1901 – 1979) was one of the most influential figures in the revival of Theravada Buddhism in Nepal in the 1920s. In 1926, he was jailed and then exiled by the tyrannical Rana regime for converting to Buddhism from Hinduism.

Mahapragya (alternative names: Bhikshu Mahapragya, Palden Sherab, M. P. Pradhan, Prem Bahadur Shrestha) was also a writer and is known for his Buddhist books, poetry and hymns in Nepal Bhasa and Hindi.

== Early life ==
Mahapragya was born at Lhugah (ल्हूघ:) in Kathmandu to father Kul Narayan and mother Hira Maya Shrestha. He was named Prem Bahadur Shrestha. As a youth, he was inclined towards composing and singing hymns. He had an early marriage which broke up.

== Ordination ==
In 1924, inspired by the sermons of Tibetan Buddhist monk Kyangtse Lama who was then visiting Kathmandu, Prem Bahadur followed him to Kyirong, Tibet where he was ordained as a Tibetan monk along with two other Newars. He was given the name Mahapragya. He returned to Kathmandu with one of the novices, and they lived on Nagarjuna hill with a lama named Tsering Norbu. Three of Mahapragya's friends joined them and also became monks.

== Into exile ==
The people of Kathmandu were inspired by the sight of the men in ochre robes as they made their alms round. The Ranas did not like Mahapragya, born a Hindu, becoming a Tibetan Buddhist monk, or the monks going around the city begging. In 1926, the five monks and Tsering Norbu were expelled to India. The six went to Bodh Gaya where they became Theravada monks under a Burmese teacher. They then moved to Kolkata, and Mahapragya decided to travel to Tibet with Tsering Norbu to learn Buddhism.

In Lhasa, Mahapragya met Kul Man Singh Tuladhar whom he convinced to become a Tibetan monk. Mahapragya and Kul Man Singh, now known as Karmasheel, wandered around Tibet and then went to Kushinagar, India in 1928 where they were reordained as Theravada monks. Karmasheel (who would later become known as Pragyananda Mahasthavir) returned to Kathmandu in 1930 as the first Theravada monk in Nepal since the 14th century.

But Mahapragya, still under an expulsion order, could not enter the country. However, in March 1930 during the Maha Shivaratri festival, he slipped into Kathmandu disguised as a woman and blending with the throngs of Indian pilgrims. He returned to Kushinagar shortly for fear of detection. He then traveled to Burma where he lived in the jungle and varied monasteries before moving to Kalimpong, India in 1934.

== Buddhist sage ==
Mahapragya lived in Kalimpong as he waited to be allowed to return to Nepal. In 1945, he disrobed and became a layman to marry a widow with whom he had two children. He worked as a photographer, and also taught Buddhism. In 1962, he broke up with her and lived in Kathmandu as a Buddhist sage (Bauddha Rishi).

Mahapragya has published 18 books which include his most famous work Lalitavistara, the Buddha's life story first published in 1940, and his autobiography in three volumes (1983). The hymn "The Light of Wisdom has Died" is among the most popular of his compositions.

== See also ==
- Banishment of Buddhist monks from Nepal
