= Pranidhipurna Mahavihar =

Theravadin Buddhist monastery in Nepal

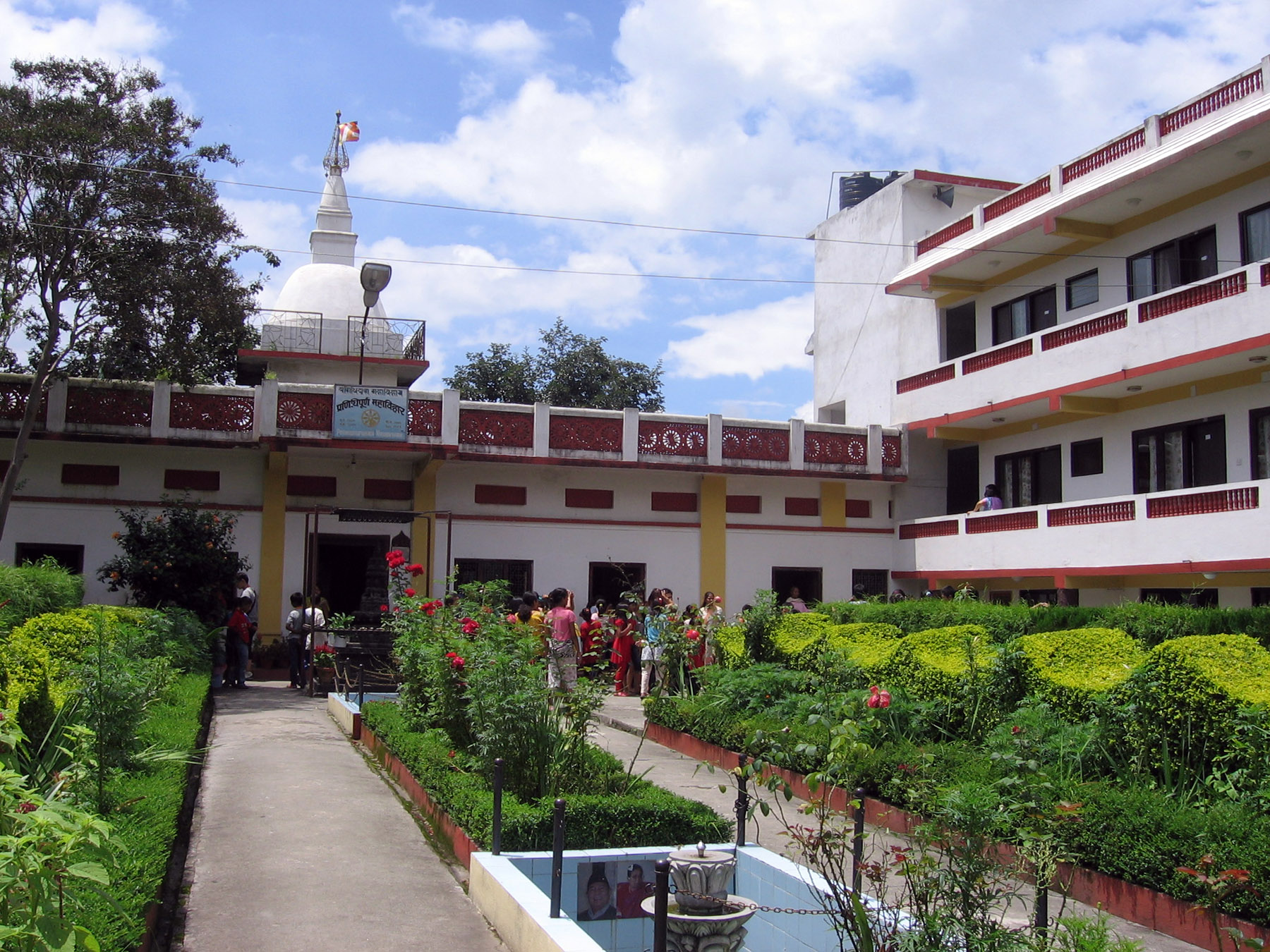

Religion
- Affiliation: Theravada Buddhism

Location
- Location: Balambu
- Country: Nepal

Architecture
- Founder: Pragyananda Mahasthavir
- Completed: 1942

Website
- Official Website

Pranidhipurna Mahavihar (Nepali: प्रणिधिपूर्ण महाविहार) is a Theravada Buddhist monastery in Balambu, Kathmandu which was a key base in the revival of Theravada Buddhism in Nepal in the 1940s.

Informally known as Balambu Bihar, it is located 8 km from Kathmandu at the western edge of the Kathmandu Valley.

== History ==
The history of the Mahavihar dates from 1942 when Buddhist monk Pragyananda Mahasthavir came here and began revealing the teachings of the Buddha from a roadside shed. He was the first yellow-robed monk to be seen in Kathmandu since the 14th century. The growing activities in Theravada Buddhism, which was making a comeback in the country, aroused the anger of the government which was intolerant of the religion. Official moves to suppress its spread made the followers more defiant and spurred the development of the monastery.

In 1944, the autocratic Rana regime mounted a crackdown against Buddhist monks for teaching Buddhism and writing religious book in Nepal Bhasa. Eight monks including Pragyananda were expelled for refusing to stop their activities. Following the banishment of Buddhist monks from Nepal, the local people hid a number of other monks in nearby Balambu village to save them from being deported.

In 1946, the exiled monks who had scattered to India, Tibet, Bhutan and Sri Lanka were allowed to return to Nepal due to international pressure. Even then the government kept a close watch on them, so they decided to live outside the city far from the eyes of the police where they would not be disturbed. Balambu thus became a stronghold in the revival of Theravada Buddhism in Nepal.

Construction of the monastery building began in 1947 with funds contributed by the locals. Its founder Pragyananda went on to become the first Sangha Mahanayaka (Patriarch) of Nepal in modern times.

== Activities ==
Balambu Bihar contains a number of resident monks and nuns and is headed by an abbot. It is an important center of Buddhist study especially for youths. Besides conducting religious services, the vihara holds retreats, Dhamma classes and free health camps. It also organizes life cycle ceremonies for boys and girls and operates a senior citizens' home.
