= Dhammalok Mahasthavir =

Pioneer Theravadin Buddhist monk in Nepal

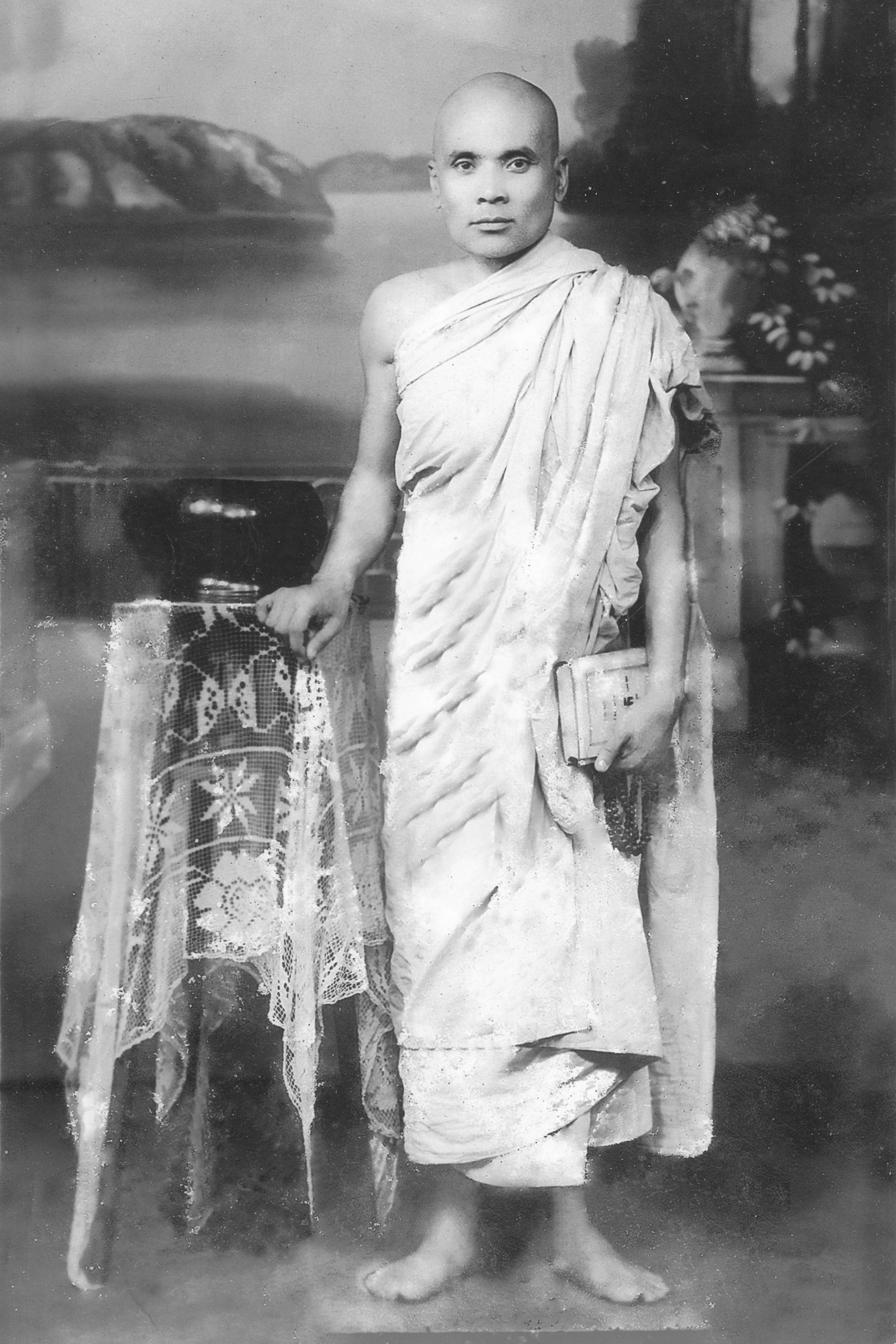

Personal life
- Born: Das Ratna; 16 January 1890 Asan Dhalasikwa, Kathmandu, Nepal
- Died: 17 October 1966 (aged 76) Ananda Kuti Vihar, Swayambhunath, Kathmandu, Nepal
- Other names: Bhikkhu Dhammalok Mahathero, Dharmaloka
- Occupation: Buddhist monk

Religious life
- Religion: Buddhism
- School: Theravada

Dhammalok Mahasthavir (Nepali: धम्मालोक महास्थविर) (born Das Ratna Tuladhar) (16 January 1890 – 17 October 1966) was a Nepalese Buddhist monk who worked to revive Theravada Buddhism in Nepal in the 1930s and 1940s. For this act, he was expelled from the country by the tyrannical Rana regime.

Dhammalok was also a writer who contributed to the Nepal Bhasa renaissance. He worked to promote Theravada Buddhism and Nepal Bhasa braving government persecution.

== Early life ==
Dhammalok (alternative names: Bhikkhu Dhammalok Mahathero, Dharmaloka) was born Das Ratna Tuladhar at Asan Dhalasikwa, Kathmandu to a trading family. His father was Kesh Sundar and his mother Bekha Laxmi Tuladhar. Das Ratna engaged in business in Tibet during his early years and was known by the nickname Baran Sahu (बारां साहु).

He was married to Dibya Laxmi with whom he had two sons and a daughter. Grief at the death of his wife and his association with Mahapandit Rahul Sankrityayan of India drew him towards religion. His elder son Gaja Ratna too became a Buddhist monk, taking up the name Aniruddha Mahathera.

== Imprisonment and ordination ==
In 1929, Das Ratna went to Sri Lanka for religious study. Returning to Nepal, he lived at the monastery of Kindo Baha near Swayambhu where he conducted regular prayer meetings and distributed pamphlets written in Nepal Bhasa appealing for donations. On 6 November 1931, he was arrested and imprisoned for seven days as it was illegal to write in Nepal Bhasa or propagate Buddhism. Subsequently, Das Ratna went to Rangoon, Burma (now Yangon, Myanmar) where he lived a year. Returning from Burma, he went to Kusinagar where he became a novice monk and took the name Dhammalok in 1933.

Dhammalok returned to Kindo Baha, where he began writing a series of books in Nepal Bhasa that challenged traditional thinking. Lokay Kuchal Kubyabahar Sudhar ("Reforming Ill Practices and Customs in Society") and Dharmaya Namay Pap ("Sinning in the Name of Religion") published from Varanasi, India are some of his well-known works. Dhammalok has also translated Buddha Charita, a biography of the Buddha by Asva Ghosh, into Nepal Bhasa from the Sanskrit. Among his notable books, the travelogue Mahachin Yatra ("A Journey to Great China") was published from Kalimpong in 1950. Dhammalok received higher ordination in Sarnath in 1935.

== Into exile ==
In 1943, Dhammalok established Ananda Kuti Vihar, the first Theravada monastery in modern Nepal, at Swayambhu. It became the center for the Theravada community.

The government declared that the activities of the Theravada monks of spreading Buddhism and writing in Nepal Bhasa were illegal, and on 30 July 1944, eight monks including Dhammalok, Pragyananda Mahasthavir and Kumar Kashyap Mahasthavir were expelled from Nepal for refusing to sign a pledge to stop doing so. The exiled monks first went to Kushinagar, India and then to Sarnath. On the full moon day of 31 November 1944 in Sarnath, they founded Dharmodaya Sabha (Society for the Rise of the Teaching) which published books and a magazine on Buddhism titled Dharmodaya.

Dhammalok spent his exile in India, Tibet and Bhutan, and returned to Kathmandu on 5 June 1946 after the ban was lifted. From 1946, following pressure from Indian Buddhist societies, the government also allowed publication of literature in Nepal Bhasa after being censored. Dhammalok devoted his later years to writing. He also worked to develop Lumbini and Kapilavastu, the Buddha's birthplace and family home in southern Nepal. Dhammalok died at Ananda Kuti Vihar.

== Gallery ==
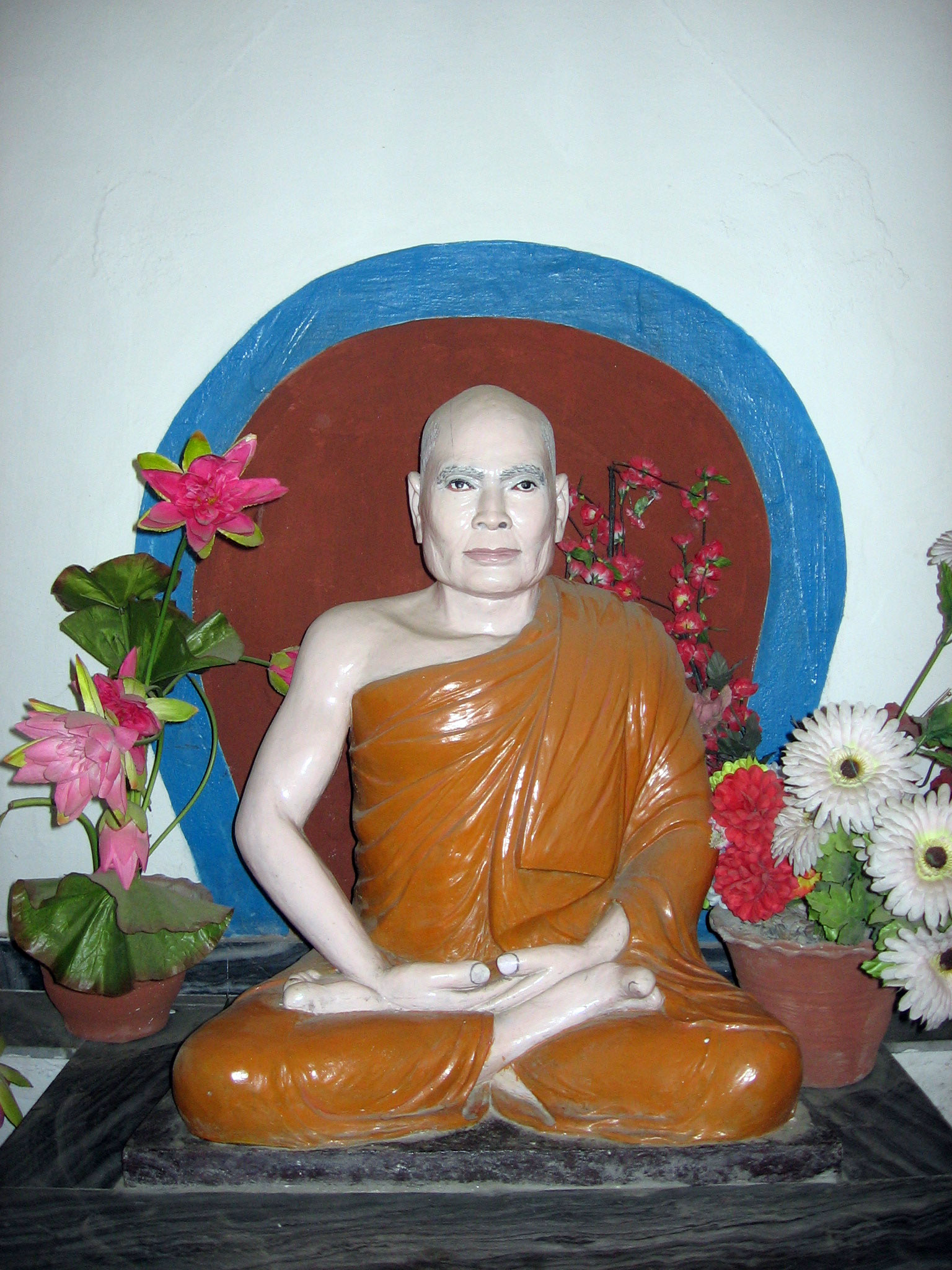
Statue of Dhammalok at Ananda Kuti Vihar.

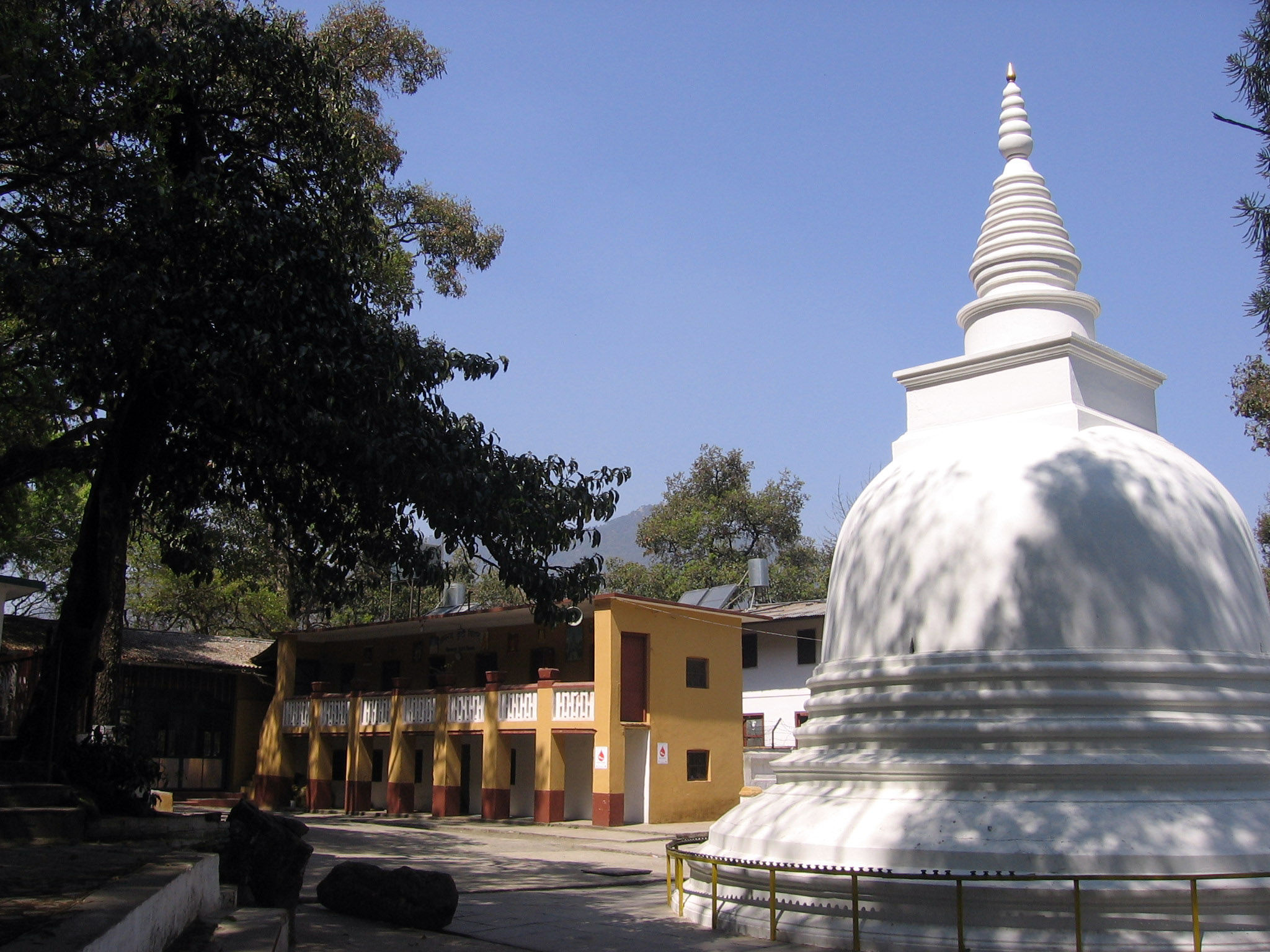
Ananda Kuti Vihar, Kathmandu.

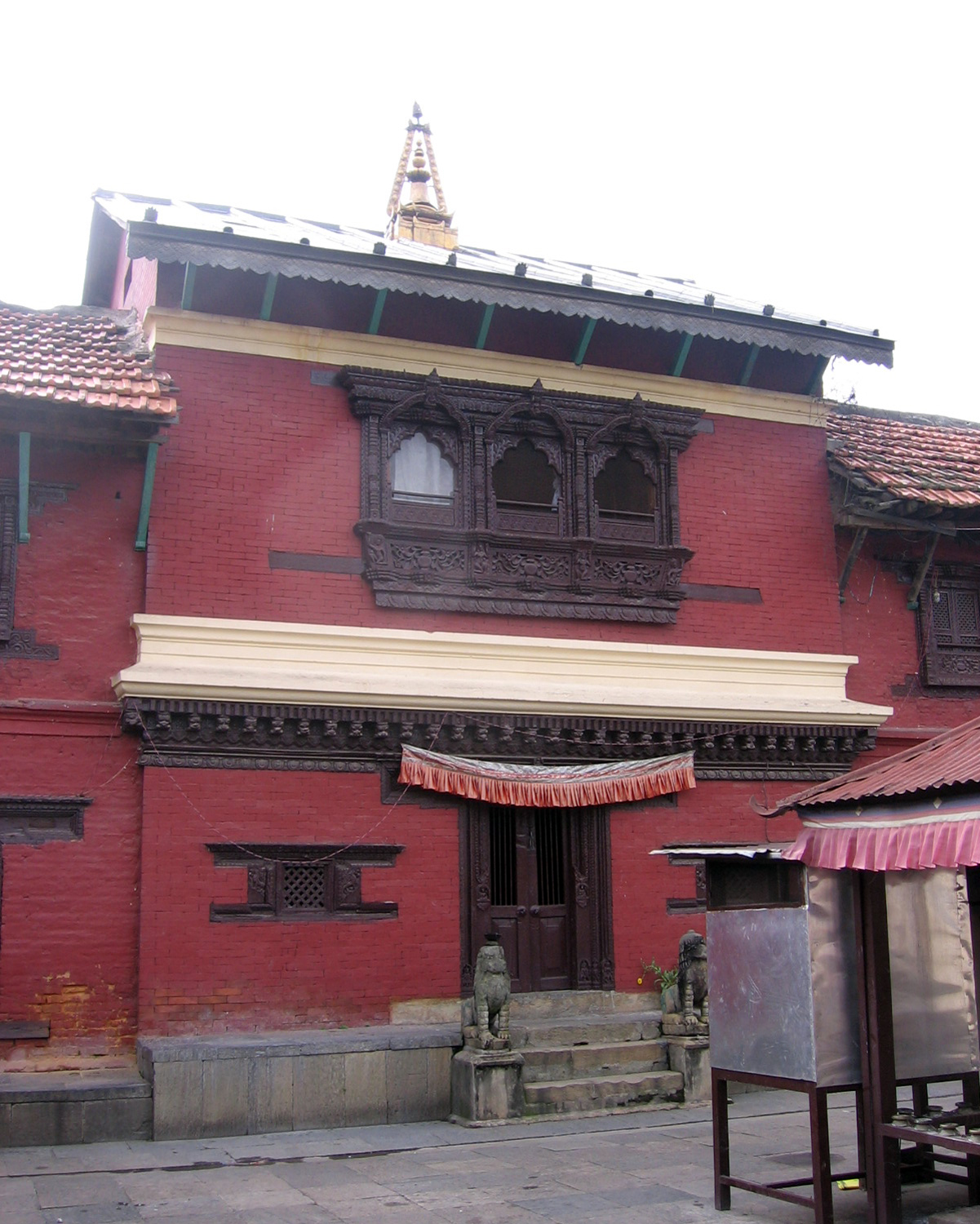
Kindo Baha, Kathmandu.

== See also ==
- Aniruddha Mahathera
- Banishment of Buddhist monks from Nepal
- Buddhism in Nepal
