= Chungmang =

Ward No. 10 of Pakhribas Municipality in Dhankuta District, Koshi Province, Nepal

Chungmang Chunmang
- Ward of Pakhribas Municipality
- Interactive map of Chungmang
- Country: Nepal
- Province: Koshi Province
- District: Dhankuta District
- Municipality: Pakhribas Municipality

Area
  - Total: 26.4 km^{2} (10.2 sq mi)

Population (2021)
  - Total: 2,210
  - Density: 83.7/km^{2} (217/sq mi)
- Time zone: UTC+5:45 (NPT)

Chungmang is Ward No. 10 of Pakhribas Municipality, in Dhankuta District of Koshi Province, Nepal. Formerly the Chungmang Village Development Committee (VDC), the area was merged into Pakhribas Municipality during Nepal's federal restructuring pursuant to the 2015 Constitution.

== Geography ==
Chungmang covers an area of 26.4 km^{2} (10.2 sq mi) and borders Pakhribas Municipality Ward No. 9 to the east, Ward No. 8 to the west and north, and Sahidbhumi Rural Municipality to the south. The ward includes settlements such as Besigaun, Gambhire, Hatuwali Tole, Lisimbu, Dansingh and Parajuli, among others.

== History ==
Historically, Chungmang lay on a salt trade route that connected local markets to the regional court (Kshetriya Adalat), which drew litigants and traders from as far as Ramechhap and Okhaldhunga.

== Demographics ==
According to the National Census 2078 (2021 CE), the ward had a population of 2,210: 1,100 males and 1,210 females. The major communities include Rai, Chhetri, Brahmin, Magar, Dalit and others, noted for long-standing social harmony and coexistence.

== Economy and agriculture ==
Chungmang's economy is primarily based on subsistence agriculture, producing paddy, potatoes, millet, mustard and other cash crops. Several agriculture and animal husbandry firms are registered and operating locally, though commercialisation remains limited. The area has potential for milk, mango, orange, banana, litchi, avocado and coffee production.

== Culture, religion and tourism ==
Tourism Attractions:

Bhulke - a small pond beside the Muga River. Local belief holds that fish once emerged from this spot with a large watercourse. Recent works by the Koshi Provincial Government added a road, water taps, rest stops, washrooms and a temple. Irrigation from the site serves Jhyamte Bar, Chuhade, Pangre, Doban, Khaya Bagar, Sathumure, Belbote and Dumje.

Saseshwar Temple, Shivalaya - established in 2018 BS by Agnidhar and Pushpalal Ghimire in memory of their father, Sashidhar Ghimire; daily worship and special ceremonies are held.

Chuche Singhadevi Sthan (Hatuwali Tole) - owned by the Chungmang Farm of PARC; devotees believe worship brings prosperity. Traditions include goat and pigeon offerings; special puja take place on the full moon days of Baisakh and Mangshir.

Kuthumi Subba Than - a shrine associated with local Subba lineage (details to be added).

Paruhang–Sumnima Park - a cultural site important for the Rai community's Udhauli and Ubhauli festivals.

Pashupati Panchayan Temple - located in Timsina Tole; built in 2078 BS at the initiative of social workers Dadhiram Timsina, Ganesh Prasad Timsina and Ramadevi Poudel; daily worship, bhajan and kirtan are held, with a special programme during Maha Shivaratri.

Bhut Daha - a pool along the Nakuwa Khola in Parajuli Tole with tourism potential.

Other shrines and sites include Chaurasi Devi (Ghyampe Gaun), Thaani Sthan (site of clan worship during Udhauli, Ubhauli and Dashain), and Alegaun Subbathan (worship on Dashain and the full moons of Mangshir and Baisakh).

Local organisations include the Nar Smriti Pratisthan commemorating social leader Nar Bahadur Kuthumi, and various community groups; a local Red Cross sub-branch and model farmers' groups are reported but require confirmation.

== Infrastructure ==
All wards and municipal centres are connected by rural road networks. Major local roads include the Dharmashala–Mansi Chautara–Raighat–Bhojpur Road and access to Gambhire Dovan. Additional feeder roads serve settlements across the ward.

== See also ==
- Pakhribas
- Dhankuta District
- Koshi Province
- Pakhribas Agricultural Centre

== Notes ==
Dates given in Bikram Samvat (BS) are retained as provided; Gregorian equivalents may be added with reliable sources.
