= Pragyananda Mahasthavir =

First Patriarch of Theravada Order in Nepal

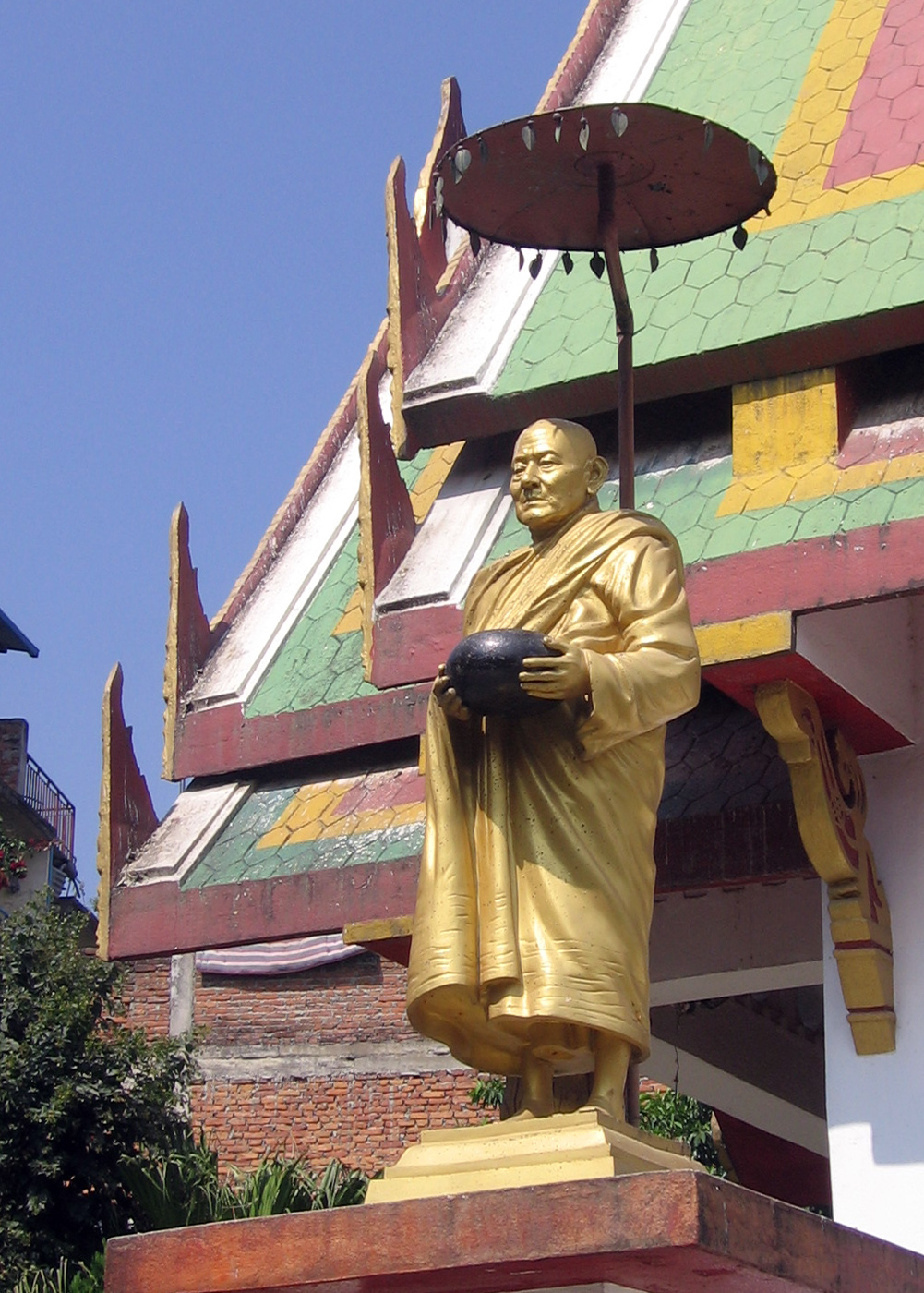
Statue of Pragyananda at Shri Kirti Vihara, Kirtipur

Pragyananda Mahasthavir (Nepali: प्रज्ञानन्द महास्थविर) (born Kul Man Singh Tuladhar) (2 May 1900 – 11 March 1993) was a Nepalese Buddhist monk who was one of the leaders of the revival of Theravada Buddhism in Nepal. In 1930, he became the first monk wearing yellow robes to be seen in Kathmandu since the 14th century.

Pragyananda served Buddhism and wrote religious literature in Nepal Bhasa when both the religion and language were being suppressed by the autocratic Rana regime. For these offenses, he was expelled from the country. Pragyananda also became the first Sangha Mahanayaka (Patriarch) of Nepal in modern times.

== Early life ==
Pragyananda was born in Itum Bahal, Kathmandu to a family of herbalists. His father was Harsha Bir Singh and his mother was Mohan Maya Tuladhar. Pragyananda's given name was Kul Man Singh Tuladhar. He was educated at Durbar High School in Kathmandu. After high school, he pursued further studies in Ayurvedic medicine and joined his ancestral occupation of dispensing herbal medicines.

== Ordination ==
Kul Man Singh went to Lhasa, Tibet at the age of 16 and engaged in business. He was married and running a flourishing business house when he met Mahapragya, a Nepalese monk of the Tibetan Buddhism school. He had been expelled from Nepal in 1926 for converting to Buddhism from Hinduism. Inspired by Mahapragya, he renounced the life of a householder and became a Tibetan novice monk, taking the name Karmasheel.

Subsequently, Karmasheel and Mahapragya went to Shigatse where they spent almost a year meditating in a cave. Not finding what they were searching for, the two travelled to Kushinagar in India, and in 1928, were reordained as Theravada monks. Mahapragya later became known as Bauddha Rishi Mahapragya.

Karmasheel returned to Nepal in 1930 as the first Theravada monk. A year later, he went to Myanmar and received full ordination in 1932, and was given the name Pragyananda. Returning to Kathmandu, Pragyananda lived at the monastery of Kindo Baha and gave religious discourses. The congregation coming to listen to his sermons kept growing which attracted the ire of the government.

== Into exile ==
The Rana regime ordered the monks to stop preaching Buddhism and writing in Nepal Bhasa. They refused, and on 30 July 1944, were ordered out of the country. Eight monks, including Pragyananda, Dhammalok Mahasthavir and Kumar Kashyap Mahasthavir left for India. In Sarnath, they founded a Buddhist association named Dharmodaya Sabha (Society for the Rise of the Teaching).

Pragyananda and the other monks returned to Nepal in 1946 after the ban was lifted following international pressure, and they resumed their work to spread Theravada Buddhism. Pragyananda spent a lot of his time at Pranidhipurna Mahavihar at Balambu which he had started in 1942. After the fall of the Rana regime and establishment of democracy in 1951, the faith became more firmly established in the country. Pragyananda was named the first Sangha Mahanayaka (Patriarch) of modern Nepal.

He was fluent in Nepal Bhasa, Nepali, Hindi, Tibetan, Bengali, Pali and Burmese. He has published 19 books related to Buddhism and also written a number of plays. In 1950, the play Dirghayu Rajkumar was staged at Nagam. Pragyananda was also a skilled artist, and he painted paubha scroll paintings. He died in Lalitpur.

In 2001, the Postal Service Department of the government of Nepal issued a commemorative postage stamp depicting his portrait. A statue of Pragyananda has been installed at the monastery of Nagara Mandapa Shri Kirti Vihara, Kirtipur.

== See also ==
- Banishment of Buddhist monks from Nepal
- Kindo Baha
- Pranidhipurna Mahavihar

== Sources ==
- LeVine, Sarah; Gellner, David N. (2005). Rebuilding Buddhism: The Theravada Movement in Twentieth-Century Nepal. Harvard University Press. ISBN 0-674-01908-3.
