= Aniruddha Mahathera =

Nepalese Buddhist monk (1915 - 2003)

- Born: Gaja Ratna Tuladhar; 15 December 1915; Asan, Kathmandu
- Died: 17 February 2003 (aged 87)
- Writing career
- Language: Nepal Bhasa
- Literary movement: Theravada revival in Nepal

Aniruddha Mahathera (Nepali: अनिरुद्ध महाथेरा) (born Gaja Ratna Tuladhar) (15 December 1915 – 17 February 2003) was a Nepalese Buddhist monk and the Sangha Nayak (Patriarch) of Nepal from 1998 until his death in 2003. He was one of the most important figures in the revival of Theravada Buddhism in Nepal and the development of Lumbini, the Buddha's birthplace in southern Nepal, into a center of international pilgrimage.

== Early life ==
Aniruddha (alternative name: Aniruddha Mahasthavir) was born at Asan Dhalasikwa, Kathmandu to father Das Ratna and mother Dibya Laxmi Tuladhar. He was named Gaja Ratna Tuladhar and belonged to a merchant family with a business house in Lhasa, Tibet. His father engaged in trade in Tibet before becoming a Buddhist monk taking up the name Dhammalok Mahasthavir.

Gaja Ratna was eight years old when his father Das Ratna took him along to Lhasa in 1923 as his mother had died and he couldn't be left behind in Kathmandu. Returning from Tibet, he was enrolled at Central Hindu Boarding School in Varanasi. In 1925, Gaja Ratna came back to Kathmandu.

== To Sri Lanka and Myanmar ==
Gaja Ratna accompanied his father to Kolkata on another business trip. There he decided that he wanted to study Buddhism in Sri Lanka, and in 1929, he sailed to Colombo. He enrolled in the Vidyalankara Pirivena Buddhist college and became a novice monk, and was given the name Aniruddha. After spending five years in Sri Lanka and becoming proficient in Sinhala, Pali, Sanskrit and English, he went to Kusinagar, India.

Aniruddha then traveled to Burma (now known as Myanmar) for further studies in Buddhism. A year later in 1937, he received higher ordination in Moulmein. He lived in Moulmein for 10 years studying Burmese and Buddhist literature. In the midst of his study, World War II came to Burma, and he had to keep moving to escape the fighting.

== Return to Nepal ==
Aniruddha returned to Nepal in 1946, and became the first editor of Dharmodaya, a Buddhist magazine in Nepal Bhasa which started publication in 1947 from Kalimpong.

Later, he moved to Lumbini and dedicated himself to developing it as a place of pilgrimage. Lumbini was then a vacant patch surrounded by jungle. The spot, marked by an Ashokan pillar, had been rediscovered in 1896. Aniruddha built a monastery and a rest house, and extended assistance to pilgrims. In 1967, Aniruddha received the then UN Secretary-General U Thant during his visit to Lumbini which led to the formulation of the Lumbini Development Master Plan.

Aniruddha spent 46 years in Lumbini and returned to Kathmandu in 1991 to become the abbot of Ananda Kuti Vihar at Swayambhu. He has translated Buddhists texts from Sinhala and Burmese into Nepal Bhasa and written and published 21 books.
