= Ghortikharka =

Coordinates: 27°5′N 87°15′E

Ghortikharka घोर्लिखर्क
- Village development committee
- Interactive map of Ghortikharka
- Country: Nepal
- Zone: Kosi Zone
- District: Dhankuta District

Population (1991)
  - Total: 2,736
- Time zone: UTC+5:45 (Nepal Time)

Ghortikharka is a village development committee in Dhankuta District in the Kosi Zone of eastern Nepal. At the time of the 1991 Nepal census it had a population of 2736 people living in 494 individual households.
