= Kumar Kashyap Mahasthavir =

Nepalese Theravadin Buddhist monk

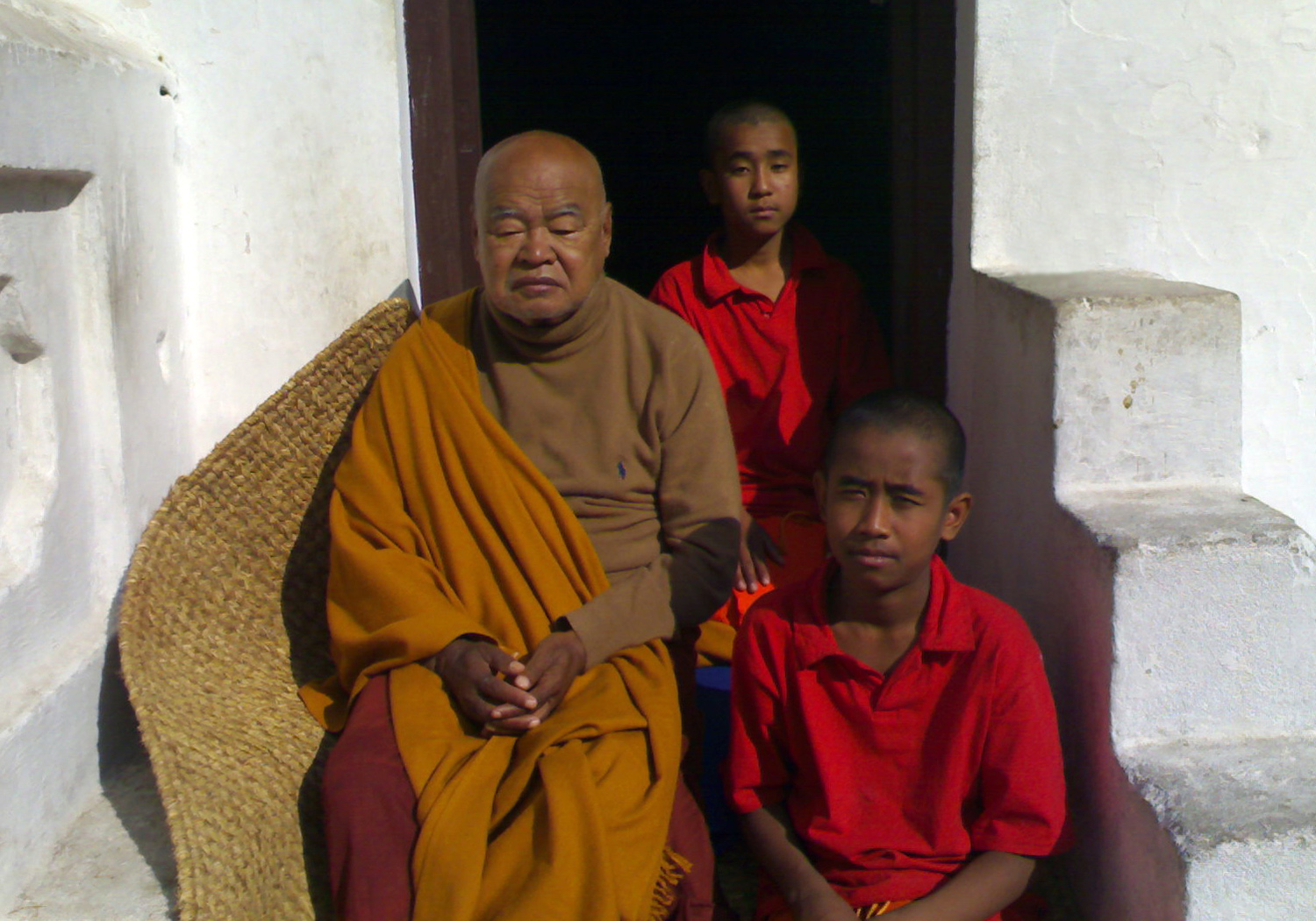
Kumar Bhante at Ananda Kuti Vihar in 2008.

Bhante Kumar Kashyap Mahasthavir (Nepali: कुमारकाश्यप महास्थविर) (born Asta Man Shakya) (24 July 1926 – 26 February 2012) was a Nepalese Buddhist monk who was awarded the title of Tripitakacharya (Tripitaka Master).

In 1944, he was expelled from Nepal by the Rana regime for promoting Theravada Buddhism and writing in Nepal Bhasa. He spent his exile in India and Sri Lanka.

== Early life ==
Kumar Kashyap (alternative name: Kumar Bhante) was born in Tansen, Palpa, a district in western Nepal. His father was Sanat Kumar Shakya and mother Tej Maya Shakya. He was known as Asta Man Shakya before he became a novice monk in 1942. After being ordained, Kumar Bhante moved to Kathmandu where he joined the small number of monks and worked to promote Theravada Buddhism.

== Into exile ==
The government was suspicious of the activities of the Buddhist monks as they were becoming increasingly popular. The monks were called before the prime minister and ordered to stop preaching Buddhism and writing in Nepal Bhasa which the regime disapproved of equally. They refused, and on 30 July 1944, were ordered out of the country.

The eight monks including Kumar Kashyap, Dhammalok Mahasthavir and Pragyananda Mahasthavir went to Kushinagar, India and then to Sarnath where they founded a Buddhist association named Dharmodaya Sabha (Society for the Rise of the Teaching). Kumar Kashyap later moved to Kalimpong and then to Sri Lanka.

== Return to Nepal ==
In 1946, the monks were allowed to return after a Sri Lankan goodwill mission visited Kathmandu and urged the government to withdraw the expulsion order.

Kumar Kashyap returned to Kathmandu and became a writer and teacher at Ananda Kuti Vidyapeeth in Swayambhu. He has published six books. His first book Gautam Buddha was published in 1956. He was editor of Anandabooumi, a Buddhist magazine published by Ananda Kuti Vihar. He was also named a patron of Nepal Lipi Guthi, an organization dedicated to preserving Nepalese scripts.

Kumar Kashyap became abbot of Ananda Kuti Vihar and held the post of Deputy Chief Monk when he died. Sri Lankan President Mahinda Rajapaksa and Prime Minister DM Jayaratne expressed grief at the demise of Kumar Bhante. The government of Myanmar has accorded him the title of Agga Maha Saddhammajothikadhaja and he has been honored by Buddhist organizations in India and Sri Lanka.

== See also ==
- Banishment of Buddhist monks from Nepal
