= Sanne Bjerg =

Danish opera librettist, director and novelist

Sanne Bjerg (born 11 February 1965) is a Danish opera librettist, director and novelist. She graduated from Forfatterskolen, the Danish writing school, in 1989. Bjerg was the director of PLEX Music Theatre (formerly Den Anden Opera).

Her opera librettos include Den sidste virtuos (1991), composed by Lars Klit, Løgn og latin (1998), composed by Svend Aaquist and I-K-O-N (2003), composed by John Frandsen.

== Publications ==
- Papaya-passionen, 1987 (novel)
- Fejltagelsernes Bog, 2017, (novel)
- Messi of the Ramblas, 2023, (novel)
