= Banishment of Buddhist monks from Nepal =

Persecution of Theravada Buddhism in Nepal in the early the 20th century

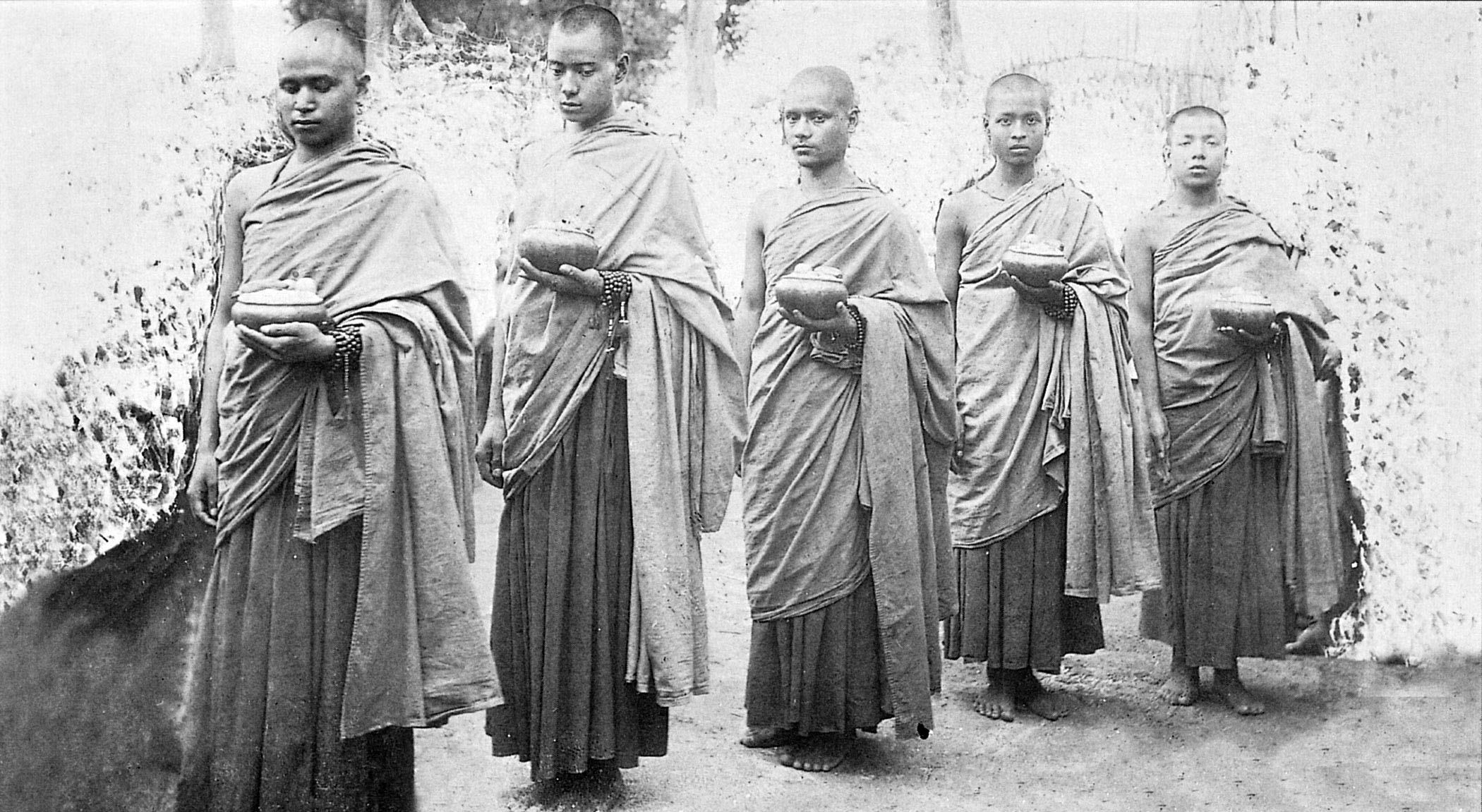
The group of five Buddhist monks exiled in 1926.

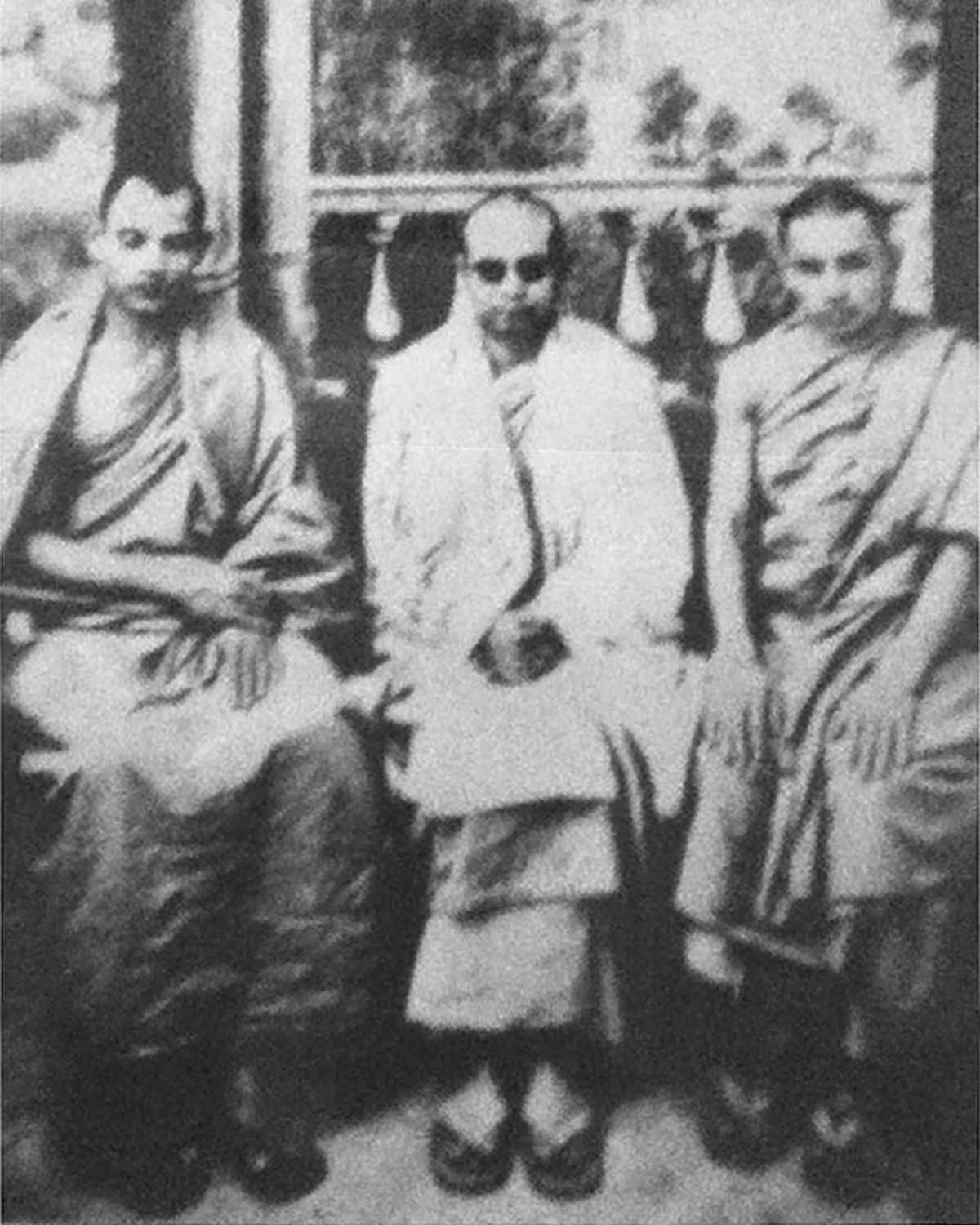
Pragyananda, Mahapragya and Shakyananda in Kalimpong in circa 1935.

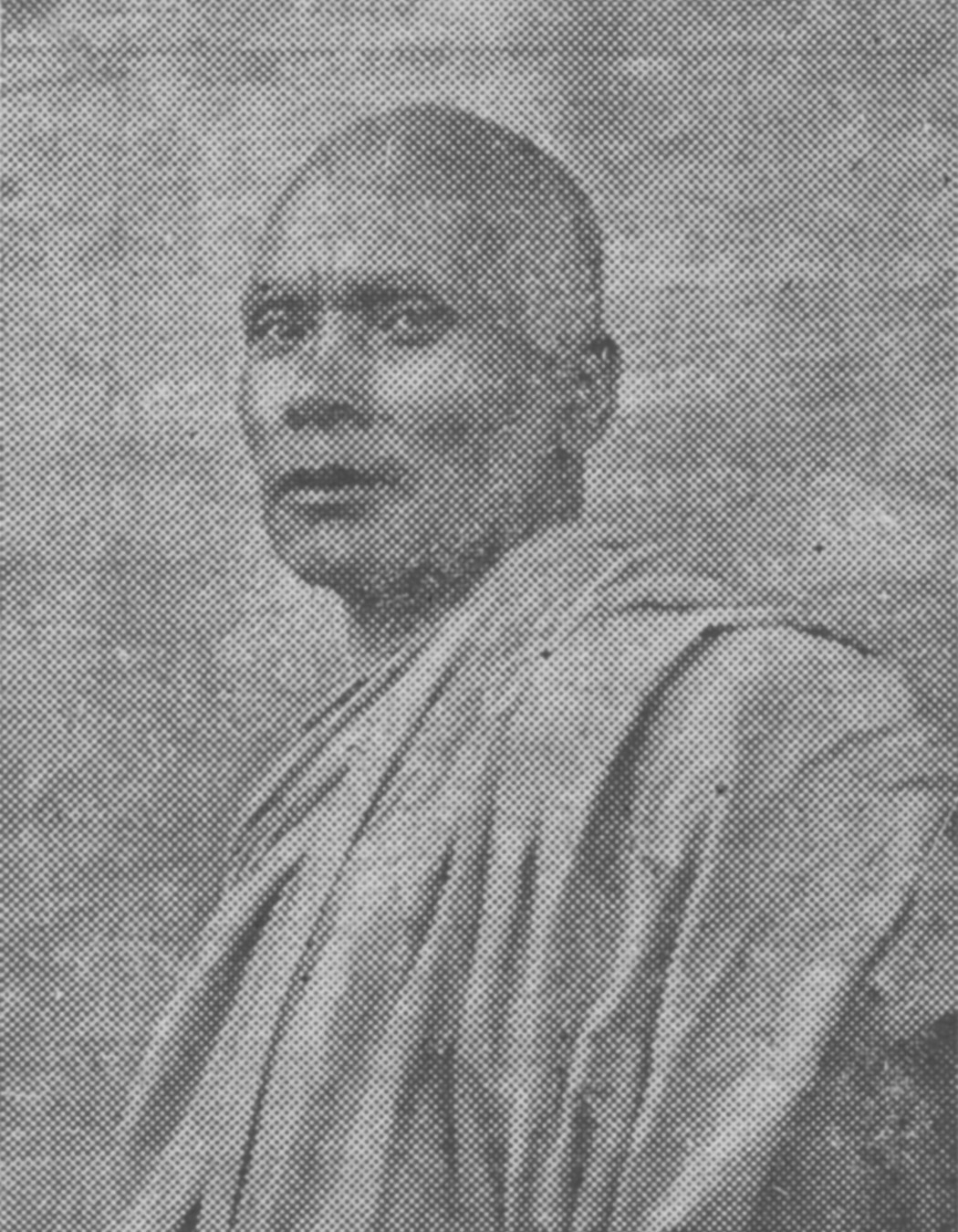
Dhammalok, expelled in 1944.

The banishment of Buddhist monks from Nepal was part of a campaign by the Rana government to suppress the resurgence of Theravada Buddhism in Nepal in the early 20th century. There were two deportations of monks from Kathmandu, in 1926 and 1944.

The exiled monks were the first group of monks to be seen in Nepal since the 14th century. They were at the forefront of a movement to revive Theravada Buddhism, which had disappeared from the country more than five hundred years before. Newar Buddhism is traditionally Vajrayana based. The Rana dynasty disapproved of Buddhism and the Newar language. It saw the activities of the monks and their growing following as a threat. When police harassment and imprisonment failed to deter the monks, all of whom were Newars, they were deported.

Among the charges made against them were preaching a new faith, converting Hindus, encouraging women to renounce and thereby undermining family life, and writing books in Newari.

== Expulsion of 1926 ==
In 1926, five monks along with their Tibetan guru Tsering Norbu were expelled from the country. These five monks, whose Dharma names were Bauddha Rishi Mahapragya, Mahaviryya, Mahachandra, Mahakhanti and Mahagnana, had been ordained under the Tibetan Buddhist tradition.

The government objected to Mahapragya, who was born a Hindu, converting to Buddhism and the monks making alms rounds in Kathmandu. The police arrested the monks and jailed and questioned them. The case went up to the prime minister, Chandra Shumsher JBR, who ordered their banishment. They were given a few days to beg for provisions under the condition that they return to the police station to sleep. Then they were marched to the Indian border under police escort. The five monks and their teacher first went to Bodh Gaya, India, from where they scattered, some of them going to Burma and Tibet.

== Expulsion of 1944 ==
In 1944, another group of eight monks were sent into exile. Their Dharma names were Pragyananda Mahasthavir, Dhammalok Mahasthavir, Subhodhananda, Pragyarashmi, Pragyarasa, Ratnajyoti, Agga Dhamma and Kumar Kashyap Mahasthavir. This time they were accused of encouraging women to renounce Hinduism and writing in Nepal Bhasa. The monks were summoned before the prime minister Juddha Shamsher Jang Bahadur Rana and ordered to sign a pledge that they would stop their activities. When they refused, they were ordered out of the country.

The monks went to Kushinagar and then Sarnath in India. There they founded Dharmodaya Sabha (Society for the Rise of the Teaching) which worked to promote Buddhism and published religious literature from exile. Some of the monks remained in India while others went to Tibet, Bhutan and Sri Lanka. Bhaju Ratna Kansakar, a Nepalese merchant based in Kalimpong, was one of their largest supporters in exile.

== Return from exile ==
In 1946, a Sri Lankan goodwill mission visited Kathmandu and interceded on behalf of the monks. The delegation emphasized that Nepal was the birthplace of Buddha, and that his followers should be free to practice their faith in the country where he was born. Subsequently, the ban was lifted and the monks returned and devoted themselves to spreading the faith with greater energy.

In 1951, the Rana regime was ousted by a revolution and democracy established in Nepal. With democracy, overt persecution of Buddhists ended.
