= Manav Nyaya Shastra =

First codified law of Nepal

Manava Nyaya Shastra
- Nyayavikashini
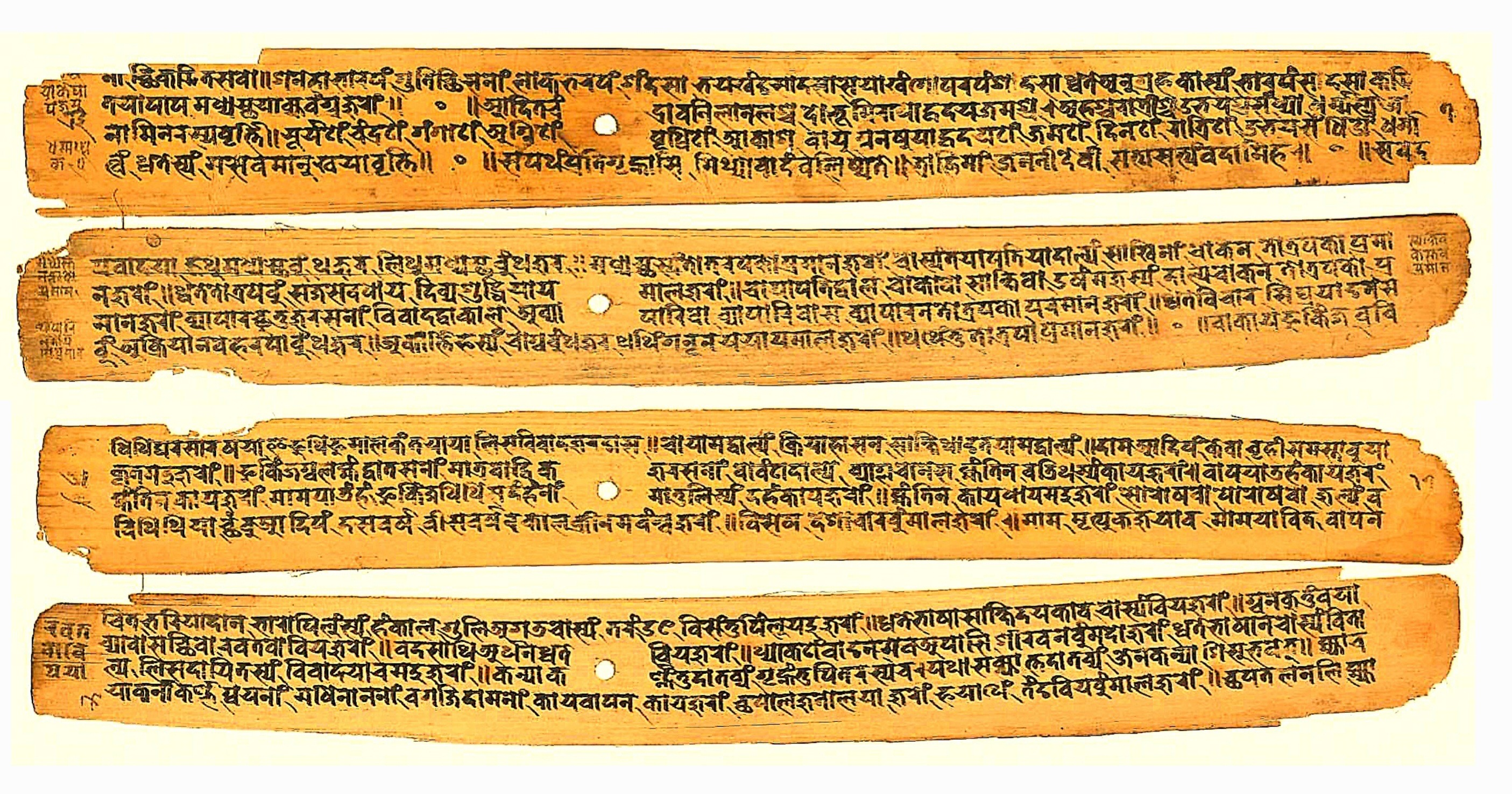
- A 14th century palm-leaf manuscript of the Manava Nyaya Shastra, written in Newar language and the Bhujimola script
- Author(s): Manikya
- Compiled by: Luntabhadra Vajracharya
- Patron: Jayasthiti Malla
- Language: Sanskrit and Classical Newar
- Date: 1380 CE
- Genre: Legal code

The Manava Nyaya Shastra, also known as Nyayavikasini, is a Newar-language commentery on the Naradasmriti and the first codified law of Nepal, written in the 14th century. It was authored by Manikya, and written by Luntabhadra Vajracharya under the commission of King Jayasthiti Malla. Along with Gopal Raj Vamshavali, the Manava Nyaya Shastra is considered one of the most important works in Classical Newar language.

== History ==
The Manava Nyaya Shastra was written by translating the Naradasmriti, which Jayasthiti Malla had commissioned to be translated into Newar language. A scholar named Manikya translated the Naradasmriti and authored a commentary on it in the Newar language. The manuscript was written by the scribe Luntabhadra Vajracharya of Kirtipunya Mahavihara in 1380 CE and was given to Jayata Varman, a minister of Jayasthiti.

Later, during King Jayasthiti Malla's reign (1382-1395), his rule, was based on the principles of this text. It become one of the major source of rendering justice during the medieval period. Following the popularity of Newar translation and commentary, numerous copies of the Nyayavikashini were written. Many Newar manuscripts of the Manava Nyaya Shastra are today found in the National Archives of Nepal, the Asa archives and the Cambridge University Library.

== Structure ==
The Manava Nyaya Shastra contains the following eighteen tittle of laws:

1. Ṛṇā dāna (Recovery of debts)
2. Upanidhi (Deposit, lending, bailment)
3. Sambhūya Samutthāna (Partnership)
4. Dattāpradānika (Gifts and resumption thereof)
5. Abhyupetā Śuśrūṣā (Breach of contract of service)
6. Vetanasya Anapākarman (Non-payment of wages)
7. Asvāmi Vikraya (Sale without ownership)
8. Vikrīyā Sampradāna (Non-delivery after sale)
9. Krītānuśaya (Rescission of purchase)
10. Samayasya Anapākarman (Violation of conventions of corporations, guilds, etc.)
11. Sīmābandha (Settlement of boundaries)
12. Strīṣu Saṃyoga (Marital relation)
13. Dāyabhāga (Partition and inheritance)
14. Sāhasāḥ (Offences in which force is the principal element such as homicide, robbery, rape, etc.)
15. Vāk Pāruṣya, Daṇḍa Pāruṣya (Defamation and abuse, hurt of various kinds)
16. Dyūta Samāhvaya (Gambling)
17. Prakīrṇaka (Miscellaneous wrongs)
18. Caura Pratiṣedha (Theft)

== Publications ==
=== Editions ===
- Vajracharya, Shanta Harsha, ed. (1987). Nyāyavikāsinī (mānava nyāyaśāstra) (in Sanskrit and Classical Newari). Kathmandu: Nepal Bhasa Parishad.

=== Translations ===
- Pant, Dinesh Raj, ed. (2008). Nyāyavikāsinī (mānavanyāyaśāstra). Kathmandu: UNDP. ISBN 978-9937-2-0908-3.
- Jayasthiti Malladvārā Vi. Saṃ. 1436 mā banāuna lagāieko kānūn [Law enacted by Jayasthiti Malla in 1436 BS] (in Nepali). Nepal Law Commission, Government of Nepal.

== See also ==
- Newar literature
- Jayasthiti Malla
- Newar language
- Malla dynasty (Nepal)
