= Nepalese scripts =

Alphabetic writing systems for Nepal Bhasa

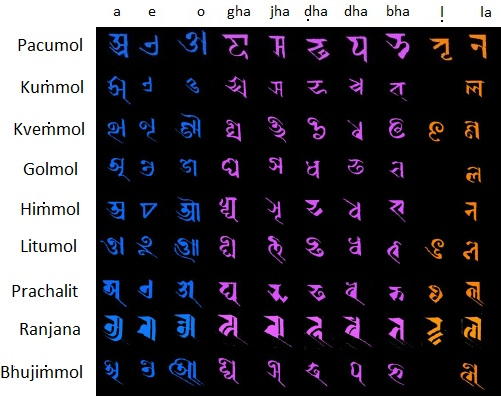
- Script type: Abugida
- Direction: Left-to-right
- Region: Nepal and India
- Languages: Nepal Bhasa

Related scripts
- Parent systems: Proto-Sinaitic script: Phoenician alphabet; Aramaic script; Brāhmī; Gupta; Siddham; Gaudi; Nepalese scripts
- Child systems: Ranjana, Bhujimol, Newar

Nepalese scripts (Nepal Lipi: 𑐣𑐾𑐥𑐵𑐮 𑐁𑐏𑐮, Devanagari: नेपाल आखल) are a family of alphabetic writing systems employed historically in Nepal Mandala by the indigenous Newar people for primarily writing Nepal Bhasa. It is also used for transcribing Sanskrit.

These scripts were in widespread use from the 10th to the early 20th-century, but have since been largely supplanted by the modern script known as Devanagari. Of the older scripts, about 50,000 manuscripts written in Newar script have been archived.

== History ==
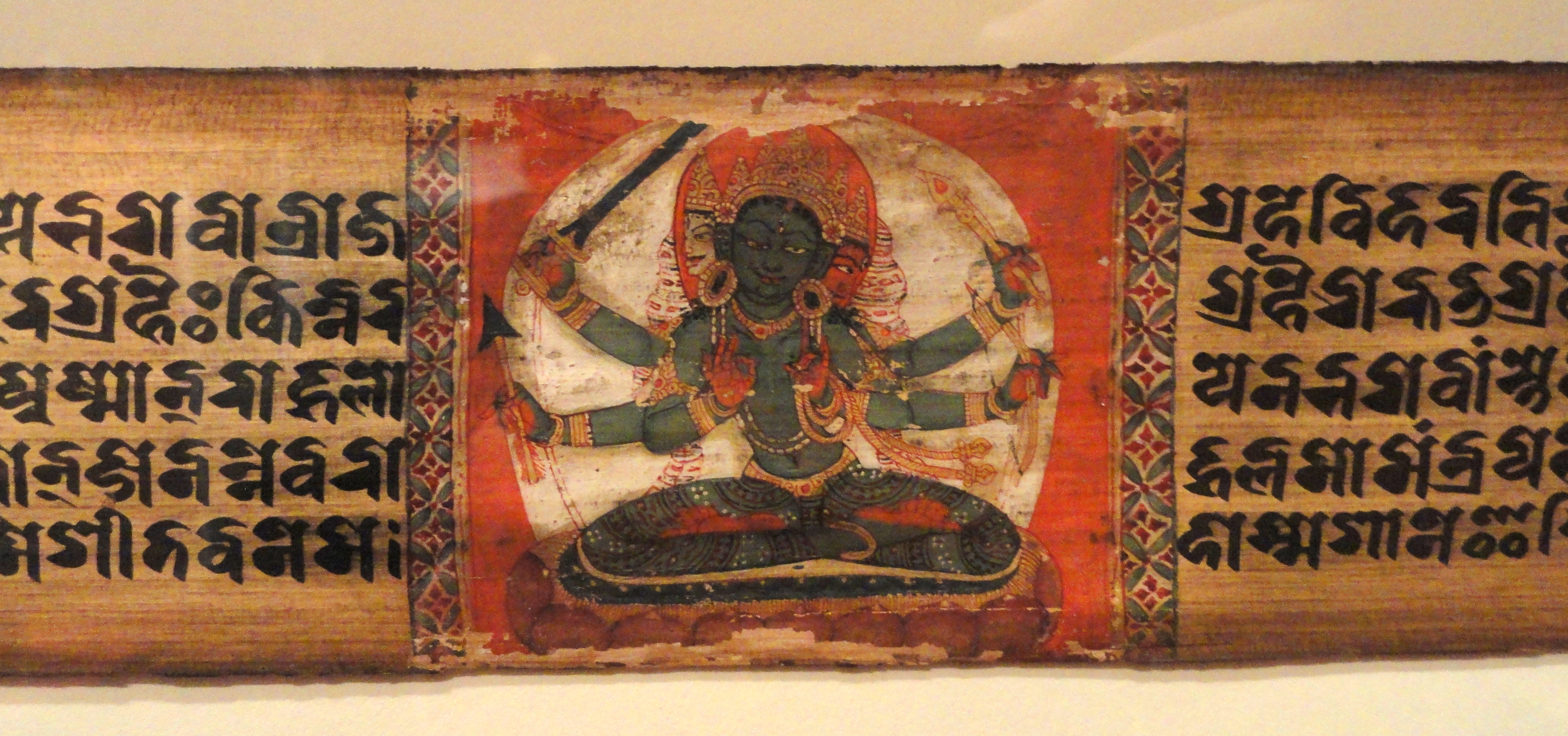
An 1136 CE manuscript written in the Bhujimol script.

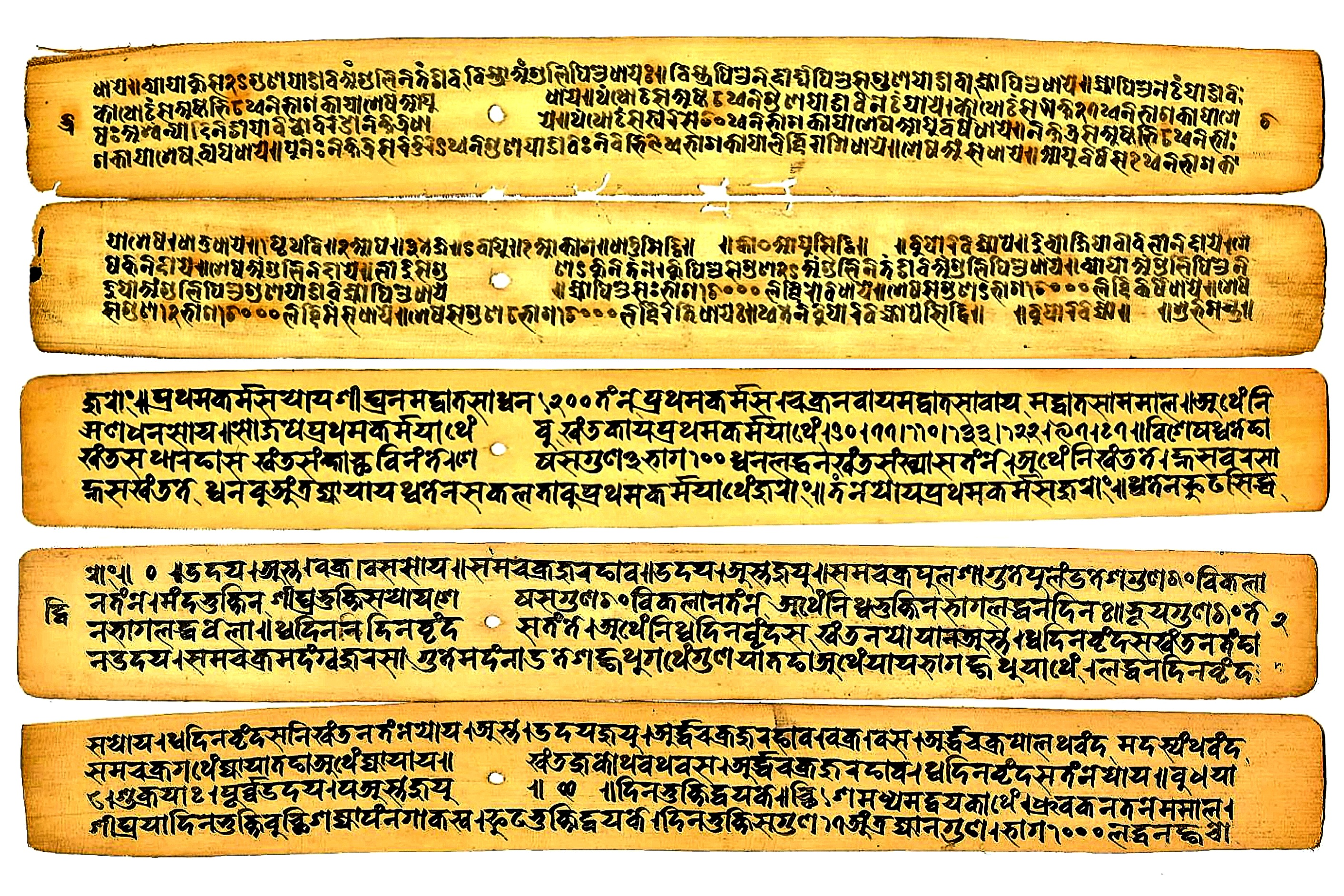
A 1408 CE palm-leaf manuscript of astrology in Classical Newar, written in Bhujimol script (top) and Newar script (bottom).

Letter of Ming Dynasty's Yongle Emperor of China to Shaktisimha Rama of Nepal, Ranjana script, 1415 CE.

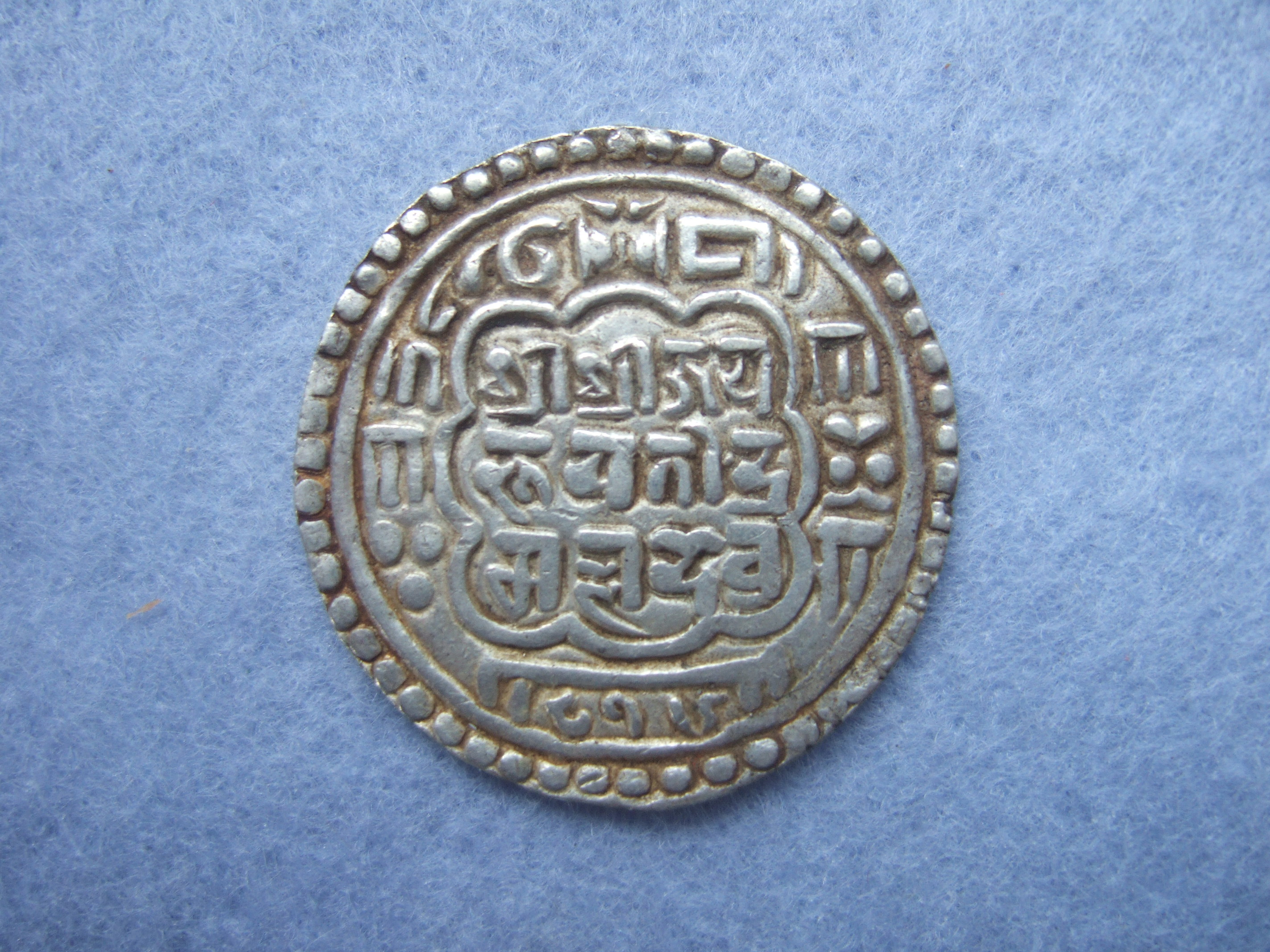
The coin legend "Śrī Śrī Jaya Bhūpatīndra Malla Deva 816" (1696 CE), inscribed in Newar script.

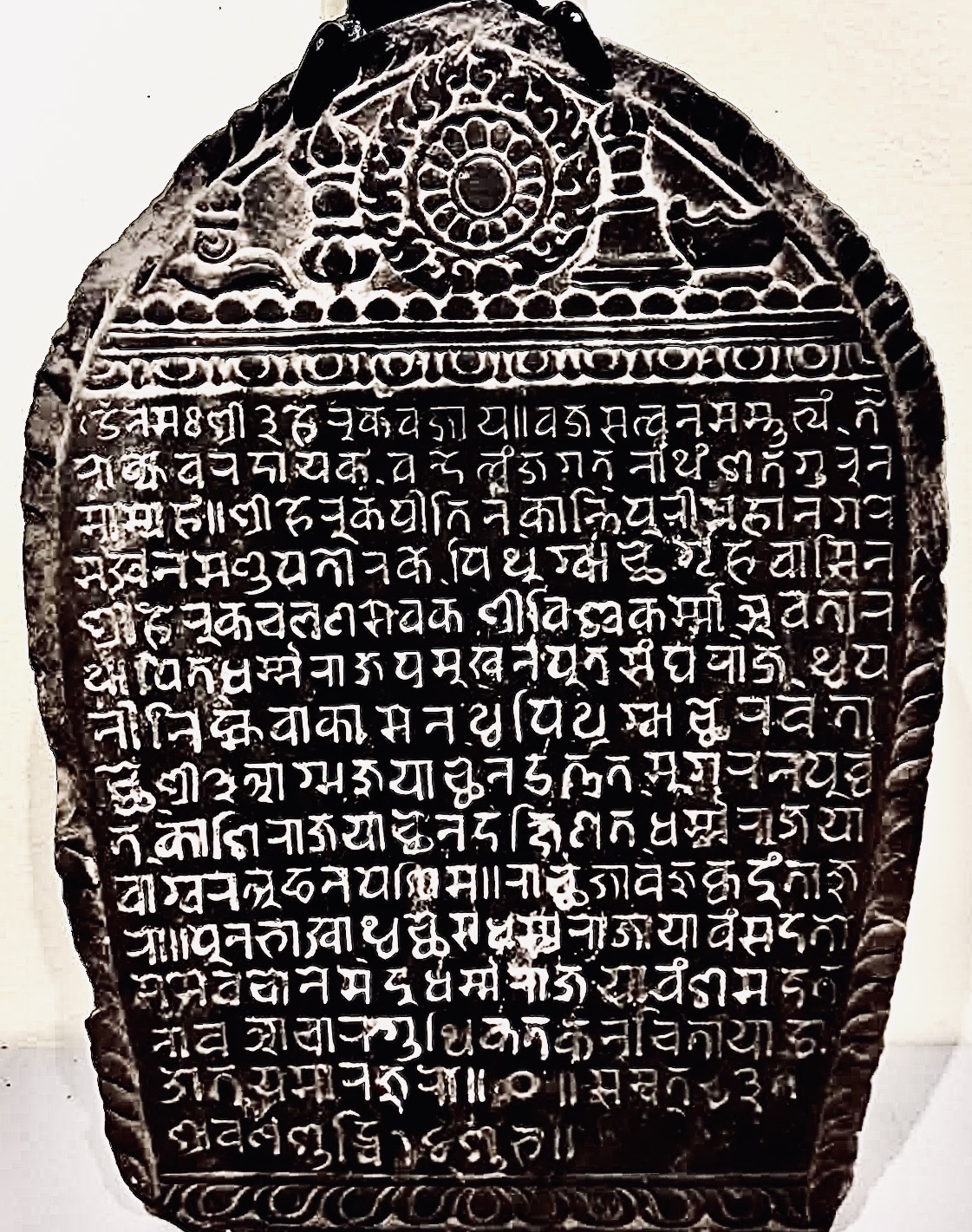
A Newar language inscription from Makhan Tole, Newar script, 1717 CE.

=== Pre development ===
Prior to development of Nepalese scripts, people in the Nepal Mandala used the following scripts which are shared within the South Asian region.

- Brāhmī script – Ashoka period
- Gupta script (Note: It is also referred as Purva-Licchavi script.) – early Licchavi period
- Kutila script (Note: It is also named Uttar-Licchavi script or Kuṭila (the regional variants of the Siddham script). The Kuṭila script – see Category:Kutila script.) – late Licchavi period (7th–10th century)

The Newari script is an evolution of the old Eastern script, which also led to the Bengali–Assamese, Maithili and Oriya scripts.

=== Early usage and development ===
The 'Nepal Script' or 'Nepalese script' appeared in the 10th century. The earliest instance is a manuscript entitled Lankavatara Sutra dated Nepal Era 28 (908 CE), written in the Newar script. Another early specimen is a palm-leaf manuscript of a Buddhist text the Prajnaparamita, dated Nepal Era 40 (920 CE). One of the oldest manuscript of Ramayana, preserved till date, was written in the Newar script in 1020.

The script has been used on stone and copper plate inscriptions, coins (Nepalese mohar), palm-leaf documents and Hindu and Buddhist manuscripts. Among the famed historical texts written in Nepalese scripts are Gopal Raj Vamshavali, a history of Nepal written in 1389 using the Bhujimol script; the Nepal-Tibet Treaty of 1775, written in the Newar script; and a letter dated Nepal Era 535 (1415 CE) sent by Chinese Ming Emperor Yongle to Shakti-simha-rama, a feudatory of Banepa, written in the Ranjana script.

Besides the Kathmandu Valley and the Himalayan region in Nepal, the Ranjana script is used for sacred purposes in Tibet, China, Japan, Korea, Mongolia, Bhutan, Sikkim and Ladakh. The Jokhang Temple in Lhasa, Tibet is ornamented with mantras embossed in Ranjana script, and the panels under the eaves are numbered using Newar script.

=== Decline ===
In 1906, the Rana regime banned Nepal Bhasa, Nepal Era and Nepalese scripts from official use as part of its policy to subdue them, and the script fell into decline. Authors were also encouraged to switch to Devanagari to write Nepal Bhasa because of the availability of moveable type for printing, and Newar script was pushed further into the background. However, the script continued to be used for religious and ceremonial purposes till the 1950s.

=== Revival ===
After the Rana dynasty was overthrown and democracy established in 1951, restrictions on Nepal Bhasa were lifted. Attempts were made to study and revive the old scripts, and alphabet books were published. Hemraj Shakyavamsha published an alphabet book of 15 types of Nepalese alphabets including Ranjana, Bhujimol and Pachumol.

In 1952, a pressman Pushpa Ratna Sagar of Kathmandu had moveable type of Newar script made in India. The metal type was used to print the dateline and the titles of the articles in Thaunkanhe monthly. In 1989, the first book to be printed using a computer typeface of Newar script, Prasiddha Bajracharyapinigu Sanchhipta Bibaran ("Profiles of Renowned Bajracharyas") by Badri Ratna Bajracharya, was published.

== Types ==
The scripts known to have been used by the Newar people and dynasties of pre-Gorkha Nepal (i.e., Nepala Mandala) are as follows:

- Rañjana style
  - Rañjana script
- Flat-headed style
  - Newar script
  - Pāchūmol script
  - Hiṁmol script
  - Kuṁmol script
- Curve-headed style
  - Bhujiṁmol script
  - Golmol script
  - Kveṁmol script
  - Litumol script

Among the different scripts based on Nepalese scripts, Ranjana (meaning "delightful"), Bhujinmol ("fly-headed") and Newar also known as 'Prachalit' ("prevalent") are the most common. Ranjana is the most ornate among the scripts. It is most commonly used to write Buddhist texts and inscribe mantras on prayer wheels, shrines, temples, and monasteries. The popular Buddhist mantra Om mani padme hum (meaning ("Hail to the jewel in the lotus" in Sanskrit) is often written in Ranjana.

== Description ==
=== Consonants ===
Newar	Rañjanā	Dev.	Rom.
𑐎		क	ka
𑐏		ख	kha
𑐐		ग	ga
𑐑		घ	gha
𑐒		ङ	ṅa
𑐴𑑂𑐒		ह्ङ	ṅha
𑐔		च	ca
𑐕		छ	cha
𑐖		ज	ja
𑐗		झ	jha
𑐘		ञ	ña
𑐴𑑂𑐘		ञ्ह	ñha

Newar	Rañjanā	Dev.	Rom.
𑐚		ट	ṭa
𑐛		ठ	ṭha
𑐜		ड	ḍa
𑐝		ढ	ḍha
𑐞		ण	ṇa
𑐴𑑂𑐞		ह्ण	ṇha
𑐟		त	ta
𑐠		थ	tha
𑐡		द	da
𑐢		ध	dha
𑐣		न	na
𑐴𑑂𑐣		ह्न	nha

Newar	Rañjanā	Dev.	Rom.
𑐥		प	pa
𑐦		फ	pha
𑐧		ब	ba
𑐨		भ	bha
𑐩		म	ma
𑐴𑑂𑐩		ह्म	mha
𑐫		य	ya
𑐬		र	ra
𑐴𑑂𑐬		ह्र	rha
𑐮		ल	la
𑐴𑑂𑐮		ह्ल	lha
𑐰		व	va

Newar	Rañjanā	Dev.	Rom.
𑐱		श	śa
𑐲		ष	ṣa
𑐳		स	sa
𑐴		ह	ha
𑐎𑑂𑐲		क्ष	kṣa
𑐟𑑂𑐬		त्र	tra
𑐖𑑂𑐘		ज्ञ	jña

The compound letters kṣa, tra and jña are often regarded as separate letters that are taught together with the other letters. Since the Newari language lacks retroflex consonants, the letters ṭa, ṭha, ḍa, ḍha, ṇa and ṣa are used only in loanwords. The same applies to the letter śa. Newari, on the other hand, has a number of sonorant consonants that are pronounced with creaky voice (ṅha, ñha, ṇha, nha, mha, rha and lha). They are written in compound letters consisting of "ha" combined with the letter for the corresponding modal sonorant.

==== Contextual forms ====
Letters with alternative forms (bha and ha) and letters that form ligatures together with the vowel u (ja and ra ). Also note that "u" changes shape when combined with "bha".

Some letters have alternative forms that are used when combined with certain vowel diacritics or included in a consonant cluster.

- Letter bha and ha changes appearance when combined with any of the vowel diacritics u, ū, ṛ, ṝ, ḷ and ḹ.
- Letter ja and ra forms ligatures together with the vowels u and ū.
- Vowels u changes appearance when combined with the letters ga, ta, bha and śa.

==== Compound letters ====
Example of how the letters ka and ya are written together to form the letter kya. When ka is in the initial position and is followed by a letter with two bars, extend ka to the right so that it overlaps the following letter

Consonant clusters are written by writing several consonant letters together in complex ligatures. How they are written depends on the shape of the letters and some letters have alternative shapes that are used depending on their position in the cluster.

=== Vowels ===
Newar	Rañjanā	Dev.	Rom.
𑐀		अ	a
𑐁		आ	ā
𑐂		इ	i
𑐃		ई	ī
𑐄		उ	u
𑐅		ऊ	ū

Newar	Rañjanā	Dev.	Rom.
𑐆		ऋ	ṛ
𑐇		ॠ	ṝ
𑐊		ए	e
𑐋		ऐ	ai
𑐌		ओ	o
𑐍		औ	au

Newar	Rañjanā	Dev.	Rom.
𑐀𑐫𑑂		अय्	ay
𑐁𑐫𑑂		आय्	āy
𑐊𑐫𑑂		एय्	ey

The vowel ṛ which in Sanskrit stands for syllable forming [ṛ] is used in Newar script to write the syllable ri.

In Newari, the vowels a and ā are pronounced with different vowel qualities. In order to write their long equivalents, some diacritics have been given partially different properties than what is otherwise usual in Brahmic scripts.

Letter		Name		Transcription		Description
Newar	Rañjanā	Sanskrit	Newari	Dev.	Rom.	Description
𑐀𑑅		visarga	lyuphuti	अः	aḥ	Usually used to indicate that a vowel is followed by an h-sound. In Newari it is used instead of marking a long vowel.
𑐀𑑃		candrabindu	milaphuti	अँ	am̐	Marks a nasal vowel.
𑐀𑑄		anusvāra	sinhaphuti	अं	aṃ	In other words, it can be seen as a combination of visarga and chandrabindu.

==== Vowel diacritics ====
===== Newar =====
Some of the vowel diacritics have different appearances depending on whether the consonant has a top line or not. There are seven consonants without top lines: ga, ña, ṭha, ṇa, tha, dha and śa.

	a	aḥ	ā	āḥ	i	ī	u	ū	ṛ	ṝ	e	ai	o	au	am̐	aṃ
क ka	𑐎	𑐎𑑅	𑐎𑐵	𑐎𑑅	𑐎𑐶	𑐎𑐷	𑐎𑐸	𑐎𑐹	𑐎𑐺	𑐎𑐻	𑐎𑐾	𑐎𑐿	𑐎𑑀	𑐎𑑁	𑐎𑑃	𑐎𑑄
ग ga	𑐐	𑐐𑑅	𑐐𑐵	𑐐𑐵𑑅	𑐐𑐶	𑐐𑐷	𑐐𑐸	𑐐𑐹	𑐐𑐺	𑐐𑐻	𑐐𑐾	𑐐𑐿	𑐐𑑀	𑐐𑑁	𑐐𑑃	𑐐𑑄

===== Rañjanā =====
The vowel diacritics can have up to three different appearances depending on which consonant they are combined with. The rules for ka are also used for ja, kṣa and jña. The rules for ga also apply to kha, ña, ṭha, ṇa, tha, dha and sha. The rules for ba are used for other letters.

Rules for क ka

Rules for ग ga

Rules for ब ba

=== Letter numerals ===
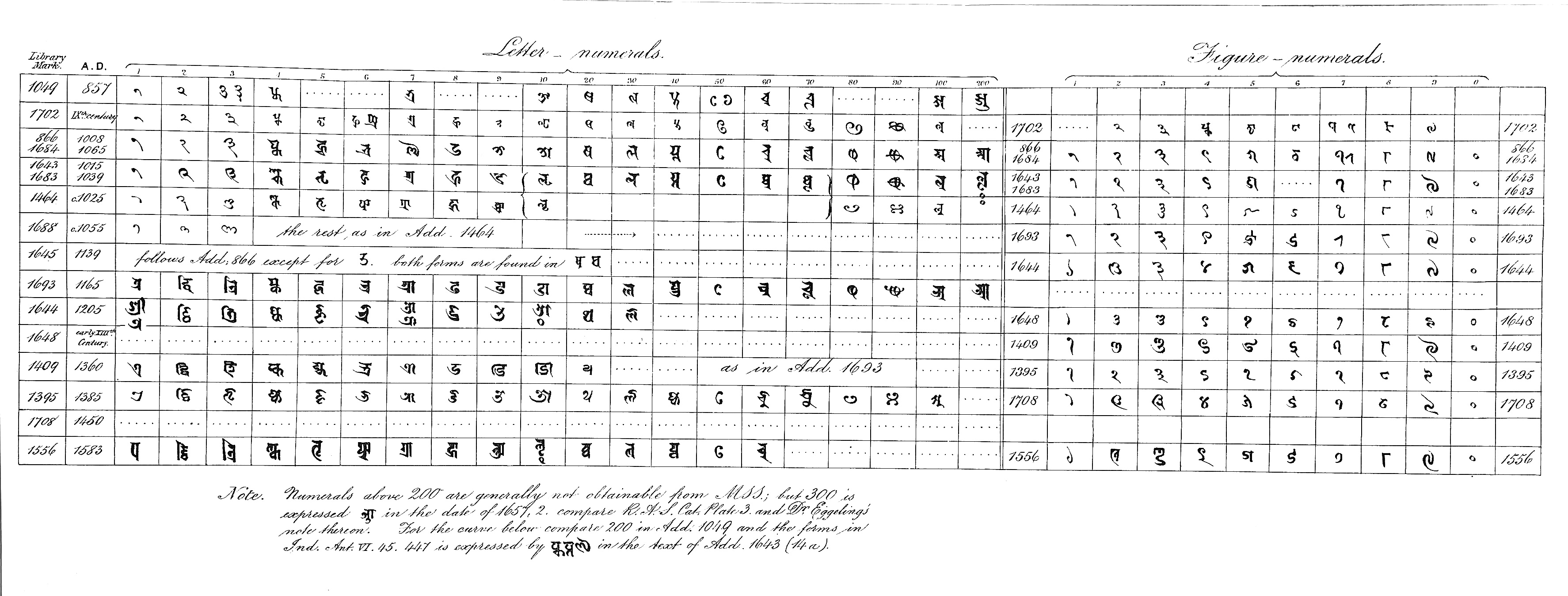
Nepalese letter-numerals and figure-numerals, based on manuscripts from different times.

Nepalese manuscripts used a system of letters to stand for numbers, although the exact correspondence between letter and number value changed over time. In 1883, Cecil Bendall published a table of Nepalese letter numerals based on different dated Nepalese manuscripts from Cambridge University Library.

== Current use ==
Newar script is available in Unicode as Newa script. It is the official script used to write Nepal Bhasa. Ranjana script has been proposed for encoding in Unicode.

The letter heads of Kathmandu Metropolitan City, Lalitpur Metropolitan City, Bhaktapur Municipality, Madhyapur Thimi Municipality ascribes its names in Ranjana Script.

In India, the official script for Newar language is Newar script.

== Gallery ==
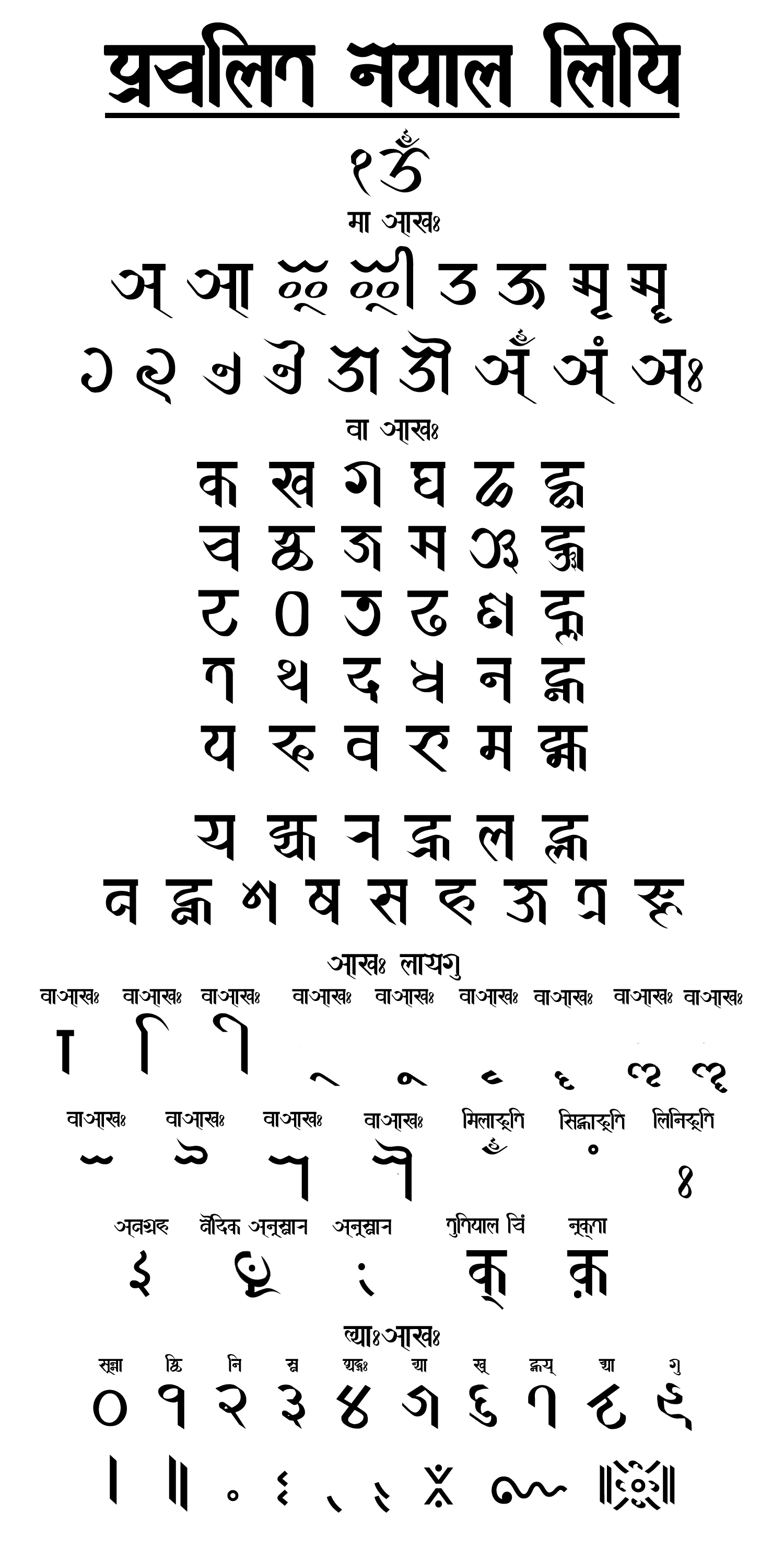
Newar Varnamala.

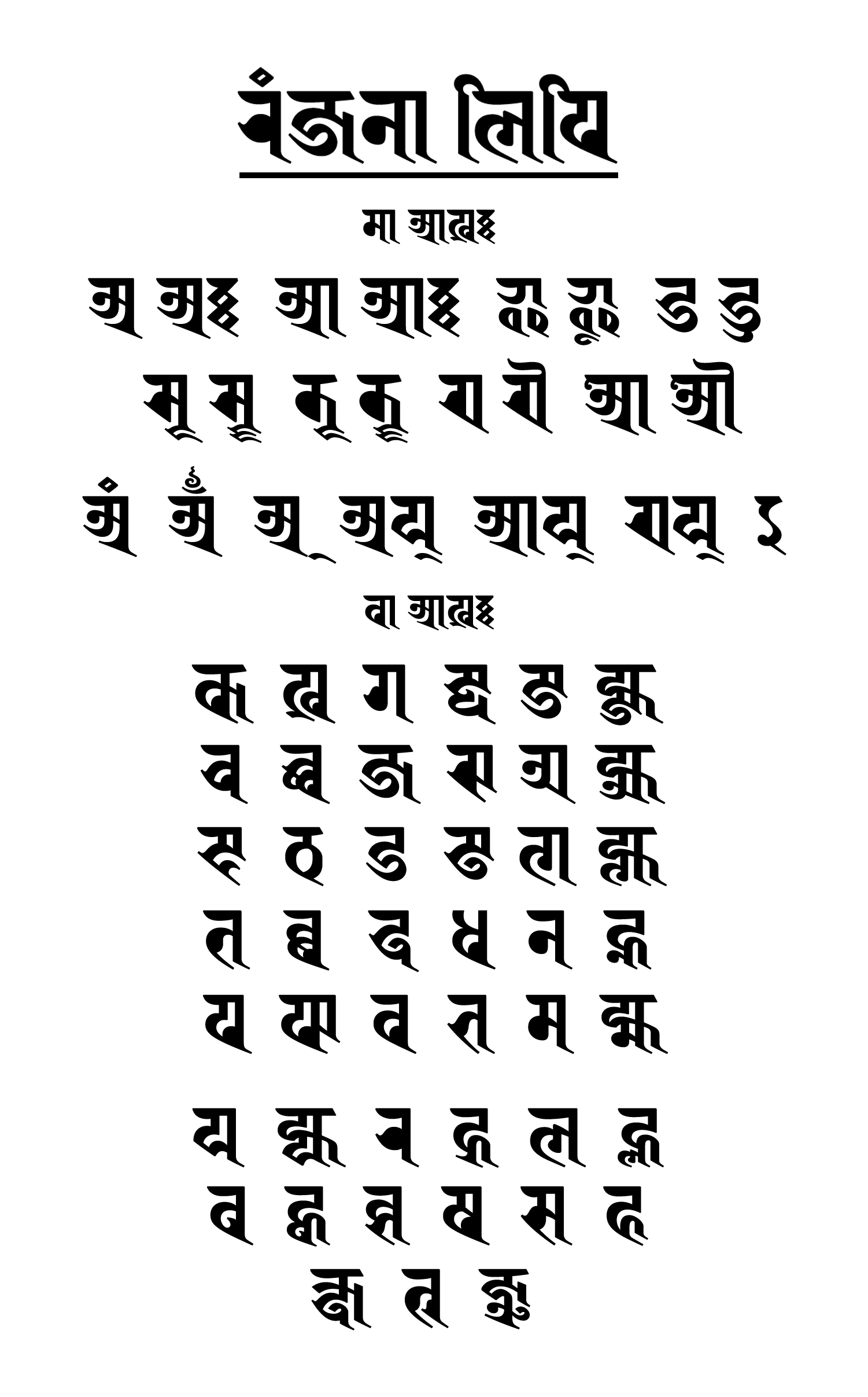
Ranjana Varnamala

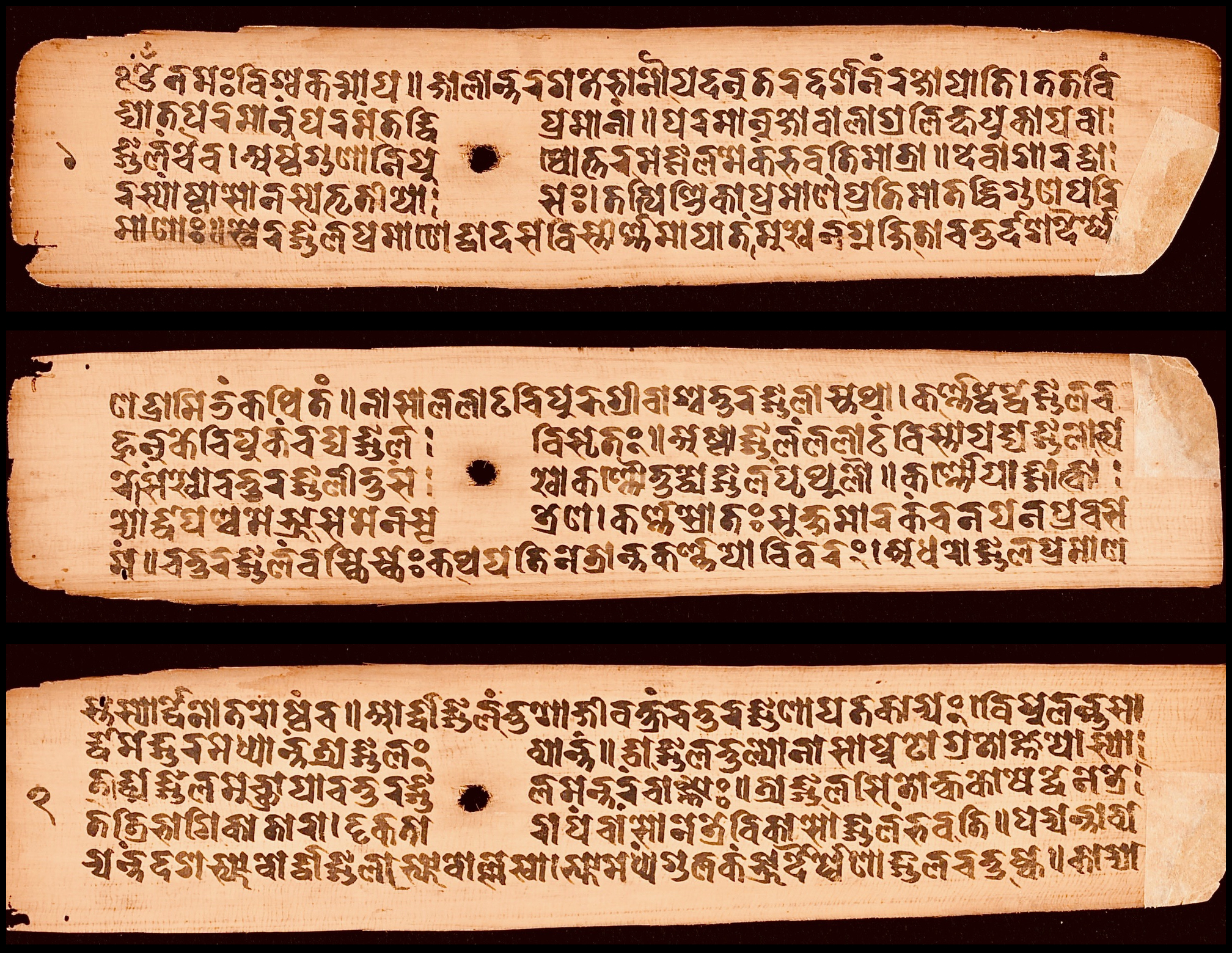
A 1279 CE palm-leaf manuscript written in the Bhujimol script.

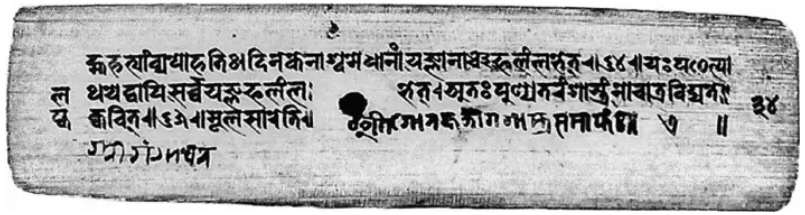
One folio of the Gorakṣayogaśāstra, a 15th century hatha yoga text, Newar script.

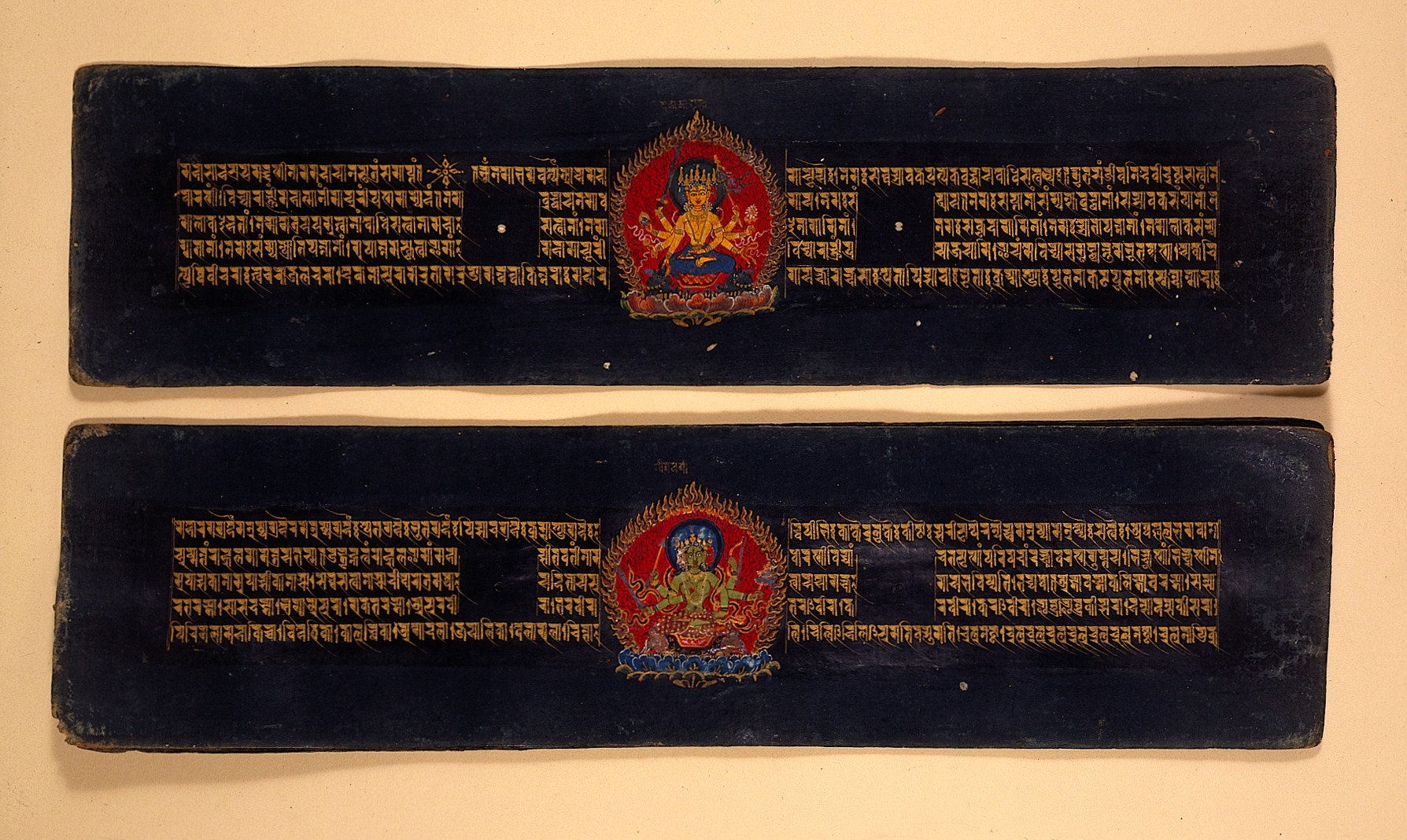
Manuscript of Pancharaksha in the Ranjana script, 1653 CE.

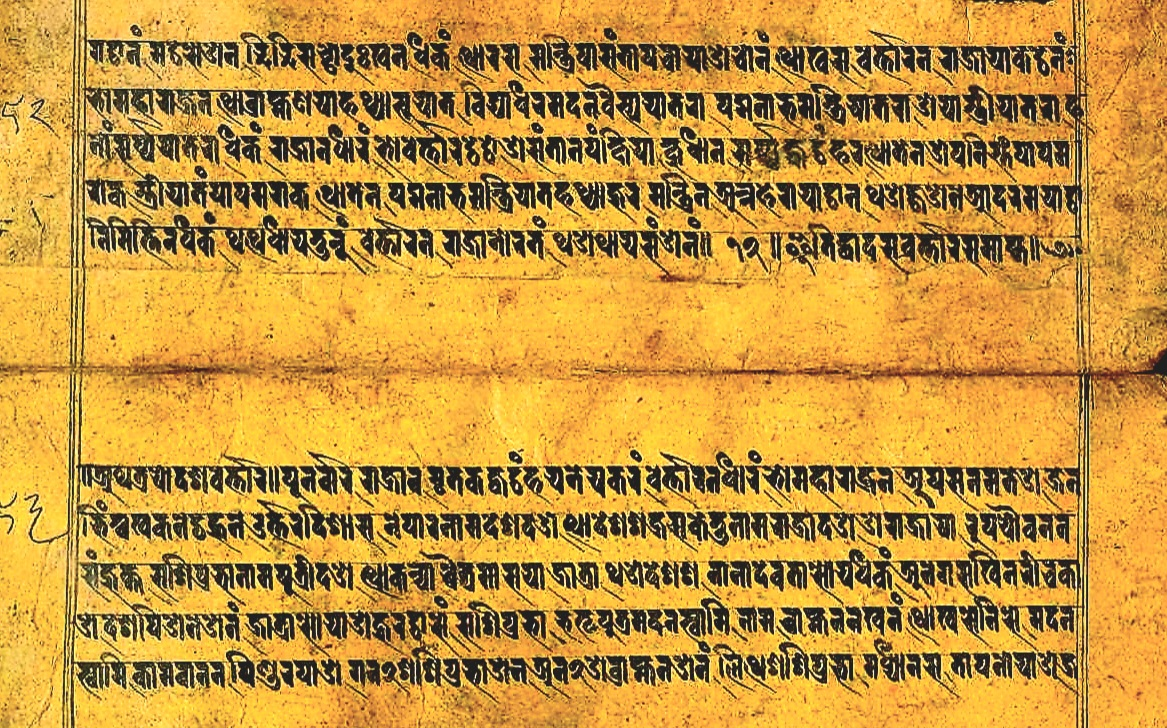
Newar language manuscript in the calligraphic Newar script from 1695 CE.

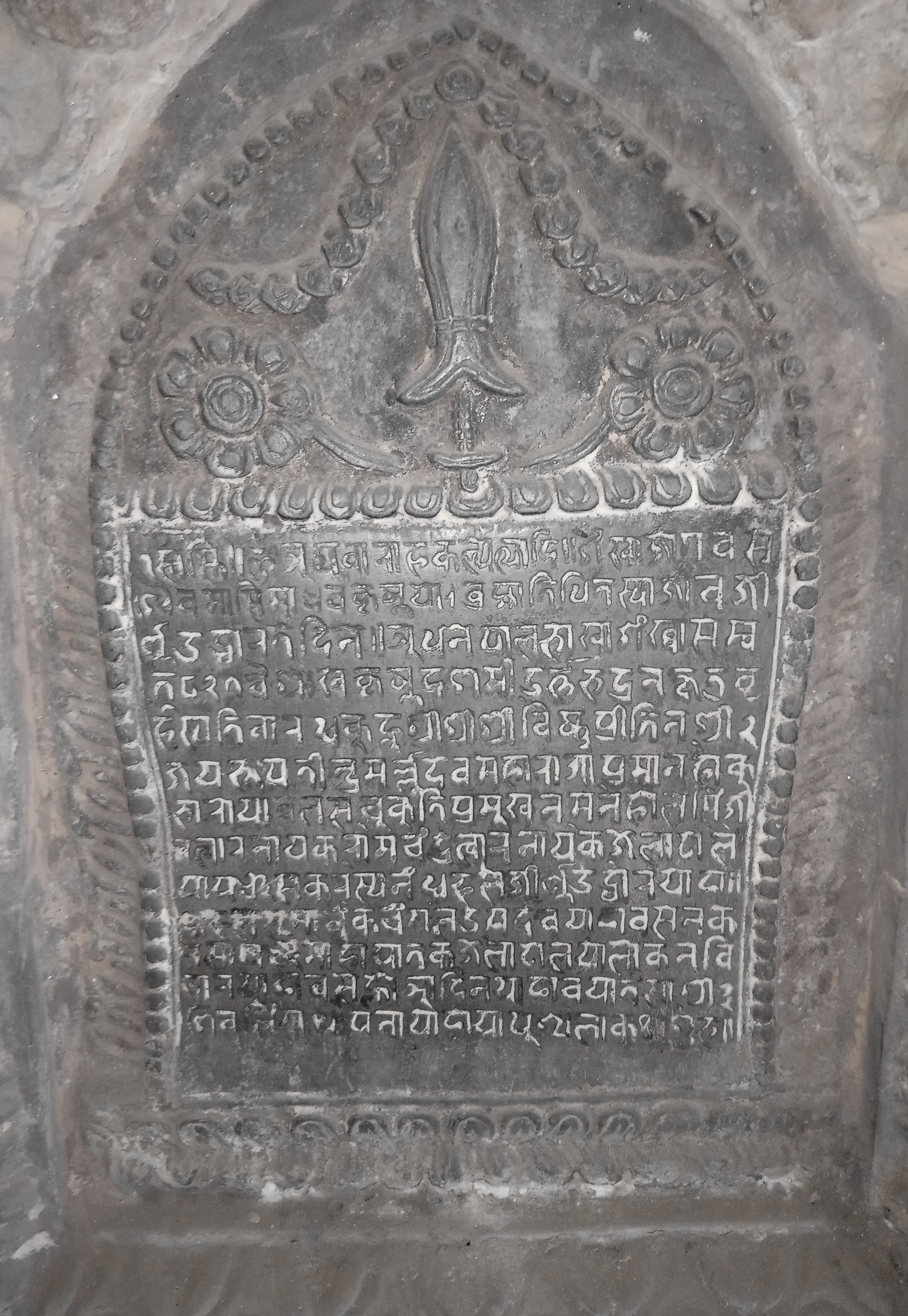
An inscription from Bhaktapur in the Newar script dated 1707 CE.

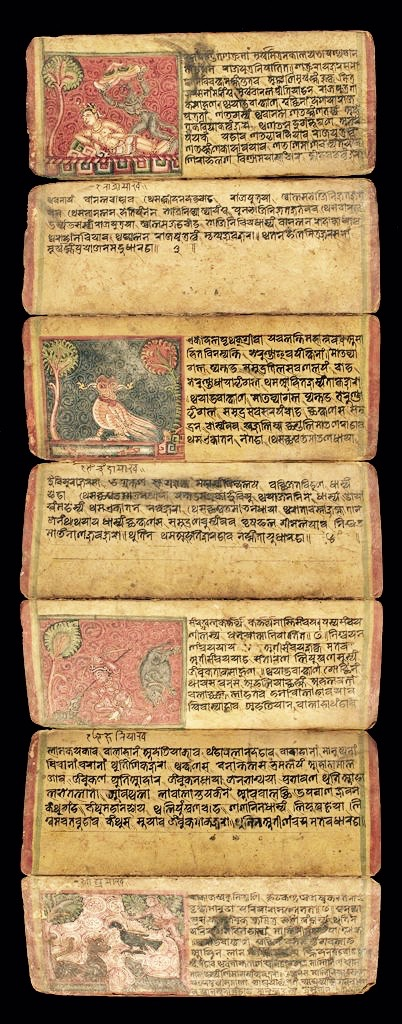
Manuscript of Hitopadesh, Newar script, 1800 CE.

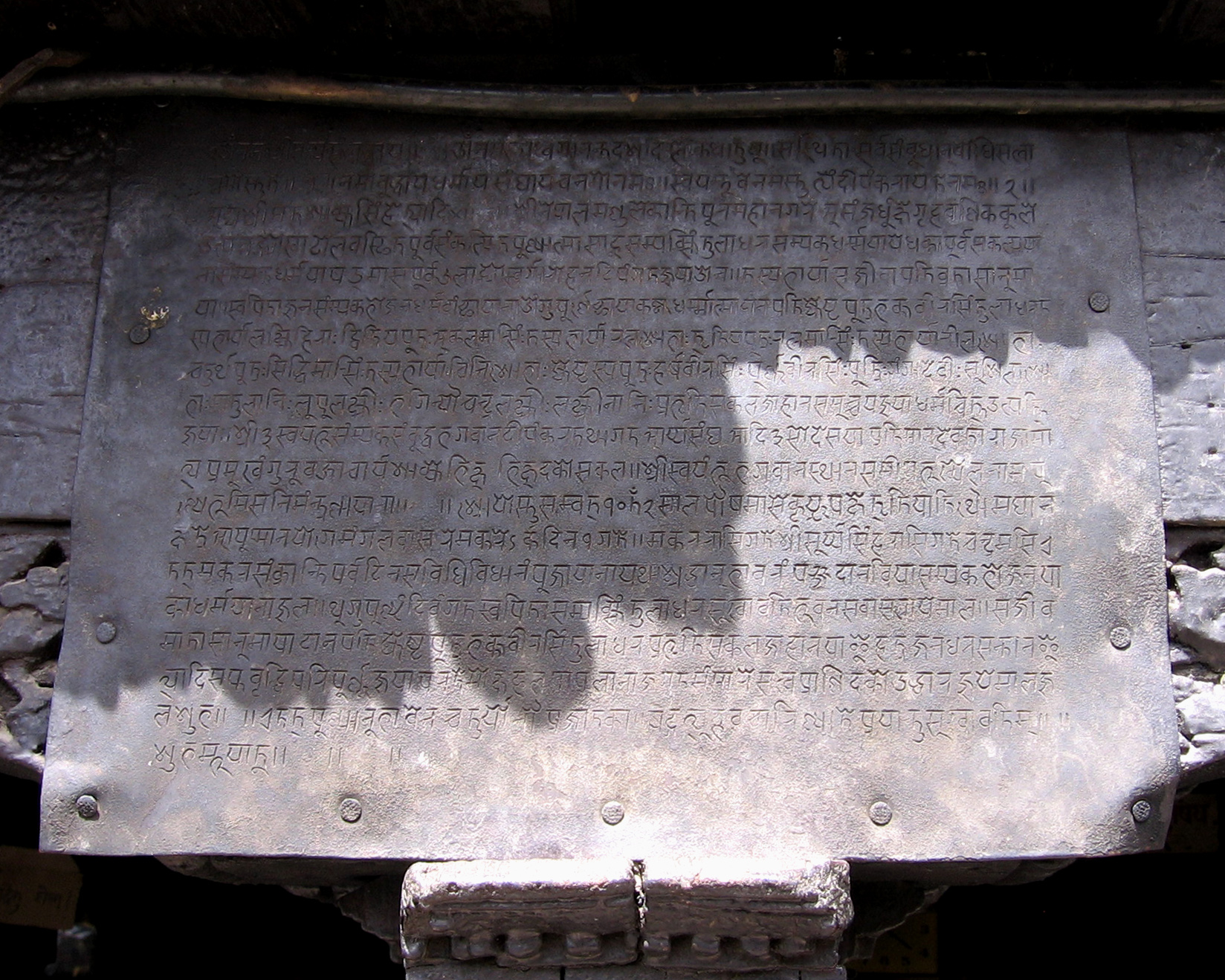
Copper inscription from 1952 CE.

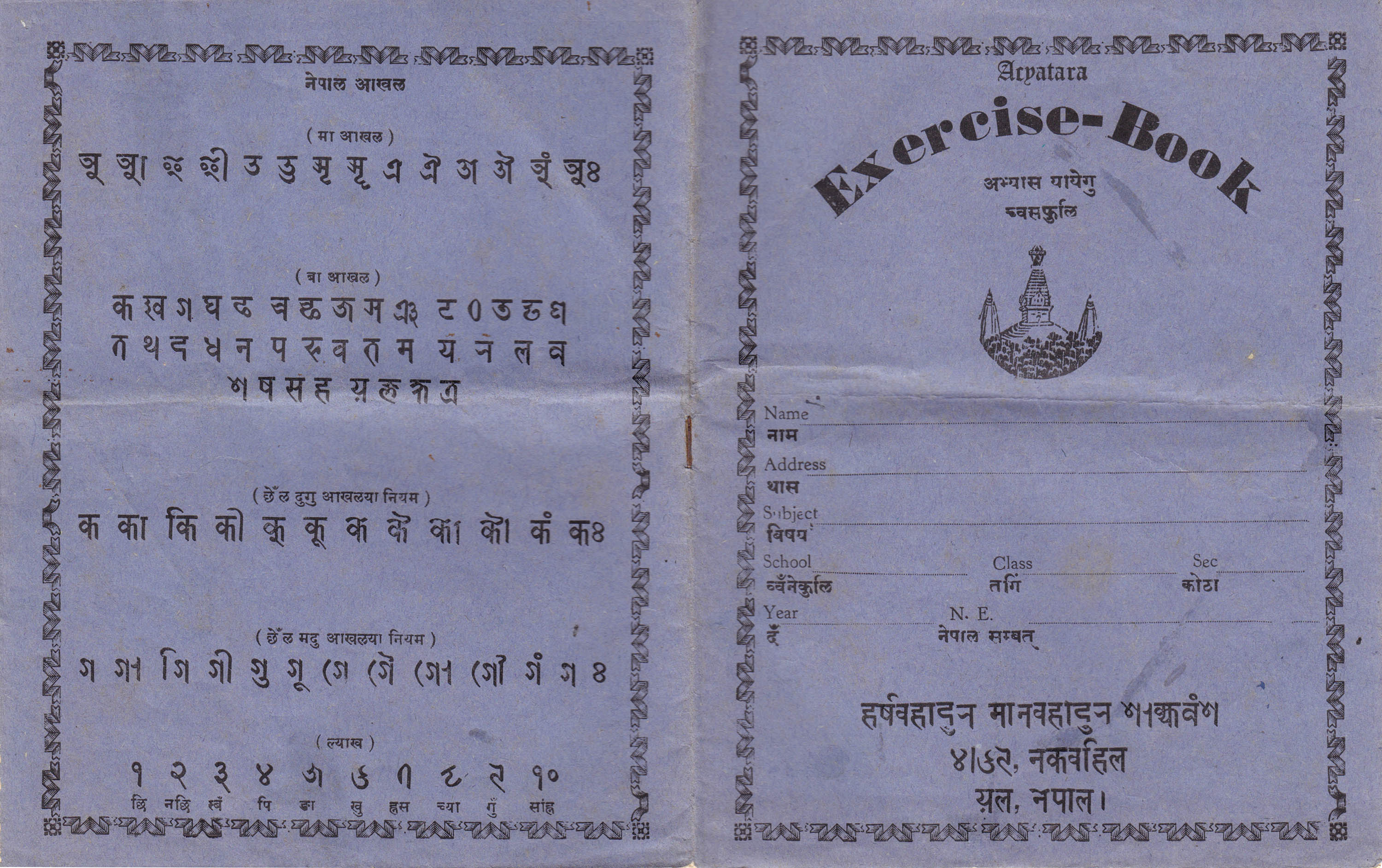
Table of Newar script.

== See also ==
- Nepal Bhasa literature
- Nepal Bhasa renaissance
