= Chronicles of Nepal =

Texts reflecting the distinct classical narrative in Nepal

There are bodies of texts that reflect distinct classical narrative in the Indian sub-continent are called the vamsavali (IAST: vaṃśāvalī, Devanagari: वंशावली). They bear special significance in the study of Nepalese history and its historical tradition. In continuation to the itihāsa-purāṇa tradition as prevalent in the Indian sub-continent, these writings have mostly been referred to, where there is an absence of other historical sources. As a distinct historical narrative, they have a lot to reflect about the past in a broader sense. In Nepal, such chronicles are abundant and historically important, but yet least researched. This sector is yet to be explored fully and is probable to mirror interesting and near-to-credible (or sometimes highly credible) information about the past.

The vaṃśāvalīs, etymologically, refer only to the list of people of certain vaṃśas (gotra or clan, ancestry in general).

== Popular chronicles (vamsavalis) of Nepal ==
List of some popular chronicles (vamsavalis) of Nepal
Name of Chronicle	Date of last compilation	Place of compilation	Paper Size	Folios	Script	Language
Gopālarājavaṃśāvalī	c. 1349 AD	Kathmandu valley (Bhaktapur)	28 cm x 5 cm	48	Bhujimol	Sanskrit and Nepal Bhasa
Nepālavaṃśāvalī	after 1790 AD	Kathmandu valley	22.5 cm x 9 cm	13	Devanagari	Sanskrit
Kirkpatrick's Chronicle	c. 1800 AD	Kathmandu valley	-	-	-	-
Wright's Chronicle	after 1847 AD	Kathmandu valley	-	-	Devanagari	Sanskrit and Nepal Bhasa
Bhāṣā Vaṃśāvalī	c. 1830–1880 AD	Kathmandu valley	-	-	Devanagari	Sanskrit and Nepali
Gorkhā Vaṃśāvalī	after 1774 AD	Gorkha	-	-	Devanagari	Nepali
Śrīpālī Vaṃśāvalī	1831 AD	Dailekh	-	-	Devanagari	Nepali
Kāṭhmāṇḍu Upatyakākā Ek Rājavaṃśāvalī	c. 1885 AD	Kathmandu valley	-	-	Devanagari	Sanskrit and Nepal Bhasa
The Vaṃśāvalī of the Malla Rājās of Jājarkoṭ	NA	Jajarkot	-	4	Devanagari	Nepali
Devatāharuko vaṃśāvalī	1988 AD	Kathmandu	33 cm x 22.5 cm	145	Devanagari	Sanskrit and Nepali

Alongside the list in the table, in the collection of Hodgson are following vaṃśāvalīs as specified by Hasrat: [The no./vol. refers to the codes in Hodgson collection.]

1. No. 27 (19): Bamshavalis, 5 books: Vol. 17. Fol. 1–117; Vol. 52, Fol. 180–1.
2. No. 28 (7): Chronology of Nepal, Vol. 17. Fol. 220–27.
3. No. 29 (8): Bamsavali, Newari, 2 Vols: Vol. 9, 16, 17 and 19.
4. No. 29 (16): Bamsavali, Newari, Vol. 52. Fol. 7-52; Vol. 102, Fol. 9–16.
5. No. 29 (1–6): Gorkha Bamsavali, Vol. 51. Fol. 49–1, 92–107; Vol. 55, Fol. 1–4.
6. No. 30 (1): Gorkha Bamsavali, Nepali and History of Nepal, Vol. 52, Fol. 57-
7. Vol. 74, Fol. 21–23; Vol. 101, Fol. 140–150.
8. No. 32 (1): Vamsavali etc. Vols. 50, 54, 56, 93, 95 and 104.
9. No. 32 (2): Vamsavali, Vol. 93. Fol. 89 ff; Vol. 101, Fol. 158–167.
10. No. 32 (5): Early Gorkha Vamsavalis, Vol. 51. Fol. 111–120.
11. No. 33(6): Gorkha Bamsavali, Roll No. 45.
12. No. 36 (1): Vamsavali Statistics etc., Vols. 26, 51, 54, 74, 99, 100 and 101.
13. No. 37 (5): Vamsavali, Vol. 51, Fol. 181–2.
14. No. 39 (6): Nepal Chronology, Vol. 7. Fol. 152–170.
15. No. 39 (1): Vamsavalis, Vols. 50 and 55.

Shreṣṭha (2012) mentions of 101 different vaṃśāvalī manuscripts preserved at National Archives, some of which are named after kings, gods, particular caste groups or places. Following is the list he provides:

1. Rājavogamālāvaṃśāvalī
2. Mukundasenanṛpavaṃśāvalī
3. Makavānapurīyananṛpavaṃśāvalī
4. Rājopādhyāyavaṃśāvalī
5. Maithilavaṃśāvalī
6. Maithilabrāhmaṇavaṃśāvalī
7. Macchendravaṃśāvalī
8. Nepālavaṃśāvalī
9. Nepālarājavaṃśāvalī
10. Gorkhāko Vaṃśāvalī
11. Rājaguruvaṃśāvalī
12. Munasigharānako Vaṃśāvalī
13. Rāmaśāhavaṃśāvalī
14. Bhāṣā Vaṃśāvalī
15. Sūryavaṃśāvalī
16. Harivaṃśāvalī
17. Śāhavaṃśāvalī

He also gives the main text of another vamsavali, viz. Harsiddhivaṃśāvalī. In the microfilm collections at Nepāl Archives under Nepal-German Manuscript Preservation Project, are also the vamsavalis collection, as published in a catalog (Part 2) under the subjects Itihāsa 1-5 Lagat (pp. 1–41) and Itihas Tādapatra (pp. 42–46), collected with the code, name of the vamsavali, film number, condition, script, number of folios, size, language and others.
