= Hara Prasad Shastri =

Indian Sanskrit scholar and archivist (1853–1931)

- Born: 6 December 1853; Khulna, Bengal Presidency, East India Company-administered India
- Died: 17 November 1931 (aged 77); Calcutta, Bengal Presidency, British India
- Education: Sanskrit College; Presidency College
- Occupations: Academic, Orientalist

Hara Prasad Shastri (Bengali: হরপ্রসাদ শাস্ত্রী; 6 December 1853 – 17 November 1931), also known as Hara Prasad Bhattacharya, was an Indian academic, Sanskrit scholar, archivist, and historian of Bengali literature. He is most known for discovering the Charyapada, the earliest known examples of Bengali literature.

== Early life ==
Hara Prasad Shastri was born in Kumira village in Khulna District, Bengal (now in Bangladesh) to a family that hailed from Naihati in North 24 Parganas of the present day West Bengal. The family name was Bhattacharya, a common Bengali Brahmin surname.

Shastri initially studied at the village school and then at Sanskrit College and Presidency College in Calcutta (now Kolkata). While in Calcutta, he stayed with the noted Bengali scholar and social reformer Ishwar Chandra Vidyasagar, who was a friend of Shastri's older brother, Nandakumar Nyayachunchu.

Shastri passed his entrance (school-leaving) examination in 1871, his First Arts (the undergraduate degree) in 1873, received a BA in 1876, and earned Honours in Sanskrit in 1877. He was conferred the title of Shastri when he received a MA degree. The Shastri title was awarded to those who secured a first class (highest grade) and he was the only student in his batch (class) to do so. He then joined Hare School as a teacher in 1878.

== Professional career ==
Shastri held numerous positions. He became a professor at the Sanskrit College in 1883. At the same time, he worked as an Assistant Translator with the Bengal government. Between 1886 and 1894, besides teaching at the Sanskrit College, he was the Librarian of the Bengal Library. In 1895, he headed the Sanskrit department at Presidency College.

During the winter 1898–99, he assisted Dr. Cecil Bendall during research in Nepal, collecting information from the private Durbar Library of the Rana Prime Minister Bir Shumsher Jung Bahadur Rana, and the total registration of manuscripts was later published as A Catalogue of Palm-Leaf and selected Paper Manuscripts belonging to the Durbar Library, Nepal (Calcutta 1905) with a historical introduction by Cecil Bendall (including the description of Gopal Raj Vamshavali).

He became Principal of Sanskrit College in 1900, leaving in 1908 to join the government's Bureau of Information. From 1921 to 1924, he was Professor and Head of the Department of Bengali and Sanskrit at Dhaka University.

Shastri held different positions within the Asiatic Society, and was its president for two years. He was also President of Bangiya Sahitya Parishad for twelve years and was an honorary member of the Royal Asiatic Society in London.

== Works ==
Shastri's first research article was "Bharat mahila", published in the periodical Bangadarshan when he was a student. Later, Shastri became a regular contributor to the periodical, which was then edited by the noted Bengali author Bankimchandra Chattopadhyay, authoring around thirty articles on different topics, as well as novel reviews. He was first introduced to research by Rajendralal Mitra, a noted Indologist. Due to his ailing health, Mitra asked him for help working on The Sanskrit Buddhist Literature of Nepal, where Shastri translated descriptions of manuscripts — written by paṇḍits in Sanskrit — into English. Shastri was also Mitra's assistant at the Asiatic Society, and became Director of Operations in Search of Sanskrit Manuscripts after Mitra's death, continuing his work on the Notices of Sanskrit MSS beginning with volume X.

Shastri was instrumental in preparing the Catalogue of the Asiatic Society's approximately ten thousand manuscripts with the assistance of a few others. The long introduction to the Catalogue contains invaluable information on the history of Sanskrit literature.

Shastri gradually became interested in collecting old Bengali manuscripts and ended up visiting Nepal several times, where, in 1907, he discovered the Charyageeti or Charyapada manuscripts. His painstaking research on the manuscript led to the establishment of Charyapada as the earliest known evidence of Bengali language. Shastri wrote about this finding in a 1916 paper titled "হাজার বছরের পুরোনো বাংলা ভাষায় রচিত বৌদ্ধ গান ও দোঁহা” (Hajar bochhorer purono Bangla bhasay rochito Bouddho gan o doha) meaning "Buddhist songs and verses written in Bengali a thousand years ago".

Shastri was the collector and publisher of many other old works, author of many research articles, a noted historiographer, and recipient of a number of awards and titles.

Some of his notable works were: Balmikir jai, Meghdoot byakshya, Beneyer Meye (The Merchant's Daughter, a novel), Kancanmala (novel), Sachitra Ramayan, Prachin Banglar Gourab, and Bouddha dharma.

His English works include: Magadhan Literature, Sanskrit Culture in Modern India, and Discovery of Living Buddhism in Bengal.

He also discovered an old palm-leaf manuscript of Skanda Purana in a Kathmandu library in Nepal, written in Gupta script.
