= Classical Newar =

Early form of Newar language

Classical Nepal Bhasa
- Old Newar
- 𑐥𑐸𑐮𑐵𑐒𑑂𑐐𑐸 𑐣𑐾𑐥𑐵𑐮 𑐨𑐵𑐲𑐵 𑖢𑖲𑖩𑖯𑖒𑖿𑖐𑖲 𑖡𑖸𑖢𑖯𑖩 𑖥𑖯𑖬𑖯
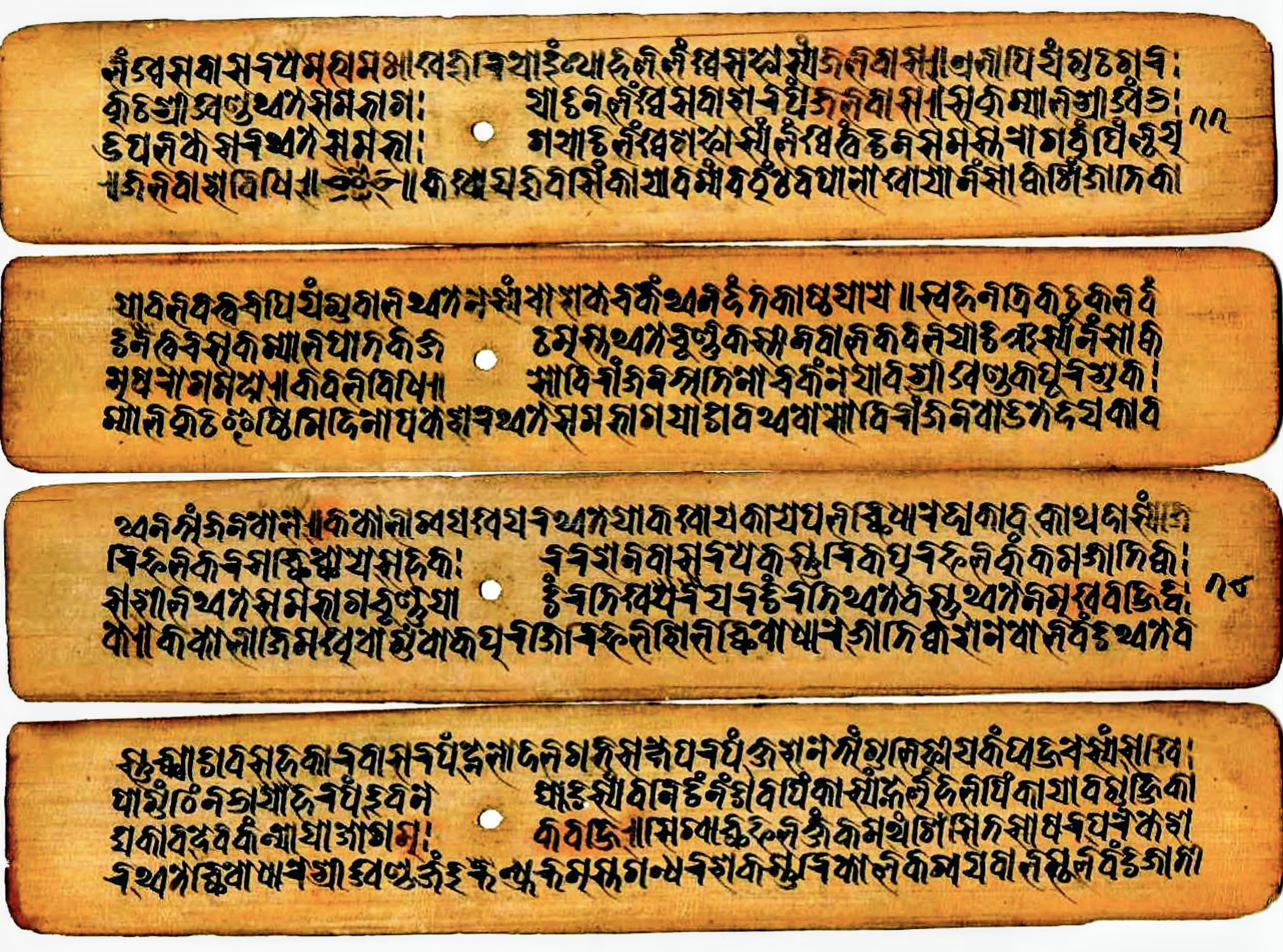
- A 14th century palm-leaf manuscript of a medical manual written in Classical Newar and the Bhujimola script.
- Native to: Nepal
- Region: Nepal Mandala
- Era: Developed into Modern Nepal Bhasa in the 19th century
- Language family: Sino-Tibetan: Newaric; Classical Nepal Bhasa
- Early forms: Proto-Sino-Tibetan: Proto-Tibeto-Burman (?); Proto-Newar
- Writing system: Bhujimol script; Newar script; Kutila script; Ranjana script; various Nepalese scripts

Language codes
- ISO 639-2: nwc
- ISO 639-3: nwc
- Glottolog: None

Classical Newar or Classical Nepal Bhasa (Modern Newar: pulāṃ bhāy, 'old language') also known as Old Newar, is the vernacular and literary form of Nepal Bhasa used prior to the 19th century. The term is most generally used to describe the form of Nepal Bhasa used in manuscripts and other sources from the Malla dynasty.

The antiquity of the Newar language is not known. The Sanskrit stone inscriptions from the Licchavi Dynasty contains frequent use of Sino-Tibetan words, especially for proper nouns like names of person, settlements and rivers, suggesting the existence of a vernacular Sino-Tibetan language which is believed to be an early form of the Newar language. Classical Newar language was the official language and lingua franca of Nepal Mandala during the Malla period.

== History ==
=== Licchavi period ===
Newar words appeared in Sanskrit inscriptions in the Kathmandu Valley for the first time in the fifth century. The words are names of places, taxes and merchandise indicating that it already existed as a spoken language during the Licchavi period (400–879 CE).

=== Medieval period ===
The earliest known (dated) document in Nepal Bhasa is called "The Palmleaf from Uku Bahal" which dates back to 1114 CE (235 NS). The earliest dated stone inscription in Thakuri dynasty is in Newar, dated Nepal Sambat 293 (1173 CE).

The earliest important books of Classical Newar from the 14th century are Haramekhalā (1374), Mānava Nyāyaśāstra (1380), Amarkośa (1381), and Gopālarāja Vaṃśāvalī (1389). The language continued growing in the Medieval period and enjoyed royal patronage. Some noted royal writers include Mahindra Malla, Siddhi Narasimha Malla, Jagatprakash Malla and Pratap Malla.

== Grammar ==
=== Noun cases ===
Classical Newar has six cases and they are differentiated based on whether the term in question is animate or inanimate. The following charts provide case endings that can be affixed on the end of nouns, pronouns, and adjectives in IAST transliteration for Classical Newar.

Noun Case Endings in Classical Newar
	Inanimate	Animate/non-honorific		Animate/honorific	
Case	Singular	Singular	Plural	Singular	Plural
Instrumental/Ergative	-n	-n	-taseṃ	-n, -seṃ	-paniseṃ
Absolutive	-ø	-ø	-ta, -to	-ø	-pani
Sociative	-va	-va	-mis(a)va	-va	-panis(a)va
Dative	-taṃ, -yātā	-taṃ, -yātaṃ	-mistaṃ	-yātaṃ	-panistaṃ
Genitive	-yā	-yā	-tas, -mis	-yā	-panis
Locative	-s	-(s)ke, -yāke	X	-(s)ke, -yāke	-paniske

== ISO ==
Classical Nepal Bhasa was introduced in ISO 639-2 code list in 2004.

== See also ==
- Newar language
- Nepalese scripts
