= Bhujimol script =

Historical script of the Newar language

Bhujimol
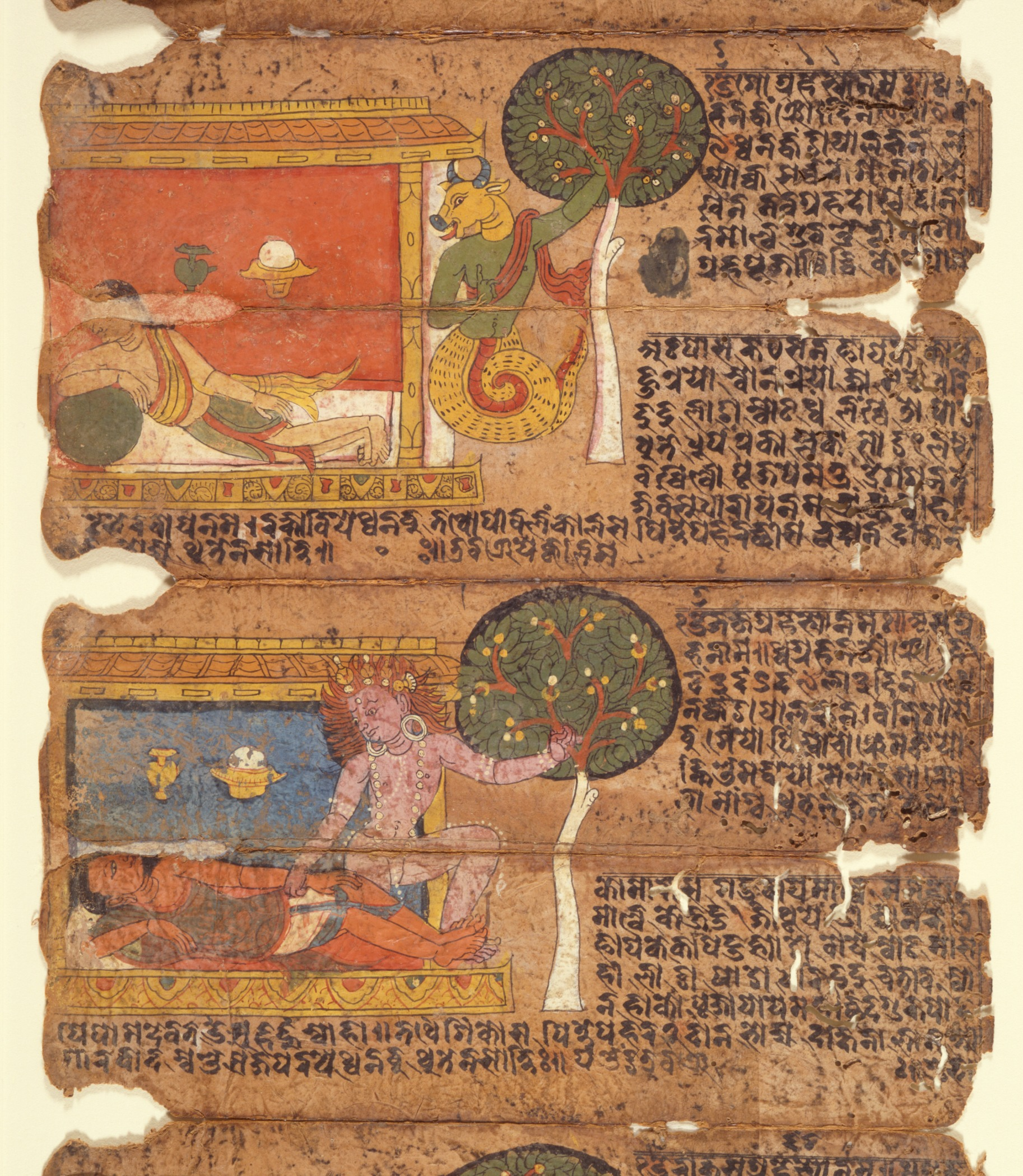
- A folio from a Book of Charms written in Classical Newar and the Bhujimol script from the 16th century.
- Script type: Abugida
- Direction: Left-to-right
- Languages: Newar, Sanskrit

Related scripts
- Parent systems: Proto-Sinaitic script: Phoenician alphabet; Aramaic script; Brāhmī; Gupta; Siddham; Gaudi; Nepalese; Bhujimol
- Sister systems: Newar; Ranjana

The Bhujimol script (Newar: 𑐨𑐸𑐖𑐶𑐩𑑀𑐮), or Bhujinmol (𑐨𑐸𑐖𑐶𑑄𑐩𑑀𑐮), is the most ancient form of Nepal script. It is also one of the most common varieties of the Nepal alphabet. The Bhujimol script has been used to write Newar language and Sanskrit.

== Etymology ==
The word Bhujimol comes from Newar language, where Bhujin or Bhojini means housefly and Mol means head. The "head" of this script, instead of being a horizontal line above each letter, resembles the forewing of a housefly, hence it is called Bhujimol, meaning "housefly-headed script."

== History ==
The Bhujimol script first appeared in King Nirbhayadeva's inscription at Taumadhi, Bhaktapur, dated to 1005 CE. The earliest important Newar texts, Haramekhala (1374), Manava Nyaya Shastra (1380), and Gopal Raj Vamshavali (1389), are written in the Bhujimol script.

In 2003, a brick was discovered in Chabahil, in the course of reconstruction of the Chabahil Stupa or Dhando Chaitya, bearing inscriptions in both Brahmi and Bhujimol: The upper face is inscribed with Cha Ru Wa Ti in Brahmi, and with Cha Ru Wa Ti Dhande / He Tu Pra Bha in Bhujimol script. There are Swastika marks at the two ends of the upper face with a Chakra mark in between. The brick measures 35.5 cm x 23 cm x 7 cm and weighs 8.6 kg. The brick may date to as early as the 3rd century BC. The inscription is interpreted to refer to Charumati, a daughter of emperor Ashoka.

== Gallery ==
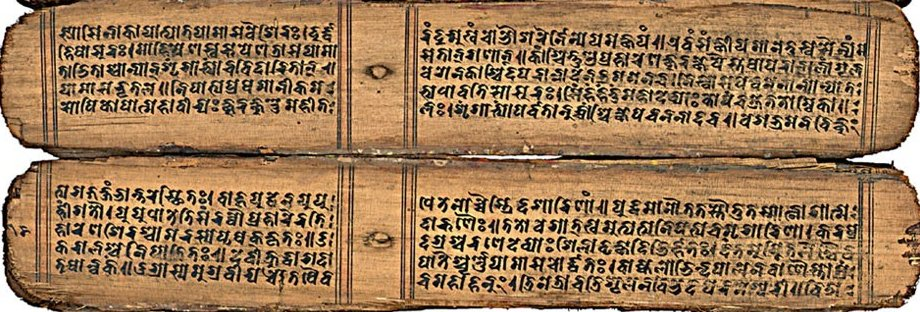
A palm-leaf MS of the Devimahatmya, Nepal, 11th century.

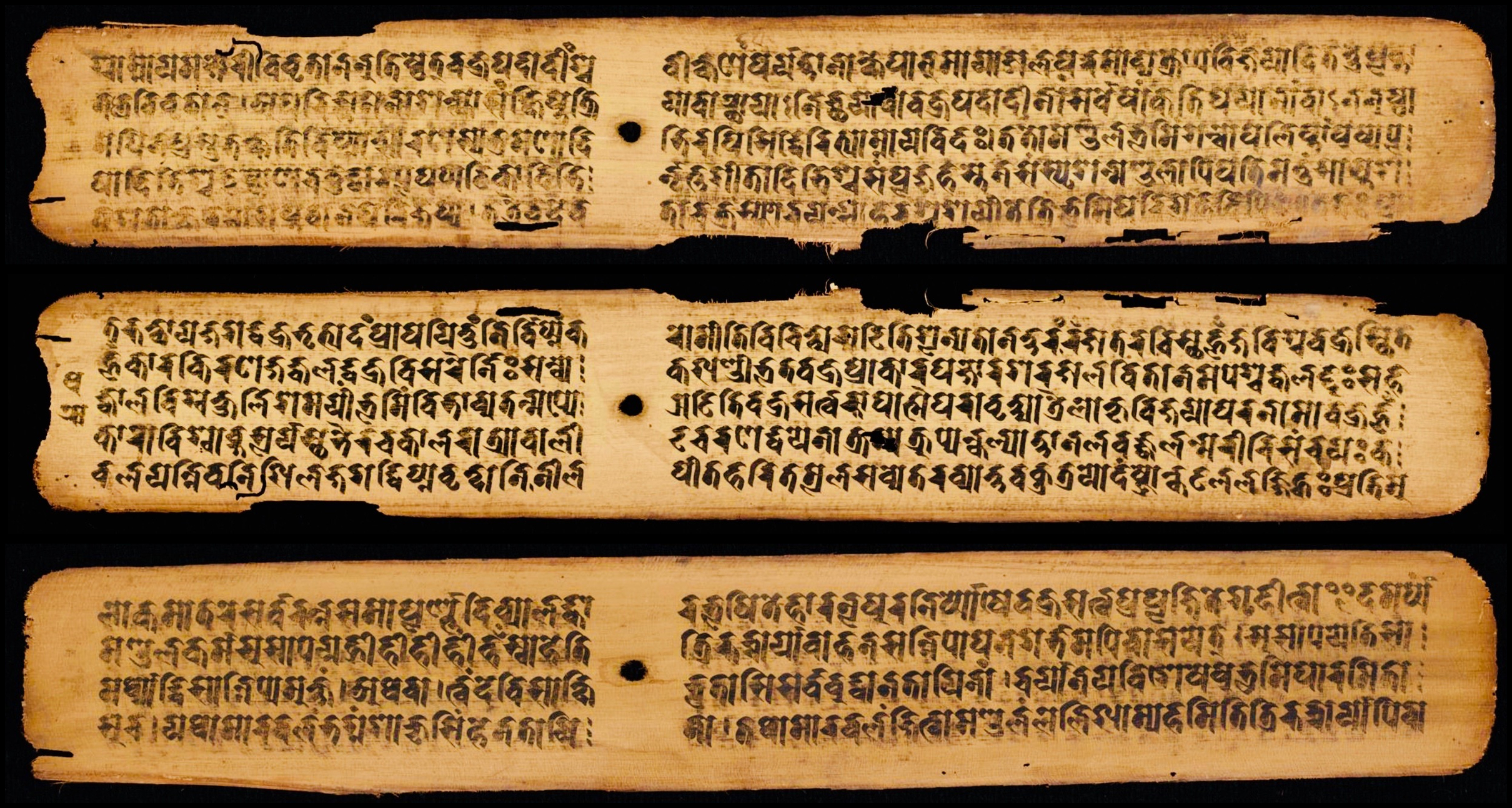
A Buddhist tantric manuscript from Nepal, 12th century.

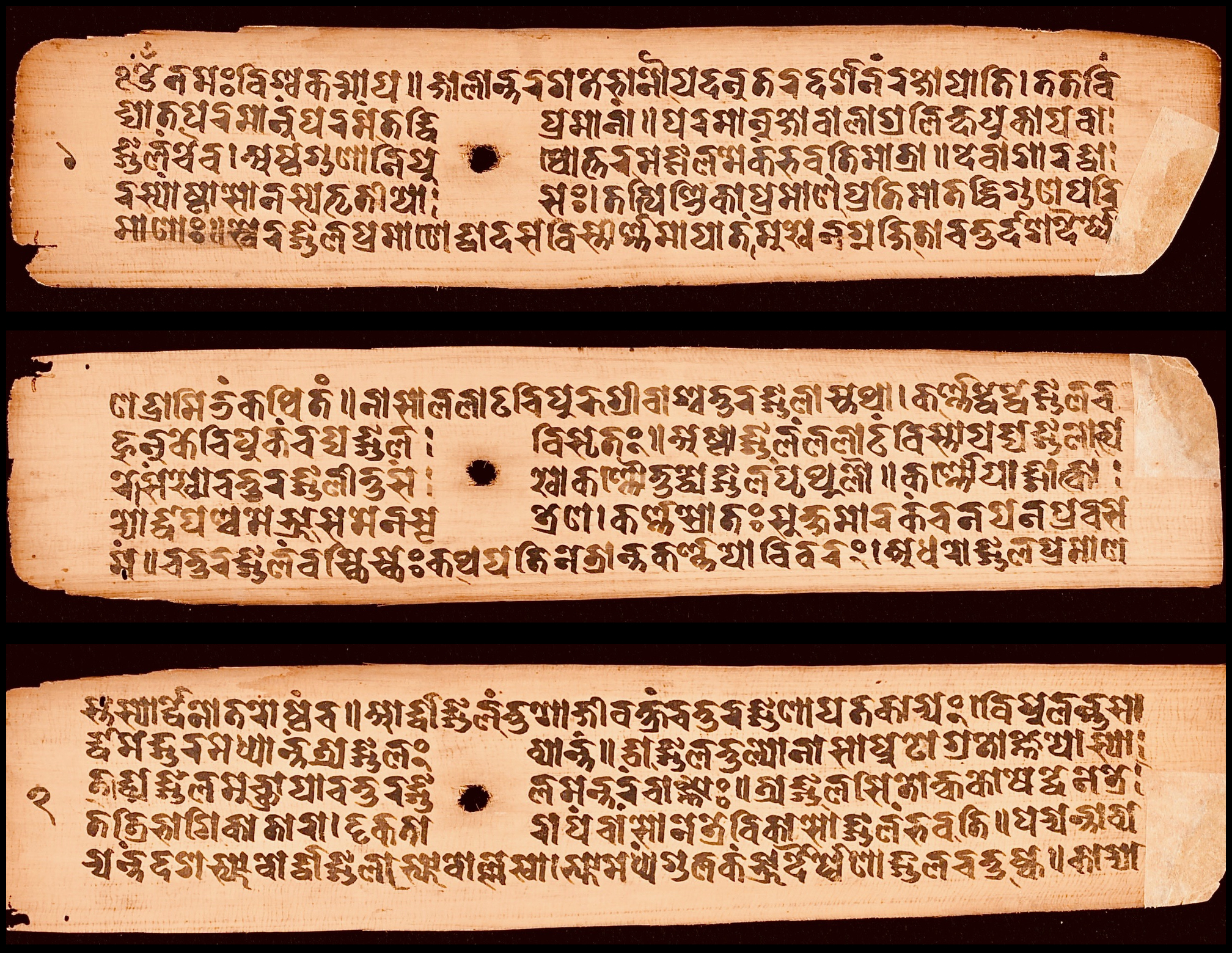
Palm-leaf MS of Hindu text Pratimā-lakṣaṇa from 1279 CE.

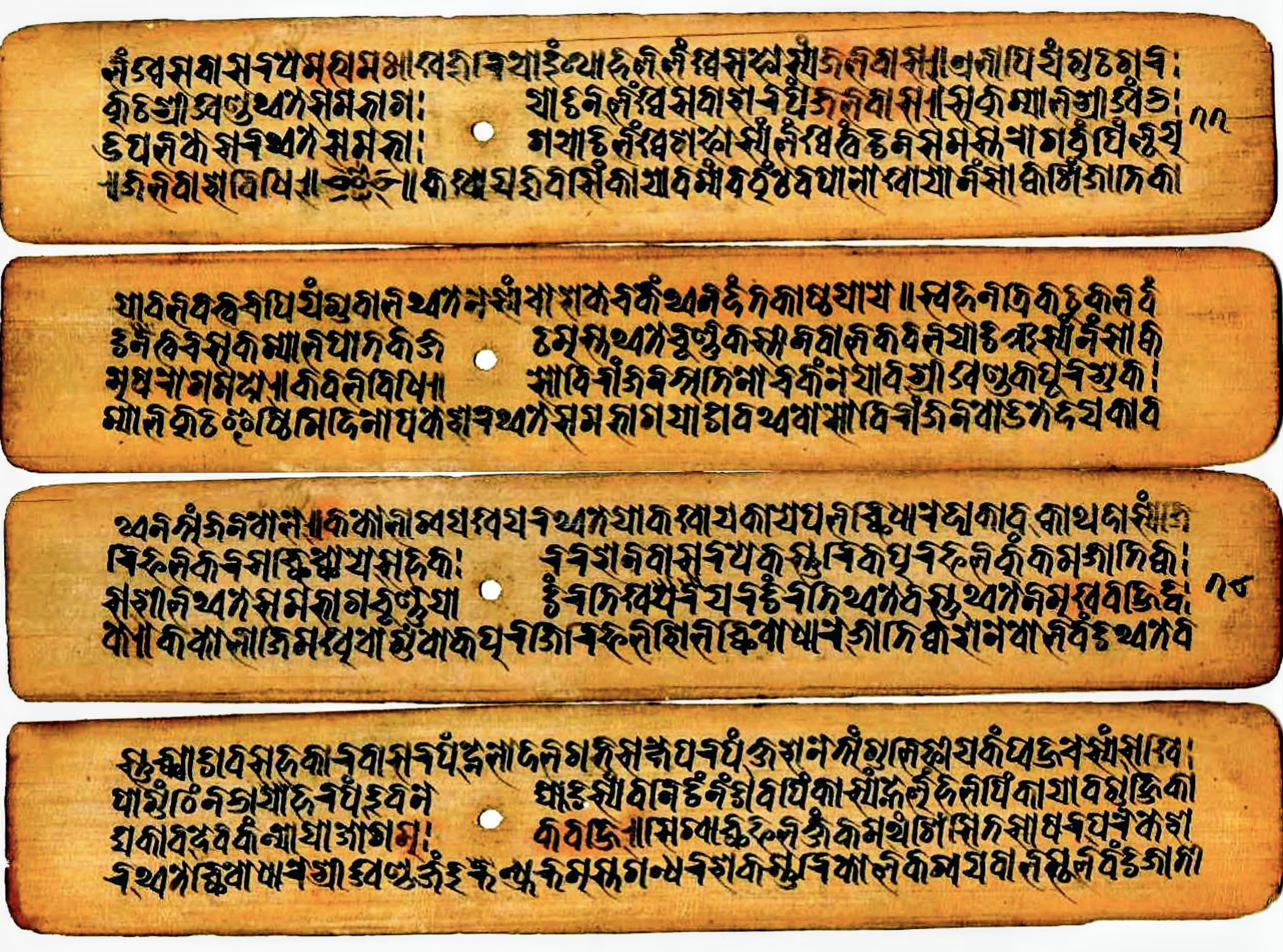
A manuscript of medical manual, Newar language and the Bhujimol script, 1374 CE.

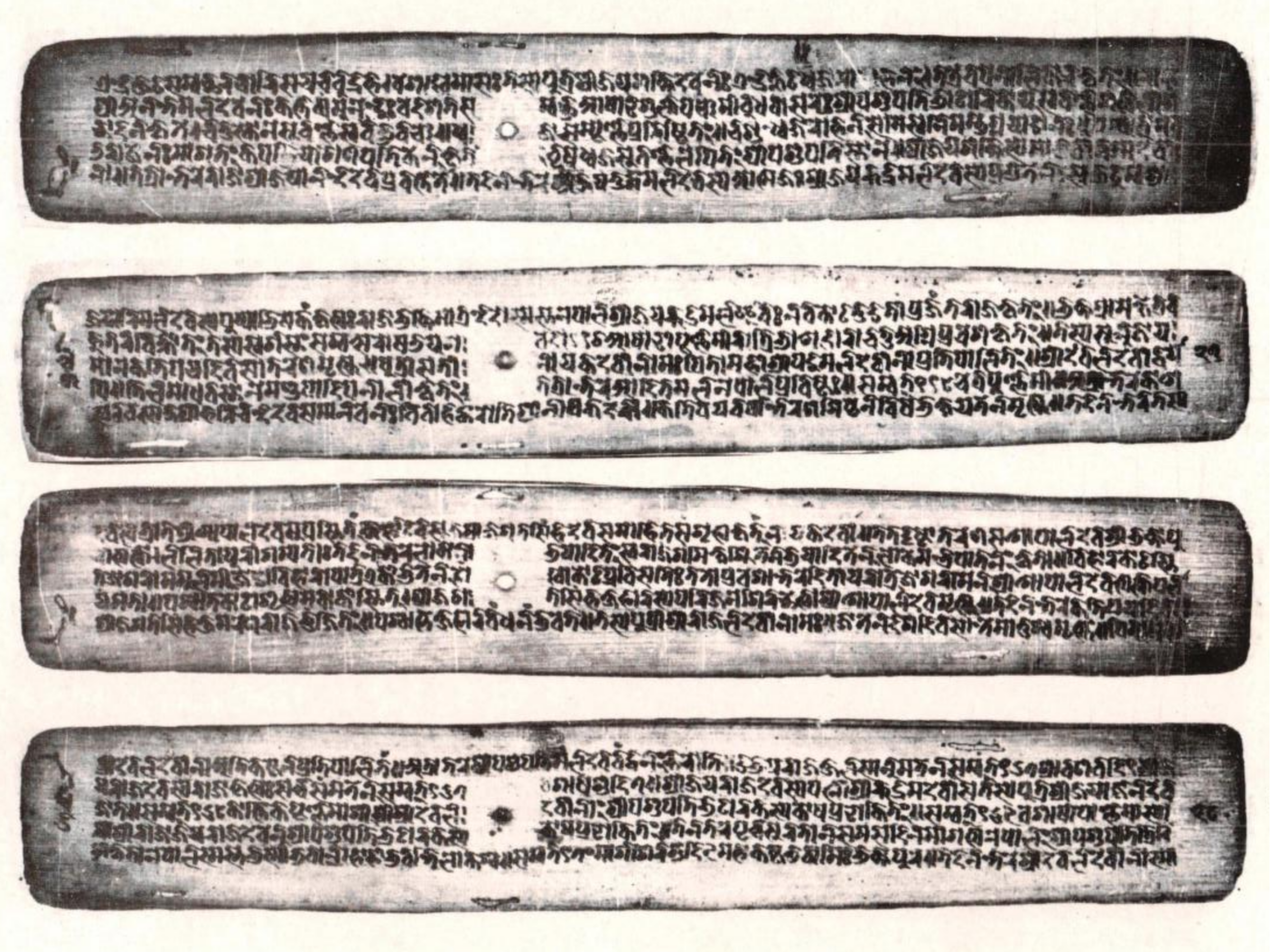
Folio from the Gopālarāja Vaṃśāvalī, a Newar historical chronicle written in 1389.

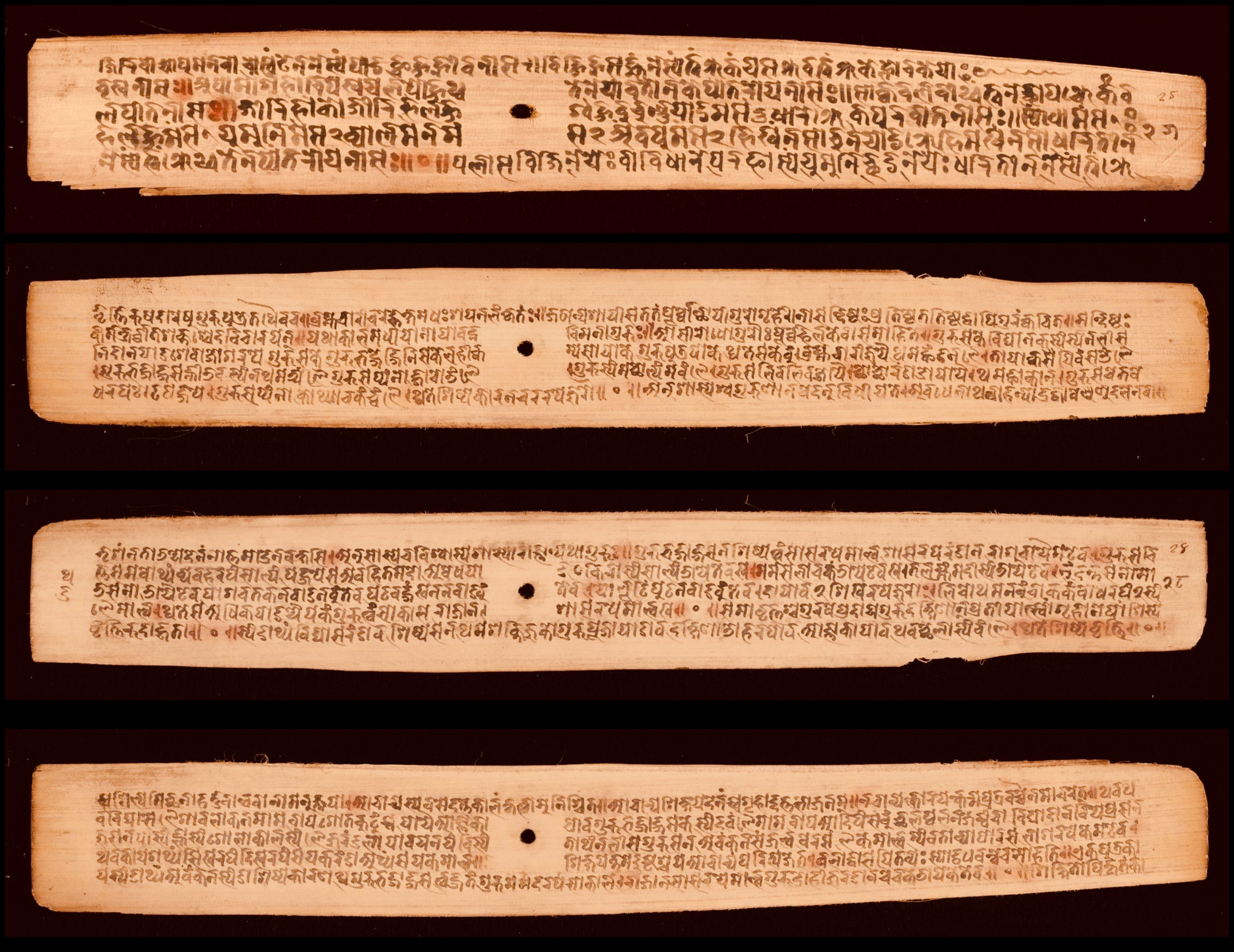
Manuscript of the Nāradasmṛti, Hindu law text, Sanskrit language, 1407 CE.

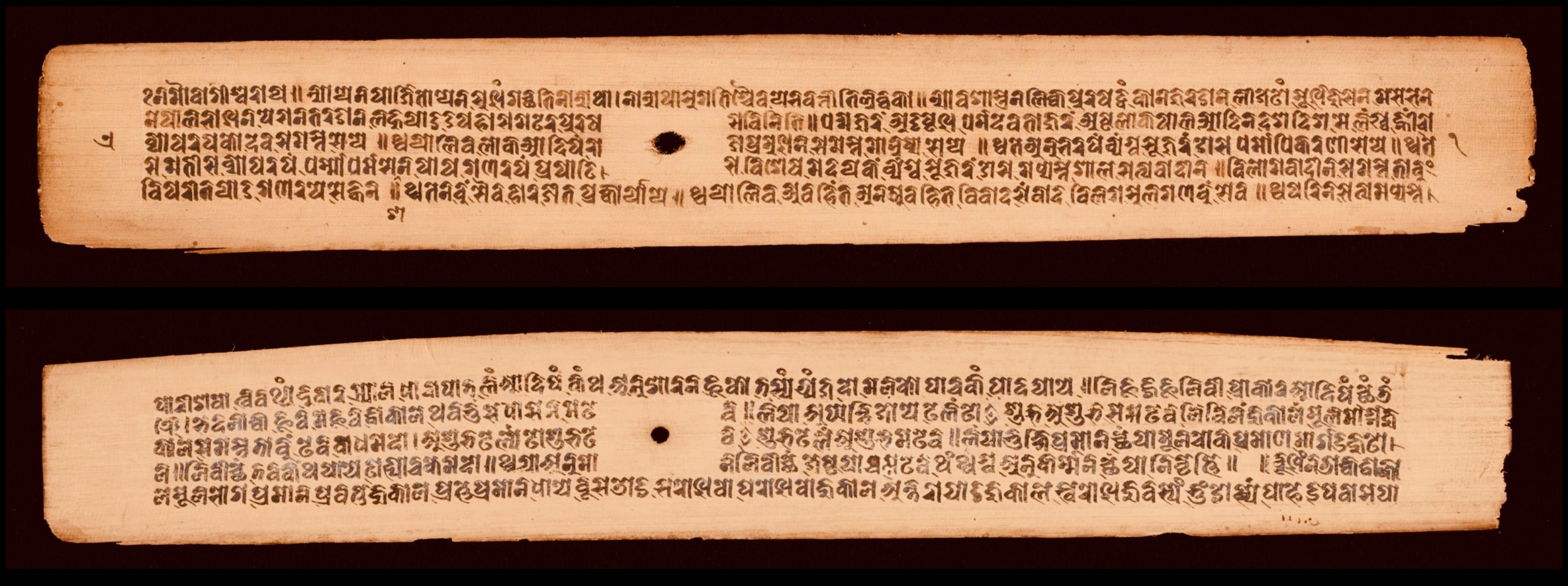
Palm-leaf MS of the Mānava-nyāya-śāstra, Newar language and Bhujimol script, 1407 CE.

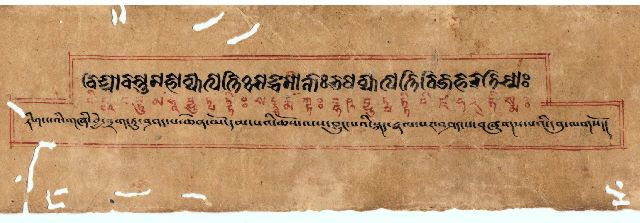
Title of Mahavyutpatti written in Bhujimol script (top), Tibet.

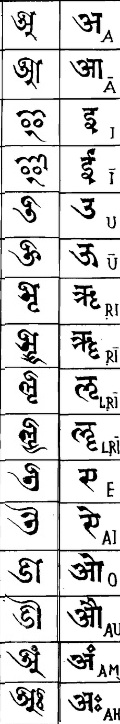
Chart of Bhujimol script vowel letters, with Devanagari and Latin correspondences.

== See also ==
- Nepalese scripts
- Newar script
