= Gaudi script =

Writing system in the Brahmic family

Gaudi script Proto-BAMO script
- Script type: Abugida
- Period: 10th - 14th centuries CE
- Direction: Left-to-right

Related scripts
- Parent systems: Proto-Sinaitic alphabet^{[a]}: Phoenician alphabet^{[a]}; Aramaic alphabet^{[a]}; Brahmi; Gupta; Siddham; Gaudi script
- Child systems: Bengali-Assamese script, Tirhuta, Odia, Nepalese
- Sister systems: Kamarupi script, Nagari
- [a] The Semitic origin of the Brahmic scripts is not universally agreed upon.

The Gaudi script (Gāuṛi lipi) or Proto-BAMO script (Note: In some contexts, also known as the Proto-Assamese script, the Proto-Bengali script, or Proto-Oriya script; Sureshchandra Bhattacharya suggested the extended Proto-BAMO script in 1969, the full form of which is Proto-Bengali-Assamese-Maithili-Odia script. The script has also been called the "old Eastern script".) is an abugida in the Brahmic family of scripts. By the fourteenth century, Gaudi script had begun to differentiate and gradually developed into the Bengali-Assamese, Odia, (Note: The Oriya script actually appears to have had a composite origin, with secondary influences from the southern scripts and Nagari.) Maithili and Nepalese scripts.

== Naming issues ==
The Gaudi script is named after the Gauda Kingdom (Gāuṛ Rājya) of Gauḍa (region) in ancient Bengal. In 1030 AD, the Persian scholar Al-Biruni, in his writings on India, mentioned the ancient Gaudi script of Eastern India. Medieval Gauḍa (region) is currently known as Bengal (region).

However the script was not limited to the Gauda or ancient Bengal. It was also used in Assam, Bihar, Odisha, Jharkhand, neighbouring parts of Nepal and Rakhine in Myanmar. The script is called by different names in different regions such as Proto-Assamese, Proto-Bengali, Proto-Maithili, Proto-Oriya in modern times, which is why Sureshchandra Bhattacharyya suggested neutral acronyms Proto-BAM and Proto-BAMO. Bhattacharya also argued that Al-Biruni didn't have a first-hand acquaintance with eastern India, therefore his account may not truly reflect whether and/or how far the term "Gauḍiya" was in actual usage in different regions of eastern India. The script has also been called the "old Eastern script". In Daṇḍin's 7th-century Kavyadarsha, the Sanskrit literary style prevalent throughout eastern India is called the Gauḍa style, as it is thought that poets from other regions of eastern India imitated the literary style of the poets of the Gauda court. Thus, the name Gauḍa generally came to be applied to the whole of Eastern India. The script prevalent in this region was also named the Gauḍi script, like the literary style, after Gauḍa in ancient times.

== History ==
The scripts of eastern North India developed through the regional evolution of the northern Brāhmī tradition during and after the Gupta period, from the fourth through sixth centuries A.D. The Gupta script represented an important stage in the development of northern Indian scripts, with regional variations becoming increasingly pronounced in the post-Gupta period. By the latter part of the sixth century and during the seventh century, these developments produced an increasingly angular form conventionally known as Kutila, also called Siddhamātṛkā.

A significant transformation occurred in the northeastern form of the alphabet during the latter half of the seventh century. Radhakrishna Choudhary states that this transformation is first evident in the inscriptions of the Later Gupta king Ādityasena. Choudhary states that the inscriptions of Ādityasena is an important specimen in the development of the northeastern script. Fleet classified the characters of the Aphsad inscription as the “Kutila variety” of the Magadha alphabet of the seventh century. The subsequent development was gradual. Bhattacharyya distinguishes an early phase of Kutila dating from approximately 600–800 CE, a further development of the Kutila style during approximately 800–900, and a transition from Kutila to varied eastern styles during approximately 900–1000. The stage of the script which we would call Gaudi, was current from the tenth to the fourteenth centuries. In the 11th century, famous Persian scholar Al-Biruni wrote about the ancient Gaudi script. He mentioned amongst Indian alphabets, Gaudi is used in the purva desa (Eastern County).

The modern eastern scripts (Bengali-Assamese, Odia, and Maithili) became clearly differentiated around the 14th and 15th centuries from Gaudi. While the scripts in Bengal, Assam and Mithila remained similar to each other, the Odia script developed a curved top in the 13th-14th century and became increasingly different. Evidenced by inscriptions, the early Maithili and Oriya scripts were very similar up until the 15th century.

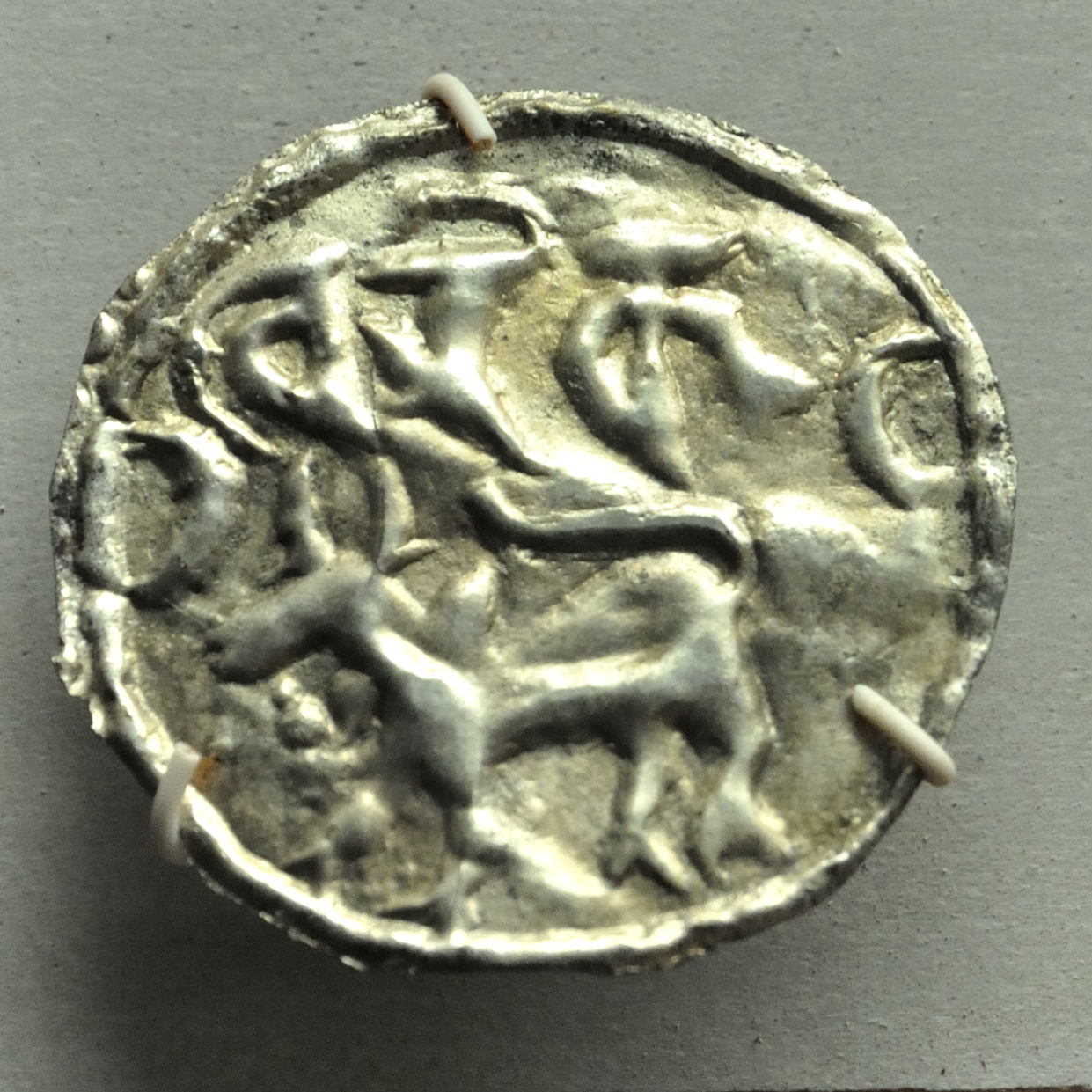
Silver coin with Gaudi script, Harikela Kingdom, circa 9th–13th century

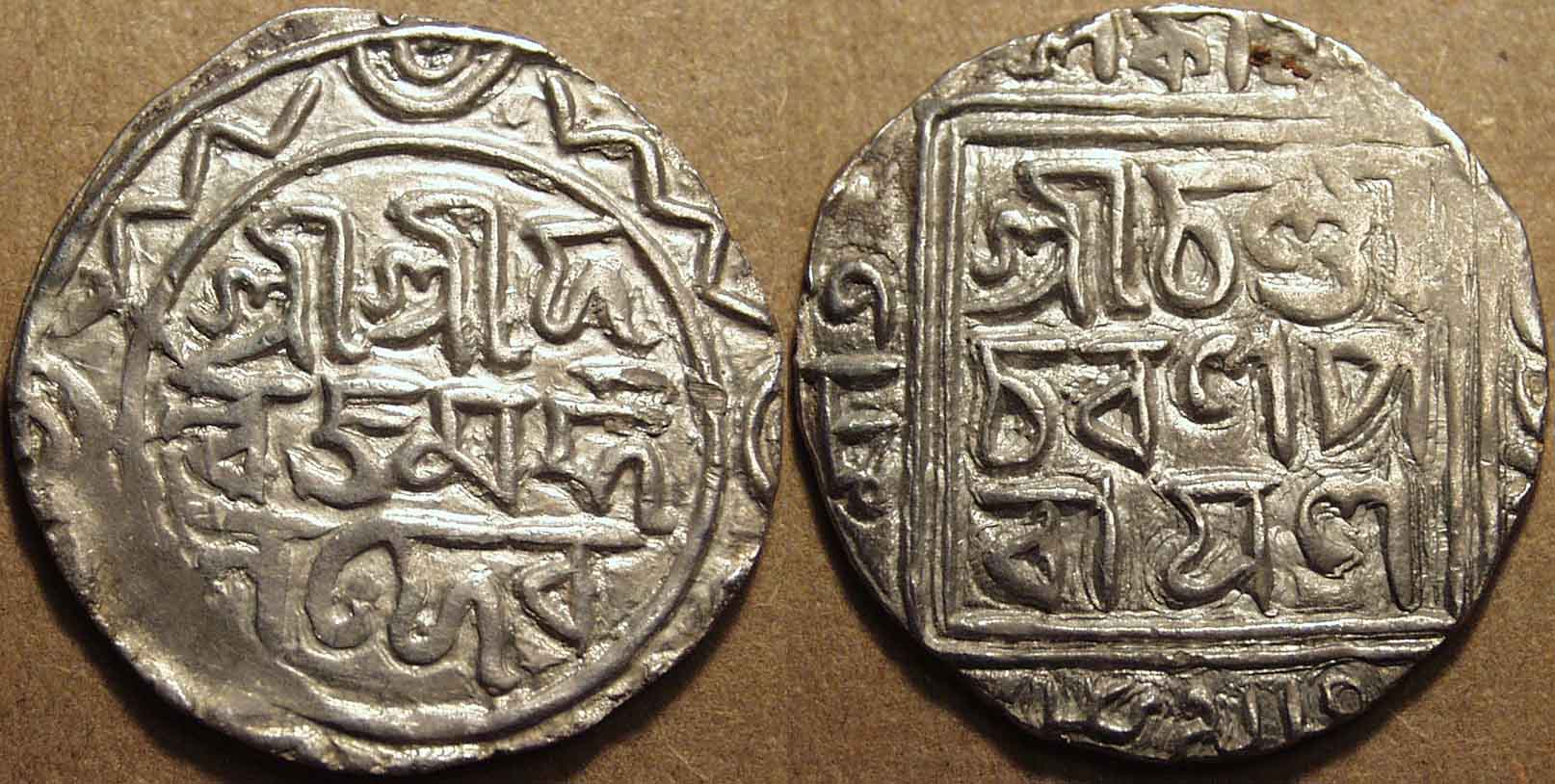
Silver Coin of Danujmarddana, 1417

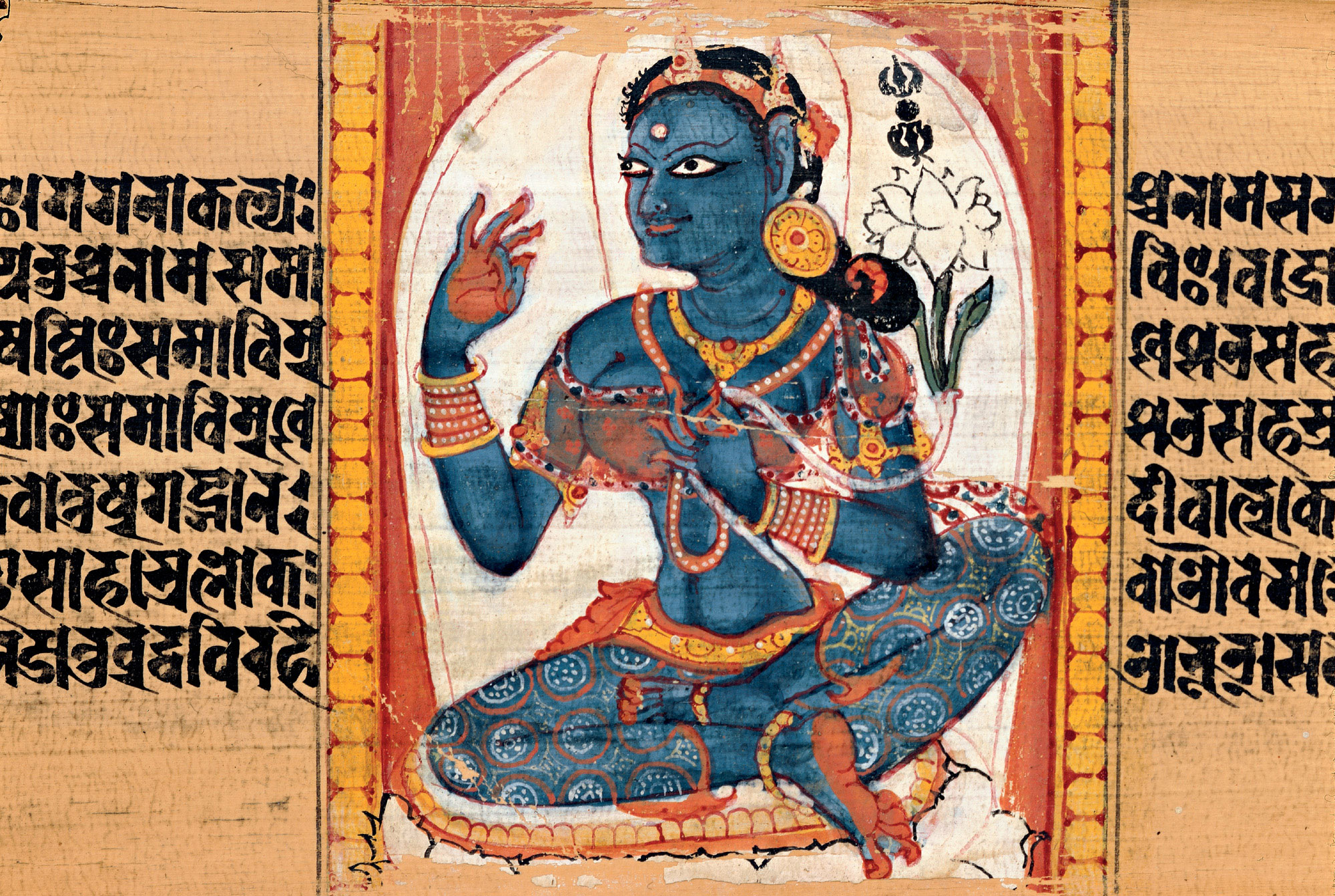
Aṣṭasāhasrikā Prajñāpāramitā Manuscript. Ink on palm-leaves. Gauḍīya script

== See also ==
- Gauda Kingdom
- Gauḍa (region)
- Brahmi script
- Brahmic scripts
- Siddhaṃ script
- Eastern Nagari
