= Nāradasmṛti =

Dharmaśāstra text from ancient India

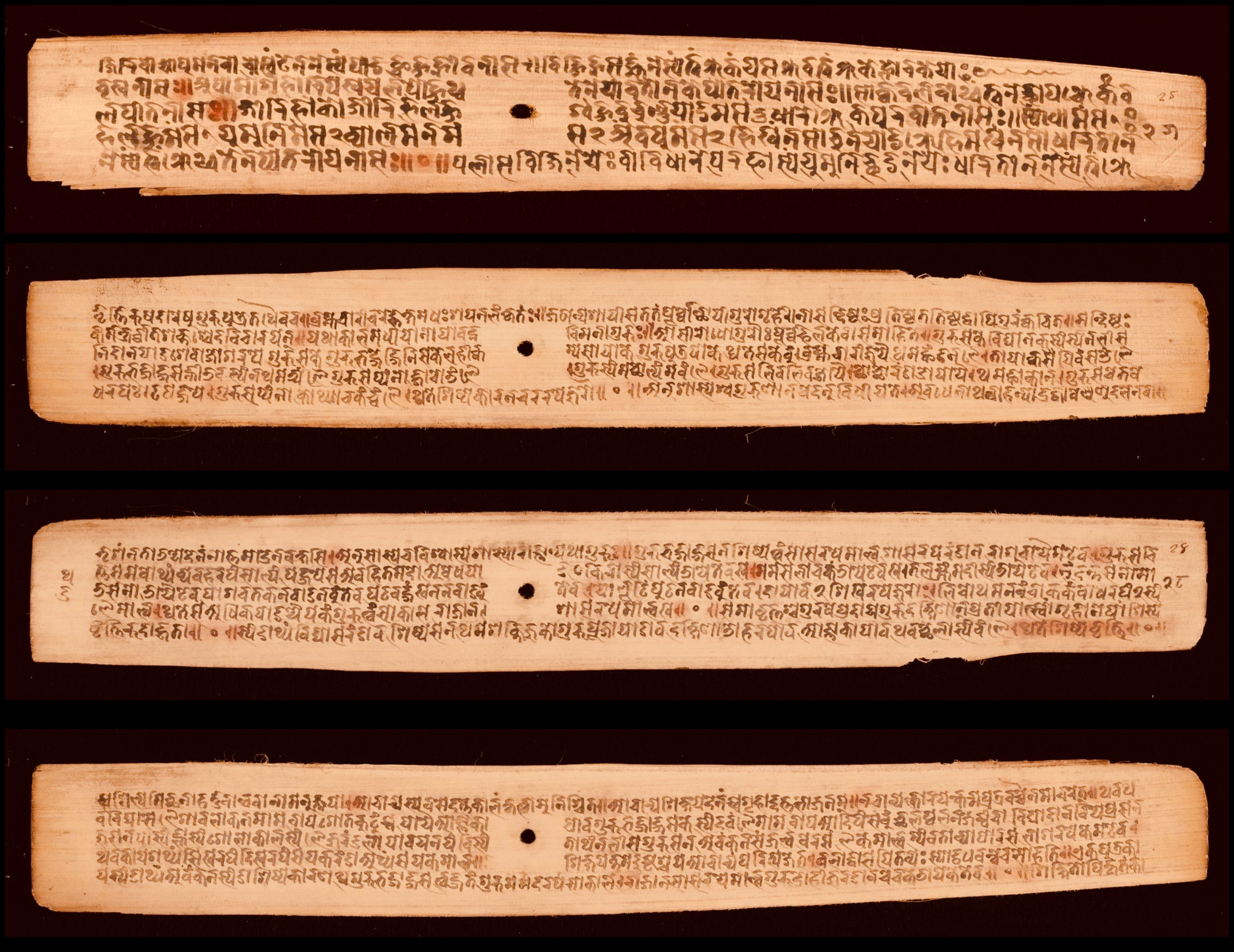
1407 CE manuscript of the Naradasmriti in Sanskrit, Bhujimol script from the Malla kingdom of Nepal. It was the dharmasastra used in this medieval era kingdom.

Nāradasmṛti is a part of the Dharmaśāstras, an Indian literary tradition that serves as a collection of legal maxims relating to the topic of dharma. This text is purely juridical in character in that it focuses solely on procedural and substantive law. Known as the "juridical text par excellence," the Nāradasmṛti is the only Dharmaśāstra text to not cover areas such as righteous conduct and penance. Its focused nature has made the text highly valued by rulers and their governments, in Indian subcontinent and southeast Asia, likely as an aid of carrying out their dharma of justly ruling the country.

== Recensions ==
Today there exist three recognized versions of Naradasmriti, also called Naradiya Dharmasastra. First, there is the “minor” recension, consisting of 879 verses and referred to by the siglum D. Next comes the recension known by the siglum P and consisting originally of 550 verses. Jolly later edited the text to contain verses from the “minor” recension as well, bringing the total to 1028 verses. The third version comes from the Newārī manuscripts and the Nāradīyamanusaṃhitā and goes by the siglum NMS, containing 870 verses. Each recension is unique not only in length, but content as well. For example, in P, an entire chapter is found of which no other manuscript makes mention. One of the most thoroughly studied differences is that of the variation in naming of Ordeals. The NMS, seen as the oldest of the three texts, lists only two ordeals in the standard chapter on “Nonpayment of Debt” but contains an addendum which lists five more ordeals. The Vulgate also lists five ordeals but manuscript P adds two more, bringing the total to seven.

== Source and Authority ==
One recension claims that “Manu Prajāpati originally composed a text in 100,000 verses and 1080 chapters, which was successively abridged by the sages Nārada, Mārkandeya, and Sumati Bhārgava, down to a text of 4,000 verses.” Nāradasmṛti, according to this recension's claim, represent the ninth chapter, regarding legal procedure, of Manu’s original text. This connection may enhance the prestige of Nāradasmṛti because some traditional texts state Manu pronouncements on dharma is above challenge. However, Lariviere notes that it is clear from the critical edition and examination of other ancient documents that this explanation of Nāradasmṛti's origin is a myth, and was added later.

Naradasmriti was an authoritative document not only in Indian subcontinent, as well as when Hinduism flourished in southeast Asia. A 12th-century inscription in Champa empire of Jaya Harivarman, in what is now modern Vietnam, declares that its court officials were "expert in all dharmasastras, especially Naradiya and Bhargaviya".

The divine sage Nārada is known as the messenger of the gods, transmitting divine will to the people of the earth. Although not known for being an expert in dharma, he has been portrayed as an instructor of law and politics.

== Author ==
Lariviere argues that there was “no single ‘author’ of this text" but rather, either an individual or a group who compiled all of the verses attributed by a particular community to the sage Nārada. Examination of the scripts of the original manuscript determines that the Nāradīyamanusaṃhitā manuscripts were written in the South of India while the Newārī manuscript came from Nepal. The recensions D and P appear to have been found throughout the subcontinent but rarely in Nepal or Kerala.

== Date ==
Similar to all ancient Indian texts, specific dates for the authoring of the Nāradasmṛti continue to elude scholars. Varying arguments have been made and evidences cited but no decisive conclusions have been made. The best timeframe which can be provided is somewhere between 100BCE and 400CE.

In 1876 manuscript D of the Nāradasmṛti was translated by the German scholar, Julius Jolly, making it available to legal scholars in Europe for the first time. The work was readily accepted in Europe due to its style, content, and structure which was similar enough to Roman legal texts of the time that the scholars felt comfortable dealing with it. Karl Marx even used this translation as a reference for his Asiatic Modes of Production.

In 1879, Jolly translated manuscript P.

In 1989, Lariviere revisited the text and produced a critical translation which includes evidence from the NWS manuscripts, as well as D and P, which Jolly used.

== Structure ==
The structure of the Nāradasmṛti is based on the eighteen titles of law, which are also mentioned in the Manusmṛti but with some variation in names. The text begins with a brief introduction into law and the courts before delving into these 18 titles, devoting a chapter to each. The way in which this text is written makes it clear that the author(s) was appealing to a community of practitioners, interested in directly applying the law to every day cases.

=== Matrka (Prolegomena) ===
1. Vyavaharah
2. Bhasa
3. Sabha

=== Vyavahārapada (18 Titles of Law) ===
1. Ŗṇādāna
2. Nikşepa
3. Sambhūyasamutthāna
4. Dattāpradānika
5. Abhyupetyāśuśrūṣā
6. Vetanasyānapākarma
7. Asvāmivikraya
8. Vikrīyāsaṃpradāna
9. Krītānuśaya
10. Samayasyānapākarma
11. Kṣetrajavivāda
12. Strīpuṃsayoga
13. Dāyabhāga
14. Sāhasa
15. Vākpāruṣya
16. Daṇḍapāruṣya
17. Dyūtasamāhvaya
18. Prakīrṇaka
