= Gopal Raj Vamshavali =

14th century chronicle of Nepal

Gopala Raj Vamshavali
- Bendall Vamshavali
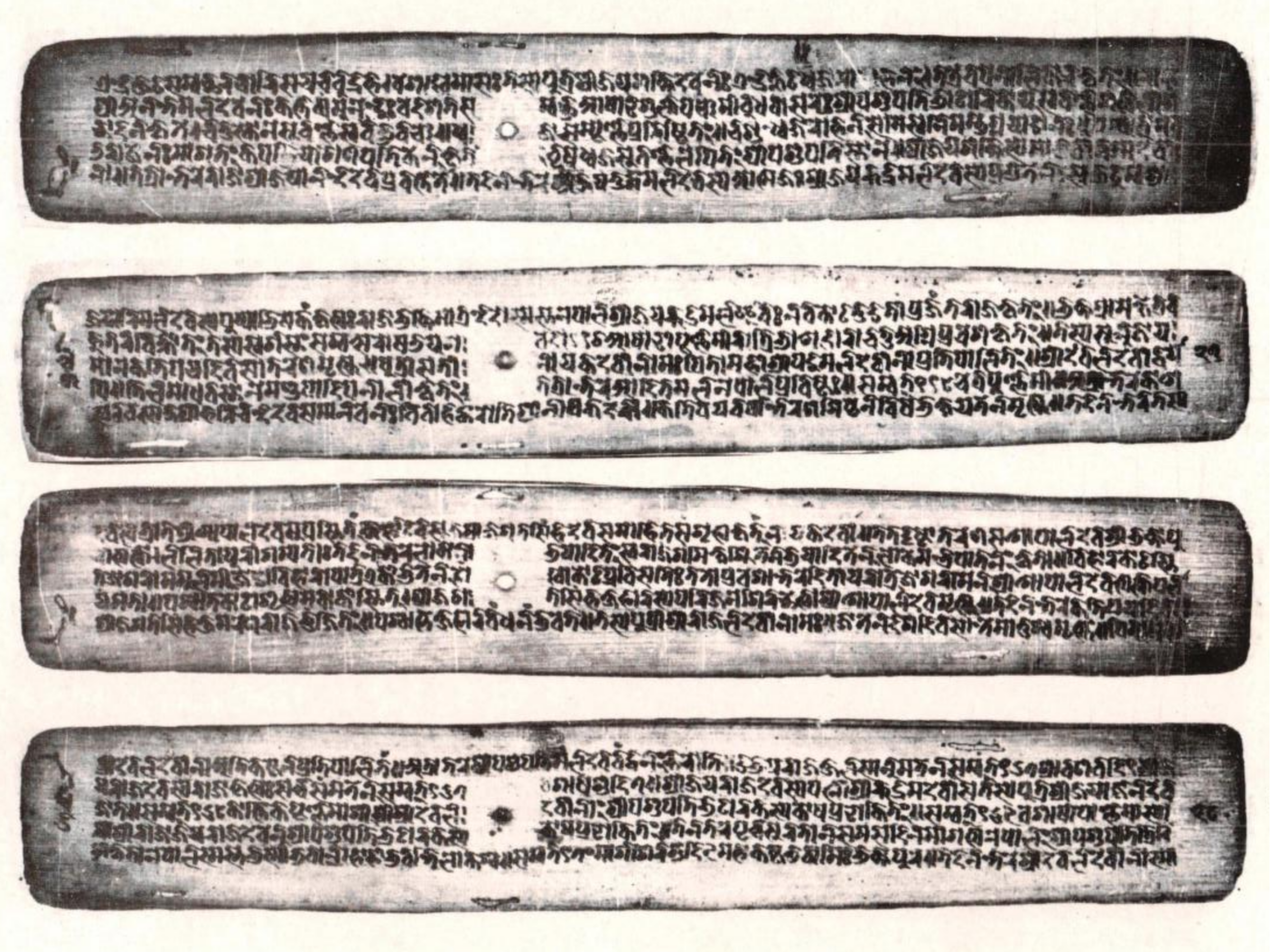
- Folio from the palm leaf manuscript at the National Archives of Nepal
- Patron: Jayasthiti Malla
- Language: Classical Newar and Sanskrit
- Date: 1389 CE
- Genre: History
- Period covered: 5th to 14th century
- Personages: Amshuverma, Arimalla, Jayarjunadeva, others

The Gopal Raj Vamshavali (IAST: Gopālarājavaṃśāvalī, Devanagari: गोपालराजवंशावली) is a 14th-century Nepalese chronicle and genealogical record of monarchs, written in Classical Newar and Sanskrit language in the Bhujimol script. The Gopal Raj Vamshavali is considered one of the most important works in the Newar language and the most popular and widely cited chronicle in Nepalese history.

== Etymology ==
This vamshavali was previously called Bendall Vaṃśāvalī, as Cecil Bendall found the manuscript in 1898–99 CE at Kathmandu's Durbar Library or the Bir Library. This was later, and popularly, called the Gopālarājavaṃśāvalī by scholars as Baburam Acharya and Yogi Naraharinath to name a few, as a hand-written catalog list of the library termed the manuscript Gopālavaṃśādi prācīna rājavaṃśāvalī(गोपालवंशादि प्राचीन राजवंशावली), meaning ancient royal vamshavali starting with the Gopala dynasty.

Pant, however, questions if this could be called a vamshavali proper, as the chronicler never mentions it thus.

== History ==
The Gopal Raj Vamshavali was commissioned by King Jayasthiti Malla in the 14th century. The sources for the entry of King Jayasthiti Malla's reign was what the chronicler himself saw; while entries for earlier events were sourced from other historical writings, as most are provided with full pañcaṅga details with fumbled chronology. Penned during the reign of King Jayasthiti Malla, details of his reign are abundantly found in the Gopal Raj Vamshavali.

The first 16 folios of the Gopal Raj Vamshavali are missing. The accuracy of this chronicle begins from Licchavi period. The original copy of Gopal Raj Vamshavali is now stored at National Archives, Kathmandu in an unsatisfactory state, in contrast to an excellent condition, when Cecil Bendall found it at the turn of the 19th century.

== Structure ==
Considering the language of this Gopal Raj Vamshavali, it can be divided broadly into two sections, viz. the Sanskrit and the Newari sections. The majority of the Gopal Raj Vamshavali is written in the Newar language, comprising 33 folios, while the Sanskrit portion consists of only 14 folios. The original manusscript was written in the Bhujimol script. Kamal P. Malla, classifies it as Vaṃśāvalī_{1} and Vaṃśāvalī_{2} particularly based on the use of two different languages and styles.

1. V_{1} (Folio 17–30a): This section is in the form of annals or king-lists. It is in Sanskrit language, but has abundant grammatical errors.
2. V_{2} (Folio 30b–63b): This section is mainly about the births of royal and distinguished personages, political conflicts, religious contributions, construction works and natural disasters. It begins with NS 177 (1057 AD) and is composed in Newari language.

== Summary ==
With the advent of Kali Yuga in the primordial kingdom of Yudhisthira, Śrī Bhṛṅgāreśvara Bhaṭṭāraka emerged. There, ṛṣi (saint) Gautama came and established Gautameśvara and other deities.

Gopālas (cow-herds) came to the valley and in the Gopāla-vaṃśa, eight kings ruled for 505 years 3 months. Thereafter, Mahiṣapāla (buffalo-herd) kings ruled up to 3 generations for 161 years 2 months. The Kiratas conquered the valley and ruled up to 32 generations for 1958 years 2 months.

Thereafter the Solar Line ruled Vimalanagarī and Nepal by defeating the Kirata kings. To name some important contributions, Śrī Supuṣpadeva enforced the varṇa system and constructed temple of Śrī Paśupati Bhaṭṭāraka. He built a town dedicated to the Lord, enforced all laws and ruled with justice. Similarly, Śrī Bhāskaradeva observed penance at Paśupati, by merit of which he conquered Kāñcinagara Maṇḍala up to southern sea. Likewise, King Śrī Haridattavarmā constructed Lord Viṣṇu Bhaṭṭāraka temple in all four śikhara-pradeśa (hillocks). Śrī Viśvadeva consecrated a Caitya Bhaṭṭāraka in Sinaguṃ vihāra (Svayambhū) and set up stone water-conduit. He also installed a big trident at northern side of Śrī Paśupati. Śrī Mānadeva unknowingly killed his father and observed penance at Guṃ vihāra and consecrated a caitya and Śrī Māneśvarīdevī temple. He regulated land measurements and rent, and started the tradition of celebrating Holi. Śrī Gaṇadeva offered treasury to Śrī Paśupati Bhaṭṭāraka to cause rainfall and propitiated Mahānāga after three years of drought. Gopālas vanquished the Solar Line and ruled for three generations.

Again, the Licchavis ruled. Śrī Aṃśuvarmā founded Rājavihāra, and started system of grammar and other branches of learning. They were from a different scion. Thereafter, the Solar dynasty ruled over Nepal again. Śrī Narendradeva initiated the festival of Śrī Lokeśvara of Bungamati and Śrī Bālārjunadeva offered his crown to Buṅga Lokeśvara Bhaṭṭāraka. Śrī Mānadeva constructed market-place; Śrī Guṇakāma deva constructed rest house and performed koti-homa (crore homas); Śrī Lakṣmīkāma deva sponsored ceremonies to bring peace in the nation (200 NS). In the same line, Śrī Bhāskaradeva sold paternal crown and destroyed the image of Śrī Māneśvarī Bhaṭṭāraka, for which he suffered a great deal. In the same line, Śrī Śivadeva completed the (re-)construction of temple of Śrī Paśupati Bhaṭṭāraka and temple of the Eastern mountain (Changu), four-storeyed royal palace with five courtyards, canals at Balkhu river, water-conduits, wells and tanks. He brought silver and gold coins in use.

With Śrī Arimalladeva's reign, a great famine and epidemic spread. A great earthquake in NS 375 (1255 AD) brought a "lot of suffering" to propitiate which annual lakṣahoma and fortnightly pakṣaśrāddha were performed. The Khaśas under Jayatāri (Jitārimalla) entered the valley for the first time from west in NS 408 (1288 AD) and were massacred in large number; next they set the villages on fire. The Tirhutiyās entered the valley in NS 411 (1291 AD). Sultan Shamsuddīn raided the kingdom and reduced the whole Nepal valley in ashes, including breaking of the Śrī Paśupatināṭh icon to three pieces.

Śrī Jayasthitirājamalla, brought by Śrī Devaladevī, became King upon marriage with Rājalladevī. By the grace of Svayambhū, he made several reforms. Next is described the installment of four Nārāyaṇas in all four directions.

Following this, there is a detailed description of the events from 177 NS (1057 AD), which Malla (1985) categorizes as Vaṃśāvalī_{2} from folio 31. With full details of astrological dates (pañcāṅgas), this part describes the stories of birth, deaths, marriages of different kings and as well as political to religious and social works. A few of such themes listed here under:

1. Power struggles among different rulers and elites, including wars, raids, violence etc.
2. Governance and reforms mostly based on Hindu religious doctrines.
3. Maintenance of peace, social harmony and security.
4. Development works and consecration, reconstruction of temples, rest houses, canals, etc.
5. Cultural performances including dances, theatres, festivals, feast etc.
6. Environmental concerns, especially towards coping with disasters, drought and famine etc.

In addition, it also covers events of political conflicts, religious contributions, construction works and disaster relief.

== See also ==
- Chronicles of Nepal
- Medieval history of Nepal
- Jayasthiti Malla
- Newar language
- Malla dynasty (Nepal)
