= Kutila inscription of Bareilly =

The Kutila inscription of Bareilly is an inscription in the Kutila script (कुटिल लिपि) dating to 992 CE that provides crucial evidence in tracing the shared descent of the Devanagari and Bengali-Assamese scripts of Northern and Eastern India from the predecessor Gupta script. The writing was found on a stone unearthed in Bareilly district in the United Provinces of Agra and Oudh (modern-day Uttar Pradesh). The inscription proclaims that it was created by an engraver from Kannauj who was "proficient in the Kutila character". It also includes the date of the inscription, Vikram Samvat 1049, which corresponds to 992 CE.

The word Kutila (कुटिल) means crooked in the Sanskrit language, and it is assumed that the name came from the curving shapes of Kutila letters, distinct from the straighter lines of the Brahmi and Gupta scripts.

The Unicode encoding for Siddham is to serve as a unifying block for all regional variants of the script, such as Siddhamātṛkā and Kuṭila. The Siddham glyphs are based upon Japanese forms of Siddham characters on account of active usage of the script by Japanese Buddhist communities.

== See also ==
- Gupta script
- Brahmi script
- Devanagari
- Ranjana script
- Lanydza script
