= Siddhaṃ script =

Script of the Brahmic family

Siddham script Siddhaṃ 𑖭𑖰𑖟𑖿𑖠𑖽
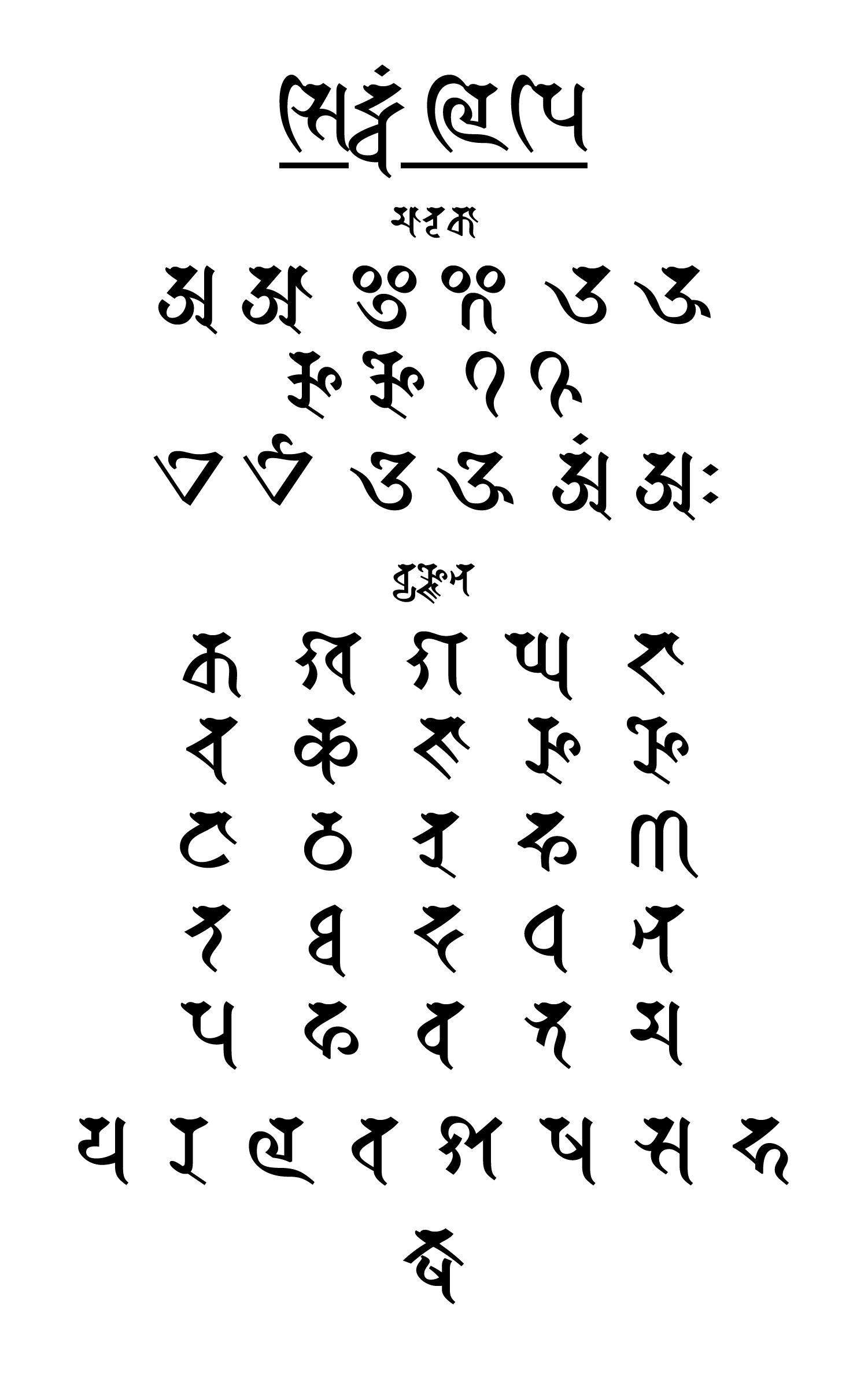
- The Siddhaṃ Alphabet Chart
- Script type: Abugida
- Period: c. late 6th century – c. 1200 CE (Note: Its usage survives into the modern period for liturgical purposes in Japan, particularly in Shingon and Tendai Buddhism.)
- Direction: Left-to-right
- Languages: Sanskrit

Related scripts
- Parent systems: Egyptian hieroglyphs: Proto-Sinaitic; Phoenician; Aramaic (debated); Brahmi; Gupta; Siddham script
- Child systems: Nagari; Gaudi script; Assamese; Bengali; Odia; Tirhuta; Nepalese
- Sister systems: Sharada Tibetan, Kalinga, Bhaiksuki

ISO 15924
- ISO 15924: Sidd (302), Siddham, Siddhaṃ, Siddhamātṛkā

Unicode
- Unicode alias: Siddham
- Unicode range: U+11580–U+115FF Final Accepted Script Proposal Variant Forms

Siddhaṃ (Sanskrit pronunciation: [sidːʱɐ̃]) (also known as Kutila) is an Indic script used in India from the 6th century to the 13th century. Also known in its later evolved form as Siddhamātṛkā, Siddham is a medieval Brahmic abugida, derived from the Gupta script and ancestral to the Nāgarī, Eastern Nagari, Tirhuta, Odia and Nepalese scripts. The Siddham script was widely used by Indian Buddhists and still remains in use by East Asian Buddhists, especially for writing mantras, seed syllables, and dharanis.

== Name ==
The word Siddhaṃ means "accomplished", "completed" or "perfected" in Sanskrit. The script received its name from the practice of writing Siddhaṃ, or Siddhaṃ astu ('may there be perfection'), at the head of documents. The name Siddhamātṛkā is reported by the 11th-century scholar Al-Biruni, which seems to be corroborated by the term "Siddhaṃ," which is the term used for the script by Buddhist tradition in East Asia. This makes the Siddhaṃ script one of the few Indian scripts whose traditional name is known from historical sources. In Chinese, the name is rendered as xitan wenzi (simplified Chinese: 悉昙文字; traditional Chinese: 悉曇文字; pinyin: Xītán wénzi; lit. 'Siddham script'), and in Japanese as shittan (悉曇).

Because of the prominent bends and loops of the letterforms, some epigraphists and historians referred to the script as Kuṭila (Sanskrit for "crooked" or "bent"). Other names for the script include bonji (Japanese: 梵字; Chinese: fànzì).

== History ==
The Siddham script traces directly back to Early Brāhmī, the foundational script of South Asia, which was used during the Mauryan period (c. 3rd century BCE). Between the 4th and 6th centuries CE, Ashokan Brāhmī diversified into distinct regional styles. In Northern India, it developed into the Gupta script (sometimes termed Late Brahmi or Early Nagari), which served as the official administrative and literary hand of the Gupta Empire. During the late 6th century CE, the Gupta script underwent structural and calligraphic refinements, giving rise to Siddhamātṛkā. This transitional period is defined by the introduction of sharply angled stroke terminations and solid triangular or wedge-shaped head-marks (śirorekhā). Among the earliest specimens of the Siddhaṃ script are the Bodhgaya inscription of Mahanaman, dated 588/89 CE, and the Lakhamandal inscription.

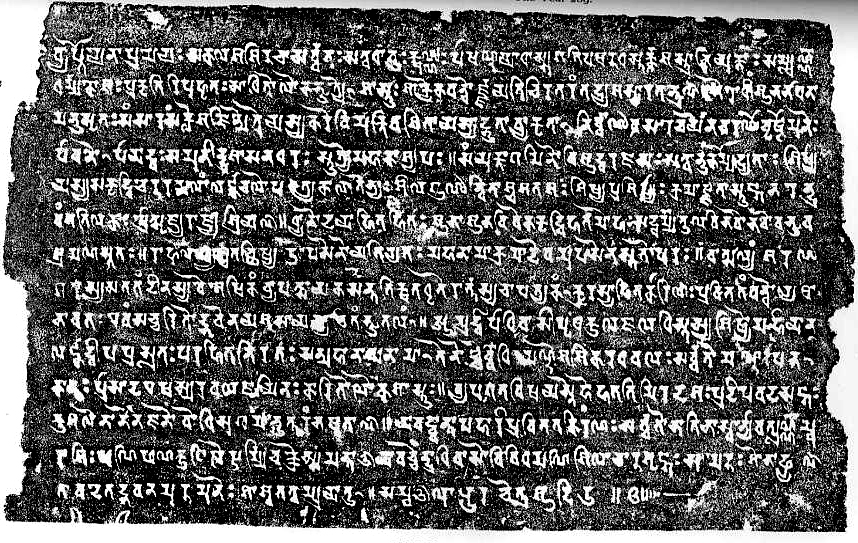
Rubbing of the Bodh Gayā inscription of Mahānāman

By the 7th century CE, Siddhaṃ had become the primary script used across Northern India for transcribing classical Sanskrit literature, royal land-grant charters (tāmra-paṭṭa), and religious texts, particularly within Mahāyāna and Vajrayāna Buddhist monastic universities, such as Nālandā and Vikramaśīla. Siddhaṃ was used not only in northern and eastern India but also in the west, where it displaced the southern-style scripts that had previously predominated there. Siddhaṃ occasionally appeared in the Deccan and even the far south, as in the Pattadakal bilingual inscription. In this respect Siddhamātṛkā precursed the later role of its daughter script Devanāgarī, as a quasi-national script that was often preferred for writing Sanskrit, even outside the regions where it originated.

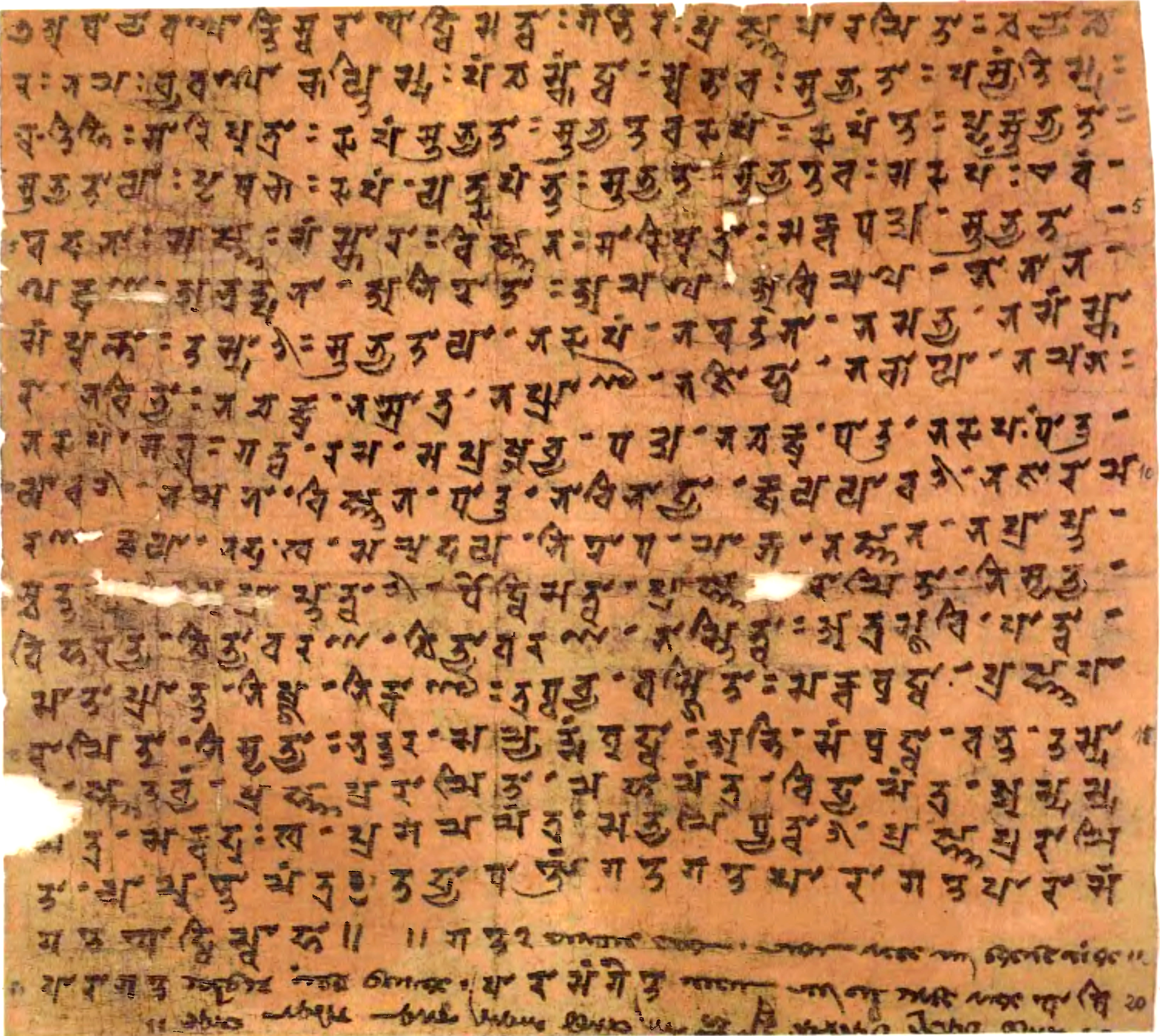
A Siddhaṃ manuscript of the Heart Sutra. Bibliothèque nationale de France

=== Spread to East Asia ===
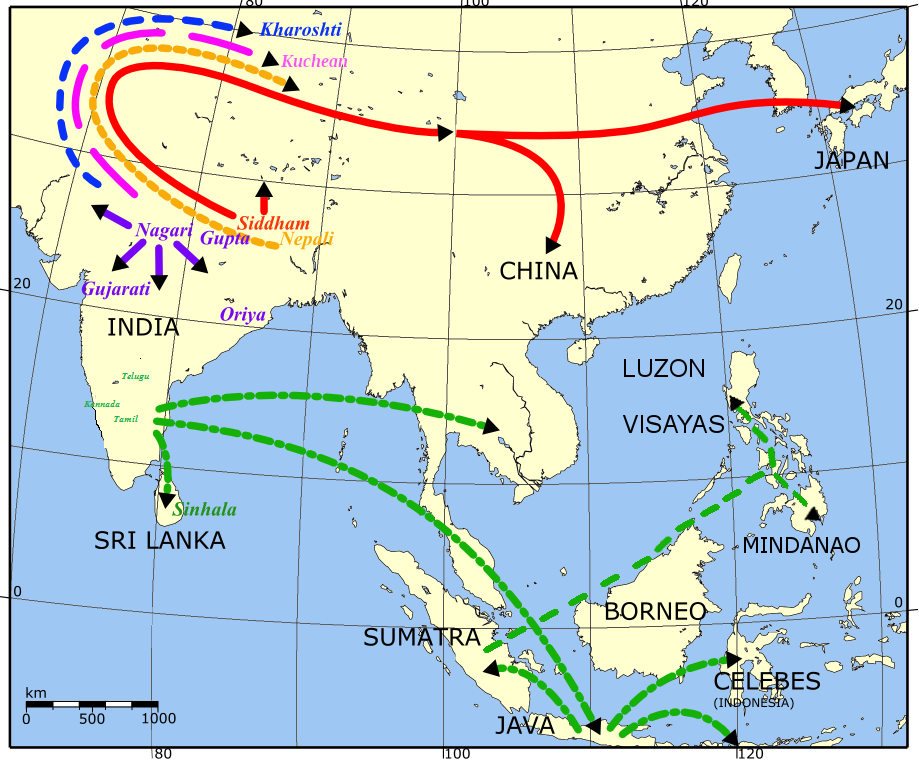
The spread of Siddham, in red, from India to East Asia.

Most Buddhist texts and Sanskrit materials that were transmitted to China from India and Central Asia during the Tang dynasty, were written in Siddhaṃ. The script was especially associated with Tantric Buddhism, and was used for writing mantras, dhāraṇīs, and bijakṣaras (seed syllables). Around the year 800, the Hsi-t'an-tzu-chi (Chinese: 悉曇字記; pinyin: Xītán Zìjì), a primer on Siddhaṃ, was prepared by a Chinese monk, specifically to train Tantric monks to pronounce mantras correctly. This book became the standard textbook for Sanskrit in China and the Far East, but dealt only with the Siddham letters, not with Sanskrit grammar. In China, less attention was given to the correct pronunciation of Sanskrit, and more to the written word. The Chinese paid special attention to the form of the Siddham letters, which grew into a special calligraphic tradition.

From China, the Siddham script was carried to Korea, presumably in the 7th century. The Siddham script perhaps influenced the creation of Hangul.

Kūkai introduced the Siddhaṃ script to Japan when he returned from China in 806, where he studied Sanskrit with Nalanda-trained monks including one known as Prajñā (734–c. 810). The Buddhist monk Saichō (767–822) was another important propagator of Siddham in Japan, and founded the Tendai school of Buddhism.

During the Northern Song dynasty (960 - 1127 A.D.), the study of the Siddham script continued to prosper.

The East Asian tradition further developed Siddham calligraphic forms, split between Chinese, Japanese and Korean styles. As was done with Chinese characters, Japanese Buddhist scholars sometimes created multiple characters with the same phonological value to add meaning to Siddhaṃ characters. This practice, in effect, represents a 'blend' of the Chinese style of writing and the Indian style of writing and allows Sanskrit texts in Siddhaṃ to be differentially interpreted as they are read, as was done with Chinese characters that the Japanese had adopted. This led to multiple variants of the same characters.

=== Disappearance in India and China ===
In India, beginning around the 9th and 10th centuries CE, the Siddhaṃ script began to transition into regional variants, represented by Nāgarī in the north and west, and Gauḍī in the east. The Kutila inscription of Bareilly dated to VS 1049 (992 CE), demonstrates the emergence of the horizontal bar to group letters belonging to a word, which would become the horizontal line in the Devanagari script. By the 11th century, Siddham had been replaced for epigraphic and literary purposes by (Deva-)nagari, which had reached its now standard form.

Meanwhile, China had been taken over by the Mongol Yuan dynasty in 1271. Kublai Khan attempted a failed invasion of Japan in 1274, after which no contact was re-established between China and Japan. This meant that no new Buddhist material reached Japan from China. Nevertheless, the Tendai and Shingon schools continued the study of Siddham in Japan.

By 1280, the Mongols had occupied the entirety of China, and introduced Lamaism as the state-religion. The popularity of Tantrism and Siddham studies decreased greatly, while the study of the Lantsa script and other Indian scripts prospered. After the fall of the Yuan dynasty in 1368, the use of Siddham declined, together with Chinese Buddhism. When the Ming dynasty was established, direct contact between China and India had already been interrupted for centuries. Although the newly independent Ming initially sought to shed foreign cultural influences, Buddhism itself was by this point too thoroughly "sinified" to be regarded as alien, and thus was spared. However, because Chinese Buddhism had lost much of its earlier vigour, for political reasons the Ming emperors preferred the Tibetan Lamaism, introduced by the Mongols, over Chinese Buddhist sects. By this time, organized Tantrism appears to have disappeared as a distinct school in China, and Siddham was completely superseded for the writing of Sanskrit by the Lantsa script used with Tibetan Lamaism. During the following Qing dynasty (1644–1911), Siddham fell completely into oblivion in China. Evidence suggests that both the study of the Sanskrit language and of the Siddham script were practically nonexistent in China between the 15th and the 20th centuries.

=== Survival in Japan ===
During the rule of the Tokugawa shogunate, from 1603 to 1868, Buddhism was heavily promoted. Siddham flourished in ritual use and calligraphy. Japan remains the only region where Siddham persisted in active use until today, above all within the Shingon and Tendai schools founded in the traditions of Kūkai and Saichō. The schools continue to use Siddham in the calligraphic writing of Sanskrit bīja syllables and mantras.

== Characteristics ==
Siddhaṃ is an abugida rather than an alphabet, as each character indicates a syllable, including a consonant and (possibly) a vowel. If the vowel sound is not explicitly indicated, the short 'a' is assumed. Diacritic marks are used to indicate other vowels, as well as the anusvara and visarga. A virama can be used to indicate that the consonant letter stands alone with no vowel, which sometimes happens at the end of Sanskrit words.

Siddhaṃ texts were usually written from left to right then top to bottom, as with other Brahmic scripts, but occasionally they were written in the traditional Chinese style, from top to bottom then right to left. Bilingual Siddhaṃ-Japanese texts show the manuscript turned 90 degrees clockwise and the Japanese is written from top to bottom, as is typical of Japanese, and then the manuscript is turned back again, and the Siddhaṃ writing is continued from left to right (the resulting Japanese characters appear sideways).

Over time, additional markings were developed, including punctuation marks, head marks, repetition marks, end marks, special ligatures to combine conjuncts and rarely to combine syllables, and several ornaments of the scribe's choice, which are not currently encoded. The nuqta is also used in some modern Siddhaṃ texts.

=== Vowels and syllables ===
Siddhaṃ includes five long vowels, five short vowels, two vocalic consonants, ṛ and ḷ which are treated as vowels and may be short or long, and two part-vowels, anusvara ⟨𑖽⟩ ṁ and visarga, ⟨𑖾⟩ ḥ. Independent vowel letters are used for word-initial vowels. Otherwise, vowels, vocalics, and part-vowels are written as diacritics attached to consonants. Each consonant in Siddham includes an inherent vowel a, so the letter ⟨𑖎⟩, for example, is pronounced ka. Adding a vowel diacritic modifies the vowel sound, so ⟨𑖎𑖿𑖧⟩ plus the diacritic ⟨𑖺⟩, gives the syllable ⟨𑖎𑖿𑖧𑖺⟩, ko. The absence of a vowel is marked with a virāma ⟨𑖿⟩, for example, ⟨𑖎⟩ ka plus ⟨𑖿⟩ creates an isolated consonant ⟨𑖎𑖿⟩ k.

Vowels
| | short | | | | | long | | | | |
| independent | 𑖀 a | 𑖂 i | 𑖄 u | 𑖊 e | 𑖌 o | 𑖁 ā | 𑖃 ī | 𑖅 ū | 𑖋 ai | 𑖍 au |
| diacritic | ◌ | 𑖰 i | 𑖲 u | 𑖸 e | 𑖺 o | 𑖯 ā | 𑖱 ī | 𑖳 ū | 𑖹 ai | 𑖻 au |
| syllable with 𑖎 | ◌ | 𑖎𑖰 ki | 𑖎𑖲 ku | 𑖎𑖸 ke | 𑖎𑖺 ko | 𑖎𑖯 kā | 𑖎𑖱 kī | 𑖎𑖳 kū | 𑖎𑖹 kai | 𑖎𑖻 kau |

Other syllables
| | syllabic consonants | | | | other modifiers | | | |
| | short | | long | | nasal | | aspiration | vowel killer |
| independent | 𑖎𑖴 ṛ | 𑖈 ḷ | 𑖇 ṝ | 𑖉 ḹ | ◌ | ◌ | ◌ | ◌ |
| diacritic | 𑖴 kṛ | ◌ | 𑖵 kṝ | ◌ | 𑖽 ṃ | 𑖼 ṃ | 𑖾 ḥ | 𑖿 |
| syllable with 𑖎 | 𑖎𑖴 kṛ | 𑖎𑖈 kḷ | 𑖎𑖵 kṝ | 𑖎𑖉 kḹ | 𑖎𑖽 kaṃ | 𑖎𑖼 kaṃ | 𑖎𑖾 kaḥ | 𑖎𑖿 k |

=== Consonants ===
| | Stop | | | | | Approximant | Fricative |
| | Tenuis | Aspirated | Voiced | Breathy | Nasal | Approximant | Fricative |
|---|---|---|---|---|---|---|---|
| Glottal | | | | | | | 𑖮 h |
| Velar | 𑖎 k | 𑖏 kh | 𑖐 g | 𑖑 gh | 𑖒 ṅ | | |
| Palatal | 𑖓 c | 𑖔 ch | 𑖕 j | 𑖖 jh | 𑖗 ñ | 𑖧 y | 𑖫 ś |
| Retroflex | 𑖘 ṭ | 𑖙 ṭh | 𑖚 ḍ | 𑖛 ḍh | 𑖜 ṇ | 𑖨 r | 𑖬 ṣ |
| Dental | 𑖝 t | 𑖞 th | 𑖟 d | 𑖠 dh | 𑖡 n | 𑖩 l | 𑖭 s |
| Bilabial | 𑖢 p | 𑖣 ph | 𑖤 b | 𑖥 bh | 𑖦 m | | |
| Labiodental | | | | | | 𑖪 v | |

Two conjuncts are also treated as part of the alphabet.

| 𑖎𑖿𑖬 kṣ | 𑖩𑖿𑖩𑖽 llaṃ |

=== Conjuncts ===
| k$\cdots$kṣ | -ya | -ra | -la | -va | -ma | -na |
|---|---|---|---|---|---|---|
| 𑖎 k | 𑖎𑖿𑖧 kya | 𑖎𑖿𑖨 kra | 𑖎𑖿𑖩 kla | 𑖎𑖿𑖪 kva | 𑖎𑖿𑖦 kma | 𑖎𑖿𑖡 kna |
| 𑖨𑖿𑖎 rk | 𑖨𑖿𑖎𑖿𑖧 rkya | 𑖨𑖿𑖎𑖿𑖨 rkra | 𑖨𑖿𑖎𑖿𑖩 rkla | 𑖨𑖿𑖎𑖿𑖪 rkva | 𑖨𑖿𑖎𑖿𑖦 rkma | 𑖨𑖿𑖎𑖿𑖡 rkna |
| 𑖏 kh | $\cdots$ | | | | | |
$\vdots$ total 68 rows.

| 𑖒𑖿𑖎 ṅka | 𑖒𑖿𑖏 ṅkha | 𑖒𑖿𑖐 ṅga | 𑖒𑖿𑖑 ṅgha |
| 𑖗𑖿𑖓 ñca | 𑖗𑖿𑖔 ñcha | 𑖗𑖿𑖕 ñja | 𑖗𑖿𑖖 ñjha |
| 𑖜𑖿𑖘 ṇṭa | 𑖜𑖿𑖙 ṇṭha | 𑖜𑖿𑖚 ṇḍa | 𑖜𑖿𑖛 ṇḍha |
| 𑖡𑖿𑖝 nta | 𑖡𑖿𑖞 ntha | 𑖡𑖿𑖟 nda | 𑖡𑖿𑖠 ndha |
| 𑖦𑖿𑖢 mpa | 𑖦𑖿𑖣 mpha | 𑖦𑖿𑖤 mba | 𑖦𑖿𑖥 mbha |

| 𑖒𑖿𑖧 ṅya | 𑖒𑖿𑖨 ṅra | 𑖒𑖿𑖩 ṅla | 𑖒𑖿𑖪 ṅva | |
| 𑖒𑖿𑖫 ṅśa | 𑖒𑖿𑖬 ṅṣa | 𑖒𑖿𑖭 ṅsa | 𑖒𑖿𑖮 ṅha | 𑖒𑖿𑖎𑖿𑖬 ṅkṣa |

| 𑖭𑖿𑖎 ska | 𑖭𑖿𑖏 skha | 𑖟𑖿𑖐 dga | 𑖟𑖿𑖑 dgha | 𑖒𑖿𑖎𑖿𑖝𑖿𑖨 ṅktra |
| 𑖪𑖿𑖓 vca/bca | 𑖪𑖿𑖔 vcha/bcha | 𑖪𑖿𑖕 vja/bja | 𑖪𑖿𑖖 vjha/bjha | 𑖕𑖿𑖗 jña |
| 𑖬𑖿𑖘 ṣṭa | 𑖬𑖿𑖙 ṣṭha | 𑖟𑖿𑖚 dḍa | 𑖟𑖿𑖛 dḍha | 𑖬𑖿𑖜 ṣṇa |
| 𑖭𑖿𑖝 sta | 𑖭𑖿𑖞 stha | 𑖪𑖿𑖟 vda/bda | 𑖪𑖿𑖠 vdha/bdha | 𑖨𑖿𑖝𑖿𑖭𑖿𑖡 rtsna |
| 𑖭𑖿𑖢 spa | 𑖭𑖿𑖣 spha | 𑖟𑖿𑖤 dba | 𑖟𑖿𑖥 dbha | 𑖨𑖿𑖎𑖿𑖬𑖿𑖦 rkṣma |

| 𑖨𑖿𑖎𑖿𑖬𑖿𑖪𑖿𑖧 rkṣvya | 𑖨𑖿𑖎𑖿𑖬𑖿𑖪𑖿𑖨𑖿𑖧 rkṣvrya | 𑖩𑖿𑖝 lta | 𑖝𑖿𑖎𑖿𑖪 tkva |
| 𑖘𑖿𑖫 ṭśa | 𑖘𑖿𑖬 ṭṣa | 𑖭𑖿𑖮 sha | 𑖤𑖿𑖎𑖿𑖬 bkṣa |

| 𑖢𑖿𑖝 pta | 𑖘𑖿𑖎 ṭka | 𑖟𑖿𑖭𑖿𑖪 dsva | 𑖘𑖿𑖬𑖿𑖔𑖿𑖨 ṭṣchra |

| 𑖕𑖿𑖕 jja | 𑖘𑖿𑖘 ṭṭa | 𑖜𑖿𑖜 ṇṇa | 𑖝𑖿𑖝 tta | 𑖡𑖿𑖡 nna | 𑖦𑖿𑖦 mma | 𑖩𑖿𑖩 lla | 𑖪𑖿𑖪 vva | $\cdots$ |

Alternative forms of conjuncts that contain ṇ.

| 𑖜𑖿𑖘 ṇṭa | 𑖜𑖿𑖙 ṇṭha | 𑖜𑖿𑖚 ṇḍa | 𑖜𑖿𑖛 ṇḍha |

==== ṛ syllables ====
| 𑖎𑖴 kṛ | 𑖏𑖴 khṛ | 𑖐𑖴 gṛ | 𑖑𑖴 ghṛ | 𑖒𑖴 ṅṛ | 𑖓𑖴 cṛ | 𑖔𑖴 chṛ | 𑖕𑖴 jṛ | 𑖖𑖴 jhṛ | 𑖗𑖴 ñṛ | $\cdots$ |

==== Some sample syllables ====
| 𑖨𑖿𑖎 rka | 𑖨𑖿𑖎𑖯 rkā | 𑖨𑖿𑖎𑖰 rki | 𑖨𑖿𑖎𑖱 rkī | 𑖨𑖿𑖎𑖲 rku | 𑖨𑖿𑖎𑖳 rkū | 𑖨𑖿𑖎𑖸 rke | 𑖨𑖿𑖎𑖹 rkai | 𑖨𑖿𑖎𑖺 rko | 𑖨𑖿𑖎𑖻 rkau | 𑖨𑖿𑖎𑖽 rkaṃ | 𑖨𑖿𑖎𑖾 rkaḥ |
| 𑖒𑖿𑖎 ṅka | 𑖒𑖿𑖎𑖯 ṅkā | 𑖒𑖿𑖎𑖰 ṅki | 𑖒𑖿𑖎𑖱 ṅkī | 𑖒𑖿𑖎𑖲 ṅku | 𑖒𑖿𑖎𑖳 ṅkū | 𑖒𑖿𑖎𑖸 ṅke | 𑖒𑖿𑖎𑖹 ṅkai | 𑖒𑖿𑖎𑖺 ṅko | 𑖒𑖿𑖎𑖻 ṅkau | 𑖒𑖿𑖎𑖽 ṅkaṃ | 𑖒𑖿𑖎𑖾 ṅkaḥ |

== Usage ==
As was done with Chinese characters, Japanese Buddhist scholars sometimes created multiple characters with the same phonological value to add meaning to Siddhaṃ characters. This practice, in effect, represents a 'blend' of the Chinese style of writing and the Indian style of writing and allows Sanskrit texts in Siddhaṃ to be differentially interpreted as they are read, as was done with Chinese characters that the Japanese had adopted. This led to multiple variants of the same characters.

In Japan, the writing of mantras and copying/reading of sutras using the Siddhaṃ script is still practiced in the esoteric schools of Shingon Buddhism and Tendai as well as in the syncretic sect of Shugendō. The Taishō Tripiṭaka version of the Chinese Buddhist canon preserves the Siddhaṃ characters for most mantras, and Korean Buddhists still write bījas in a modified form of Siddhaṃ. A recent innovation is the writing of Japanese language slogans on T-shirts using bonji. Japanese Siddhaṃ has evolved from the original script used to write sūtras and is now somewhat different from the ancient script.

It is typical to see Siddhaṃ written with a brush, as with Chinese writing; it is also written with a bamboo pen. In Japan, a special brush called a bokuhitsu (朴筆; Cantonese: pokbat) is used for formal Siddhaṃ calligraphy. The informal style is known as "fude" (筆; Cantonese: "moubat").

== Siddhaṃ fonts ==
Siddhaṃ is still largely a hand written script. Some efforts have been made to create computer fonts, though to date none of these are capable of reproducing all of the Siddhaṃ conjunct consonants. Notably, the Chinese Buddhist Electronic Texts Association has created a Siddhaṃ font for their electronic version of the Taisho Tripiṭaka, though this does not contain all possible conjuncts. The software Mojikyo also contains fonts for Siddhaṃ, but split Siddhaṃ in different blocks and requires multiple fonts to render a single document.

A Siddhaṃ input system which relies on the CBETA font Siddhamkey 3.0 has been produced.

== Unicode ==
Siddhaṃ script was added to the Unicode Standard in June 2014 with the release of version 7.0.

The Unicode block for Siddhaṃ is U+11580–U+115FF:

Siddham^{[1]}^{[2]} Official Unicode Consortium code chart (PDF)
| | 0 | 1 | 2 | 3 | 4 | 5 | 6 | 7 | 8 | 9 | A | B | C | D | E | F |
| U+1158x | 𑖀 | 𑖁 | 𑖂 | 𑖃 | 𑖄 | 𑖅 | 𑖆 | 𑖇 | 𑖈 | 𑖉 | 𑖊 | 𑖋 | 𑖌 | 𑖍 | 𑖎 | 𑖏 |
| U+1159x | 𑖐 | 𑖑 | 𑖒 | 𑖓 | 𑖔 | 𑖕 | 𑖖 | 𑖗 | 𑖘 | 𑖙 | 𑖚 | 𑖛 | 𑖜 | 𑖝 | 𑖞 | 𑖟 |
| U+115Ax | 𑖠 | 𑖡 | 𑖢 | 𑖣 | 𑖤 | 𑖥 | 𑖦 | 𑖧 | 𑖨 | 𑖩 | 𑖪 | 𑖫 | 𑖬 | 𑖭 | 𑖮 | 𑖯 |
| U+115Bx | 𑖰 | 𑖱 | 𑖲 | 𑖳 | 𑖴 | 𑖵 | | | 𑖸 | 𑖹 | 𑖺 | 𑖻 | 𑖼 | 𑖽 | 𑖾 | 𑖿 |
| U+115Cx | 𑗀 | 𑗁 | 𑗂 | 𑗃 | 𑗄 | 𑗅 | 𑗆 | 𑗇 | 𑗈 | 𑗉 | 𑗊 | 𑗋 | 𑗌 | 𑗍 | 𑗎 | 𑗏 |
| U+115Dx | 𑗐 | 𑗑 | 𑗒 | 𑗓 | 𑗔 | 𑗕 | 𑗖 | 𑗗 | 𑗘 | 𑗙 | 𑗚 | 𑗛 | 𑗜 | 𑗝 | | |
| U+115Ex | | | | | | | | | | | | | | | | |
| U+115Fx | | | | | | | | | | | | | | | | |
Notes 1.As of Unicode version 18.0 2.Grey areas indicate non-assigned code points

== Gallery ==
Example Siddham script usage
A reproduction of the palm-leaf manuscript in Siddham script, originally held at Hōryū-ji Temple, Japan; now located in the Tokyo National Museum at the Gallery of Hōryū—ji Treasure. The original copy may be the earliest extant Sanskrit manuscript of the Heart Sutra dated to the 7th–8th century CE. It also contains the Sanskrit text of the Uṣṇīṣa Vijaya Dhāraṇī Sūtra and the final line shows the Siddhaṃ abugida.

Siddhaṃ alphabet by Kūkai (774–835)

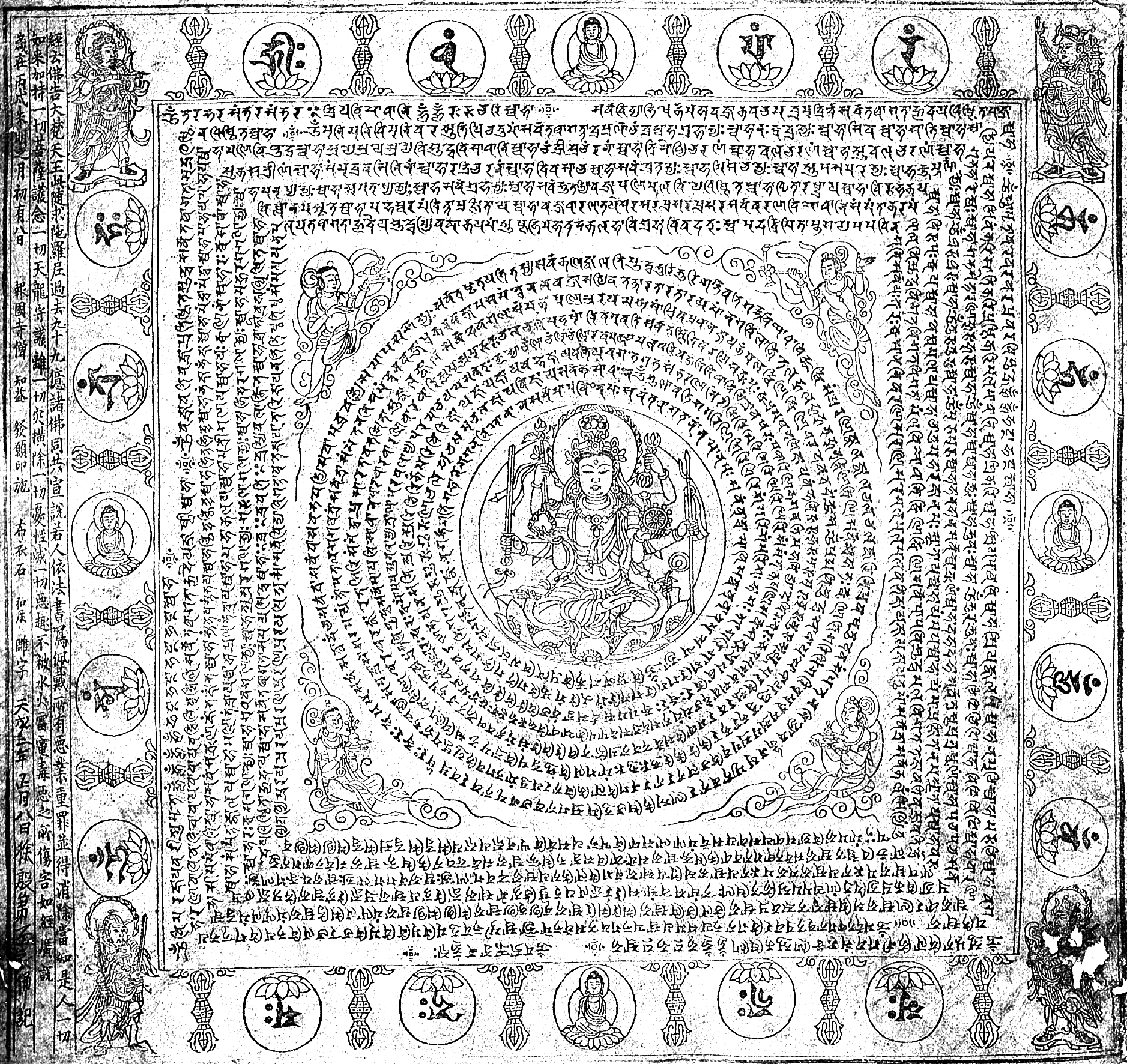
Chinese use of the Siddhaṃ script for the Pratisara mantra, from the Later Tang. 927 CE

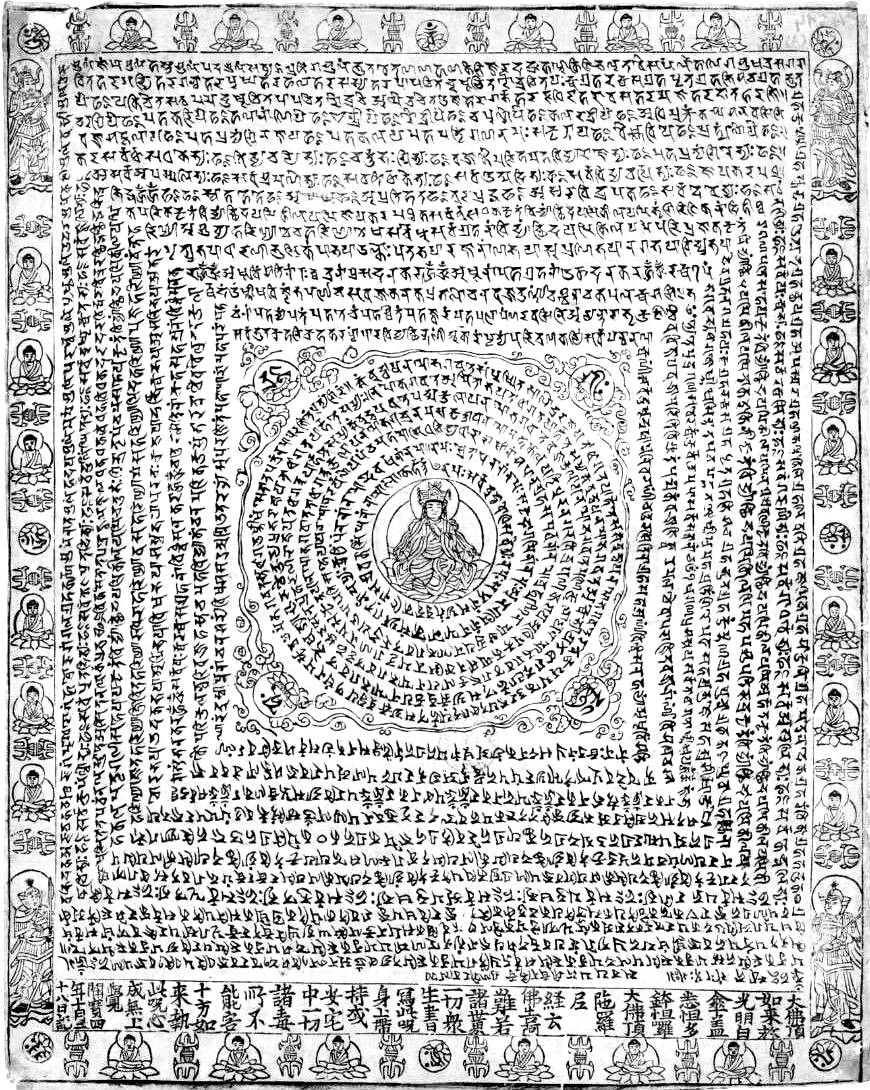
Chinese use of the Siddhaṃ script for the Śūraṅgama Mantra. 971 CE

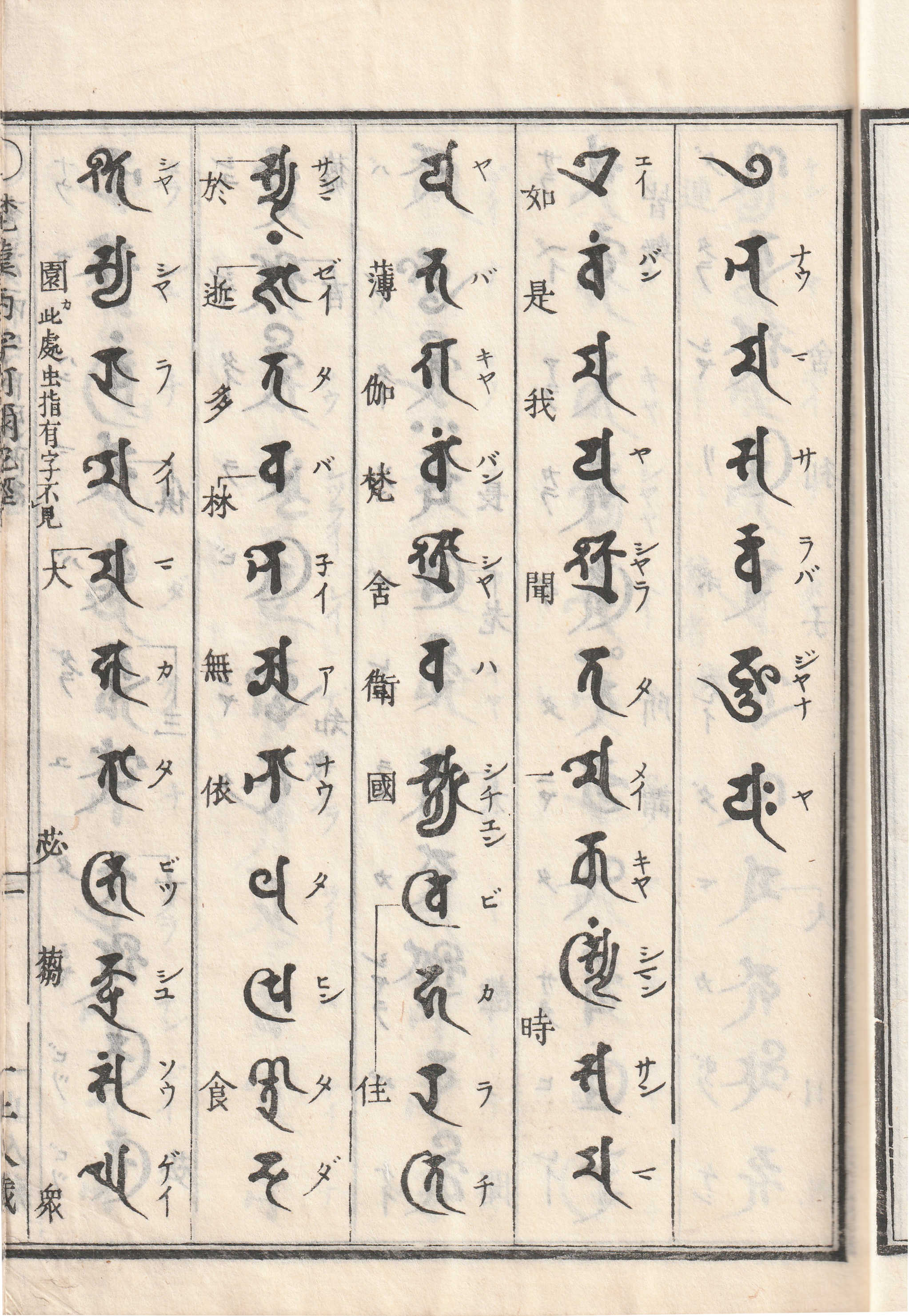
Shorter Sukhāvatīvyūha Sūtra written in katakana, Siddhaṃ script, and kanji. This book was published in 1773 in Japan.

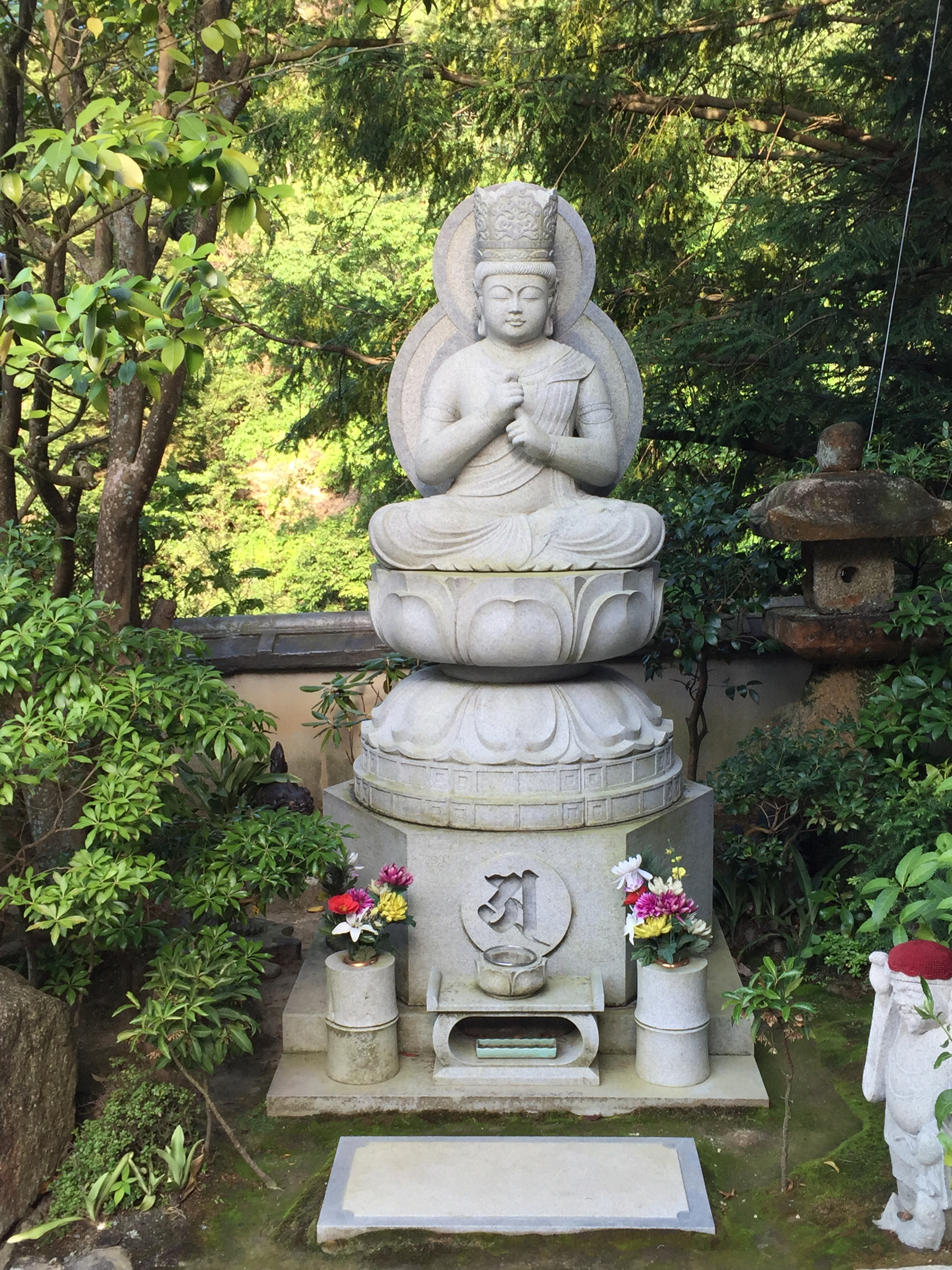
Siddhaṃ Bijakshara A, Daishō-in, Miyajima

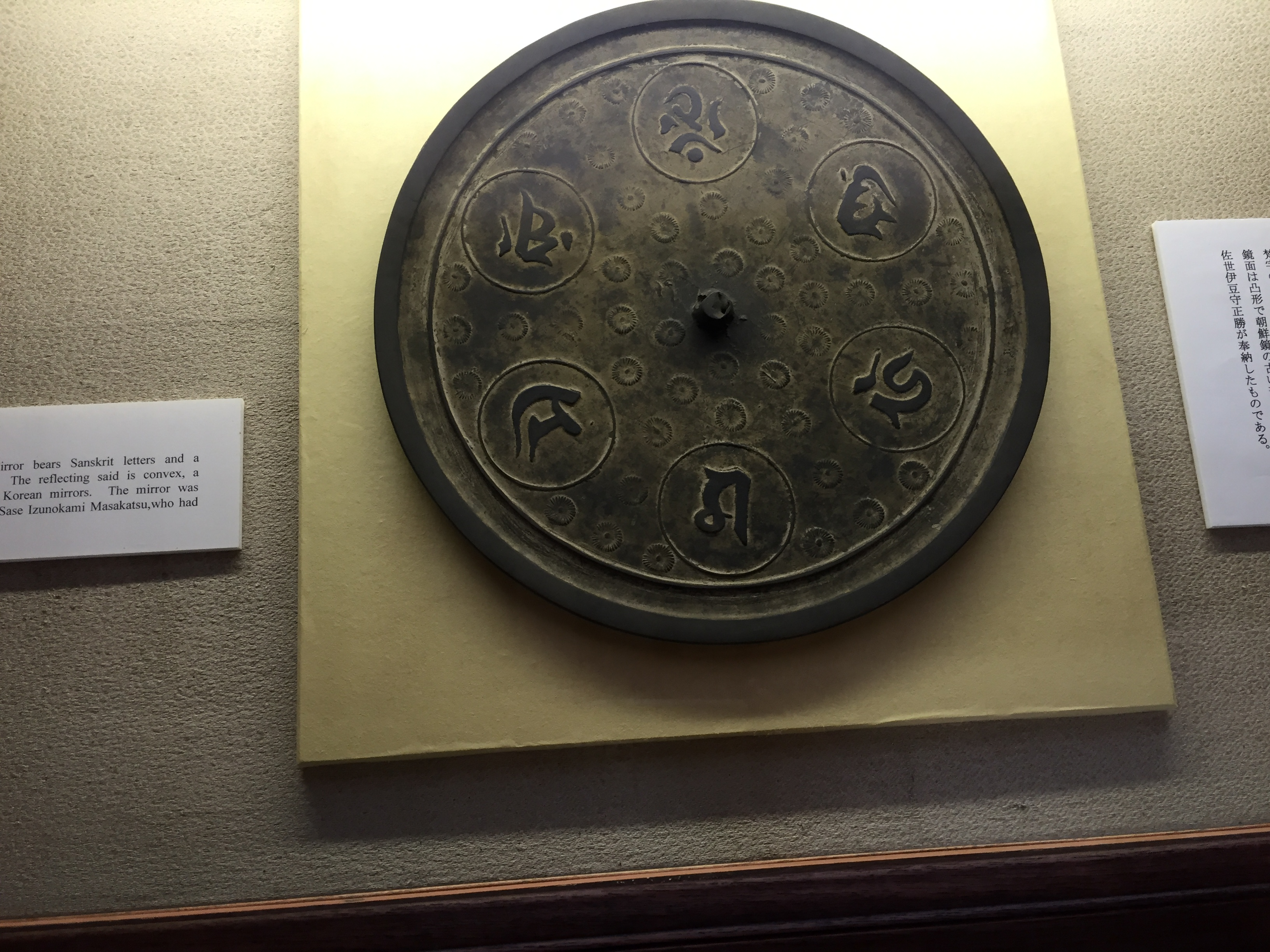
Mirror with bijaksharas, Miyajima

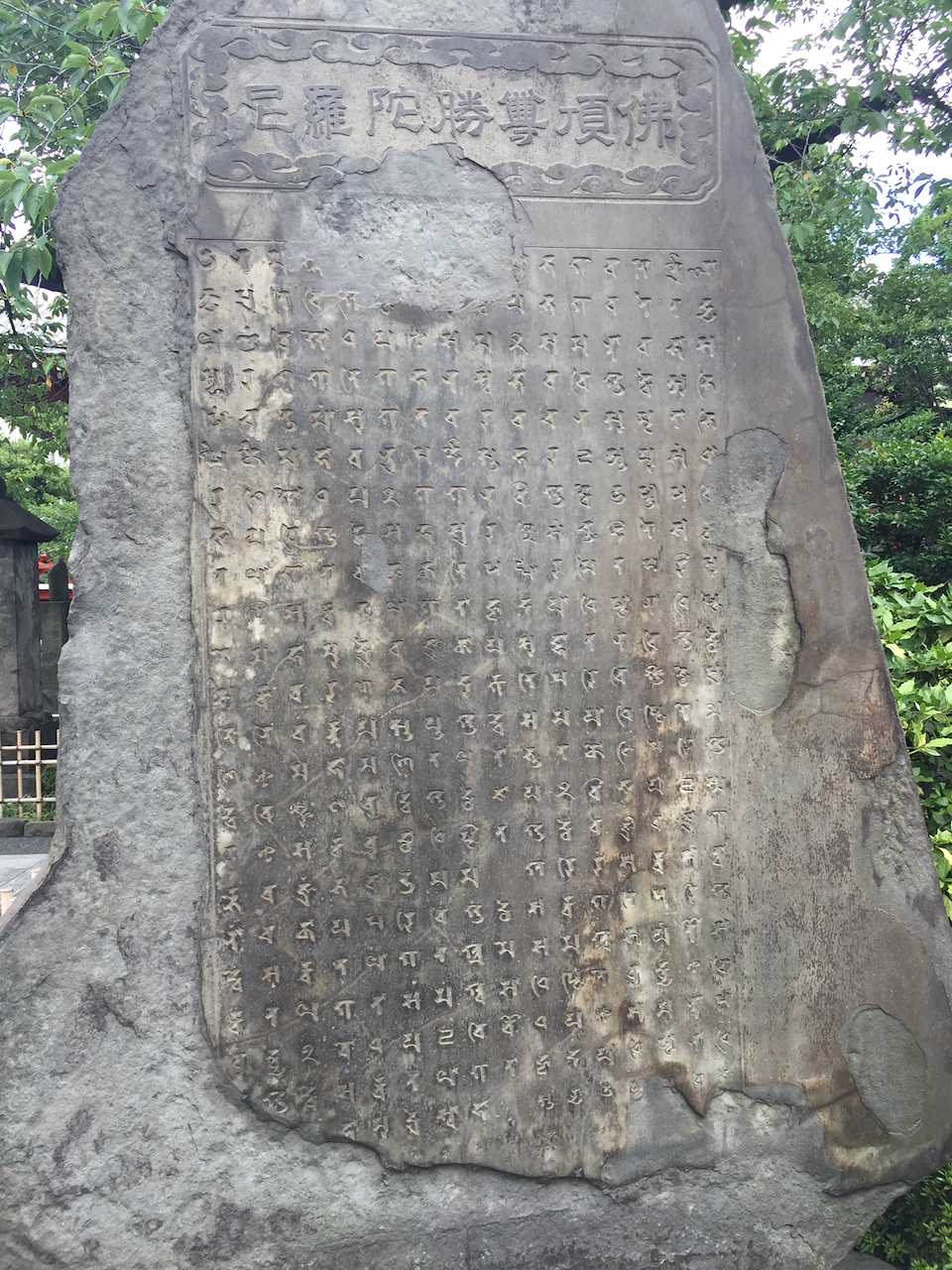
A stone inscription of the Buddhist Uṣṇīṣa Vijaya Dhāraṇī Sūtra at Asakusa Temple in Tokyo using Siddham script.

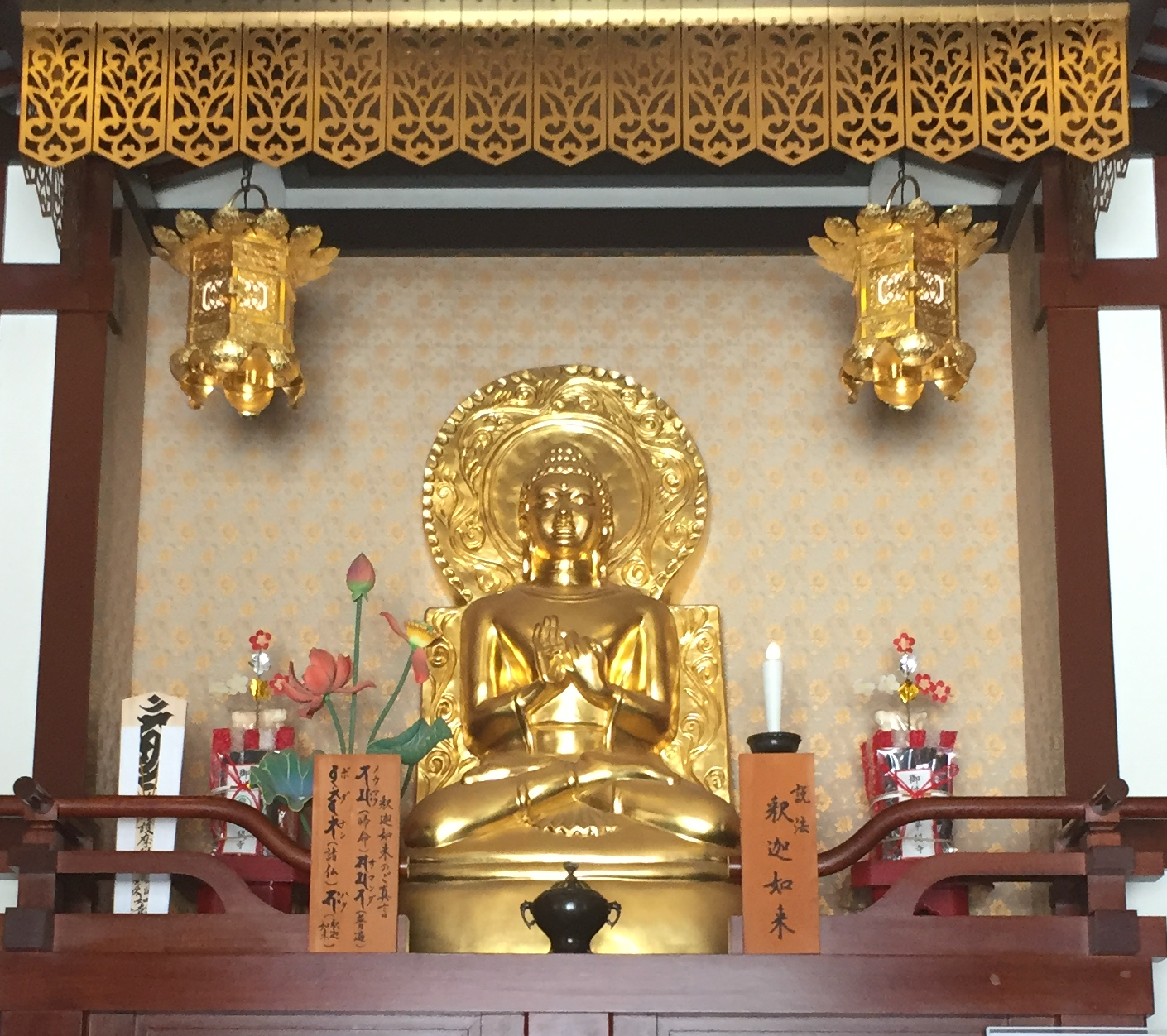
A Buddhist altar in Kawasaki, Japan showing a devotional mantra inscribed in Siddham to Shakyamuni Buddha with Japanese pronunciation guide
