= Ranjana script =

Abugida writing system

Rañjanā
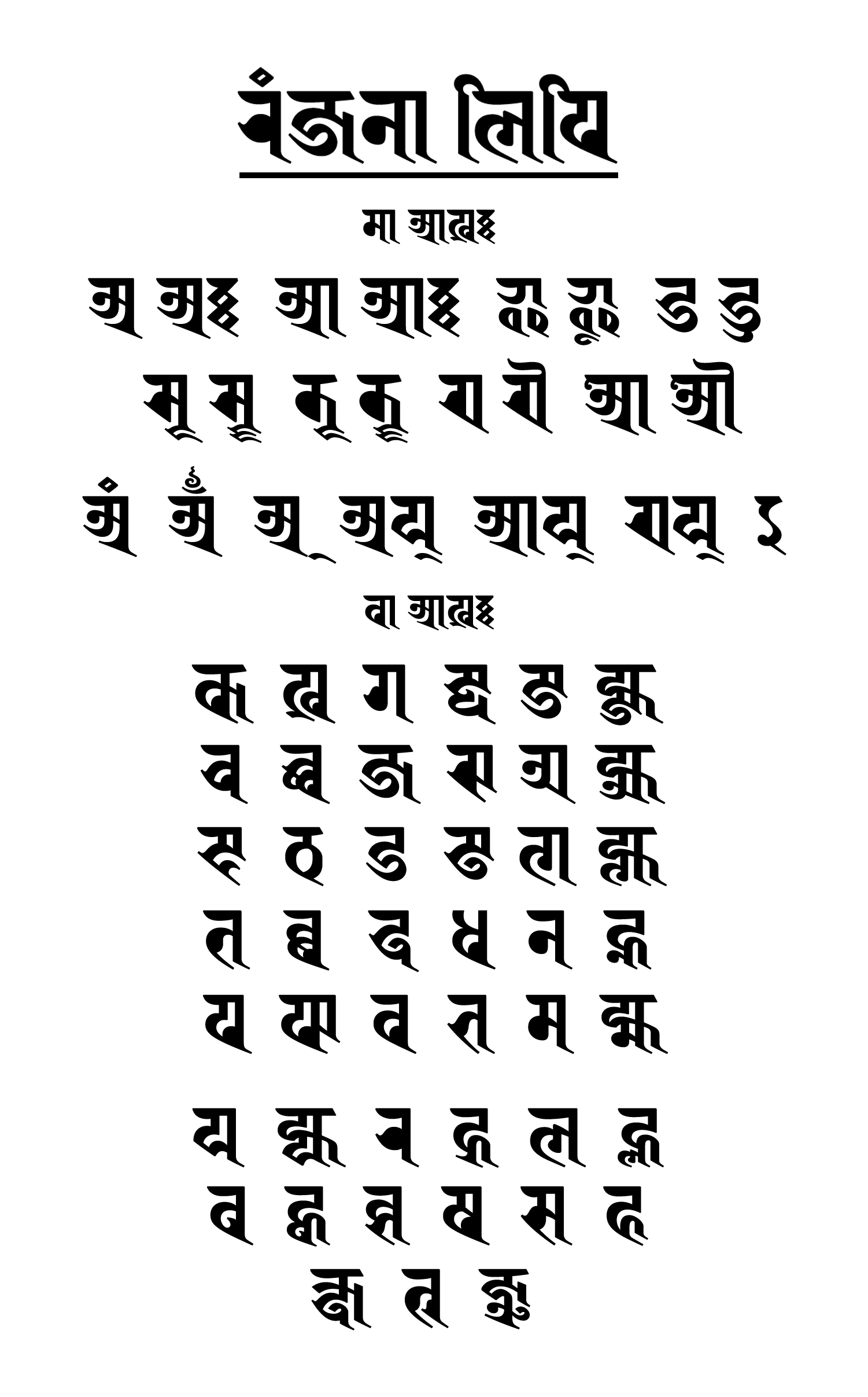
- Ranjana Varnamala Chart
- Script type: Abugida
- Period: c. 1100–present
- Direction: Left-to-right
- Region: Nepal Mandala
- Languages: Newari (Nepal Bhasa); Sanskrit

Related scripts
- Parent systems: Proto-Sinaitic script: Phoenician alphabet; Aramaic script; Brāhmī; Gupta; Siddham; Gaudi; Nepalese; Rañjanā
- Child systems: Soyombo
- Sister systems: Newar; Bhujimol

ISO 15924
- ISO 15924: Ranj (303), Ranjana

The Rañjanā script (Lantsa) is an abugida, one of the Nepalese scripts, used to write Sanskrit and Newari (Nepal Bhasa). It was used across regions from Nepal to Tibet by the Newar people, the historic inhabitants of the Kathmandu Valley, from the 11th century until the mid-20th century. Nowadays it is also used in Buddhist monasteries in China, Mongolia, and Japan. It is normally written from left to right but the Kutakshar form is written from top to bottom. It is also considered to be the standard Nepalese calligraphic script.

== History ==
Rañjanā is a Brahmic script which developed around 1100 CE. It was used in Nepal and is still used in Nepal by the Newar people to write the Newar language. The script is also used in most of the Mahayana and Vajrayana monasteries. Along with the Newar script, it is considered one of the scripts of Nepal. It is the formal script of Nepal duly registered in the United Nations while applying for free Nation status. The Aṣṭasāhasrikā Prajñāpāramitā Sūtra lettered in gold ink by Bhiksu Ananda of Kapitanagar and dating back to the Nepal Sambat year 345 (1215 CE) is an early example of the script.

After falling into disuse in the mid-20th century, the script has recently seen an increased use. It is used by many local governments such as those of Kathmandu Metropolitan City, Lalitpur Sub-Metropolitan City, Bhaktapur Municipality, Thimi Municipality, Kirtipur Municipality, Banepa Municipality, in signboards, letter pads, and such. Regular programs are held in the Kathmandu Valley to promote the script and training classes are held to preserve the language. The script is being endorsed by the Nepal Bhasa movement and is used for headings in newspapers and websites. A Nepalese-German project is trying to conserve the manuscripts of Rañjanā script.

== Alphabet ==
'Ranjana Lipi' in Ranjana script

=== Vowels ===
a अ	aḥ अः	ā आ	āḥ आः	i इ	ī ई	u उ	ū ऊ	ṛ ऋ	ṝ ॠ	
ḷ ऌ	ḹ ॡ	e ए	ai ऐ	o ओ	au औ	ã अँ	aṃ अं	ay अय्	āy आय्	ey एय्

=== Consonants ===
k क	kh ख	g ग	gh घ	ṅ ङ
c च	ch छ	j ज	jh झ	ñ ञ
ṭ ट	ṭh ठ	ḍ ड	ḍh ढ	ṇ ण
t त	th थ	d द	dh ध	n न
p प	ph फ	b ब	bh भ	m म
y य	r र	l ल	v व	
ś श	ṣ ष	s स	h ह	

kṣ क्ष	tr त्र	jñ ज्ञ

=== Vowel diacritics ===
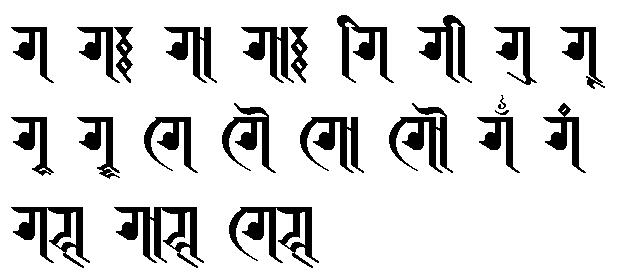
Vowel diacritic of Ranjana letter 'ग'.

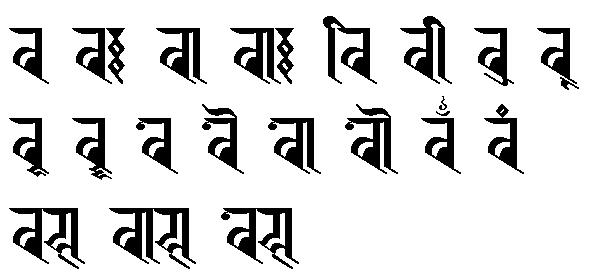
Vowel diacritic of Ranjana letter 'ब'.

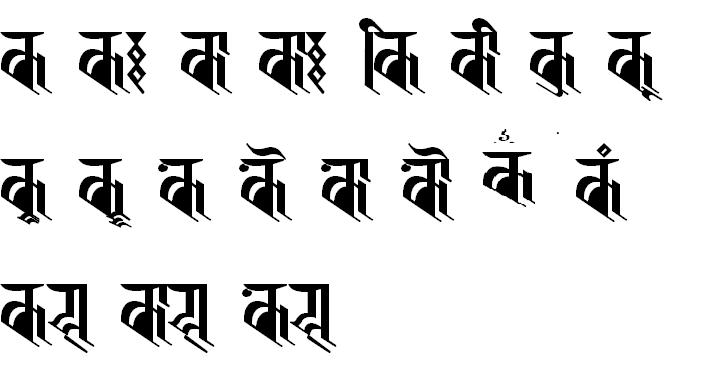
Vowel diacritic of Ranjana letter 'क'.

The shape of the combining marks indicating the vowels आ ā, ए e, ऐ ai/ē,ओ o, and औ au/ō in Ranjana script take a different form when combined with the eight consonants ख kha, ग ga, n ञ nya, ठ ṭha ण ṇa, थ tha, ध dha or श sha(or where one of these is the first consonant in a combination) (In addition the vertical marks indicating आ ā or ī may take a shorter form when combined with the consonants क ka, ज्ञ ja, or ठ ṭha.)

== Numerals ==
0 ०	1 १	2 २	3 ३	4 ४	5 ५	6 ६	7 ७	8 ८	9 ९

== Use ==
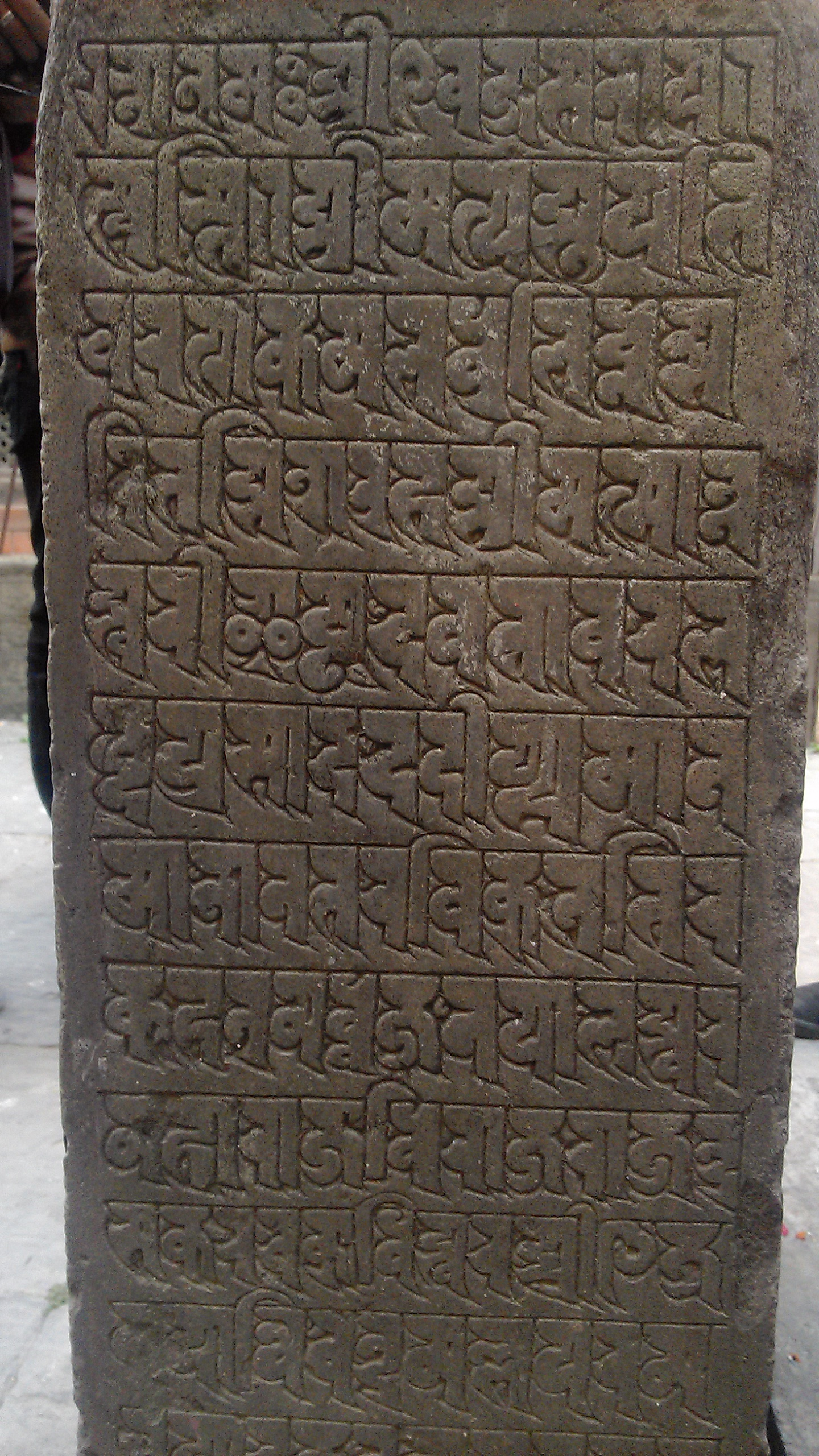
Parthibendra Malla’s stone inscription in the Ranjana script at Lagan Bahal.

Letter of Ming Dynasty's Yongle Emperor of China to Shaktisimha Rama of Nepal, Ranjana script, 1415 CE.

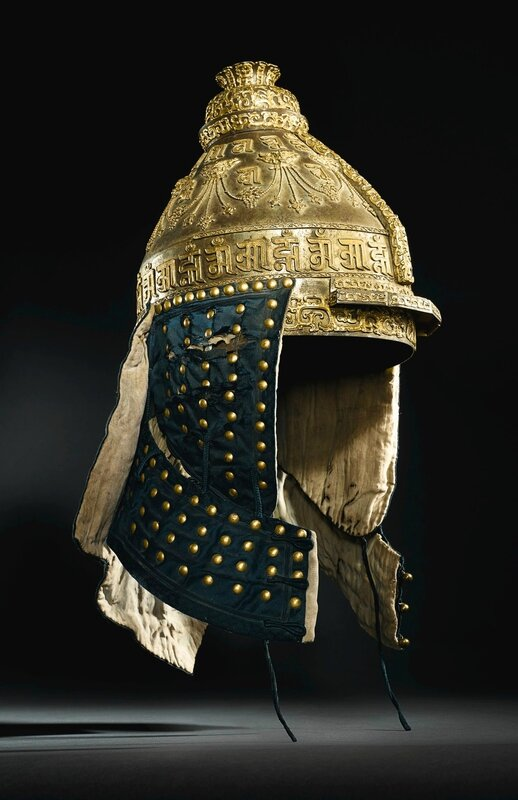
Imperial parcel-gilt iron helmet with Ranjana characters, Qing dynasty, 18th century.

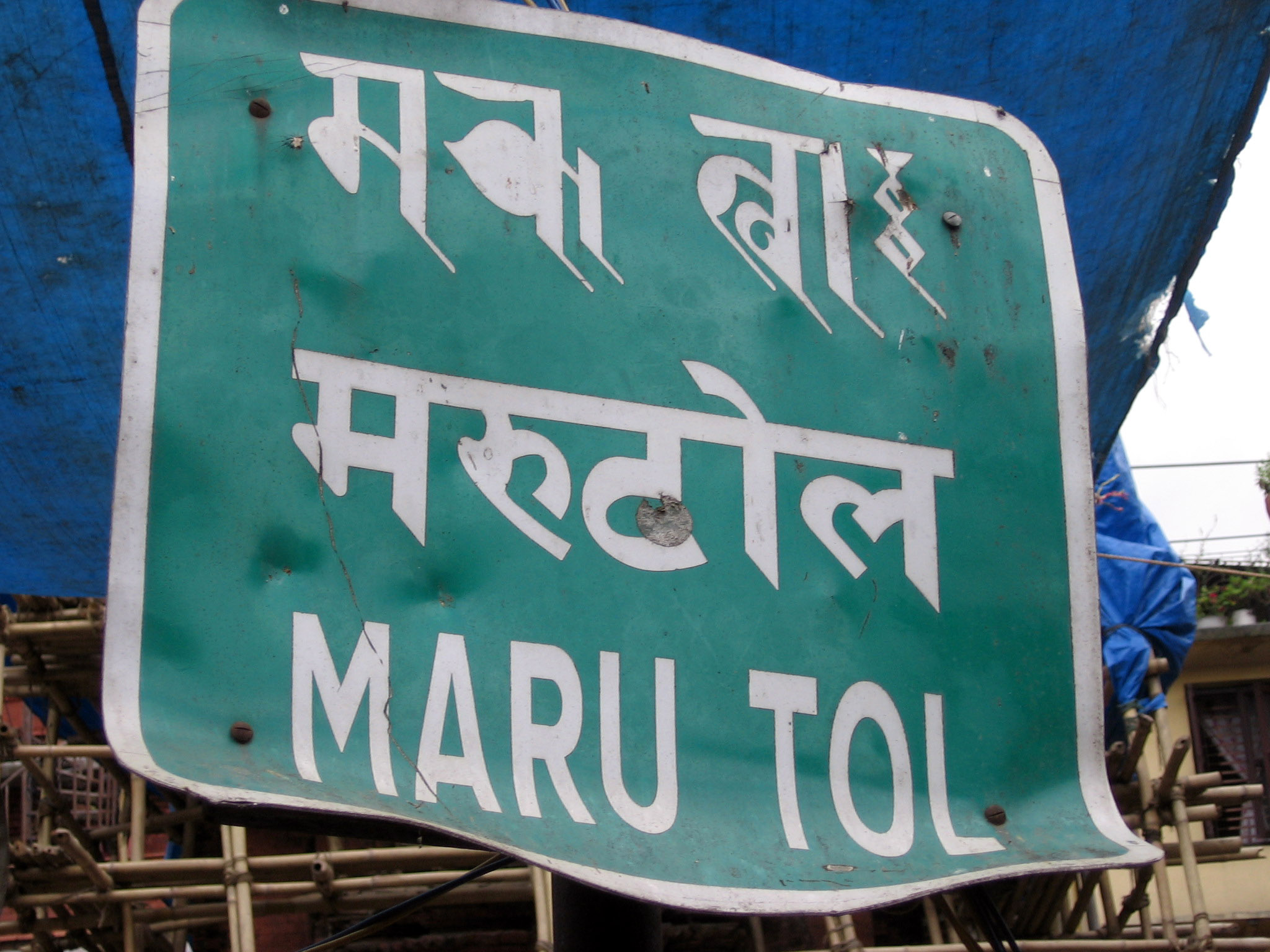
Street sign in Kathmandu in Ranjana, Devanagari and English.

=== Use in Nepal ===
Rañjana is mostly used for printing Hindu and Buddhist scriptures and literature in Sanskrit and Buddhist Hybrid Sanskrit by the Newar community in Kathmandu Valley. Rañjana is also in current use for printing "high status" documents (wedding invitations, certificates, etc.) in Nepal in the Newar language and for Newar language book titles. In Mahayana and Vajrayana Buddhist traditions, it is famously used to write various mantras including the "Om mani padme hum" mantra of Avalokiteśvara, the mantra of Tara: "Om tare tuttare ture svaha", and the mantra of Manjusri: "Om a ra pa ca na dhi." The script is also used in Hindu scriptures.

=== Use in East Asia ===
In Chinese Buddhism and other East Asian Buddhism, the standard Sanskrit script for mantras and dhāraṇīs was not the Rañjanā script, but rather the earlier Siddhaṃ script that was widely propagated in China during the Tang dynasty. However, in late Imperial China, the influence of Tibetan Buddhism popularized the Rañjanā script as well, and so this script is also found throughout East Asia, but is not as common as Siddhaṃ. In Vietnam, Rañjanā script is often used during Buddhist rituals especially by monks in the central region such as Huế. Talismans are often made using Rañjanā mantras read "Om mani padme hum" or "Om cale cule cundi svaha" the mantra of Cundi Bodhisattva. The script has also been adopted by Vietnamese folk shamans in their use of amulets such as Lỗ Ban phái, a Taoist folk sect that arrived from China named after Lu Ban, patron god of carpenters.

=== Use in Tibet ===
When Rañjanā was introduced to Tibet, it was referred to as Lantsa (Tibetan: ལཉྫ་), which is simply a Tibetan transcription of the Sanskrit word Sanskrit: लञ्ज or Lañja (which means 'tail' or 'foot'). Lantsa varies somewhat from the standard Rañjanā as written in Nepal today. In particular the glyph shapes of some consonants and ligatures differs and vowel diacritics do not usually change with the consonants ख kha, ग ga, n ञ nya, ठ ṭha ण ṇa, ध dha श sha as described above~ with the sole exception of the letter ठ ṭha. The shape of the numerals or digits also differs.

In Tibet, the Lantsa variant is used to write Buddhist texts in Sanskrit. Examples of such texts include the Mañjuśrīnāmasamgīti, the Diamond Sutra and the Aṣṭasāhasrikā Prajñāpāramitā Sūtra. The Lantsa script is also found in manuscripts and printed editions of some Sanskrit-Tibetan lexicons such as the Mahāvyutpatti. and it is frequently used on the title pages of Tibetan texts, where the Sanskrit title is often written in Lantsa, followed by a transliteration and translation in the Tibetan script. The script is also used to prepare Mantra and Dharani inserted into Buddhist images and Stupa for consecration, as well as in the drawing of certain mandalas ( similar to the Japanese use of the Siddhaṃ script).

Lantsa is frequently seen on the outside of prayer wheels, and decoratively on the gateways, walls. beams and pillars of Tibetan temples and monasteries.

Numerous alternative spellings of the term Lantsa exist, including the following:

- Lanja
- Landzha
- Lantsha
- Lentsa
- Lendza

== Monogram (Kutākshar) ==
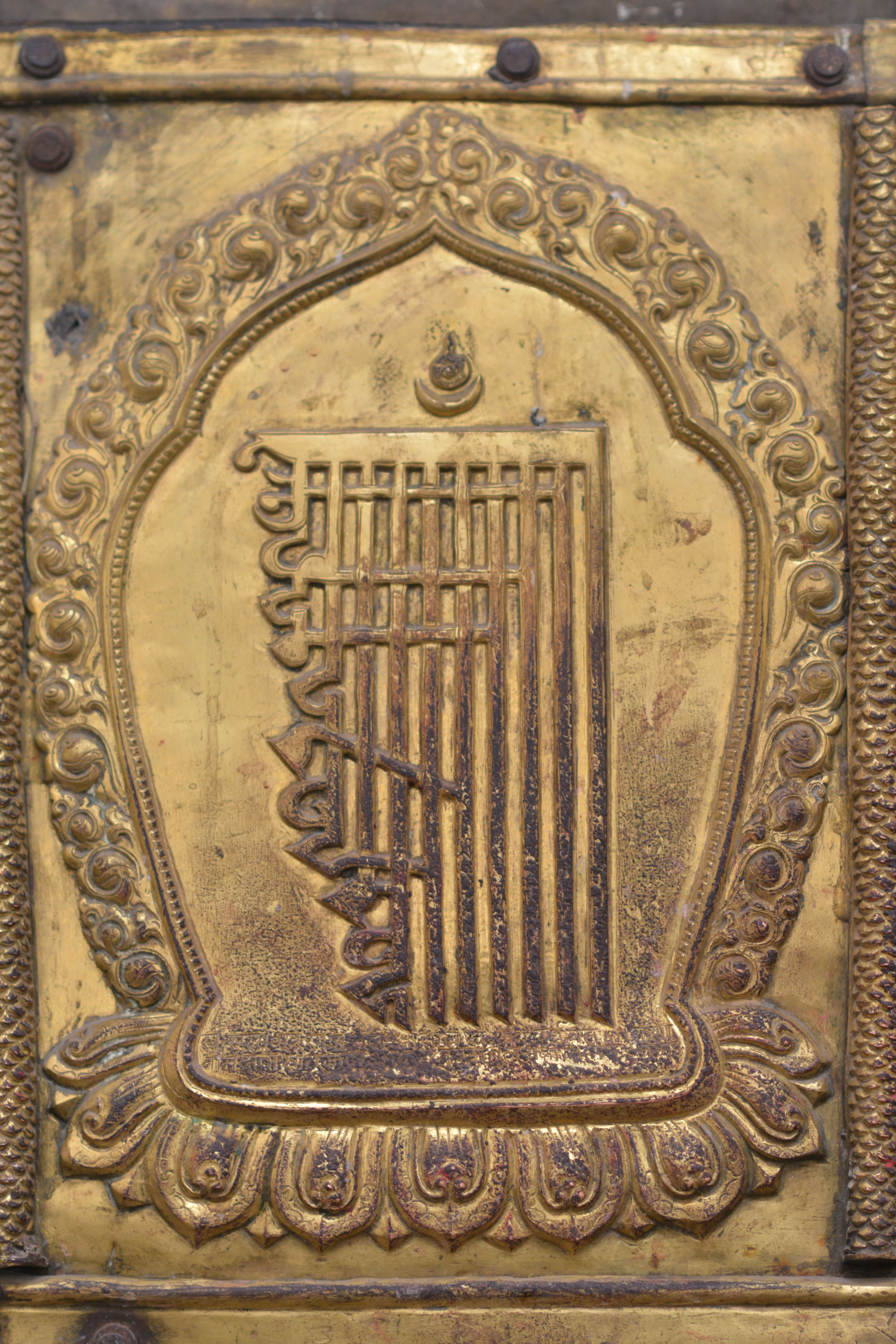
A Kutākshar monogram on the facade of the Jana Bahal.

Kutākshar is a monogram of the Ranjana script. It is only one of the Nepalese scripts that can be written in monogram.

== Unicode ==
A Unicode block for the script has first been proposed in 2009 by Michael Everson and updated in December 2013, and last revised with additional details in January 2023 by Anshuman Pandey.

== Gallery ==
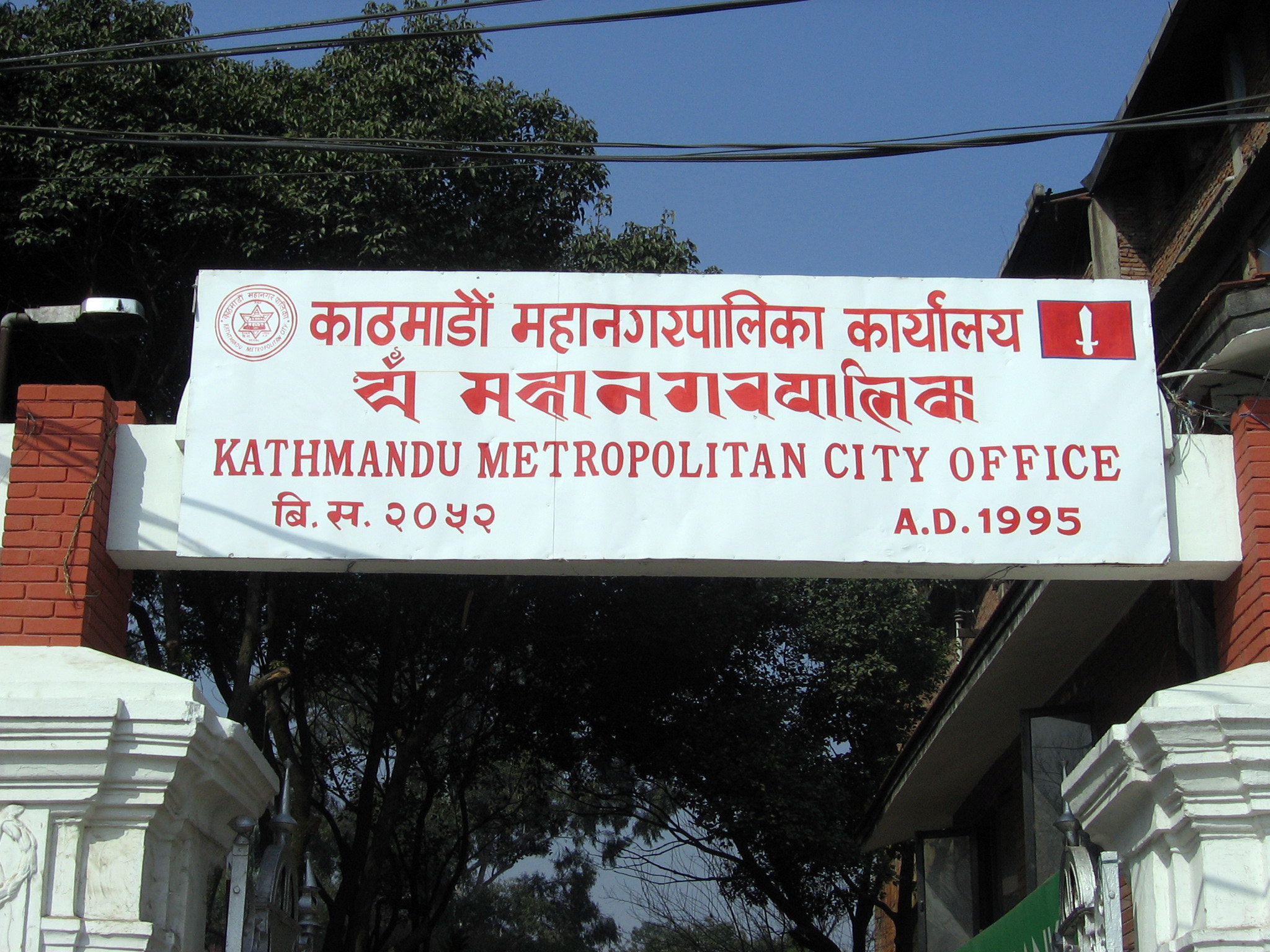
Signboard of Kathmandu Metropolitan City Office in Ranjana script (second row).

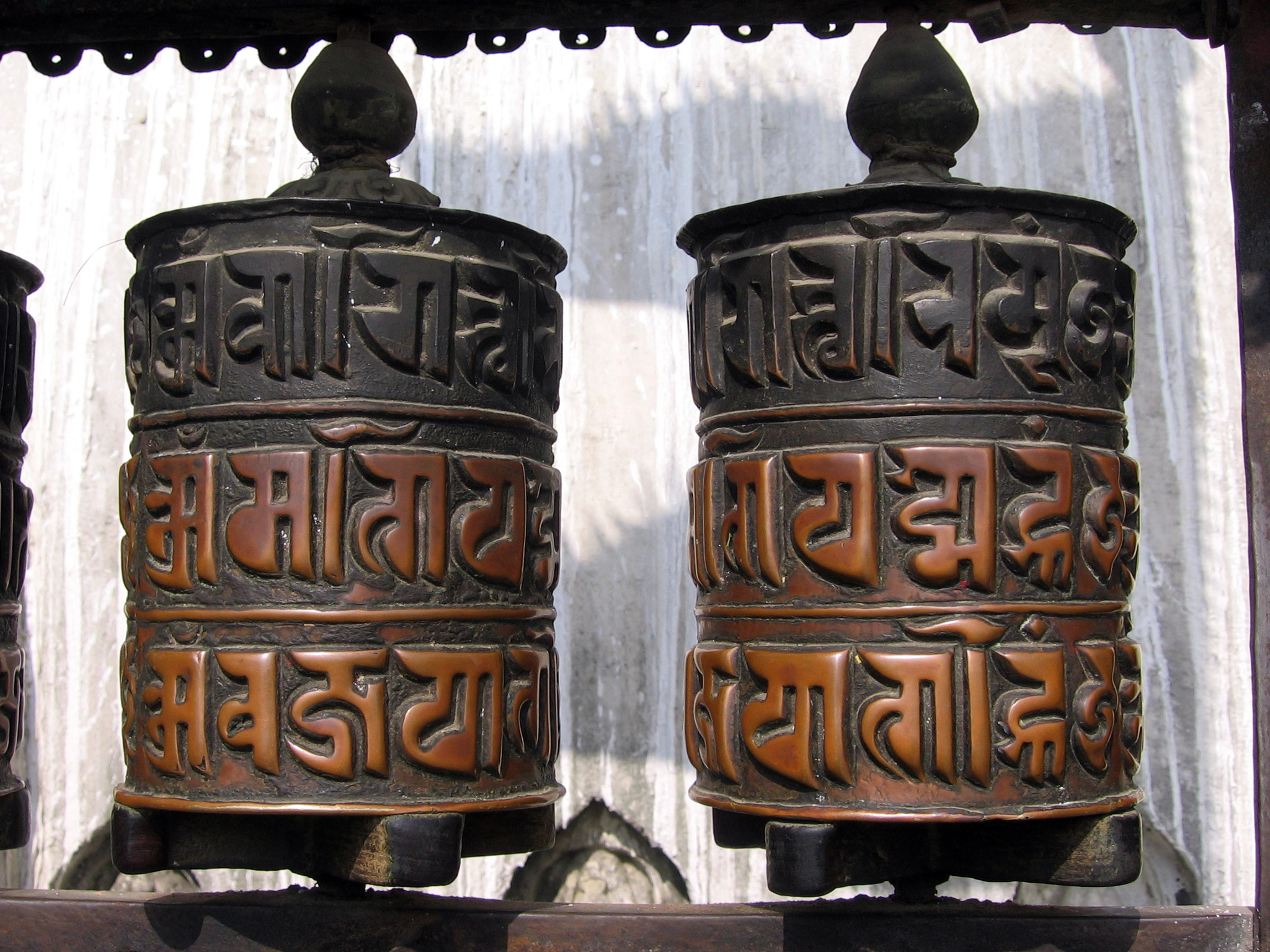
Prayer wheels with the mantras in Ranjana script at Swayambhunath.

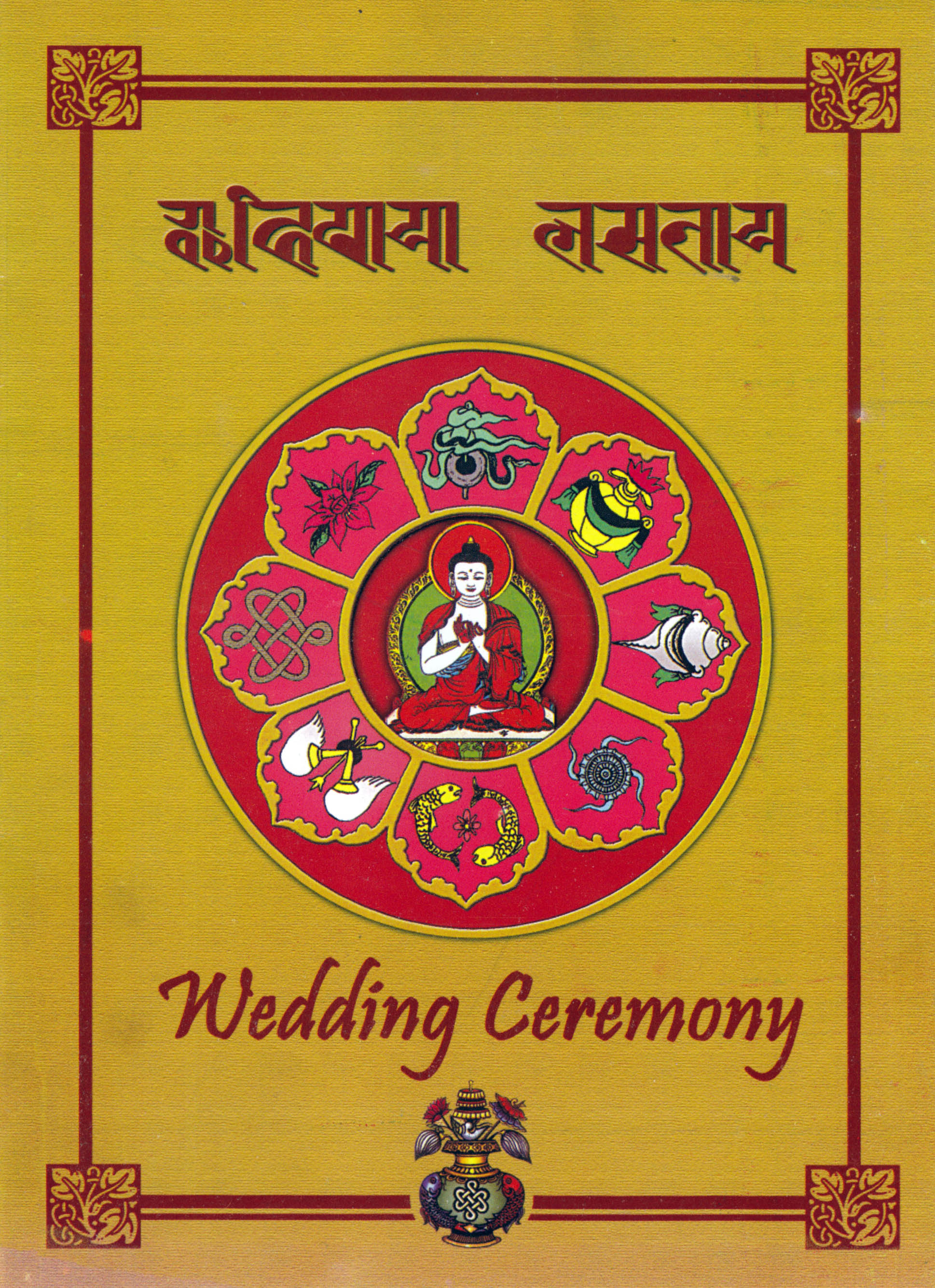
Ihipāyā Lasatāy written in Ranjana script on the invitation card.

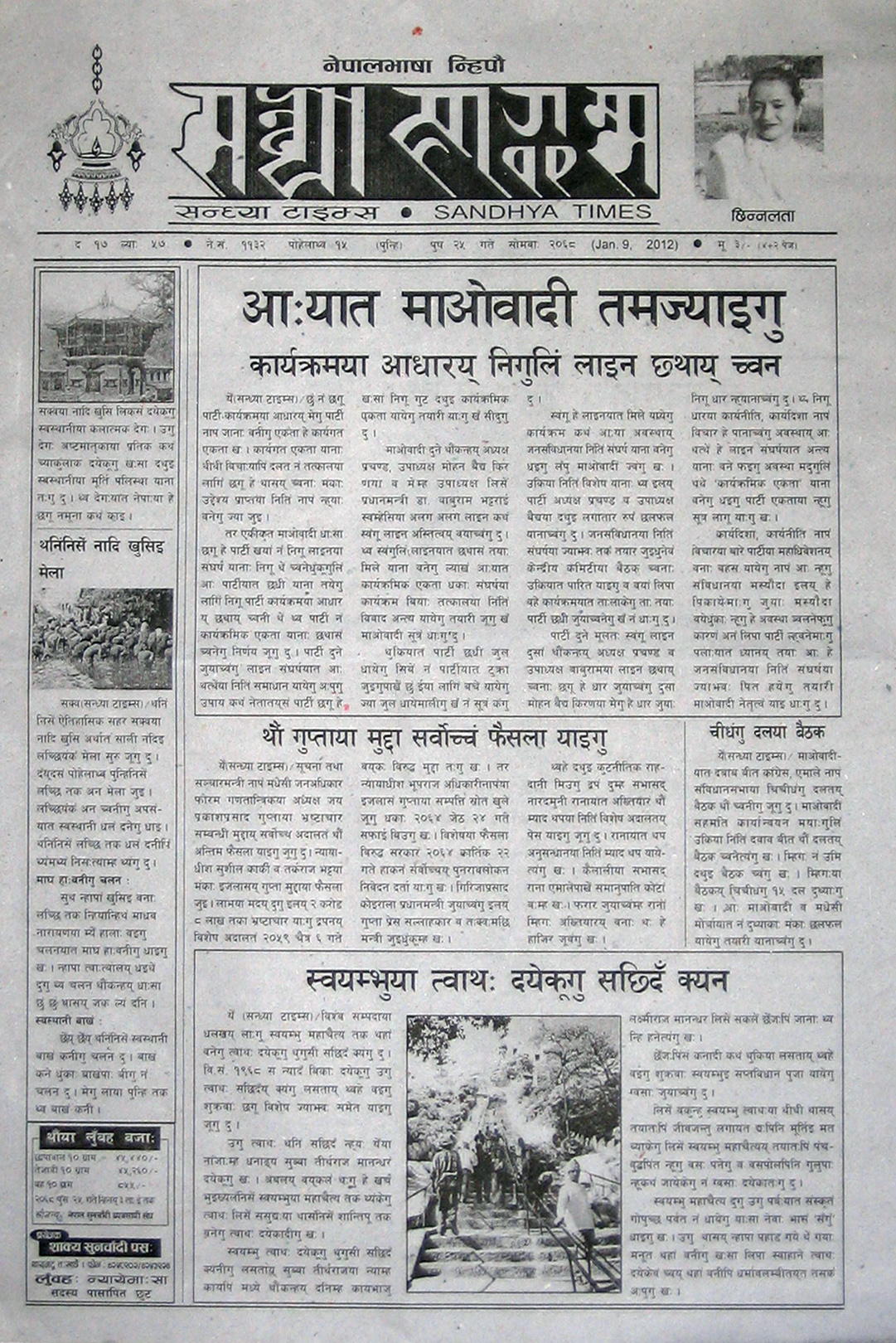
A Newar language Magazine Sandhya Times daily.

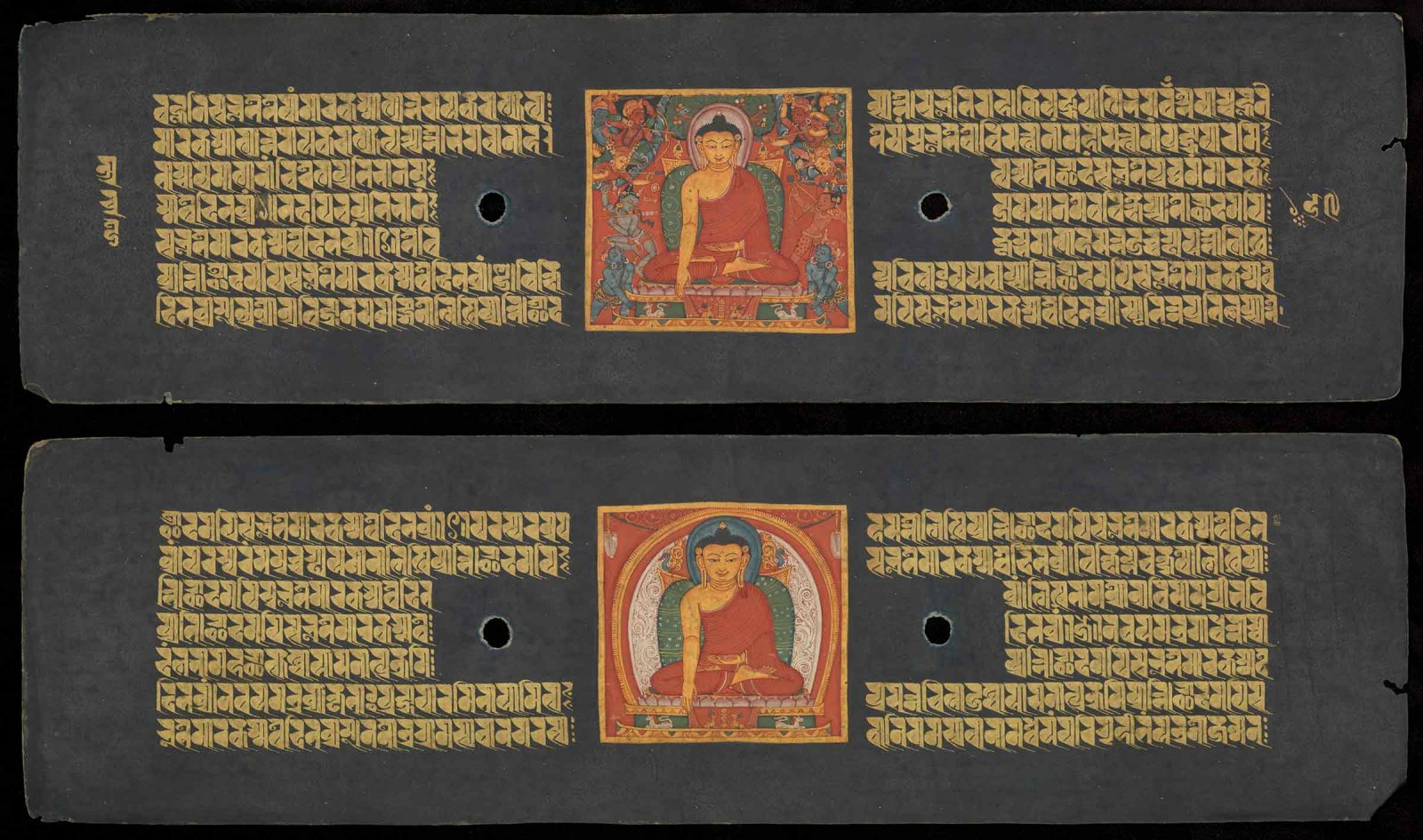
A Buddhist manuscript in the Rañjanā script from Nepal, 1317 CE.

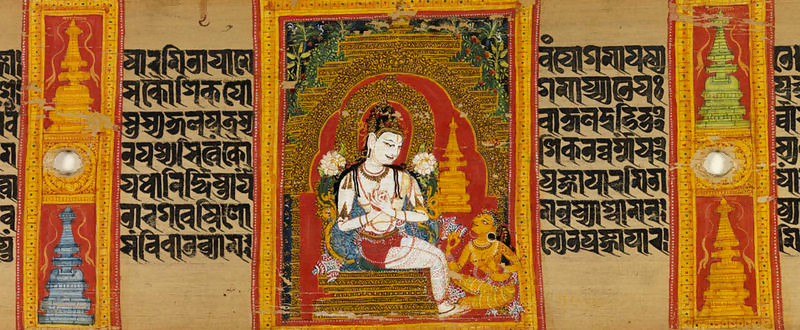
A manuscript of Aṣṭasāhasrikā Prajñāpāramitā Sūtra from India.

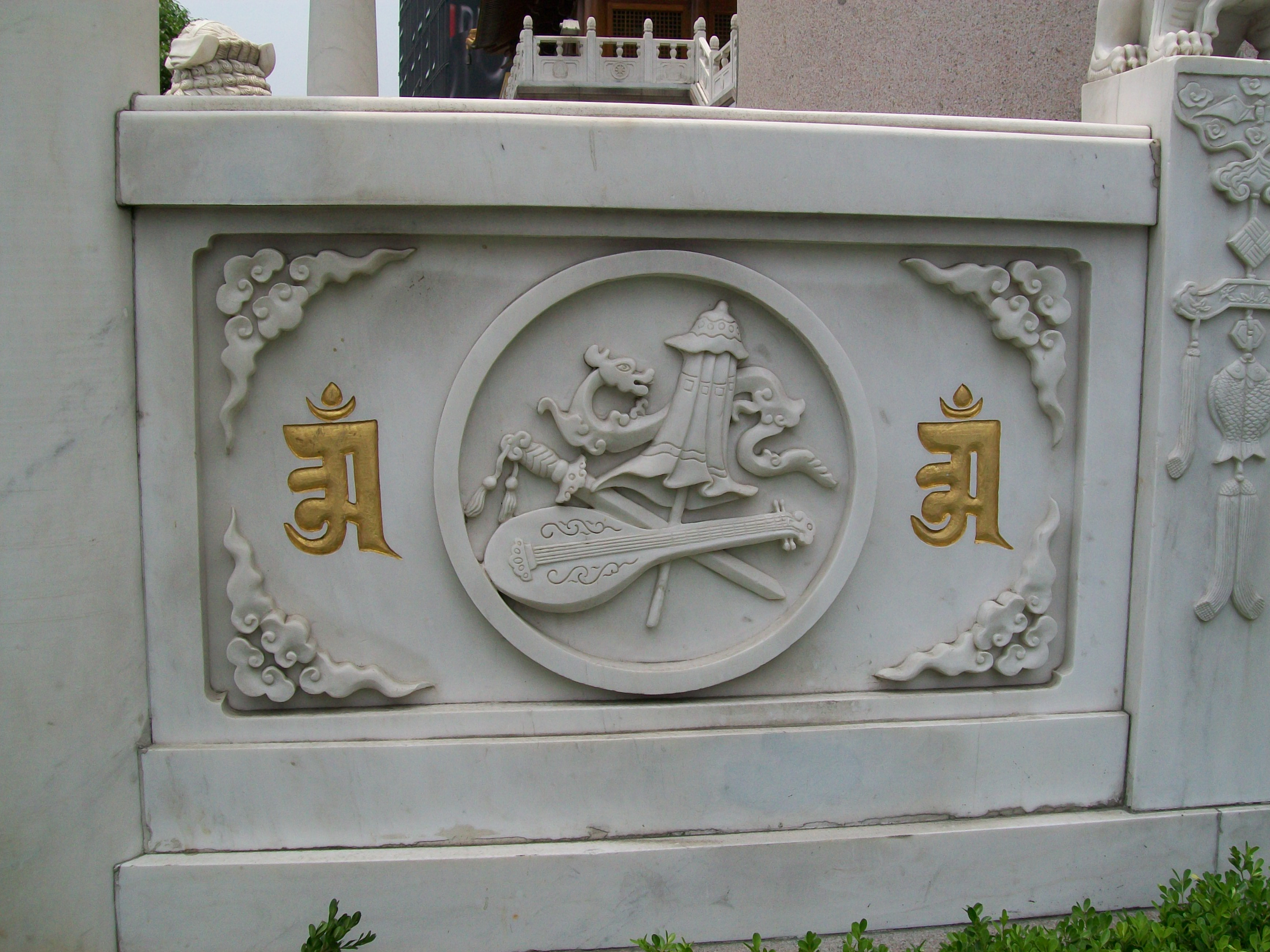
Rañjanā "Oṃ" syllables flanking the implements of the Four Heavenly Kings. Jing'an Temple, Shanghai, China.

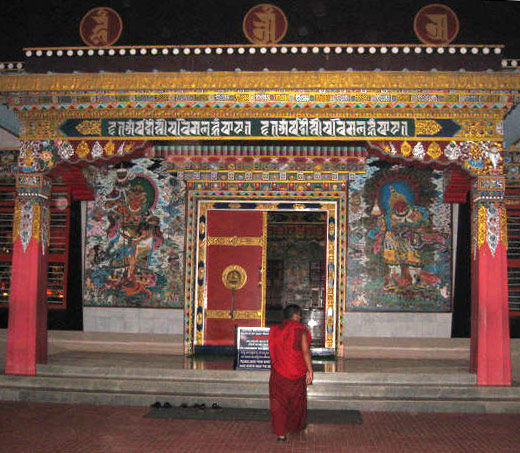
Nyingma Tibetan Buddhist temple with decorative use of the Lantsa variant of Rañjanā .
