= Siddham (Unicode block) =

- Range: U+11580..U+115FF (128 code points)
- Plane: SMP
- Scripts: Siddham
- Major alphabets: Siddham
- Assigned: 92 code points
- Unused: 36 reserved code points

Unicode version history
- 7.0 (2014): 72 (+72)
- 8.0 (2015): 92 (+20)

Unicode documentation
- Code chart ∣ Web page

Siddham is a Unicode block containing characters for the historical, Brahmi-derived Siddham script used for writing Sanskrit between the years c. 550 – c. 1200.

== Block ==
Siddham^{[1]}^{[2]} Official Unicode Consortium code chart (PDF)
	0	1	2	3	4	5	6	7	8	9	A	B	C	D	E	F
U+1158x	𑖀	𑖁	𑖂	𑖃	𑖄	𑖅	𑖆	𑖇	𑖈	𑖉	𑖊	𑖋	𑖌	𑖍	𑖎	𑖏
U+1159x	𑖐	𑖑	𑖒	𑖓	𑖔	𑖕	𑖖	𑖗	𑖘	𑖙	𑖚	𑖛	𑖜	𑖝	𑖞	𑖟
U+115Ax	𑖠	𑖡	𑖢	𑖣	𑖤	𑖥	𑖦	𑖧	𑖨	𑖩	𑖪	𑖫	𑖬	𑖭	𑖮	𑖯
U+115Bx	𑖰	𑖱	𑖲	𑖳	𑖴	𑖵			𑖸	𑖹	𑖺	𑖻	𑖼	𑖽	𑖾	𑖿
U+115Cx	𑗀	𑗁	𑗂	𑗃	𑗄	𑗅	𑗆	𑗇	𑗈	𑗉	𑗊	𑗋	𑗌	𑗍	𑗎	𑗏
U+115Dx	𑗐	𑗑	𑗒	𑗓	𑗔	𑗕	𑗖	𑗗	𑗘	𑗙	𑗚	𑗛	𑗜	𑗝		
U+115Ex																
U+115Fx																
Notes: 1. As of Unicode version 16.0; 2. Grey areas indicate non-assigned code points

== History ==
The following Unicode-related documents record the purpose and process of defining specific characters in the Siddham block:

Version	Final code points (Note: Proposed code points and characters names may differ from final code points and names)	Count	L2 ID	WG2 ID	Document
7.0	U+11580..115B5, 115B8..115C9	72	L2/99-065		Everson, Michael (1999-02-11), Exploratory code chart for Siddham
7.0	U+11580..115B5, 115B8..115C9	72	L2/12-031		Anderson, Deborah; McGowan, Rick; Whistler, Ken (2012-01-27), "IX: SIDDHAM", Review of Indic-related L2 documents and Recommendations to the UTC
7.0	U+11580..115B5, 115B8..115C9	72	L2/12-011R	N4185	Pandey, Anshuman (2012-05-03), Preliminary Proposal to Encode the Siddham Script in ISO/IEC 10646
7.0	U+11580..115B5, 115B8..115C9	72	L2/12-184		Lata, Swaran (2012-05-07), GOI Feedback on the various Indic related documents
7.0	U+11580..115B5, 115B8..115C9	72	L2/12-221	N4506	Rajan, Vinodh; Sharma, Shriramana (2012-06-28), Comments on naming the "Siddham" encoding
7.0	U+11580..115B5, 115B8..115C9	72	L2/12-237	N4507	Baums, Stefan; Glass, Andrew (2012-07-11), Comments on the name of the "Siddham" script
7.0	U+11580..115B5, 115B8..115C9	72	L2/12-267		Anderson, Deborah; McGowan, Rick; Whistler, Ken (2012-07-21), "I. SIDDHAM", Review of Indic-related documents and Recommendations to the UTC
7.0	U+11580..115B5, 115B8..115C9	72	L2/12-274		Sharma, Shriramana (2012-07-25), Recommendation against encoding ornamental punctuation marks for Siddham
7.0	U+11580..115B5, 115B8..115C9	72	L2/12-279		Eidson, Eijun; Harada-Eidson, Shoken (2012-07-25), Comments of support for the adoption of Proposal to Encode the Siddham Script
7.0	U+11580..115B5, 115B8..115C9	72	L2/12-281		Yoritomi, Honkō (2012-07-25), Comments of support for the adoption of "Proposal to Encode the Siddham Script in ISO/IEC 10646"
7.0	U+11580..115B5, 115B8..115C9	72	L2/12-277		Lata, Swaran (2012-07-26), GOI Feedback on the various Indic related document submitted to UTC
7.0	U+11580..115B5, 115B8..115C9	72	L2/12-234R	N4294	Pandey, Anshuman (2012-08-01), Proposal to Encode the Siddham Script
7.0	U+11580..115B5, 115B8..115C9	72	L2/12-239		Moore, Lisa (2012-08-14), "D.6.2", UTC #132 Minutes
7.0	U+11580..115B5, 115B8..115C9	72	L2/12-367	N4361	Suzuki, Toshiya (2012-11-02), Feedback on Siddham proposal (WG2 N4294)
7.0	U+11580..115B5, 115B8..115C9	72	L2/12-369	N4369	Eidson, Eijun (2012-11-02), Feedback on Siddham proposal (WG2 N4294)
7.0	U+11580..115B5, 115B8..115C9	72		N4460	Siddham ad hoc report, 2013-06-12
7.0	U+11580..115B5, 115B8..115C9	72	L2/13-132		Moore, Lisa (2013-07-29), "Consensus 136-C7", UTC #136 Minutes, "Change the names of two Siddham punctuation marks"
8.0	U+115CA..115D7	14	L2/12-323	N4336	Pandey, Anshuman (2012-09-30), Proposal to Encode Section Marks for Siddham in ISO/IEC 10646
8.0	U+115CA..115D7	14	L2/12-372	N4378	Anderson, Deborah (2012-10-24), Additional Information on Siddham Section Marks (N4336)
8.0	U+115CA..115D7	14	L2/13-028		Anderson, Deborah; McGowan, Rick; Whistler, Ken; Pournader, Roozbeh (2013-01-28), "15", Recommendations to UTC on Script Proposals
8.0	U+115CA..115D7	14	L2/13-033R	N4391	Eidson, Bill (2013-01-28), Additional information on Siddham Section marks
8.0	U+115CA..115D7	14	L2/13-011		Moore, Lisa (2013-02-04), "D.4", UTC #134 Minutes
8.0	U+115CA..115D7	14	L2/13-156	N4457	Anderson, Deborah; et al. (2013-06-11), Name changes for Siddham Section marks
8.0	U+115CA..115D7	14	L2/13-132		Moore, Lisa (2013-07-29), "Consensus 136-C15", UTC #136 Minutes, "Approve the revised repertoire of 14 Siddham section marks ..."
8.0	U+115CA..115D7	14		N4403 (pdf, doc)	Umamaheswaran, V. S. (2014-01-28), "Resolution M61.01 and M61.09 item a", Unconfirmed minutes of WG 2 meeting 61, Holiday Inn, Vilnius, Lithuania; 2013-06-10/14
8.0	U+115D8..115DD	6	L2/13-110	N4407R	Kawabata, Taichi; Suzuki, Toshiya; Nagasaki, Kiyonori; Shimoda, Masahiro (2013-06-11), Proposal to Encode Variants for Siddham Script
8.0	U+115D8..115DD	6	L2/13-136	N4468	Pandey, Anshuman (2013-06-15), Additional Siddham Variants
8.0	U+115D8..115DD	6	L2/13-165		Anderson, Deborah; Whistler, Ken; Pournader, Roozbeh (2013-07-25), "7", Recommendations to UTC on Script Proposals
8.0	U+115D8..115DD	6	L2/13-189	N4486	Glass, Andrew (2013-10-10), Comments on N4407R Proposal to Encode Variants for Siddham Script
8.0	U+115D8..115DD	6	L2/13-195	N4490	Pandey, Anshuman (2013-10-27), A Practical Approach to Encoding Siddham Variants
8.0	U+115D8..115DD	6	L2/13-208		Sharma, Shriramana (2013-10-30), Response to L2/13-195 on Siddham
8.0	U+115D8..115DD	6	L2/13-210		Anderson, Deborah; Whistler, Ken; McGowan, Rick; Pournader, Roozbeh (2013-10-31), "5", Recommendations to UTC #137 November 2013 on Script Proposals
8.0	U+115D8..115DD	6	L2/13-233 (html, Attach 1, Attach 2, Attach 3)	N4523	Lunde, Ken (2013-12-04), 2013-11-22 Siddham Script (梵字) Meeting @ Tokyo, JAPAN, Earth
8.0	U+115D8..115DD	6	L2/14-053		Anderson, Deborah; Whistler, Ken; McGowan, Rick; Pournader, Roozbeh; Iancu, Laurențiu (2014-01-26), "20", Recommendations to UTC #138 February 2014 on Script Proposals
8.0	U+115D8..115DD	6		N4403 (pdf, doc)	Umamaheswaran, V. S. (2014-01-28), "Resolution M61.09 item a", Unconfirmed minutes of WG 2 meeting 61, Holiday Inn, Vilnius, Lithuania; 2013-06-10/14
8.0	U+115D8..115DD	6	L2/14-055		Anderson, Deborah; Collins, Lee; Eidson, Bill; Glass, Andrew; Harada, Shoken; Kawabata, Taichi; Lunde, Ken; Motoyama, Koju; Nagasaki, Kiyonori; Pandey, Anshuman; Suignard, Michel; Suzuki, Toshiya; Yamamoto, Taro (2014-02-04), Supplementary Documents for Proposal of Variants for Siddham Script
8.0	U+115D8..115DD	6	L2/14-062		Glass, Andrew (2014-02-04), Concerns about encoding variants of Matras in Siddham
8.0	U+115D8..115DD	6		N4557	Toshiya, Suzuki (2014-02-24), Brief Summary of the Discussion about Shape-Based Separation of Siddham Vowel Sign U/UU
8.0	U+115D8..115DD	6	L2/14-074	N4560	Anderson, Deborah (2014-02-24), Siddham Ad Hoc Report
8.0	U+115D8..115DD	6	L2/14-100		Moore, Lisa (2014-05-13), "Consensus 139-C11, 139-C12", UTC #139 Minutes
8.0	U+115D8..115DD	6		N4553 (pdf, doc)	Umamaheswaran, V. S. (2014-09-16), "M62.01e, M62.01j", Minutes of WG 2 meeting 62 Adobe, San Jose, CA, USA
