= Newar script =

Nepalese script

Newar 𑐣𑐾𑐥𑐵𑐮 𑐮𑐶𑐥𑐶 𑐣𑐾𑐥𑐵𑐮𑐵𑐎𑑂𑐲𑐬 (Nepālākṣar)
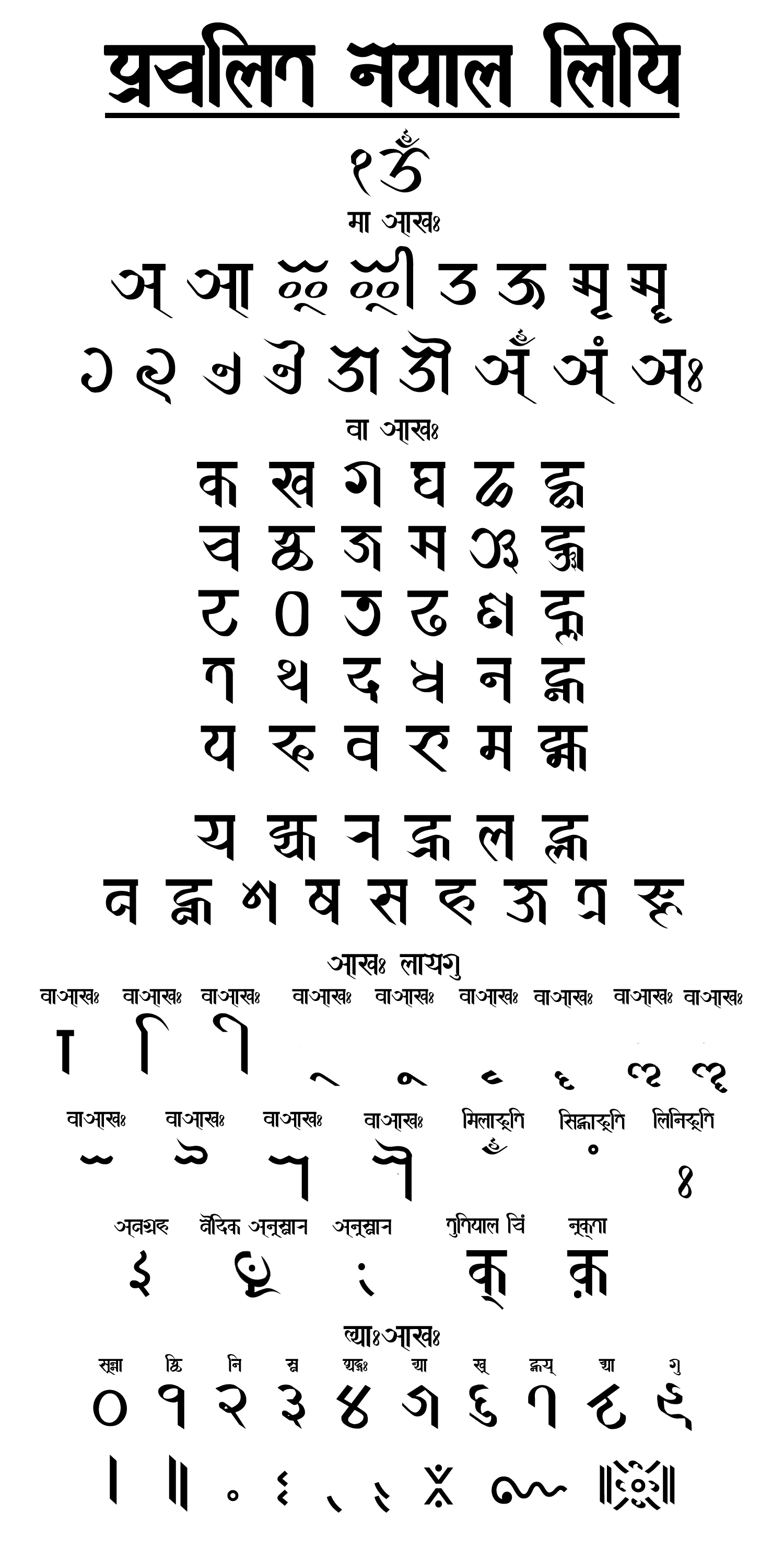
- Nepal lipi Varnamala Chart
- Script type: Abugida
- Period: 10th century to present
- Direction: Left-to-right
- Languages: Nepal Bhasa & Sanskrit

Related scripts
- Parent systems: Proto-Sinaitic script: Phoenician alphabet; Aramaic script; Brāhmī; Gupta; Siddham; Gaudi; Nepalese; Newar
- Sister systems: Ranjana; Bhujimol

ISO 15924
- ISO 15924: Newa (333), Newa, Newar, Newari, Nepāla lipi

Unicode
- Unicode alias: Newa
- Unicode range: U+11400–U+1147F

The Newar script, known in the Newar language as Nepal lipi, Nepalakshar and Prachalit, is an abugida, one of the Nepalese scripts that descend from the Brahmi script. It is primarily used to write Nepalbhasa (Newar) and Sanskrit. In the past, it has also been used for writing Nepali, Bengali, Maithili, and Hindustani in Nepal Mandala. Various publications are still published in this script, including the Sikkim Herald, the bulletin of the Sikkim government (Newari edition).

== Etymology ==
The Newar script is known as Nepālākṣara or Nepāla lipi, which means script of Nepal. This script is colloquially referred as Nevāḥ ākhaḥ in Modern-Newar language, and Nevārī lipi in Nepali language. The Newar script is also known as Pracalit lipi ("popular script"), as it was one of the most widely used script among all of the scripts used in Nepal, with majority of manuscripts and inscriptions written in it.

The multilingual stone inscription of Pratap Malla dated to 1654 CE, uses "Nevāra ākhara" (Newar script) to refer this script in Classical Newar. Similarly, in a 1747 CE work, Capuchin friar Costantino da Ascoli refers to this script as Nepalese.

== History ==
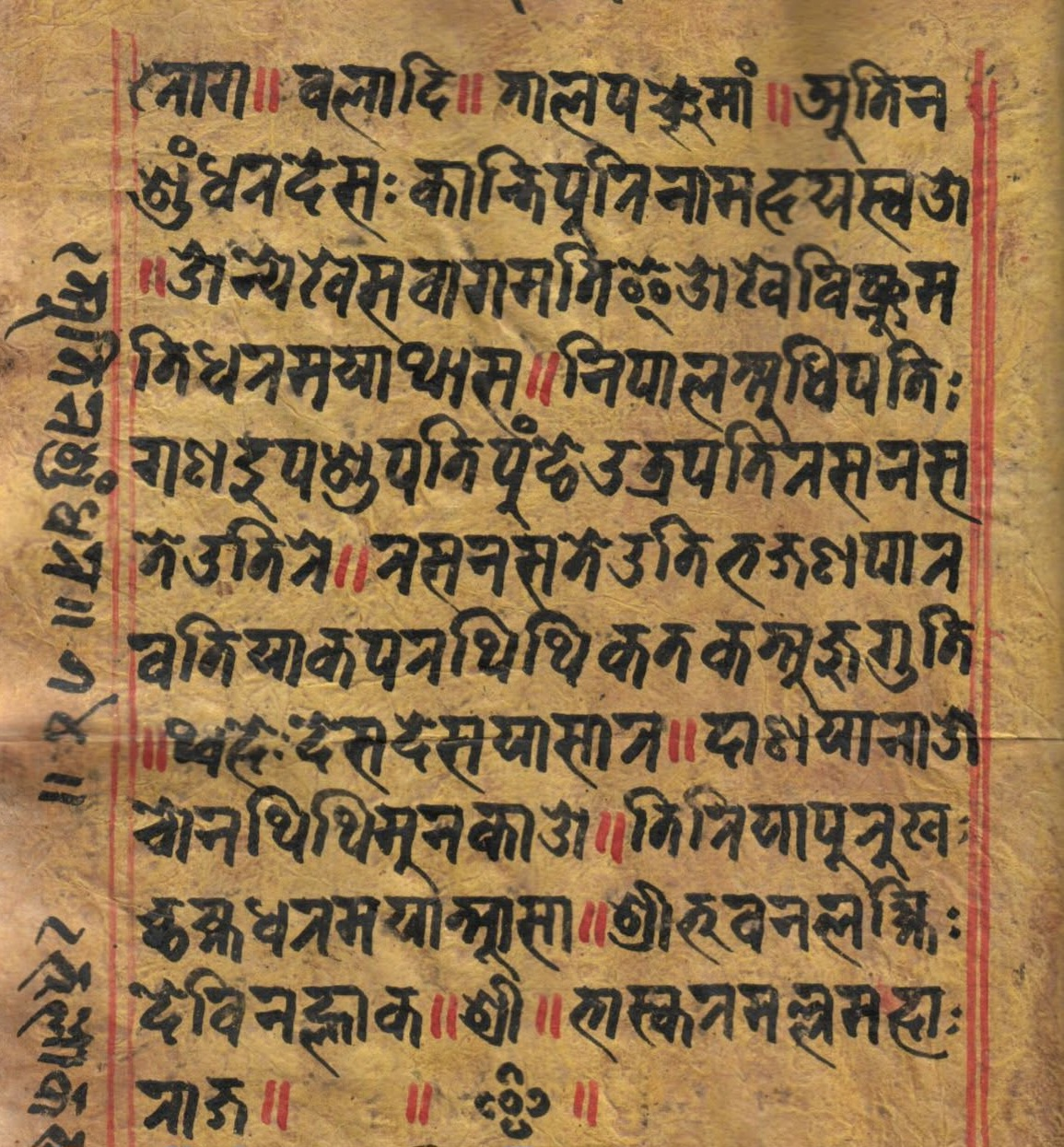
A folio of Newar poem Atina Sundar Desh Kantipuri, written by Bhuwan Lakshmi, the queen consort of King Bhupalendra Malla in Newar script.

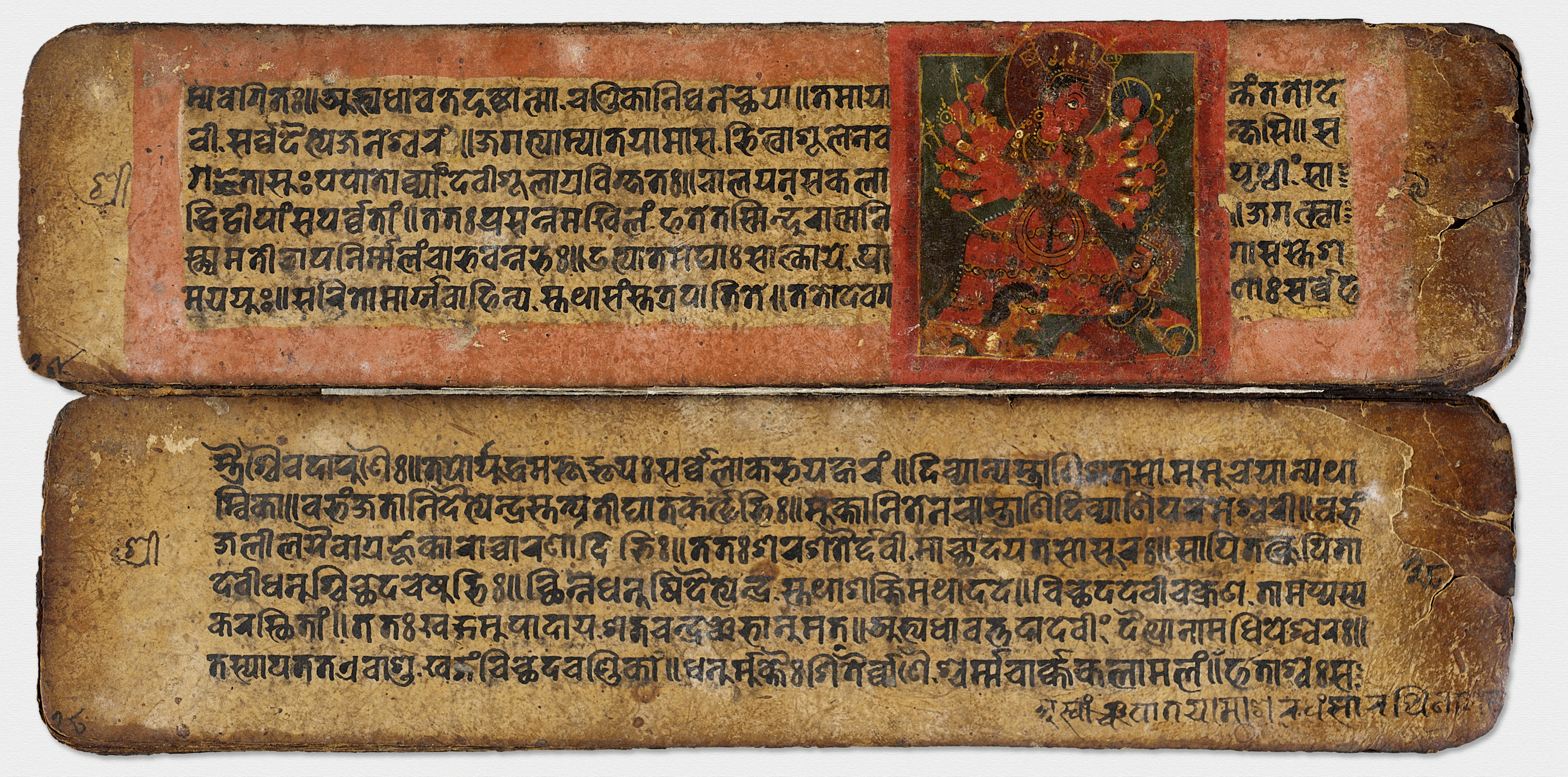
A 17th-century Devi Mahatmya manuscript written in Newar script.

The Newar script first appeared in a manuscript entitled Laṅkāvatāra Sutra dated 908 CE. The first inscription in the Newar script is the inscription of King Shankaradeva at Jaishideval, Kathmandu, dated to 920 CE. The first coin in this script appeared during the reign of King Shivadeva (1098–1126 CE). The oldest surviving manuscript of the Abhijnana Shakuntala, dated to the 12th century, was written in this script and is now situated at the Asiatic Society. Similarly, the oldest surviving manuscript of the Ramayana dated 1020, was written in the Newar script.

During the Malla dynasty, official records and inscriptions were written in Newar script. It was also used in official documents by the early Shah rulers, as shown by the Nepal-Tibet treaty of 1775, which was written in this script. In 1905, official documents written in Newar were declared illegal during the Rana regime. Since then, the script started to be replaced by Devanagari.

== Alphabet ==
=== Vowels ===
Vowels	Diacritics	IAST & IPA	With 𑐎 (ka)	With 𑐐 (ga)	Vowels	Diacritics	IAST & IPA	With 𑐎 (ka)	With 𑐐 (ga)
𑐀	—	a /ɐ/	𑐎	𑐐	𑐁	𑐵	ā /aː/	𑐎𑐵	𑐐𑐵
𑐂	𑐶	i /i/	𑐎𑐶	𑐐𑐶	𑐃	𑐷	ī /iː/	𑐎𑐷	𑐐𑐷
𑐄	𑐸	u /u/	𑐎𑐸	𑐐𑐸	𑐅	𑐹	ū /uː/	𑐎𑐹	𑐐𑐹
𑐆	𑐺	ṛ /r̩/	𑐎𑐺	𑐐𑐺	𑐇	𑐻	ṝ /r̩ː/	𑐎𑐻	𑐐𑐻
𑐈	𑐼	ḷ /l̩/	𑐎𑐼	𑐐𑐼	𑐉	𑐽	ḹ /l̩ː/	𑐎𑐽	𑐐𑐽
𑐊	𑐾	e /eː/	𑐎𑐾	𑐐𑐾	𑐋	𑐿	ai /ɐi̯/	𑐎𑐿	𑐐𑐿
𑐌	𑑀	o /oː/	𑐎𑑀	𑐐𑑀	𑐍	𑑁	au /ɐu̯/	𑐎𑑁	𑐐𑑁
𑐀𑑄	𑑄	aṃ /◌̃/	𑐎𑑄	𑐐𑑄	𑐀𑑅	𑑅	aḥ /h/	𑐎𑑅	𑐐𑑅

Some of the vowel diacritics have different appearances depending on whether the consonant has a top line or not. There are seven consonants without top lines: ga, ña, ṭha, ṇa, tha, dha and śa.

=== Consonant ===
	Plosive								Nasal				Approximant				Fricative	
	Voiceless				Voiced				Nasal				Approximant				Fricative	
	Plain		Aspirated		Modal		Breathy		Modal		Breathy		Modal		Breathy		Fricative	
Velar	𑐎	ka [k]	𑐏	kha [kʰ]	𑐐	ga [ɡ]	𑐑	gha [ɡʱ]	𑐒	ṅa [ŋ]	𑐓	ṅha [ŋʱ]						
Palatal	𑐔	ca [t͡ɕ]	𑐕	cha [t͡ɕʰ]	𑐖	ja [d͡ʑ]	𑐗	jha [d͡ʑʱ]	𑐘	ña [ɲ]	𑐙	ñha [ɲʱ]	𑐫	ya [j]	𑐴𑑂𑐫	yha [jʱ]	𑐱	śa [ʃ]
Retroflex	𑐚	ṭa [ʈ]	𑐛	ṭha [ʈʰ]	𑐜	ḍa [ɖ]	𑐝	ḍha [ɖʱ]	𑐞	ṇa [ɳ]	𑐴𑑂𑐞	ṇha [ɳʱ]	𑐬	ra [r]	𑐭	rha [ɾʱ]	𑐲	ṣa [ʂ]
Dental	𑐟	ta [t]	𑐠	tha [tʰ]	𑐡	da [d]	𑐢	dha [dʱ]	𑐣	na [n]	𑐤	nha [nʱ]	𑐮	la [l]	𑐯	lha [lʱ]	𑐳	sa [s]
Labial	𑐥	pa [p]	𑐦	pha [pʰ]	𑐧	ba [b]	𑐨	bha [bʱ]	𑐩	ma [m]	𑐪	mha [mʱ]	𑐰	va [w]	𑐴𑑂𑐰	vha [wʱ]		

Guttural	𑐴	ha [ɦ]

=== Consonants with vowel diacritics ===
The following table contains the consonants with vowel diacritics.

	a	ā	i	ī	u	ū	ṛ	ṝ	ḷ	ḹ	e	ai	o	au	am̐	aṃ	aḥ
	𑐀	𑐀𑐵	𑐂	𑐃	𑐄	𑐅	𑐆	𑐇	𑐈	𑐉	𑐊	𑐋	𑐌	𑐍	𑐀𑑃	𑐀𑑄	𑐀𑑅
k-	𑐎	𑐎𑐵	𑐎𑐶	𑐎𑐷	𑐎𑐸	𑐎𑐹	𑐎𑐺	𑐎𑐻	𑐎𑐼	𑐎𑐽	𑐎𑐾	𑐎𑐿	𑐎𑑀	𑐎𑑁	𑐎𑑃	𑐎𑑄	𑐎𑑅
kh-	𑐏	𑐏𑐵	𑐏𑐶	𑐏𑐷	𑐏𑐸	𑐏𑐹	𑐏𑐺	𑐏𑐻	𑐏𑐼	𑐏𑐽	𑐏𑐾	𑐏𑐿	𑐏𑑀	𑐏𑑁	𑐏𑑃	𑐏𑑄	𑐏𑑅
g-	𑐐	𑐐𑐵	𑐐𑐶	𑐐𑐷	𑐐𑐸	𑐐𑐹	𑐐𑐺	𑐐𑐻	𑐐𑐼	𑐐𑐽	𑐐𑐾	𑐐𑐿	𑐐𑑀	𑐐𑑁	𑐐𑑃	𑐐𑑄	𑐐𑑅
gh-	𑐑	𑐑𑐵	𑐑𑐶	𑐑𑐷	𑐑𑐸	𑐑𑐹	𑐑𑐺	𑐑𑐻	𑐑𑐼	𑐑𑐽	𑐑𑐾	𑐑𑐿	𑐑𑑀	𑐑𑑁	𑐑𑑃	𑐑𑑄	𑐑𑑅
ṅ-	𑐒	𑐒𑐵	𑐒𑐶	𑐒𑐷	𑐒𑐸	𑐒𑐹	𑐒𑐺	𑐒𑐻	𑐒𑐼	𑐒𑐽	𑐒𑐾	𑐒𑐿	𑐒𑑀	𑐒𑑁	𑐒𑑃	𑐒𑑄	𑐒𑑅
c-	𑐔	𑐔𑐵	𑐔𑐶	𑐔𑐷	𑐔𑐸	𑐔𑐹	𑐔𑐺	𑐔𑐻	𑐔𑐼	𑐔𑐽	𑐔𑐾	𑐔𑐿	𑐔𑑀	𑐔𑑁	𑐔𑑃	𑐔𑑄	𑐔𑑅
ch-	𑐕	𑐕𑐵	𑐕𑐶	𑐕𑐷	𑐕𑐸	𑐕𑐹	𑐕𑐺	𑐕𑐻	𑐕𑐼	𑐕𑐽	𑐕𑐾	𑐕𑐿	𑐕𑑀	𑐕𑑁	𑐕𑑃	𑐕𑑄	𑐕𑑅
j-	𑐖	𑐖𑐵	𑐖𑐶	𑐖𑐷	𑐖𑐸	𑐖𑐹	𑐖𑐺	𑐖𑐻	𑐖𑐼	𑐖𑐽	𑐖𑐾	𑐖𑐿	𑐖𑑀	𑐖𑑁	𑐖𑑃	𑐖𑑄	𑐖𑑅
jh-	𑐗	𑐗𑐵	𑐗𑐶	𑐗𑐷	𑐗𑐸	𑐗𑐹	𑐗𑐺	𑐗𑐻	𑐗𑐼	𑐗𑐽	𑐗𑐾	𑐗𑐿	𑐗𑑀	𑐗𑑁	𑐗𑑃	𑐗𑑄	𑐗𑑅
ñ-	𑐘	𑐘𑐵	𑐘𑐶	𑐘𑐷	𑐘𑐸	𑐘𑐹	𑐘𑐺	𑐘𑐻	𑐘𑐼	𑐘𑐽	𑐘𑐾	𑐘𑐿	𑐘𑑀	𑐘𑑁	𑐘𑑃	𑐘𑑄	𑐘𑑅
ṭ-	𑐚	𑐚𑐵	𑐚𑐶	𑐚𑐷	𑐚𑐸	𑐚𑐹	𑐚𑐺	𑐚𑐻	𑐚𑐼	𑐚𑐽	𑐚𑐾	𑐚𑐿	𑐚𑑀	𑐚𑑁	𑐚𑑃	𑐚𑑄	𑐚𑑅
ṭh-	𑐛	𑐛𑐵	𑐛𑐶	𑐛𑐷	𑐛𑐸	𑐛𑐹	𑐛𑐺	𑐛𑐻	𑐛𑐼	𑐛𑐽	𑐛𑐾	𑐛𑐿	𑐛𑑀	𑐛𑑁	𑐛𑑃	𑐛𑑄	𑐛𑑅
ḍ-	𑐜	𑐜𑐵	𑐜𑐶	𑐜𑐷	𑐜𑐸	𑐜𑐹	𑐜𑐺	𑐜𑐻	𑐜𑐼	𑐜𑐽	𑐜𑐾	𑐜𑐿	𑐜𑑀	𑐜𑑁	𑐜𑑃	𑐜𑑄	𑐜𑑅
ḍh-	𑐝	𑐝𑐵	𑐝𑐶	𑐝𑐷	𑐝𑐸	𑐝𑐹	𑐝𑐺	𑐝𑐻	𑐝𑐼	𑐝𑐽	𑐝𑐾	𑐝𑐿	𑐝𑑀	𑐝𑑁	𑐝𑑃	𑐝𑑄	𑐝𑑅
ṇ-	𑐞	𑐞𑐵	𑐞𑐶	𑐞𑐷	𑐞𑐸	𑐞𑐹	𑐞𑐺	𑐞𑐻	𑐞𑐼	𑐞𑐽	𑐞𑐾	𑐞𑐿	𑐞𑑀	𑐞𑑁	𑐞𑑃	𑐞𑑄	𑐞𑑅
t-	𑐟	𑐟𑐵	𑐟𑐶	𑐟𑐷	𑐟𑐸	𑐟𑐹	𑐟𑐺	𑐟𑐻	𑐟𑐼	𑐟𑐽	𑐟𑐾	𑐟𑐿	𑐟𑑀	𑐟𑑁	𑐟𑑃	𑐟𑑄	𑐟𑑅
th-	𑐠	𑐠𑐵	𑐠𑐶	𑐠𑐷	𑐠𑐸	𑐠𑐹	𑐠𑐺	𑐠𑐻	𑐠𑐼	𑐠𑐽	𑐠𑐾	𑐠𑐿	𑐠𑑀	𑐠𑑁	𑐠𑑃	𑐠𑑄	𑐠𑑅
d-	𑐡	𑐡𑐵	𑐡𑐶	𑐡𑐷	𑐡𑐸	𑐡𑐹	𑐡𑐺	𑐡𑐻	𑐡𑐼	𑐡𑐽	𑐡𑐾	𑐡𑐿	𑐡𑑀	𑐡𑑁	𑐡𑑃	𑐡𑑄	𑐡𑑅
dh-	𑐢	𑐢𑐵	𑐢𑐶	𑐢𑐷	𑐢𑐸	𑐢𑐹	𑐢𑐺	𑐢𑐻	𑐢𑐼	𑐢𑐽	𑐢𑐾	𑐢𑐿	𑐢𑑀	𑐢𑑁	𑐢𑑃	𑐢𑑄	𑐢𑑅
n-	𑐣	𑐣𑐵	𑐣𑐶	𑐣𑐷	𑐣𑐸	𑐣𑐹	𑐣𑐺	𑐣𑐻	𑐣𑐼	𑐣𑐽	𑐣𑐾	𑐣𑐿	𑐣𑑀	𑐣𑑁	𑐣𑑃	𑐣𑑄	𑐣𑑅
p-	𑐥	𑐥𑐵	𑐥𑐶	𑐥𑐷	𑐥𑐸	𑐥𑐹	𑐥𑐺	𑐥𑐻	𑐥𑐼	𑐥𑐽	𑐥𑐾	𑐥𑐿	𑐥𑑀	𑐥𑑁	𑐥𑑃	𑐥𑑄	𑐥𑑅
ph-	𑐦	𑐦𑐵	𑐦𑐶	𑐦𑐷	𑐦𑐸	𑐦𑐹	𑐦𑐺	𑐦𑐻	𑐦𑐼	𑐦𑐽	𑐦𑐾	𑐦𑐿	𑐦𑑀	𑐦𑑁	𑐦𑑃	𑐦𑑄	𑐦𑑅
b-	𑐧	𑐧𑐵	𑐧𑐶	𑐧𑐷	𑐧𑐸	𑐧𑐹	𑐧𑐺	𑐧𑐻	𑐧𑐼	𑐧𑐽	𑐧𑐾	𑐧𑐿	𑐧𑑀	𑐧𑑁	𑐧𑑃	𑐧𑑄	𑐧𑑅
bh-	𑐨	𑐨𑐵	𑐨𑐶	𑐨𑐷	𑐨𑐸	𑐨𑐹	𑐨𑐺	𑐨𑐻	𑐨𑐼	𑐨𑐽	𑐨𑐾	𑐨𑐿	𑐨𑑀	𑐨𑑁	𑐨𑑃	𑐨𑑄	𑐨𑑅
m-	𑐩	𑐩𑐵	𑐩𑐶	𑐩𑐷	𑐩𑐸	𑐩𑐹	𑐩𑐺	𑐩𑐻	𑐩𑐼	𑐩𑐽	𑐩𑐾	𑐩𑐿	𑐩𑑀	𑐩𑑁	𑐩𑑃	𑐩𑑄	𑐩𑑅
y-	𑐫	𑐫𑐵	𑐫𑐶	𑐫𑐷	𑐫𑐸	𑐫𑐹	𑐫𑐺	𑐫𑐻	𑐫𑐼	𑐫𑐽	𑐫𑐾	𑐫𑐿	𑐫𑑀	𑐫𑑁	𑐫𑑃	𑐫𑑄	𑐫𑑅
r-	𑐬	𑐬𑐵	𑐬𑐶	𑐬𑐷	𑐬𑐸	𑐬𑐹	𑐬𑐺	𑐬𑐻	𑐬𑐼	𑐬𑐽	𑐬𑐾	𑐬𑐿	𑐬𑑀	𑐬𑑁	𑐬𑑃	𑐬𑑄	𑐬𑑅
l-	𑐮	𑐮𑐵	𑐮𑐶	𑐮𑐷	𑐮𑐸	𑐮𑐹	𑐮𑐺	𑐮𑐻	𑐮𑐼	𑐮𑐽	𑐮𑐾	𑐮𑐿	𑐮𑑀	𑐮𑑁	𑐮𑑃	𑐮𑑄	𑐮𑑅
v-	𑐰	𑐰𑐵	𑐰𑐶	𑐰𑐷	𑐰𑐸	𑐰𑐹	𑐰𑐺	𑐰𑐻	𑐰𑐼	𑐰𑐽	𑐰𑐾	𑐰𑐿	𑐰𑑀	𑐰𑑁	𑐰𑑃	𑐰𑑄	𑐰𑑅
ś-	𑐱	𑐱𑐵	𑐱𑐶	𑐱𑐷	𑐱𑐸	𑐱𑐹	𑐱𑐺	𑐱𑐻	𑐱𑐼	𑐱𑐽	𑐱𑐾	𑐱𑐿	𑐱𑑀	𑐱𑑁	𑐱𑑃	𑐱𑑄	𑐱𑑅
ṣ-	𑐲	𑐲𑐵	𑐲𑐶	𑐲𑐷	𑐲𑐸	𑐲𑐹	𑐲𑐺	𑐲𑐻	𑐲𑐼	𑐲𑐽	𑐲𑐾	𑐲𑐿	𑐲𑑀	𑐲𑑁	𑐲𑑃	𑐲𑑄	𑐲𑑅
s-	𑐳	𑐳𑐵	𑐳𑐶	𑐳𑐷	𑐳𑐸	𑐳𑐹	𑐳𑐺	𑐳𑐻	𑐳𑐼	𑐳𑐽	𑐳𑐾	𑐳𑐿	𑐳𑑀	𑐳𑑁	𑐳𑑃	𑐳𑑄	𑐳𑑅
h-	𑐴	𑐴𑐵	𑐴𑐶	𑐴𑐷	𑐴𑐸	𑐴𑐹	𑐴𑐺	𑐴𑐻	𑐴𑐼	𑐴𑐽	𑐴𑐾	𑐴𑐿	𑐴𑑀	𑐴𑑁	𑐴𑑃	𑐴𑑄	𑐴𑑅
kṣ-	𑐎𑑂𑐲	𑐎𑑂𑐲𑐵	𑐎𑑂𑐲𑐶	𑐎𑑂𑐲𑐷	𑐎𑑂𑐲𑐸	𑐎𑑂𑐲𑐹	𑐎𑑂𑐲𑐺	𑐎𑑂𑐲𑐻	𑐎𑑂𑐲𑐼	𑐎𑑂𑐲𑐽	𑐎𑑂𑐲𑐾	𑐎𑑂𑐲𑐿	𑐎𑑂𑐲𑑀	𑐎𑑂𑐲𑑁	𑐎𑑂𑐲𑑃	𑐎𑑂𑐲𑑄	𑐎𑑂𑐲𑑅
tr-	𑐟𑑂𑐬	𑐟𑑂𑐬𑐵	𑐟𑑂𑐬𑐶	𑐟𑑂𑐬𑐷	𑐟𑑂𑐬𑐸	𑐟𑑂𑐬𑐹	𑐟𑑂𑐬𑐺	𑐟𑑂𑐬𑐻	𑐟𑑂𑐬𑐼	𑐟𑑂𑐬𑐽	𑐟𑑂𑐬𑐾	𑐟𑑂𑐬𑐿	𑐟𑑂𑐬𑑀	𑐟𑑂𑐬𑑁	𑐟𑑂𑐬𑑃	𑐟𑑂𑐬𑑄	𑐟𑑂𑐬𑑅
jñ-	𑐖𑑂𑐘	𑐖𑑂𑐘𑐵	𑐖𑑂𑐘𑐶	𑐖𑑂𑐘𑐷	𑐖𑑂𑐘𑐸	𑐖𑑂𑐘𑐹	𑐖𑑂𑐘𑐺	𑐖𑑂𑐘𑐻	𑐖𑑂𑐘𑐼	𑐖𑑂𑐘𑐽	𑐖𑑂𑐘𑐾	𑐖𑑂𑐘𑐿	𑐖𑑂𑐘𑑀	𑐖𑑂𑐘𑑁	𑐖𑑂𑐘𑑃	𑐖𑑂𑐘𑑄	𑐖𑑂𑐘𑑅

Some letters in Newar have alternative forms that are used when combined with certain vowel diacritics or included in a consonant cluster.

- Letter bha and ha changes appearance when combined with any of the vowel diacritics u, ū, ṛ, ṝ, ḷ and ḹ.
- Letter ja and ra forms ligatures together with the vowels u and ū.
- Vowels u changes appearance when combined with the letters ga, ta, bha and śa.

=== Consonant conjuncts ===
Consonant clusters are written by writing several consonant letters together in complex ligatures. How they are written depends on the shape of the letters and some letters have alternative shapes that are used depending on their position in the cluster. The following table shows the consonant conjunction in the Newar script.

Newar consonant conjuncts
	𑐎	𑐏	𑐐	𑐑	𑐒	𑐔	𑐕	𑐖	𑐗	𑐘	𑐚	𑐛	𑐜	𑐝	𑐞	𑐟	𑐠	𑐡	𑐢	𑐣	𑐥	𑐦	𑐧	𑐨	𑐩	𑐫	𑐬	𑐮	𑐰	𑐱	𑐲	𑐳	𑐴
𑐎	𑐎𑑂𑐎	𑐎𑑂𑐏	𑐎𑑂𑐐	𑐎𑑂𑐑	𑐎𑑂𑐒	𑐎𑑂𑐔	𑐎𑑂𑐕	𑐎𑑂𑐖	𑐎𑑂𑐗	𑐎𑑂𑐘	𑐎𑑂𑐚	𑐎𑑂𑐛	𑐎𑑂𑐜	𑐎𑑂𑐝	𑐎𑑂𑐞	𑐎𑑂𑐟	𑐎𑑂𑐠	𑐎𑑂𑐡	𑐎𑑂𑐢	𑐎𑑂𑐣	𑐎𑑂𑐥	𑐎𑑂𑐦	𑐎𑑂𑐧	𑐎𑑂𑐨	𑐎𑑂𑐩	𑐎𑑂𑐫	𑐎𑑂𑐬	𑐎𑑂𑐮	𑐎𑑂𑐰	𑐎𑑂𑐱	𑐎𑑂𑐲	𑐎𑑂𑐳	𑐎𑑂𑐴
𑐏	𑐏𑑂𑐎	𑐏𑑂𑐏	𑐏𑑂𑐐	𑐏𑑂𑐑	𑐏𑑂𑐒	𑐏𑑂𑐔	𑐏𑑂𑐕	𑐏𑑂𑐖	𑐏𑑂𑐗	𑐏𑑂𑐘	𑐏𑑂𑐚	𑐏𑑂𑐛	𑐏𑑂𑐜	𑐏𑑂𑐝	𑐏𑑂𑐞	𑐏𑑂𑐟	𑐏𑑂𑐠	𑐏𑑂𑐡	𑐏𑑂𑐢	𑐏𑑂𑐣	𑐏𑑂𑐥	𑐏𑑂𑐦	𑐏𑑂𑐧	𑐏𑑂𑐨	𑐏𑑂𑐩	𑐏𑑂𑐫	𑐏𑑂𑐬	𑐏𑑂𑐮	𑐏𑑂𑐰	𑐏𑑂𑐱	𑐏𑑂𑐲	𑐏𑑂𑐳	𑐏𑑂𑐴
𑐐	𑐐𑑂𑐎	𑐐𑑂𑐏	𑐐𑑂𑐐	𑐐𑑂𑐑	𑐐𑑂𑐒	𑐐𑑂𑐔	𑐐𑑂𑐕	𑐐𑑂𑐖	𑐐𑑂𑐗	𑐐𑑂𑐘	𑐐𑑂𑐚	𑐐𑑂𑐛	𑐐𑑂𑐜	𑐐𑑂𑐝	𑐐𑑂𑐞	𑐐𑑂𑐟	𑐐𑑂𑐠	𑐐𑑂𑐡	𑐐𑑂𑐢	𑐐𑑂𑐣	𑐐𑑂𑐥	𑐐𑑂𑐦	𑐐𑑂𑐧	𑐐𑑂𑐨	𑐐𑑂𑐩	𑐐𑑂𑐫	𑐐𑑂𑐬	𑐐𑑂𑐮	𑐐𑑂𑐰	𑐐𑑂𑐱	𑐐𑑂𑐲	𑐐𑑂𑐳	𑐐𑑂𑐴
𑐑	𑐑𑑂𑐎	𑐑𑑂𑐏	𑐑𑑂𑐐	𑐑𑑂𑐑	𑐑𑑂𑐒	𑐑𑑂𑐔	𑐑𑑂𑐕	𑐑𑑂𑐖	𑐑𑑂𑐗	𑐑𑑂𑐘	𑐑𑑂𑐚	𑐑𑑂𑐛	𑐑𑑂𑐜	𑐑𑑂𑐝	𑐑𑑂𑐞	𑐑𑑂𑐟	𑐑𑑂𑐠	𑐑𑑂𑐡	𑐑𑑂𑐢	𑐑𑑂𑐣	𑐑𑑂𑐥	𑐑𑑂𑐦	𑐑𑑂𑐧	𑐑𑑂𑐨	𑐑𑑂𑐩	𑐑𑑂𑐫	𑐑𑑂𑐬	𑐑𑑂𑐮	𑐑𑑂𑐰	𑐑𑑂𑐱	𑐑𑑂𑐲	𑐑𑑂𑐳	𑐑𑑂𑐴
𑐒	𑐒𑑂𑐎	𑐒𑑂𑐏	𑐒𑑂𑐐	𑐒𑑂𑐑	𑐒𑑂𑐒	𑐒𑑂𑐔	𑐒𑑂𑐕	𑐒𑑂𑐖	𑐒𑑂𑐗	𑐒𑑂𑐘	𑐒𑑂𑐚	𑐒𑑂𑐛	𑐒𑑂𑐜	𑐒𑑂𑐝	𑐒𑑂𑐞	𑐒𑑂𑐟	𑐒𑑂𑐠	𑐒𑑂𑐡	𑐒𑑂𑐢	𑐒𑑂𑐣	𑐒𑑂𑐥	𑐒𑑂𑐦	𑐒𑑂𑐧	𑐒𑑂𑐨	𑐒𑑂𑐩	𑐒𑑂𑐫	𑐒𑑂𑐬	𑐒𑑂𑐮	𑐒𑑂𑐰	𑐒𑑂𑐱	𑐒𑑂𑐲	𑐒𑑂𑐳	𑐒𑑂𑐴
𑐔	𑐔𑑂𑐎	𑐔𑑂𑐏	𑐔𑑂𑐐	𑐔𑑂𑐑	𑐔𑑂𑐒	𑐔𑑂𑐔	𑐔𑑂𑐕	𑐔𑑂𑐖	𑐔𑑂𑐗	𑐔𑑂𑐘	𑐔𑑂𑐚	𑐔𑑂𑐛	𑐔𑑂𑐜	𑐔𑑂𑐝	𑐔𑑂𑐞	𑐔𑑂𑐟	𑐔𑑂𑐠	𑐔𑑂𑐡	𑐔𑑂𑐢	𑐔𑑂𑐣	𑐔𑑂𑐥	𑐔𑑂𑐦	𑐔𑑂𑐧	𑐔𑑂𑐨	𑐔𑑂𑐩	𑐔𑑂𑐫	𑐔𑑂𑐬	𑐔𑑂𑐮	𑐔𑑂𑐰	𑐔𑑂𑐱	𑐔𑑂𑐲	𑐔𑑂𑐳	𑐔𑑂𑐴
𑐕	𑐕𑑂𑐎	𑐕𑑂𑐏	𑐕𑑂𑐐	𑐕𑑂𑐑	𑐕𑑂𑐒	𑐕𑑂𑐔	𑐕𑑂𑐕	𑐕𑑂𑐖	𑐕𑑂𑐗	𑐕𑑂𑐘	𑐕𑑂𑐚	𑐕𑑂𑐛	𑐕𑑂𑐜	𑐕𑑂𑐝	𑐕𑑂𑐞	𑐕𑑂𑐟	𑐕𑑂𑐠	𑐕𑑂𑐡	𑐕𑑂𑐢	𑐕𑑂𑐣	𑐕𑑂𑐥	𑐕𑑂𑐦	𑐕𑑂𑐧	𑐕𑑂𑐨	𑐕𑑂𑐩	𑐕𑑂𑐫	𑐕𑑂𑐬	𑐕𑑂𑐮	𑐕𑑂𑐰	𑐕𑑂𑐱	𑐕𑑂𑐲	𑐕𑑂𑐳	𑐕𑑂𑐴
𑐖	𑐖𑑂𑐎	𑐖𑑂𑐏	𑐖𑑂𑐐	𑐖𑑂𑐑	𑐖𑑂𑐒	𑐖𑑂𑐔	𑐖𑑂𑐕	𑐖𑑂𑐖	𑐖𑑂𑐗	𑐖𑑂𑐘	𑐖𑑂𑐚	𑐖𑑂𑐛	𑐖𑑂𑐜	𑐖𑑂𑐝	𑐖𑑂𑐞	𑐖𑑂𑐟	𑐖𑑂𑐠	𑐖𑑂𑐡	𑐖𑑂𑐢	𑐖𑑂𑐣	𑐖𑑂𑐥	𑐖𑑂𑐦	𑐖𑑂𑐧	𑐖𑑂𑐨	𑐖𑑂𑐩	𑐖𑑂𑐫	𑐖𑑂𑐬	𑐖𑑂𑐮	𑐖𑑂𑐰	𑐖𑑂𑐱	𑐖𑑂𑐲	𑐖𑑂𑐳	𑐖𑑂𑐴
𑐗	𑐗𑑂𑐎	𑐗𑑂𑐏	𑐗𑑂𑐐	𑐗𑑂𑐑	𑐗𑑂𑐒	𑐗𑑂𑐔	𑐗𑑂𑐕	𑐗𑑂𑐖	𑐗𑑂𑐗	𑐗𑑂𑐘	𑐗𑑂𑐚	𑐗𑑂𑐛	𑐗𑑂𑐜	𑐗𑑂𑐝	𑐗𑑂𑐞	𑐗𑑂𑐟	𑐗𑑂𑐠	𑐗𑑂𑐡	𑐗𑑂𑐢	𑐗𑑂𑐣	𑐗𑑂𑐥	𑐗𑑂𑐦	𑐗𑑂𑐧	𑐗𑑂𑐨	𑐗𑑂𑐩	𑐗𑑂𑐫	𑐗𑑂𑐬	𑐗𑑂𑐮	𑐗𑑂𑐰	𑐗𑑂𑐱	𑐗𑑂𑐲	𑐗𑑂𑐳	𑐗𑑂𑐴
𑐘	𑐘𑑂𑐎	𑐘𑑂𑐏	𑐘𑑂𑐐	𑐘𑑂𑐑	𑐘𑑂𑐒	𑐘𑑂𑐔	𑐘𑑂𑐕	𑐘𑑂𑐖	𑐘𑑂𑐗	𑐘𑑂𑐘	𑐘𑑂𑐚	𑐘𑑂𑐛	𑐘𑑂𑐜	𑐘𑑂𑐝	𑐘𑑂𑐞	𑐘𑑂𑐟	𑐘𑑂𑐠	𑐘𑑂𑐡	𑐘𑑂𑐢	𑐘𑑂𑐣	𑐘𑑂𑐥	𑐘𑑂𑐦	𑐘𑑂𑐧	𑐘𑑂𑐨	𑐘𑑂𑐩	𑐘𑑂𑐫	𑐘𑑂𑐬	𑐘𑑂𑐮	𑐘𑑂𑐰	𑐘𑑂𑐱	𑐘𑑂𑐲	𑐘𑑂𑐳	𑐘𑑂𑐴
𑐚	𑐚𑑂𑐎	𑐚𑑂𑐏	𑐚𑑂𑐐	𑐚𑑂𑐑	𑐚𑑂𑐒	𑐚𑑂𑐔	𑐚𑑂𑐕	𑐚𑑂𑐖	𑐚𑑂𑐗	𑐚𑑂𑐘	𑐚𑑂𑐚	𑐚𑑂𑐛	𑐚𑑂𑐜	𑐚𑑂𑐝	𑐚𑑂𑐞	𑐚𑑂𑐟	𑐚𑑂𑐠	𑐚𑑂𑐡	𑐚𑑂𑐢	𑐚𑑂𑐣	𑐚𑑂𑐥	𑐚𑑂𑐦	𑐚𑑂𑐧	𑐚𑑂𑐨	𑐚𑑂𑐩	𑐚𑑂𑐫	𑐚𑑂𑐬	𑐚𑑂𑐮	𑐚𑑂𑐰	𑐚𑑂𑐱	𑐚𑑂𑐲	𑐚𑑂𑐳	𑐴𑑂𑐚
𑐛	𑐛𑑂𑐎	𑐛𑑂𑐏	𑐛𑑂𑐐	𑐛𑑂𑐑	𑐛𑑂𑐒	𑐛𑑂𑐔	𑐛𑑂𑐕	𑐛𑑂𑐖	𑐛𑑂𑐗	𑐛𑑂𑐘	𑐛𑑂𑐚	𑐛𑑂𑐛	𑐛𑑂𑐜	𑐛𑑂𑐝	𑐛𑑂𑐞	𑐛𑑂𑐟	𑐛𑑂𑐠	𑐛𑑂𑐡	𑐛𑑂𑐢	𑐛𑑂𑐣	𑐛𑑂𑐥	𑐛𑑂𑐦	𑐛𑑂𑐧	𑐛𑑂𑐨	𑐛𑑂𑐩	𑐛𑑂𑐫	𑐛𑑂𑐬	𑐛𑑂𑐮	𑐛𑑂𑐰	𑐛𑑂𑐱	𑐛𑑂𑐲	𑐛𑑂𑐳	𑐛𑑂𑐴
𑐜	𑐜𑑂𑐎	𑐜𑑂𑐏	𑐜𑑂𑐐	𑐜𑑂𑐑	𑐜𑑂𑐒	𑐜𑑂𑐔	𑐜𑑂𑐕	𑐜𑑂𑐖	𑐜𑑂𑐗	𑐜𑑂𑐘	𑐜𑑂𑐚	𑐜𑑂𑐛	𑐜𑑂𑐜	𑐜𑑂𑐝	𑐜𑑂𑐞	𑐜𑑂𑐟	𑐜𑑂𑐠	𑐜𑑂𑐡	𑐜𑑂𑐢	𑐜𑑂𑐣	𑐜𑑂𑐥	𑐜𑑂𑐦	𑐜𑑂𑐧	𑐜𑑂𑐨	𑐜𑑂𑐩	𑐜𑑂𑐫	𑐜𑑂𑐬	𑐜𑑂𑐮	𑐜𑑂𑐰	𑐜𑑂𑐱	𑐜𑑂𑐲	𑐜𑑂𑐳	𑐜𑑂𑐴
𑐝	𑐝𑑂𑐎	𑐝𑑂𑐏	𑐝𑑂𑐐	𑐝𑑂𑐑	𑐝𑑂𑐒	𑐝𑑂𑐔	𑐝𑑂𑐕	𑐝𑑂𑐖	𑐝𑑂𑐗	𑐝𑑂𑐘	𑐝𑑂𑐚	𑐝𑑂𑐛	𑐝𑑂𑐜	𑐝𑑂𑐝	𑐝𑑂𑐞	𑐝𑑂𑐟	𑐝𑑂𑐠	𑐝𑑂𑐡	𑐝𑑂𑐢	𑐝𑑂𑐣	𑐝𑑂𑐥	𑐝𑑂𑐦	𑐝𑑂𑐧	𑐝𑑂𑐨	𑐝𑑂𑐩	𑐝𑑂𑐫	𑐝𑑂𑐬	𑐝𑑂𑐮	𑐝𑑂𑐰	𑐝𑑂𑐱	𑐝𑑂𑐲	𑐝𑑂𑐳	𑐝𑑂𑐴
𑐞	𑐞𑑂𑐎	𑐞𑑂𑐏	𑐞𑑂𑐐	𑐞𑑂𑐑	𑐞𑑂𑐒	𑐞𑑂𑐔	𑐞𑑂𑐕	𑐞𑑂𑐖	𑐞𑑂𑐗	𑐞𑑂𑐘	𑐞𑑂𑐚	𑐞𑑂𑐛	𑐞𑑂𑐜	𑐞𑑂𑐝	𑐞𑑂𑐞	𑐞𑑂𑐟	𑐞𑑂𑐠	𑐞𑑂𑐡	𑐞𑑂𑐢	𑐞𑑂𑐣	𑐞𑑂𑐥	𑐞𑑂𑐦	𑐞𑑂𑐧	𑐞𑑂𑐨	𑐞𑑂𑐩	𑐞𑑂𑐫	𑐞𑑂𑐬	𑐞𑑂𑐮	𑐞𑑂𑐰	𑐞𑑂𑐱	𑐞𑑂𑐲	𑐞𑑂𑐳	𑐞𑑂𑐴
𑐟	𑐟𑑂𑐎	𑐟𑑂𑐏	𑐟𑑂𑐐	𑐟𑑂𑐑	𑐟𑑂𑐒	𑐟𑑂𑐔	𑐟𑑂𑐕	𑐟𑑂𑐖	𑐟𑑂𑐗	𑐟𑑂𑐘	𑐟𑑂𑐚	𑐟𑑂𑐛	𑐟𑑂𑐜	𑐟𑑂𑐝	𑐟𑑂𑐞	𑐟𑑂𑐟	𑐟𑑂𑐠	𑐟𑑂𑐡	𑐟𑑂𑐢	𑐟𑑂𑐣	𑐟𑑂𑐥	𑐟𑑂𑐦	𑐟𑑂𑐧	𑐟𑑂𑐨	𑐟𑑂𑐩	𑐟𑑂𑐫	𑐟𑑂𑐬	𑐟𑑂𑐮	𑐟𑑂𑐰	𑐟𑑂𑐱	𑐟𑑂𑐲	𑐟𑑂𑐳	𑐟𑑂𑐴
𑐠	𑐠𑑂𑐎	𑐠𑑂𑐏	𑐠𑑂𑐐	𑐠𑑂𑐑	𑐠𑑂𑐒	𑐠𑑂𑐔	𑐠𑑂𑐕	𑐠𑑂𑐖	𑐠𑑂𑐗	𑐠𑑂𑐘	𑐠𑑂𑐚	𑐠𑑂𑐛	𑐠𑑂𑐜	𑐠𑑂𑐝	𑐠𑑂𑐞	𑐠𑑂𑐟	𑐠𑑂𑐠	𑐠𑑂𑐡	𑐠𑑂𑐢	𑐠𑑂𑐣	𑐠𑑂𑐥	𑐠𑑂𑐦	𑐠𑑂𑐧	𑐠𑑂𑐨	𑐠𑑂𑐩	𑐠𑑂𑐫	𑐠𑑂𑐬	𑐠𑑂𑐮	𑐠𑑂𑐰	𑐠𑑂𑐱	𑐠𑑂𑐲	𑐠𑑂𑐳	𑐠𑑂𑐴
𑐡	𑐡𑑂𑐎	𑐡𑑂𑐏	𑐡𑑂𑐐	𑐡𑑂𑐑	𑐡𑑂𑐒	𑐡𑑂𑐔	𑐡𑑂𑐕	𑐡𑑂𑐖	𑐡𑑂𑐗	𑐡𑑂𑐘	𑐡𑑂𑐚	𑐡𑑂𑐛	𑐡𑑂𑐜	𑐡𑑂𑐝	𑐡𑑂𑐞	𑐡𑑂𑐟	𑐡𑑂𑐠	𑐡𑑂𑐡	𑐡𑑂𑐢	𑐡𑑂𑐣	𑐡𑑂𑐥	𑐡𑑂𑐦	𑐡𑑂𑐧	𑐡𑑂𑐨	𑐡𑑂𑐩	𑐡𑑂𑐫	𑐡𑑂𑐬	𑐡𑑂𑐮	𑐡𑑂𑐰	𑐡𑑂𑐱	𑐡𑑂𑐲	𑐡𑑂𑐳	𑐡𑑂𑐴
𑐢	𑐢𑑂𑐎	𑐢𑑂𑐏	𑐢𑑂𑐐	𑐢𑑂𑐑	𑐢𑑂𑐒	𑐢𑑂𑐔	𑐢𑑂𑐕	𑐢𑑂𑐖	𑐢𑑂𑐗	𑐢𑑂𑐘	𑐢𑑂𑐚	𑐢𑑂𑐛	𑐢𑑂𑐜	𑐢𑑂𑐝	𑐢𑑂𑐞	𑐢𑑂𑐟	𑐢𑑂𑐠	𑐢𑑂𑐡	𑐢𑑂𑐢	𑐢𑑂𑐣	𑐢𑑂𑐥	𑐢𑑂𑐦	𑐢𑑂𑐧	𑐢𑑂𑐨	𑐢𑑂𑐩	𑐢𑑂𑐫	𑐢𑑂𑐬	𑐢𑑂𑐮	𑐢𑑂𑐰	𑐢𑑂𑐱	𑐢𑑂𑐲	𑐢𑑂𑐳	𑐢𑑂𑐴
𑐣	𑐣𑑂𑐎	𑐣𑑂𑐏	𑐣𑑂𑐐	𑐣𑑂𑐑	𑐣𑑂𑐒	𑐣𑑂𑐔	𑐣𑑂𑐕	𑐣𑑂𑐖	𑐣𑑂𑐗	𑐣𑑂𑐘	𑐣𑑂𑐚	𑐣𑑂𑐛	𑐣𑑂𑐜	𑐣𑑂𑐝	𑐣𑑂𑐞	𑐣𑑂𑐟	𑐣𑑂𑐠	𑐣𑑂𑐡	𑐣𑑂𑐢	𑐣𑑂𑐣	𑐣𑑂𑐥	𑐣𑑂𑐦	𑐣𑑂𑐧	𑐣𑑂𑐨	𑐣𑑂𑐩	𑐣𑑂𑐫	𑐣𑑂𑐬	𑐣𑑂𑐮	𑐣𑑂𑐰	𑐣𑑂𑐱	𑐣𑑂𑐲	𑐣𑑂𑐳	𑐣𑑂𑐴
𑐥	𑐥𑑂𑐎	𑐥𑑂𑐏	𑐥𑑂𑐐	𑐥𑑂𑐑	𑐥𑑂𑐒	𑐥𑑂𑐔	𑐥𑑂𑐕	𑐥𑑂𑐖	𑐥𑑂𑐗	𑐥𑑂𑐘	𑐥𑑂𑐚	𑐥𑑂𑐛	𑐥𑑂𑐜	𑐥𑑂𑐝	𑐥𑑂𑐞	𑐥𑑂𑐟	𑐥𑑂𑐠	𑐥𑑂𑐡	𑐥𑑂𑐢	𑐥𑑂𑐣	𑐥𑑂𑐥	𑐥𑑂𑐦	𑐥𑑂𑐧	𑐥𑑂𑐨	𑐥𑑂𑐩	𑐥𑑂𑐫	𑐥𑑂𑐬	𑐥𑑂𑐮	𑐥𑑂𑐰	𑐥𑑂𑐱	𑐥𑑂𑐲	𑐥𑑂𑐳	𑐥𑑂𑐴
𑐦	𑐦𑑂𑐎	𑐦𑑂𑐏	𑐦𑑂𑐐	𑐦𑑂𑐑	𑐦𑑂𑐒	𑐦𑑂𑐔	𑐦𑑂𑐕	𑐦𑑂𑐖	𑐦𑑂𑐗	𑐦𑑂𑐘	𑐦𑑂𑐚	𑐦𑑂𑐛	𑐦𑑂𑐜	𑐦𑑂𑐝	𑐦𑑂𑐞	𑐦𑑂𑐟	𑐦𑑂𑐠	𑐦𑑂𑐡	𑐦𑑂𑐢	𑐦𑑂𑐣	𑐦𑑂𑐥	𑐦𑑂𑐦	𑐦𑑂𑐧	𑐦𑑂𑐨	𑐦𑑂𑐩	𑐦𑑂𑐫	𑐦𑑂𑐬	𑐦𑑂𑐮	𑐦𑑂𑐰	𑐦𑑂𑐱	𑐦𑑂𑐲	𑐦𑑂𑐳	𑐦𑑂𑐴
𑐧	𑐧𑑂𑐎	𑐧𑑂𑐏	𑐧𑑂𑐐	𑐧𑑂𑐑	𑐧𑑂𑐒	𑐧𑑂𑐔	𑐧𑑂𑐕	𑐧𑑂𑐖	𑐧𑑂𑐗	𑐧𑑂𑐘	𑐧𑑂𑐚	𑐧𑑂𑐛	𑐧𑑂𑐜	𑐧𑑂𑐝	𑐧𑑂𑐞	𑐧𑑂𑐟	𑐧𑑂𑐠	𑐧𑑂𑐡	𑐧𑑂𑐢	𑐧𑑂𑐣	𑐧𑑂𑐥	𑐧𑑂𑐦	𑐧𑑂𑐧	𑐧𑑂𑐨	𑐧𑑂𑐩	𑐧𑑂𑐫	𑐧𑑂𑐬	𑐧𑑂𑐮	𑐧𑑂𑐰	𑐧𑑂𑐱	𑐧𑑂𑐲	𑐧𑑂𑐳	𑐧𑑂𑐴
𑐨	𑐨𑑂𑐎	𑐨𑑂𑐏	𑐨𑑂𑐐	𑐨𑑂𑐑	𑐨𑑂𑐒	𑐨𑑂𑐔	𑐨𑑂𑐕	𑐨𑑂𑐖	𑐨𑑂𑐗	𑐨𑑂𑐘	𑐨𑑂𑐚	𑐨𑑂𑐛	𑐨𑑂𑐜	𑐨𑑂𑐝	𑐨𑑂𑐞	𑐨𑑂𑐟	𑐨𑑂𑐠	𑐨𑑂𑐡	𑐨𑑂𑐢	𑐨𑑂𑐣	𑐨𑑂𑐥	𑐨𑑂𑐦	𑐨𑑂𑐧	𑐨𑑂𑐨	𑐨𑑂𑐩	𑐨𑑂𑐫	𑐨𑑂𑐬	𑐨𑑂𑐮	𑐨𑑂𑐰	𑐨𑑂𑐱	𑐨𑑂𑐲	𑐨𑑂𑐳	𑐨𑑂𑐴
𑐩	𑐩𑑂𑐎	𑐩𑑂𑐏	𑐩𑑂𑐐	𑐩𑑂𑐑	𑐩𑑂𑐒	𑐩𑑂𑐔	𑐩𑑂𑐕	𑐩𑑂𑐖	𑐩𑑂𑐗	𑐩𑑂𑐘	𑐩𑑂𑐚	𑐩𑑂𑐛	𑐩𑑂𑐜	𑐩𑑂𑐝	𑐩𑑂𑐞	𑐩𑑂𑐟	𑐩𑑂𑐠	𑐩𑑂𑐡	𑐩𑑂𑐢	𑐩𑑂𑐣	𑐩𑑂𑐥	𑐩𑑂𑐦	𑐩𑑂𑐧	𑐩𑑂𑐨	𑐩𑑂𑐩	𑐩𑑂𑐫	𑐩𑑂𑐬	𑐩𑑂𑐮	𑐩𑑂𑐰	𑐩𑑂𑐱	𑐩𑑂𑐲	𑐩𑑂𑐳	𑐩𑑂𑐴
𑐫	𑐫𑑂𑐎	𑐫𑑂𑐏	𑐫𑑂𑐐	𑐫𑑂𑐑	𑐫𑑂𑐒	𑐫𑑂𑐔	𑐫𑑂𑐕	𑐫𑑂𑐖	𑐫𑑂𑐗	𑐫𑑂𑐘	𑐫𑑂𑐚	𑐫𑑂𑐛	𑐫𑑂𑐜	𑐫𑑂𑐝	𑐫𑑂𑐞	𑐫𑑂𑐟	𑐫𑑂𑐠	𑐫𑑂𑐡	𑐫𑑂𑐢	𑐫𑑂𑐣	𑐫𑑂𑐥	𑐫𑑂𑐦	𑐫𑑂𑐧	𑐫𑑂𑐨	𑐫𑑂𑐩	𑐫𑑂𑐫	𑐫𑑂𑐬	𑐫𑑂𑐮	𑐫𑑂𑐰	𑐫𑑂𑐱	𑐫𑑂𑐲	𑐫𑑂𑐳	𑐫𑑂𑐴
𑐬	𑐬𑑂𑐎	𑐬𑑂𑐏	𑐬𑑂𑐐	𑐬𑑂𑐑	𑐬𑑂𑐒	𑐬𑑂𑐔	𑐬𑑂𑐕	𑐬𑑂𑐖	𑐬𑑂𑐗	𑐬𑑂𑐘	𑐬𑑂𑐚	𑐬𑑂𑐛	𑐬𑑂𑐜	𑐬𑑂𑐝	𑐬𑑂𑐞	𑐬𑑂𑐟	𑐬𑑂𑐠	𑐬𑑂𑐡	𑐬𑑂𑐢	𑐬𑑂𑐣	𑐬𑑂𑐥	𑐬𑑂𑐦	𑐬𑑂𑐧	𑐬𑑂𑐨	𑐬𑑂𑐩	𑐬𑑂𑐫	𑐬𑑂𑐬	𑐬𑑂𑐮	𑐬𑑂𑐰	𑐬𑑂𑐱	𑐬𑑂𑐲	𑐬𑑂𑐳	𑐬𑑂𑐴
𑐮	𑐮𑑂𑐎	𑐮𑑂𑐏	𑐮𑑂𑐐	𑐮𑑂𑐑	𑐮𑑂𑐒	𑐮𑑂𑐔	𑐮𑑂𑐕	𑐮𑑂𑐖	𑐮𑑂𑐗	𑐮𑑂𑐘	𑐮𑑂𑐚	𑐮𑑂𑐛	𑐮𑑂𑐜	𑐮𑑂𑐝	𑐮𑑂𑐞	𑐮𑑂𑐟	𑐮𑑂𑐠	𑐮𑑂𑐡	𑐮𑑂𑐢	𑐮𑑂𑐣	𑐮𑑂𑐥	𑐮𑑂𑐦	𑐮𑑂𑐧	𑐮𑑂𑐨	𑐮𑑂𑐩	𑐮𑑂𑐫	𑐮𑑂𑐬	𑐮𑑂𑐮	𑐮𑑂𑐰	𑐮𑑂𑐱	𑐮𑑂𑐲	𑐮𑑂𑐳	𑐮𑑂𑐴
𑐰	𑐰𑑂𑐎	𑐰𑑂𑐏	𑐰𑑂𑐐	𑐰𑑂𑐑	𑐰𑑂𑐒	𑐰𑑂𑐔	𑐰𑑂𑐕	𑐰𑑂𑐖	𑐰𑑂𑐗	𑐰𑑂𑐘	𑐰𑑂𑐚	𑐰𑑂𑐛	𑐰𑑂𑐜	𑐰𑑂𑐝	𑐰𑑂𑐞	𑐰𑑂𑐟	𑐰𑑂𑐠	𑐰𑑂𑐡	𑐰𑑂𑐢	𑐰𑑂𑐣	𑐰𑑂𑐥	𑐰𑑂𑐦	𑐰𑑂𑐧	𑐰𑑂𑐨	𑐰𑑂𑐩	𑐰𑑂𑐫	𑐰𑑂𑐬	𑐰𑑂𑐮	𑐰𑑂𑐰	𑐰𑑂𑐱	𑐰𑑂𑐲	𑐰𑑂𑐳	𑐰𑑂𑐴
𑐱	𑐱𑑂𑐎	𑐱𑑂𑐏	𑐱𑑂𑐐	𑐱𑑂𑐑	𑐱𑑂𑐒	𑐱𑑂𑐔	𑐱𑑂𑐕	𑐱𑑂𑐖	𑐱𑑂𑐗	𑐱𑑂𑐘	𑐱𑑂𑐚	𑐱𑑂𑐛	𑐱𑑂𑐜	𑐱𑑂𑐝	𑐱𑑂𑐞	𑐱𑑂𑐟	𑐱𑑂𑐠	𑐱𑑂𑐡	𑐱𑑂𑐢	𑐱𑑂𑐣	𑐱𑑂𑐥	𑐱𑑂𑐦	𑐱𑑂𑐧	𑐱𑑂𑐨	𑐱𑑂𑐩	𑐱𑑂𑐫	𑐱𑑂𑐬	𑐱𑑂𑐮	𑐱𑑂𑐰	𑐱𑑂𑐱	𑐱𑑂𑐲	𑐱𑑂𑐳	𑐱𑑂𑐴
𑐲	𑐲𑑂𑐎	𑐲𑑂𑐏	𑐲𑑂𑐐	𑐲𑑂𑐑	𑐲𑑂𑐒	𑐲𑑂𑐔	𑐲𑑂𑐕	𑐲𑑂𑐖	𑐲𑑂𑐗	𑐲𑑂𑐘	𑐲𑑂𑐚	𑐲𑑂𑐛	𑐲𑑂𑐜	𑐲𑑂𑐝	𑐲𑑂𑐞	𑐲𑑂𑐟	𑐲𑑂𑐠	𑐲𑑂𑐡	𑐲𑑂𑐢	𑐲𑑂𑐣	𑐲𑑂𑐥	𑐲𑑂𑐦	𑐲𑑂𑐧	𑐲𑑂𑐨	𑐲𑑂𑐩	𑐲𑑂𑐫	𑐲𑑂𑐬	𑐲𑑂𑐮	𑐲𑑂𑐰	𑐲𑑂𑐱	𑐲𑑂𑐲	𑐲𑑂𑐳	𑐲𑑂𑐴
𑐳	𑐳𑑂𑐎	𑐳𑑂𑐏	𑐳𑑂𑐐	𑐳𑑂𑐑	𑐳𑑂𑐒	𑐳𑑂𑐔	𑐳𑑂𑐕	𑐳𑑂𑐖	𑐳𑑂𑐗	𑐳𑑂𑐘	𑐳𑑂𑐚	𑐳𑑂𑐛	𑐳𑑂𑐜	𑐳𑑂𑐝	𑐳𑑂𑐞	𑐳𑑂𑐟	𑐳𑑂𑐠	𑐳𑑂𑐡	𑐳𑑂𑐢	𑐳𑑂𑐣	𑐳𑑂𑐥	𑐳𑑂𑐦	𑐳𑑂𑐧	𑐳𑑂𑐨	𑐳𑑂𑐩	𑐳𑑂𑐫	𑐳𑑂𑐬	𑐳𑑂𑐮	𑐳𑑂𑐰	𑐳𑑂𑐱	𑐳𑑂𑐲	𑐳𑑂𑐳	𑐳𑑂𑐴
𑐴	𑐴𑑂𑐎	𑐴𑑂𑐏	𑐴𑑂𑐐	𑐴𑑂𑐑	𑐴𑑂𑐒	𑐴𑑂𑐔	𑐴𑑂𑐕	𑐴𑑂𑐖	𑐴𑑂𑐗	𑐴𑑂𑐘	𑐴𑑂𑐚	𑐴𑑂𑐛	𑐴𑑂𑐜	𑐴𑑂𑐝	𑐴𑑂𑐞	𑐴𑑂𑐟	𑐴𑑂𑐠	𑐴𑑂𑐡	𑐴𑑂𑐢	𑐴𑑂𑐣	𑐴𑑂𑐥	𑐴𑑂𑐦	𑐴𑑂𑐧	𑐴𑑂𑐨	𑐴𑑂𑐩	𑐴𑑂𑐫	𑐴𑑂𑐬	𑐴𑑂𑐮	𑐴𑑂𑐰	𑐴𑑂𑐱	𑐴𑑂𑐲	𑐴𑑂𑐳	𑐴𑑂𑐴

== Comparison with ancestral scripts ==
	a	i	u	e	o	k	kh	g	gh	ṅ	c	ch	j	jh	ñ	ṭ	ṭh	ḍ	ḍh	ṇ	t	th	d	dh	n	p	ph	b	bh	m	y	r	l	v	ś	ṣ	s	h
Brahmi	𑀅	𑀇	𑀉	𑀏	𑀑	𑀓	𑀔	𑀕	𑀖	𑀗	𑀘	𑀙	𑀚	𑀛	𑀜	𑀝	𑀞	𑀟	𑀠	𑀡	𑀢	𑀣	𑀤	𑀥	𑀦	𑀧	𑀨	𑀩	𑀪	𑀫	𑀬	𑀭	𑀮	𑀯	𑀰	𑀱	𑀲	𑀳
Gupta																																						
Siddham																																						
Newar	𑐀	𑐂	𑐄	𑐊	𑐌	𑐎	𑐏	𑐐	𑐑	𑐒	𑐔	𑐕	𑐖	𑐗	𑐘	𑐚	𑐛	𑐜	𑐝	𑐞	𑐟	𑐠	𑐡	𑐢	𑐣	𑐥	𑐦	𑐧	𑐨	𑐩	𑐫	𑐬	𑐮	𑐰	𑐱	𑐲	𑐳	𑐴

== Symbols ==
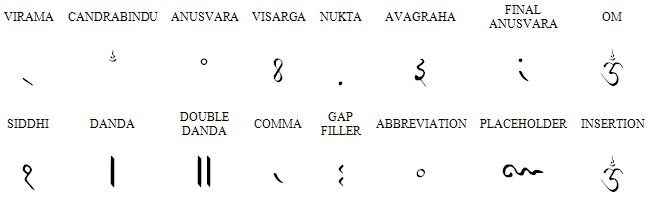

== Numerals ==
𑑐	𑑑	𑑒	𑑓	𑑔	𑑕	𑑖	𑑗	𑑘	𑑙
0	1	2	3	4	5	6	7	8	9

== Sample Text ==
The following sample text is the Newar translation of Article 1 of the Universal Declaration of Human Rights by the United Nations:

𑐢𑐵𑐬𑐵 𑑑: 𑐦𑐸𑐎𑑂𑐎 𑐩𑐣𑐹𑐟 𑐖𑐣𑑂𑐩𑐖𑐵𑐟 𑐳𑑂𑐰𑐟𑐣𑑂𑐟𑑂𑐬 𑐰 𑐥𑑂𑐬𑐟𑐶𑐲𑑂𑐛𑐵 𑐣𑐵𑐥 𑐀𑐢𑐶𑐎𑐵𑐬𑐫𑑂 𑐳𑐩𑐵𑐣 𑐖𑐸𑐂 𑑋 𑐂𑐥𑐶𑑄 𑐰𑐶𑐰𑐾𑐎 𑐰 𑐎𑐵𑐬𑐞𑑄 𑐫𑐸𑐎𑑂𑐟 𑐖𑐸𑐃𑑋 𑐂𑐩𑐶𑐐𑐸 𑐨𑐵𑐟𑐺𑐟𑑂𑐰 𑐨𑐵𑐰𑐣𑐵 𑐎𑐫𑐵 𑐕𑐩𑑂𑐴𑐾𑐳𑑂𑐫𑐵𑑄 𑐩𑐾𑐩𑑂𑐴𑐾𑐳𑐶𑐟 𑐰𑑂𑐫𑐰𑐴𑐵𑐬 𑐫𑐵𑐫𑐾𑐩𑐵𑑅 𑑋

Romanization

Dhārā 1: phukka manūta janmajāta svatantra va pratiṣṭhā nāpa adhikāray samāna jui. ipiṃ viveka va kāraṇaṃ yukta jui. imigu bhātṛtva bhāvanā kayā chamhesyāṃ memhesita vyavahāra yāyemāḥ.

Translation

Article 1: All human beings are born free and equal in dignity and rights. They are endowed with reason and conscience and should act towards one another in a spirit of brotherhood.

== Unicode ==
Newar script was added to the Unicode Standard in June, 2016 with the release of version 9.0.

The Unicode block for Newar, called Newa, is U+11400–U+1147F:

Newa^{[1]}^{[2]} Official Unicode Consortium code chart (PDF)
	0	1	2	3	4	5	6	7	8	9	A	B	C	D	E	F
U+1140x	𑐀	𑐁	𑐂	𑐃	𑐄	𑐅	𑐆	𑐇	𑐈	𑐉	𑐊	𑐋	𑐌	𑐍	𑐎	𑐏
U+1141x	𑐐	𑐑	𑐒	𑐓	𑐔	𑐕	𑐖	𑐗	𑐘	𑐙	𑐚	𑐛	𑐜	𑐝	𑐞	𑐟
U+1142x	𑐠	𑐡	𑐢	𑐣	𑐤	𑐥	𑐦	𑐧	𑐨	𑐩	𑐪	𑐫	𑐬	𑐭	𑐮	𑐯
U+1143x	𑐰	𑐱	𑐲	𑐳	𑐴	𑐵	𑐶	𑐷	𑐸	𑐹	𑐺	𑐻	𑐼	𑐽	𑐾	𑐿
U+1144x	𑑀	𑑁	𑑂	𑑃	𑑄	𑑅	𑑆	𑑇	𑑈	𑑉	𑑊	𑑋	𑑌	𑑍	𑑎	𑑏
U+1145x	𑑐	𑑑	𑑒	𑑓	𑑔	𑑕	𑑖	𑑗	𑑘	𑑙	𑑚	𑑛		𑑝	𑑞	𑑟
U+1146x	𑑠	𑑡														
U+1147x																
Notes 1.As of Unicode version 18.0 2.Grey areas indicate non-assigned code points

== Gallery ==
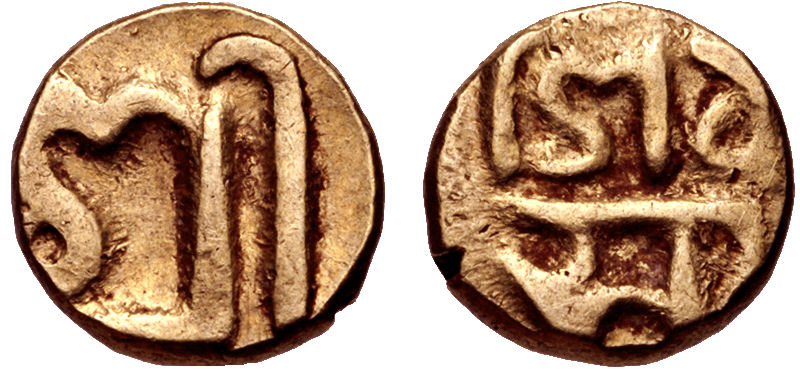
Coin of King Shivadeva (1098–1126 CE).

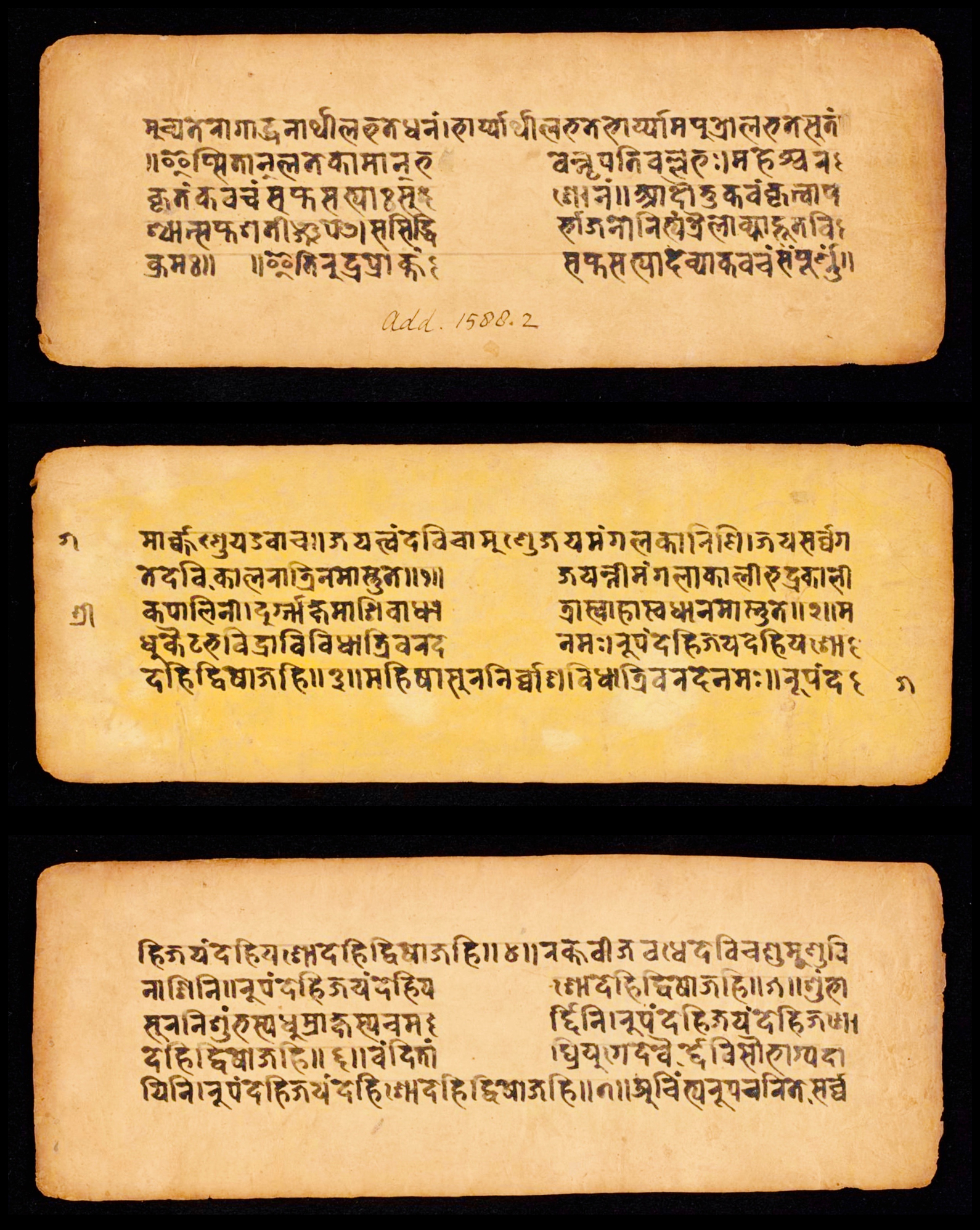
An 11th-century manuscript of Devikavacha stotra.

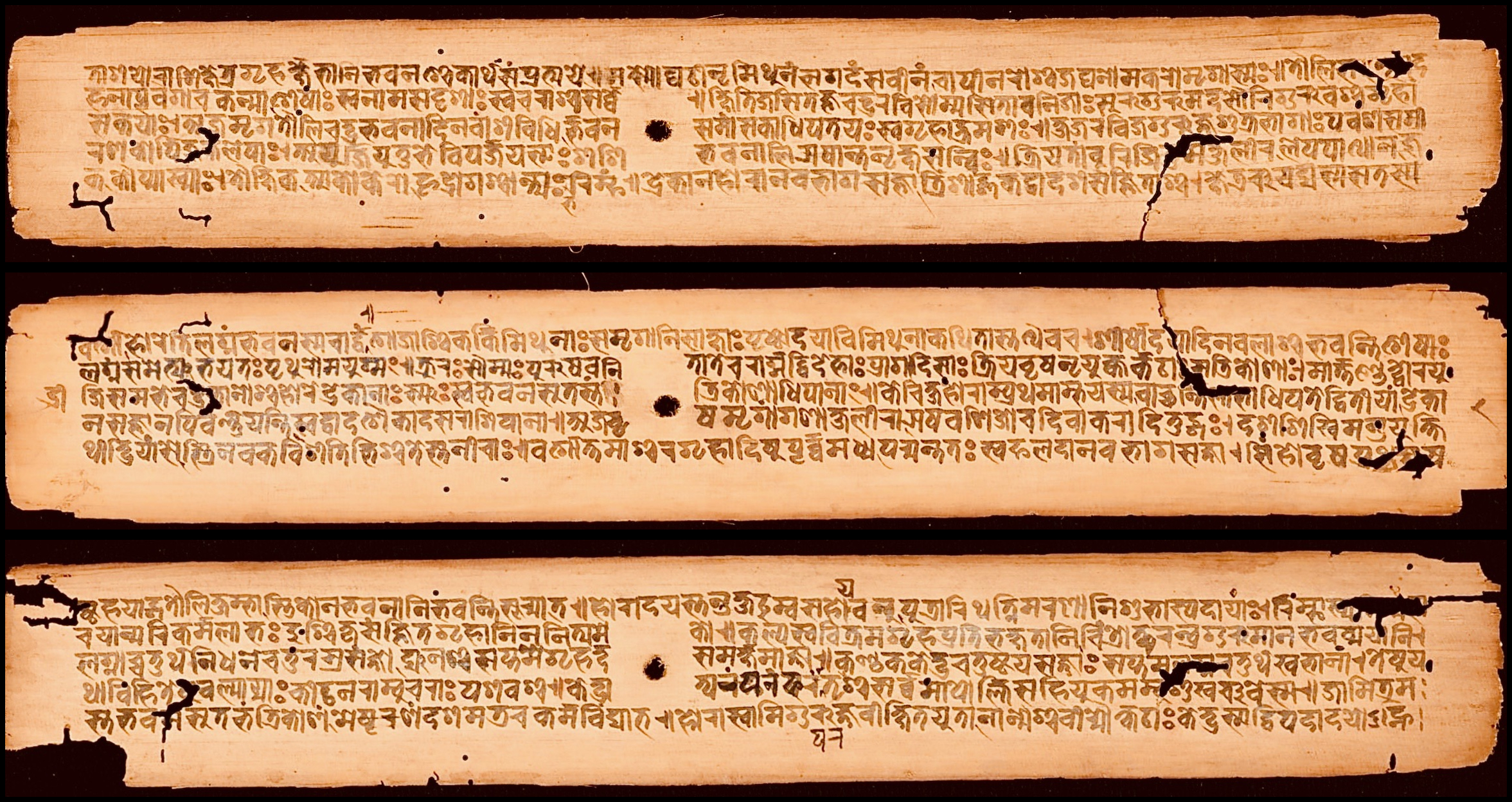
A manuscript of Varāhamihira's Brihat Jataka, 1399 CE.

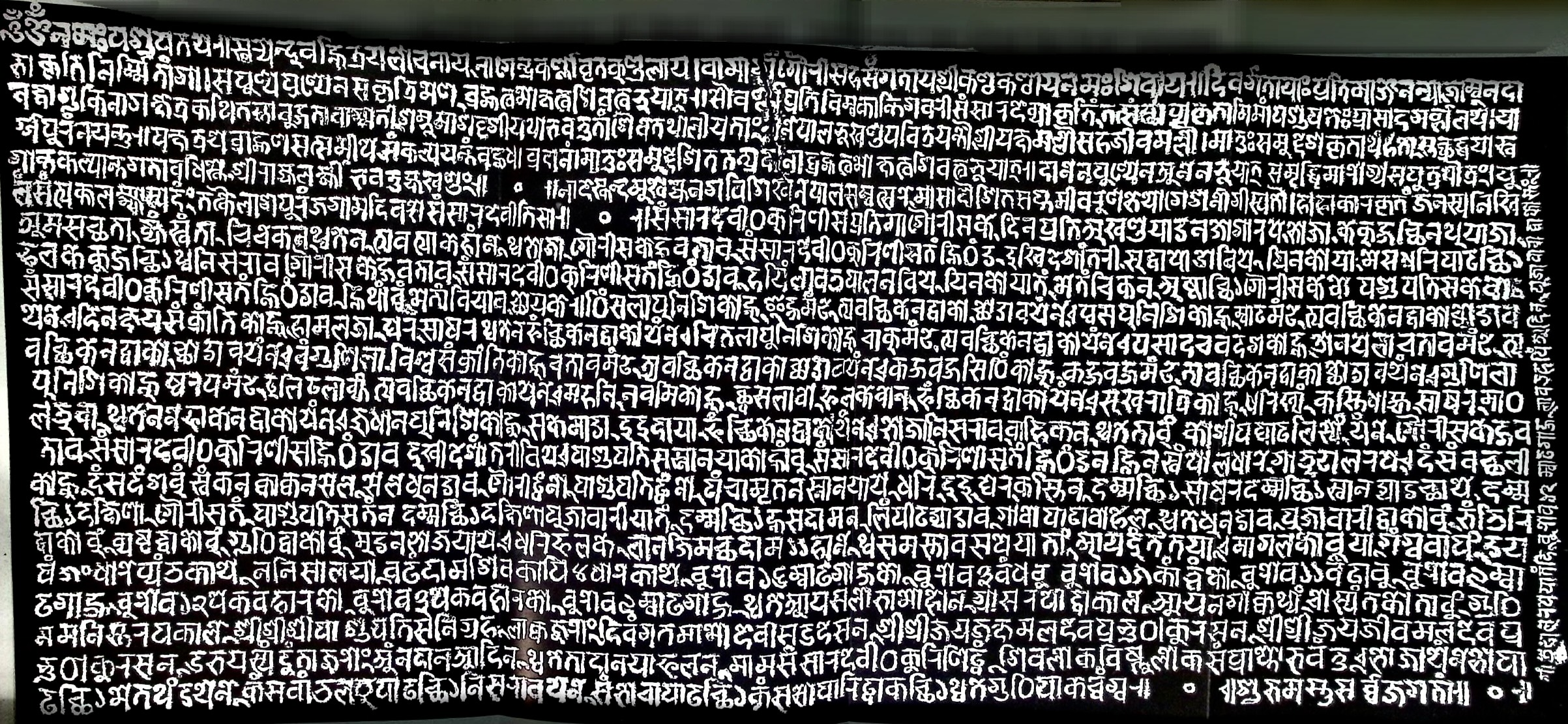
King Yaksha Malla’s copperplate inscription in Newar language, 1446 CE.

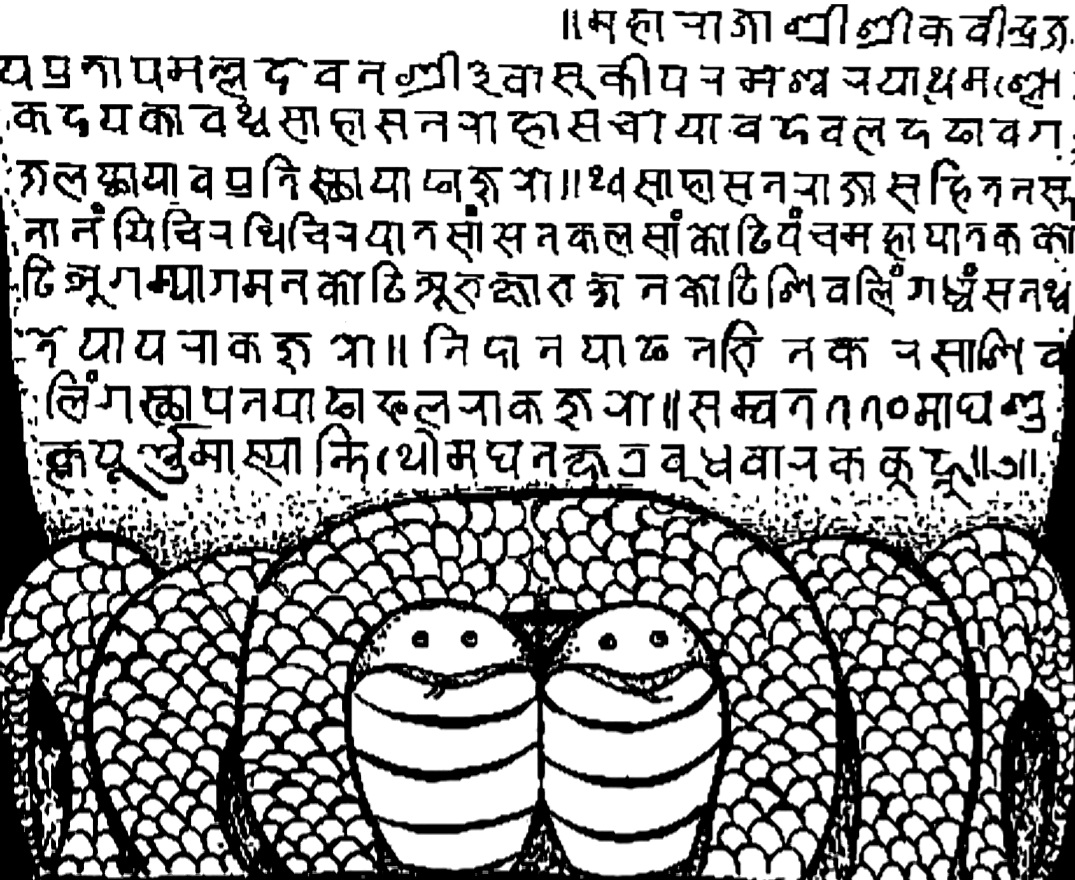
Basuki Temple inscription of Pratap Malla in the Newar script, 1650 CE.

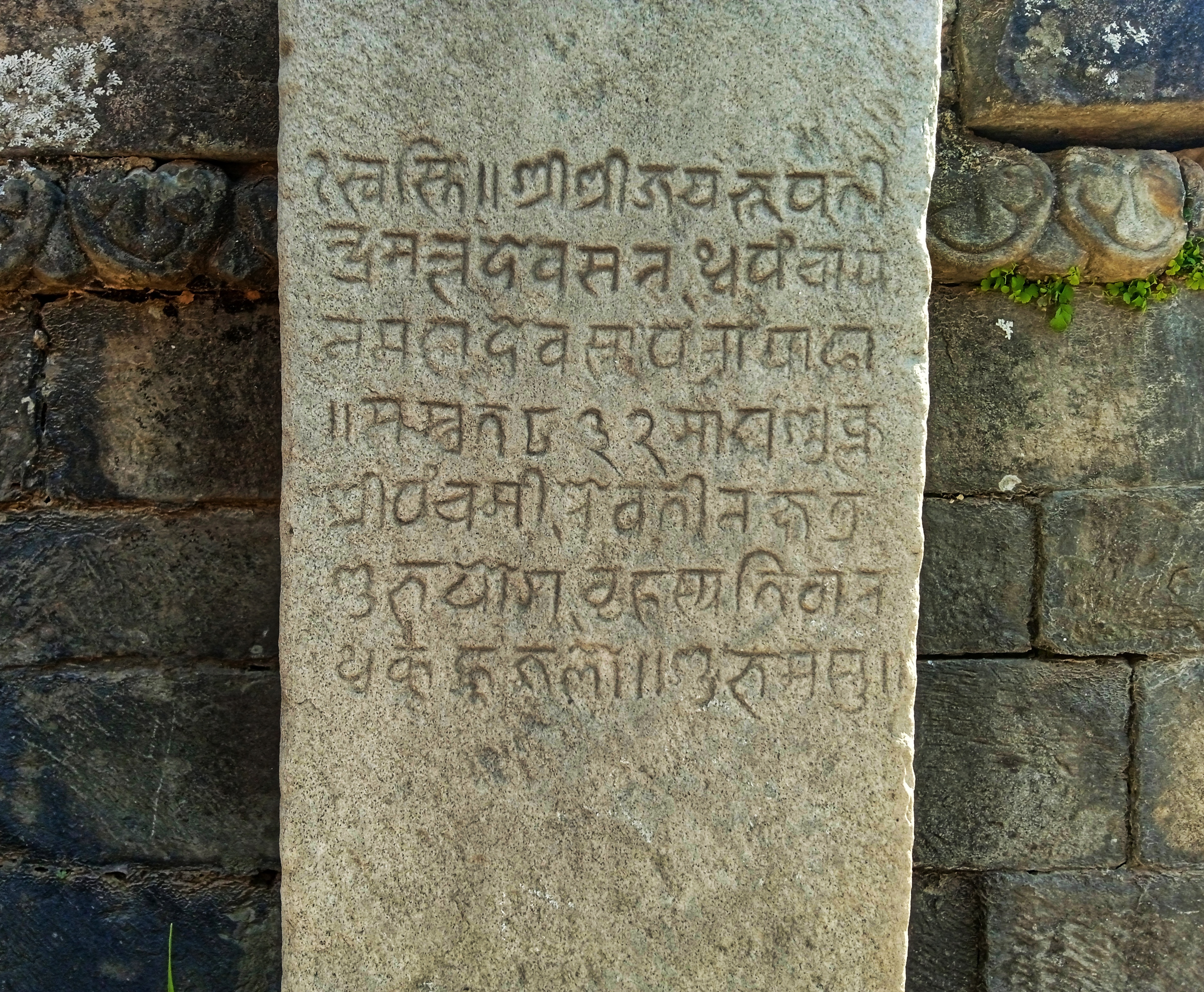
King Bhupatindra Malla's Newar language inscription from 1713 CE.

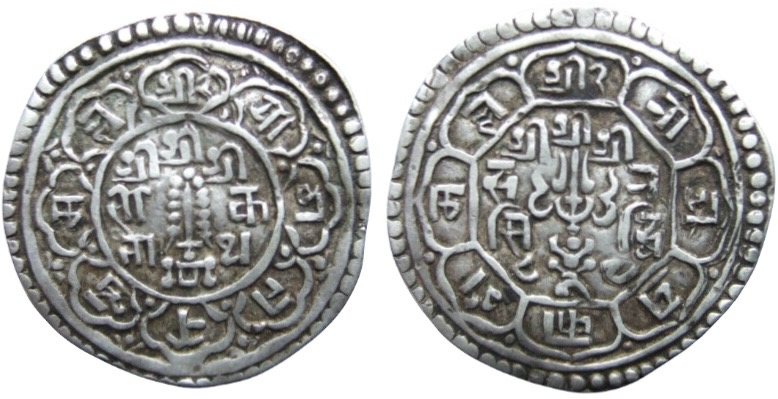
Coin of Rajya Prakash Malla with coin legends in the Newar script, 1745 CE

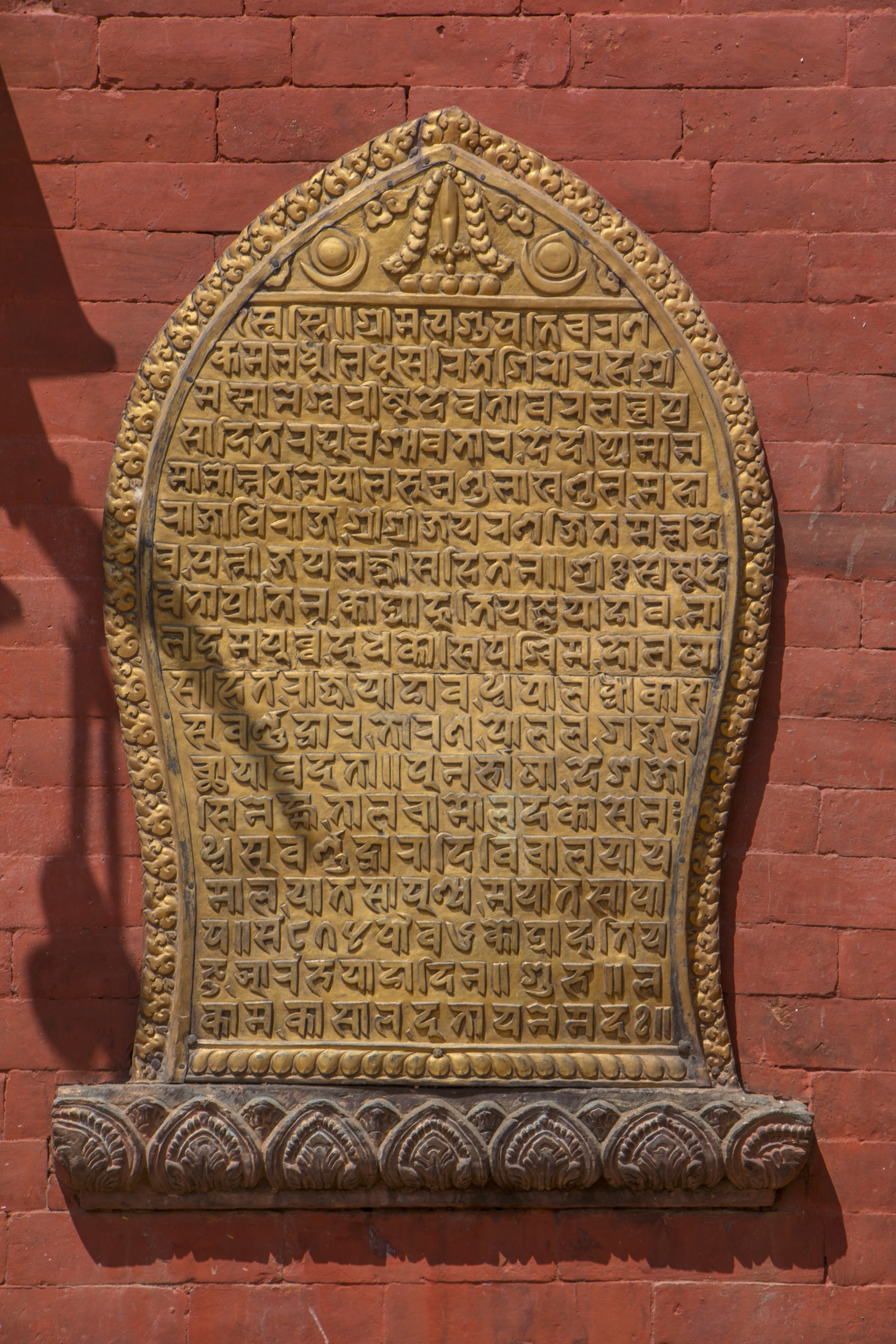
King Ranajit Malla's Newar language inscription from 1754 CE.

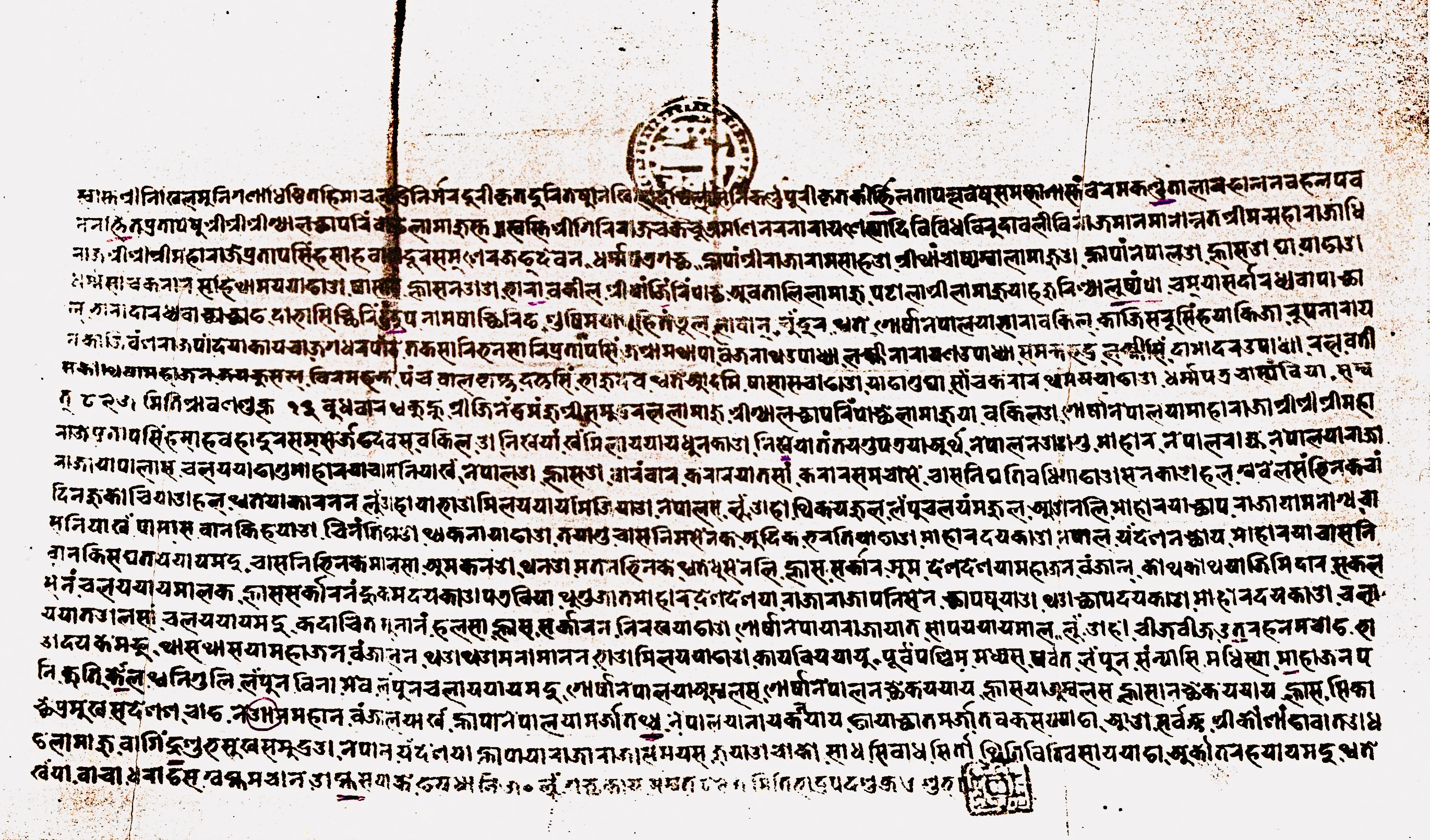
The Nepal-Tibet Treaty of 1775 written in Classical Newar and Newar script.

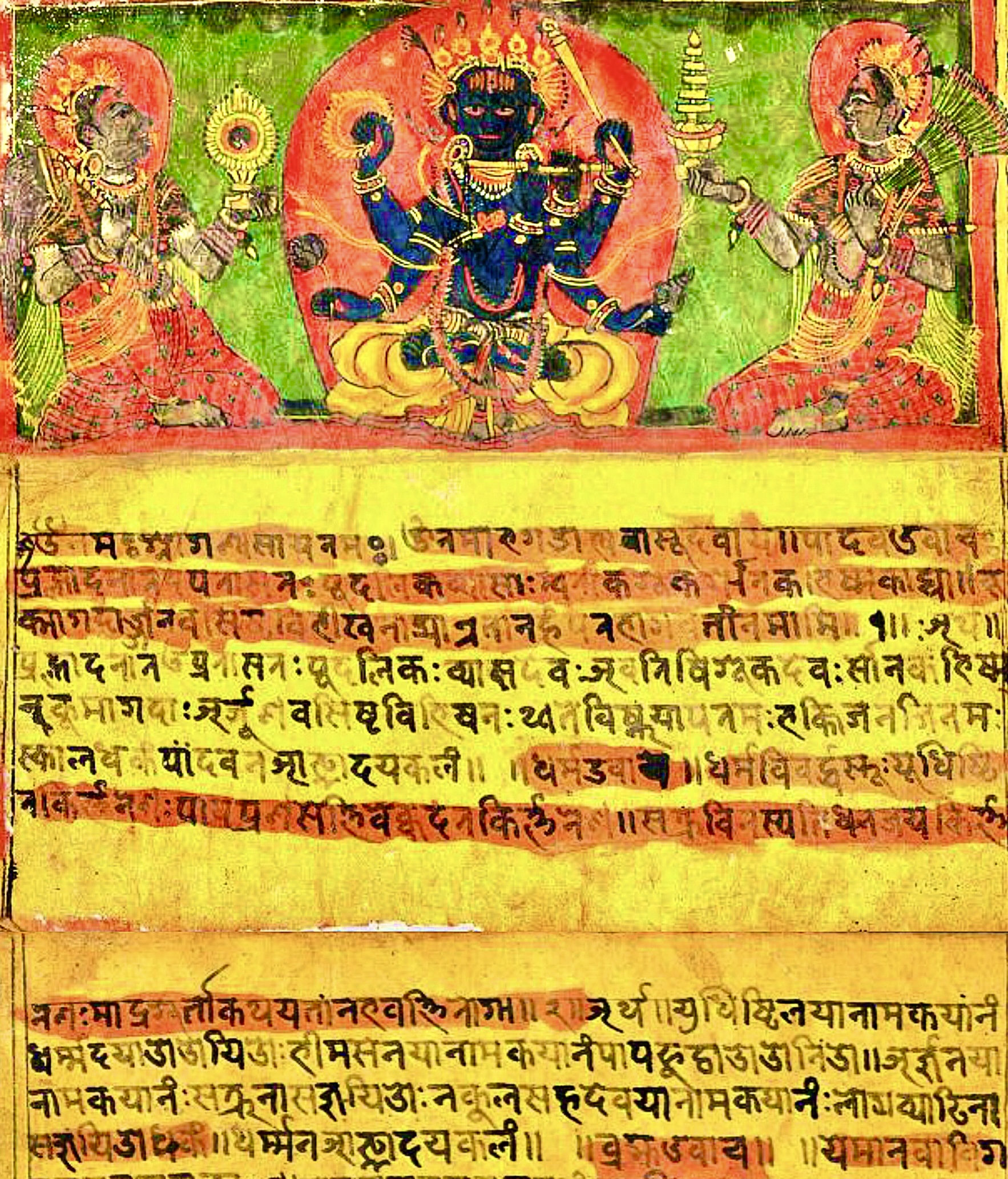
A Newar manuscript of glory of Ekadashi, from 1837 CE.

== See also ==
- Nepalese scripts
- Bhujimol script
