= Newa (Unicode block) =

- Range: U+11400..U+1147F (128 code points)
- Plane: SMP
- Scripts: Newa
- Assigned: 97 code points
- Unused: 31 reserved code points

Unicode version history
- 9.0 (2016): 92 (+92)
- 11.0 (2018): 93 (+1)
- 12.0 (2019): 94 (+1)
- 13.0 (2020): 97 (+3)

Unicode documentation
- Code chart ∣ Web page

Newa is a Unicode block containing characters from the Newa alphabet, which is used to write Nepal Bhasa.

Newa^{[1]}^{[2]} Official Unicode Consortium code chart (PDF)
	0	1	2	3	4	5	6	7	8	9	A	B	C	D	E	F
U+1140x	𑐀	𑐁	𑐂	𑐃	𑐄	𑐅	𑐆	𑐇	𑐈	𑐉	𑐊	𑐋	𑐌	𑐍	𑐎	𑐏
U+1141x	𑐐	𑐑	𑐒	𑐓	𑐔	𑐕	𑐖	𑐗	𑐘	𑐙	𑐚	𑐛	𑐜	𑐝	𑐞	𑐟
U+1142x	𑐠	𑐡	𑐢	𑐣	𑐤	𑐥	𑐦	𑐧	𑐨	𑐩	𑐪	𑐫	𑐬	𑐭	𑐮	𑐯
U+1143x	𑐰	𑐱	𑐲	𑐳	𑐴	𑐵	𑐶	𑐷	𑐸	𑐹	𑐺	𑐻	𑐼	𑐽	𑐾	𑐿
U+1144x	𑑀	𑑁	𑑂	𑑃	𑑄	𑑅	𑑆	𑑇	𑑈	𑑉	𑑊	𑑋	𑑌	𑑍	𑑎	𑑏
U+1145x	𑑐	𑑑	𑑒	𑑓	𑑔	𑑕	𑑖	𑑗	𑑘	𑑙	𑑚	𑑛		𑑝	𑑞	𑑟
U+1146x	𑑠	𑑡														
U+1147x																
Notes: 1. As of Unicode version 17.0; 2. Grey areas indicate non-assigned code points

== History ==
A Unicode character set was initially proposed in May 2011. A previous tentative mapping of the first SMP also included the script and later versions include the proposal. A revised proposal using the name "Newar" is reflected in the roadmap from 6.0.12. This revised proposal was "to enable the broadest representation of the Newar script, from the historical forms of Old Newar manuscripts to the present style of 'Prachalit' known as 'Nepal Lipi'". An alternative proposal was produced by a group of Newars in Kathmandu led by Devdass Manandhar supported by the linguist Tej Ratna Kansakar, which differed in a number of ways from the Pandey proposals, the most significant being the inclusion of a number of breathy (nasalised) consonants which had historically been written with a grapheme that could be mistaken for a conjunct but written the wrong way round.

The following Unicode-related documents record the purpose and process of defining specific characters in the Newa block:

Version	Final code points (Note: Proposed code points and characters names may differ from final code points and names)	Count	L2 ID	WG2 ID	Document
9.0	U+11400..11459, 1145B, 1145D	92	L2/09-325	N3692	Everson, Michael (2009-09-28), Roadmapping the scripts of Nepal
9.0	U+11400..11459, 1145B, 1145D	92	L2/11-152	N4038	Pandey, Anshuman (2011-05-05), Preliminary Proposal to Encode the Prachalit Nepal Script in ISO/IEC 10646
9.0	U+11400..11459, 1145B, 1145D	92	L2/12-031		Anderson, Deborah; McGowan, Rick; Whistler, Ken (2012-01-27), "VII. NEWAR", Review of Indic-related L2 documents and Recommendations to the UTC
9.0	U+11400..11459, 1145B, 1145D	92	L2/12-120	N4322	Manandhar, Dev Dass; Karmacharya, Samir; Chitrakar, Bishnu (2012-02-05), Proposal for the Nepālalipi script in the UCS
9.0	U+11400..11459, 1145B, 1145D	92	L2/12-003R	N4184	Pandey, Anshuman (2012-02-29), Proposal to encode the Newar Script in ISO/IEC 10646
9.0	U+11400..11459, 1145B, 1145D	92	L2/12-147		Anderson, Deborah; McGowan, Rick; Whistler, Ken (2012-04-25), "VI. "NEPĀLALIPI" / "NEWAR"", Review of Indic-related L2 documents and Recommendations to the UTC
9.0	U+11400..11459, 1145B, 1145D	92	L2/12-200R		Whistler, Ken (2012-06-04), On the encoding of the "Nepaalalipi" / "Newar" script
9.0	U+11400..11459, 1145B, 1145D	92	L2/12-244		Manandhar, Dev Dass (2012-07-21), Response to L2/12-200 "On the encoding of the 'Nepaalalipi' / 'Newar' script"
9.0	U+11400..11459, 1145B, 1145D	92	L2/12-245		Manandhar, Dev Dass (2012-07-21), Ancillary materials on "breathy consonants" in "Nepaalalipi"
9.0	U+11400..11459, 1145B, 1145D	92	L2/12-336	N4372	Sinclair, Iain (2012-10-22), Letter in support of N4184 and encoding the Newar script in ISO/IEC 10646
9.0	U+11400..11459, 1145B, 1145D	92	L2/12-349		Manandhar, Dev Dass; Karmacharya, Samir; Chitrakar, Bishnu (2012-10-29), Proposal for the Nepaalalipi script in the UCS
9.0	U+11400..11459, 1145B, 1145D	92	L2/12-378		Anderson, Deborah; McGowan, Rick; Whistler, Ken (2012-11-05), "I. NEWAR/NEPAALALIPI", Review of Indic-related documents and Recommendations to the UTC
9.0	U+11400..11459, 1145B, 1145D	92	L2/12-390		Anderson, Deborah (2012-11-08), Comparison between Newar and Nepaalalipi proposals (L2/12-003 and L2/12-349)
9.0	U+11400..11459, 1145B, 1145D	92	L2/12-343R2		Moore, Lisa (2012-12-04), "D.8", UTC #133 Minutes
9.0	U+11400..11459, 1145B, 1145D	92	L2/13-029		Manandhar, Dev Dass; Chitrakar, Bishnu; Karmacharya, Samir (2013-01-28), To Unicode Technical Committee (UTC)
9.0	U+11400..11459, 1145B, 1145D	92	L2/14-086		Manandhar, Dev Dass; Karmacharya, Samir; Chitrakar, Bishnu (2014-04-10), Proposal to Encode Nepaalalipi Script in ISO/IEC 10646
9.0	U+11400..11459, 1145B, 1145D	92	L2/14-129		Anderson, Deborah; Whistler, Ken; McGowan, Rick; Pournader, Roozbeh (2014-05-02), "1", Recommendations to UTC #139 May 2014 on Script Proposals
9.0	U+11400..11459, 1145B, 1145D	92	L2/14-220		Anderson, Deborah (2014-09-23), Comparison between Newar and Nepaalalipi proposals (L2/12-003 and L2/14-086)
9.0	U+11400..11459, 1145B, 1145D	92	L2/14-253		Anderson, Deborah (2014-10-06), Recommendations to UTC from Script Meeting in Nepal
9.0	U+11400..11459, 1145B, 1145D	92	L2/14-258	N4602	Pandey, Anshuman (2014-10-22), Response to the Recommendation for Nepalese Scripts in L2/14-253
9.0	U+11400..11459, 1145B, 1145D	92	L2/14-268R		Anderson, Deborah; Whistler, Ken; McGowan, Rick; Pournader, Roozbeh; Iancu, Laurențiu; Glass, Andrew; Constable, Peter; Suignard, Michel (2014-10-27), "5. Nepaalalipi/Newar", Recommendations to UTC #141 October 2014 on Script Proposals
9.0	U+11400..11459, 1145B, 1145D	92	L2/14-281		Whistler, Ken (2014-10-27), Rationale for Atomic Encoding of Murmured Resonants in Newa
9.0	U+11400..11459, 1145B, 1145D	92	L2/14-290	N4552	Pandey, Anshuman (2014-10-28), Specimen Showing Representation of Murmured Consonants in the Newar Script
9.0	U+11400..11459, 1145B, 1145D	92	L2/14-250		Moore, Lisa (2014-11-10), "Consensus 141-C23", UTC #141 Minutes, "Accept 92 Newa characters at U+11400..U+1145D, omitting U+1145A and U+1145C, with block Newa U+11400..U+1147F and properties as given in L2/14-12-003, for encoding in Unicode 9.0. See L2/14-285."
9.0	U+11400..11459, 1145B, 1145D	92	L2/14-285R3	N4660	Whistler, Ken (2014-12-04), Towards a Consensus Encoding of Newa
11.0	U+1145E	1	L2/16-383	N4816	A, Srinidhi; A, Sridatta (2016-12-23), Proposal to encode the SANDHI MARK for Newa
11.0	U+1145E	1	L2/17-037		Anderson, Deborah; Whistler, Ken; Pournader, Roozbeh; Glass, Andrew; Iancu, Laurențiu; Moore, Lisa; Liang, Hai; Ishida, Richard; Misra, Karan; McGowan, Rick (2017-01-21), "9. Newa", Recommendations to UTC #150 January 2017 on Script Proposals
11.0	U+1145E	1	L2/17-016		Moore, Lisa (2017-02-08), "D.3.1", UTC #150 Minutes
11.0	U+1145E	1	L2/17-130		Anderson, Deborah (2017-04-19), Comments on L2/16-322 and L2/16-383, Sandhi marks for Bengali and Newa
11.0	U+1145E	1	L2/17-153		Anderson, Deborah (2017-05-17), "4. Bengali and Newa", Recommendations to UTC #151 May 2017 on Script Proposals
11.0	U+1145E	1	L2/17-103		Moore, Lisa (2017-05-18), "D.3 Sandhi Mark", UTC #151 Minutes
12.0	U+1145F	1	L2/17-093	N4865	A, Srinidhi; A, Sridatta (2017-04-08), Proposal to encode the NEWA LETTER VEDIC ANUSVARA
12.0	U+1145F	1	L2/17-255		Anderson, Deborah; Whistler, Ken; Pournader, Roozbeh; Moore, Lisa; Liang, Hai (2017-07-28), "7. Indic Editorial Updates", Recommendations to UTC #152 July-August 2017 on Script Proposals
12.0	U+1145F	1	L2/17-222		Moore, Lisa (2017-08-11), "D.6.1", UTC #152 Minutes
12.0	U+1145F	1		N4953 (pdf, doc)	"M66.16d", Unconfirmed minutes of WG 2 meeting 66, 2018-03-23
13.0	U+1145A	1	L2/12-003R	N4184	Pandey, Anshuman (2012-02-29), Proposal to encode the Newar Script in ISO/IEC 10646
13.0	U+1145A	1	L2/17-440	N4933	A, Srinidhi; A, Sridatta (2017-12-24), Proposal to encode the DOUBLE COMMA for Newa
13.0	U+1145A	1	L2/18-039		Anderson, Deborah; Whistler, Ken; Pournader, Roozbeh; Moore, Lisa; Liang, Hai; Cook, Richard (2018-01-19), "16. Newa", Recommendations to UTC #154 January 2018 on Script Proposals
13.0	U+1145A	1	L2/18-115		Moore, Lisa (2018-05-09), "D.4.2", UTC #155 Minutes
13.0	U+11460..11461	2	L2/17-369R	N4932	A, Srinidhi; A, Sridatta (2017-12-08), Proposal to encode JIHVAMULIYA and UPADHMANIYA for Newa
13.0	U+11460..11461	2	L2/17-364		McGowan, Rick (2017-10-09), "Indic_Syllabic_Category of Newa jihvamuliya and upadhmaniya", Comments on Public Review Issues (July 26 - October 13, 2017)
13.0	U+11460..11461	2	L2/18-039		Anderson, Deborah; Whistler, Ken; Pournader, Roozbeh; Moore, Lisa; Liang, Hai; Cook, Richard (2018-01-19), "16. Newa", Recommendations to UTC #154 January 2018 on Script Proposals
13.0	U+11460..11461	2	L2/18-115		Moore, Lisa (2018-05-09), "D.4.1", UTC #155 Minutes
13.0	U+11460..11461	2		N5020 (pdf, doc)	Umamaheswaran, V. S. (2019-01-11), "10.3.5", Unconfirmed minutes of WG 2 meeting 67
