= Dolakha =

Dolakha may refer to:

Dolakha is a himalayan district of Nepal located in central eastern part of Nepal. This place is famous for its Dolakha Bhimsen temple, Kalinchowk Temple, Sailing, Jiri, Rolwaling mountain range and Tshrolpa lake.

- Dolakha District, a district of Nepal
- Dolakha Town, Nepal, a city in Nepal

== See also ==
- Dolakhae dialect, a dialect of the Newari language spoken in Nepal's Dolakha District
