= Pahri language =

Pahri is a rare alternative spelling for either:

- the Sino-Tibetan Pahari language of Nepal
- the Indo-Aryan Pahari language of Kashmir

== See also ==
- Pahari language, several languages
