= Newar language =

Sino-Tibetan language of central-eastern Nepal

Newar
- Nepal Bhasa
- 𑐣𑐾𑐥𑐵𑐮 𑐨𑐵𑐲𑐵 / 𑐣𑐾𑐰𑐵𑑅 𑐨𑐵𑐫𑑂 Nepāla Bhāṣā / Nevāḥ Bhāy
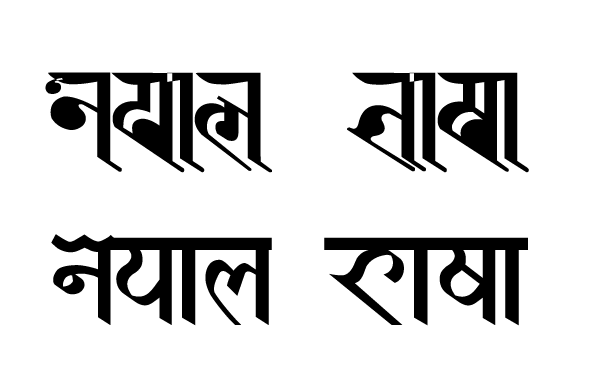
- Nepāla Bhāṣā written in the Ranjana script and the Newar script
- Pronunciation: [neːpaːl bʱaːsaː] [newaː bʱæː]
- Native to: Nepal
- Region: Nepal Mandala
- Ethnicity: 1.3 million Newars (2021 census)
- Native speakers: 880,000 (2021 census)
- Language family: Sino-Tibetan: Tibeto-Burman (?); Newaric; Newar
- Early forms: Proto-Newar: Classical Newar
- Dialects: Kathmandu-Lalitpur; Bhaktapur; Dolakha; Chitlang; Pahari
- Writing system: Newar script; Bhujimol script; Ranjana script; Devanagari script; Various other Nepalese scripts

Official status
- Official language in: Nepal; Bagmati Province; India; Sikkim; Historical: Kingdoms of Nepal Mandala; Kingdom of Kantipur; Kingdom of Lalitpur; Kingdom of Bhaktapur
- Regulated by: Nepal Bhasa Academy

Language codes
- ISO 639-2: new Nepal Bhasa, Newari
- ISO 639-3: Variously: new – Newari nwx – Middle Newar phj – Pahari Newar
- Glottolog: newa1247
- Map of most spoken languages in Nepal with Newar labeled as 22.

- Newar is classified as Definitely Endangered by the UNESCO Atlas of the World's Languages in Danger.

Newar (English: /nəˈwɑːr/; 𑐣𑐾𑐥𑐵𑐮 𑐨𑐵𑐲𑐵, Nepāla Bhāṣā) is a Sino-Tibetan language of central Nepal belonging to the Tibeto-Burman group. It is spoken natively by the Newar people, the indigenous inhabitants of Nepal Mandala, which consists of the Kathmandu Valley and surrounding regions in Nepal. The name Nepal Bhasa was historically used for the language and is also the name used in official contexts by the Government of Nepal. This name is also preferred by native speakers and writers of the language. Another name frequently used is Newari, but this name is considered inappropriate by Newars due to the addition of the Indic -i suffix and it has become increasingly common to refer to the language as Newar in English. (Note: "The Newars themselves, some of whom find the term 'Newar' to be an oppressive reminder of their colonization by the Gorkhas in the 18th century."; "Some people in the Newar community, including some prominent Newar linguists, consider the derivational suffix -i found in the term Newari to constitute an 'Indianization' of the language name. These people thus hold the opinion that the term Newari is non-respectful of Newar culture.")

Newar was the official language of Nepal during the medieval period, having been given this status by Jayasthiti Malla in the 14th century. The language during this period was consistently referred as "nepāla bhāṣā", a term which literally means "Nepalese Language". Despite the similar nomenclature, It is distinct from the Nepali language, an Indo-Aryan language which replaced Newar as the national language after the conquest of Nepal by the Shah Dynasty, and additionally only adopted the name Nepali in the 1930s.

From the start of the Rana dynasty in the 1840s until democratization, Newar suffered from official suppression. From 1952 to 1991, the percentage of Newar speakers in the Kathmandu Valley dropped from 75% to 44% and today Newar culture and language are under threat. Today, the language has been listed as "Definitely endangered" by UNESCO.

Newar is one of four Tibeto-Burman languages with an old literary tradition, with the other three being Tibetan, Burmese, and Meitei. Literature in Newar is one of the oldest in Nepal, dating back to at least 600 years ago. Many of the literature written in Newar, like the Gopal Raj Vamshavali and Manava Nyaya Shastra are important in the study of the history of Nepal. On 6 May 2024, Newar, along with Tamang and Nepali was declared as the official language of Bagmati Province. Similarly, Newar is given official status in the Indian state of Sikkim and several city governments of Nepal including the capital Kathmandu.

== Name ==
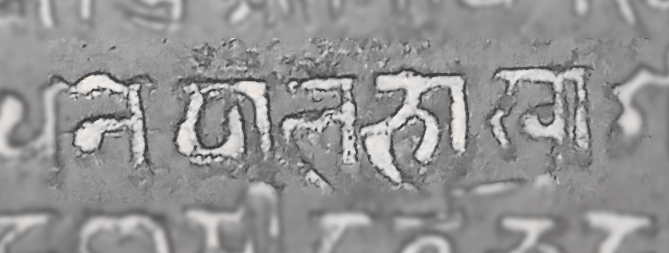
A line from an inscription dated 1706 using the term "Nepāla Bhāṣā" in Newar script to refer to the language.

The official and historical name of the language, Nepal Bhasa, which literally means Nepalese Language, originates from Nepal. Historically, Nepal was only used to refer to the Kathmandu Valley and its surroundings, where the language was native to. (Note: The term Nepa Valley is still used among the native Newar population and local governments to refer to the Kathmandu Valley while senior citizens still tend to refer the valley as Nepal. A government report from 1961 describes the valley being grouped as Kathmandu District, which is different from today's Kathmandu District, marks the commencement of referring the valley as Kathmandu Valley.)

The name "Nepal Bhasa" has been used consistently in sources from the Malla dynasty to refer to the language. The earliest occurrences of the name Nepālabhāṣā (Devanāgarī: नेपालभाषा, "Nepalese language") or alternatively Nepālavāca (Devanāgarī: नेपालवाच, "Nepalese speech"), used to refer to the language, can be found in the manuscripts of a commentary to the Nāradasaṃhitā, dated 1380, and a commentary to the Amarkośa, dated 1386. Some sources from the Malla Dynasty refer to the language as deśabhāṣā (Newar Script: 𑐡𑐾𑐱𑐨𑐵𑐲𑐵, lit. 'language of the country') or svadeśabhāṣā (Newar Script: 𑐳𑑂𑐰𑐡𑐾𑐱𑐨𑐵𑐲𑐵, lit. 'language of one's own country'). Similarly, the language was referred to as Nepalese in sources of some 18th-century Capuchin missionaries like in the journal Cassiano Beligatti who visited Nepal in the 1740s.

In contrast, the name Newar did not even appear in the written record before the 17th century and William Kirkpatrick was one of the first Western scholars to use the term Newar for the language in his 1811 book. Newar was also used in the travelogue of a few 18th-century European missionaries to refer to the people or the land of Nepal. For instance, Ippolito Desideri who visited Nepal in 1721 used the term Neuâr to refer to the inhabitants of Nepal. Similarly, in one of the books written by the Capuchin mission in the 1740s, Nepal is referred as the kingdom of "Newar or Nepal".

The origin of the word Newar is generally believed to be related to the word Nepal, possibly derived by the replacement of the 'la' sound with a 'ra' sound, a common practice in historical documents from Nepal. Historically, "Newar" rarely used appeared in native sources as well. Only two sources in Nepal from before the Gorkhali rule use the term "Newar" to refer to the language or its script; the multilingual stone inscription of Pratap Malla uses "nevāra ākhara" ("newar alphabet") to refer to the Newar script and another stone inscription of Pratap Malla from 1652 uses the term nevārabhāṣā ("newar language") to refer to the language.

The term "Newari", derived from the Indianization of "Newar" was first used by Brian Hodgson in 1847 and since then used by most western scholars. In one case, Shakya noted that Cecil Bendall in his translation of a Newar manuscript, used the term Newari to refer to the language although the manuscript he translated used the word Nepala Bhasa. However, the name Newari is considered inappropriate by Newar speakers due to the addition of the Indic suffix -i and it has become increasingly common to refer to the language as Newar in English.

In the 1920s, the language known as Khas Kura, Gorkhali or Parbatiya was renamed to Nepali. Conversely, the term Gorkhali in the former national anthem entitled "Shreeman Gambhir" was changed to Nepali in 1951. Gorkhā Bhāṣā Prakāśinī Samiti (Gorkha Language Publishing Committee), a government institution established in 1913 (B.S. 1970) for advancement of Gorkha Bhasa, renamed itself as Nepālī Bhāṣā Prakāśinī Samiti (Nepali Language Publishing Committee) in 1933 (B.S. 1990), which is currently known as Sājhā Prakāśana.

On 7 September 1995, the cabinet of ministers decided to use "Nepal Bhasa" instead of "Newari". On 13 November 1998, the Minister of Information and Communication issued another directive to use the name Nepal Bhasa instead of Newari. Similarly, the Central Bureau of Statistics have started to use the name "Nepal Bhasa" since the 2021 Nepal census.

== History and development ==
=== Origin ===
The precise position of Newar within the Tibeto-Burman language family remains unresolved and it does not fit neatly into any established sub-group. In 1992, Van Driem proposed a genetic link between Newar and the Kirati languages based primarily on shared verbal agreement morphology—notably a third-person patient-marking suffix reconstructed as Proto-Tibeto Burman *-u which is retained in the Kiranti languages and Dolakha Newar, and thus grouped the Newar language with Kiranti in the sub-group of Mahakiranti language. Van Driem later expanded this hypothesis to include Thangmi and Baram alongside Newar in this group. However, after a fieldwork on the Gongduk language in Bhutan, Van Driem discovered the same morphological trait in Gongduk, that he had previsouly theorized united the Mahakiranti group, and thus Van Driem retracted the Mahakiranti theory and instead proposed a narrower "Newaric" sub-group consisting of Newar, Baram and Thangmi.

The Newaric hypothesis remains the most widely cited proposal for Newar's closest relatives, supported by Turin's lexical research identifying over thirty likely cognates specific to Thangmi and Classical Newar. Though, this theory has still not reached scholarly consensus as the linguist Tej Ratna Kansakar, among others, attribute the lexical similarity between Newar and Thangmi to language contact and borrowing.

According to the linguist Glover, Newar and Chepang must have diverged around 2200 BC. It is estimated that Newar shares 28% of its vocabulary with Chepang. At the same time, a very large and significant proportion of Newari vocabulary is Indo-European in origin, by one estimate more than 50%, indicating an influence of at least 1,600 years from Indo-European languages, first from Sanskrit, Maithili, Persian, and Urdu and today from Hindi, Nepali and English.

=== Proto-Newar ===
The Newar language is first attested in the stone inscriptions from the Liccahvi period (400–879 CE), which represent the earliest available historical sources in Nepal and the current evidence suggests that Newar existed as a vernacular language since the Licchavi period. Although these inscriptions are written in Sanskrit in Gupta characters, an analysis of 190 inscriptions between 464 and 877 CE done by linguist KP Malla found the presence of 246 non-Sanskritic nominals mostly in the form of toponyms and hydronyms but some in the form of tax office nominal as well as personal names. These nominals were identified by Malla as belonging to a Tibeto-Burman language and based on formal, lexical and diachronic analysis, which showed that most of these nominals constituted an earlier form of the nominals still in use in Modern Newar, he concluded that these nominals belonged to an early form of the Newar language which Malla dubbed as "Proto Newari".

As an example of the diachronic continuity, the toponym khopṛiṅa attested in an inscription from 561 CE survives in modern Newar as khopa, the native name for Bhaktapur, narapṛiṅa first attested in 490 CE survives in Modern Newar as nara, the native name of the town of Harigaon and jolapṛiṅa first attested in 631 survive as jala, the native name for the town of Harisiddhi. Recent research suggest that almost 80 percent of the names of places, taxes and merchandise used in the inscriptions from the Licchavi period are Tibeto-Burman in origin.

=== Classical Newar ===
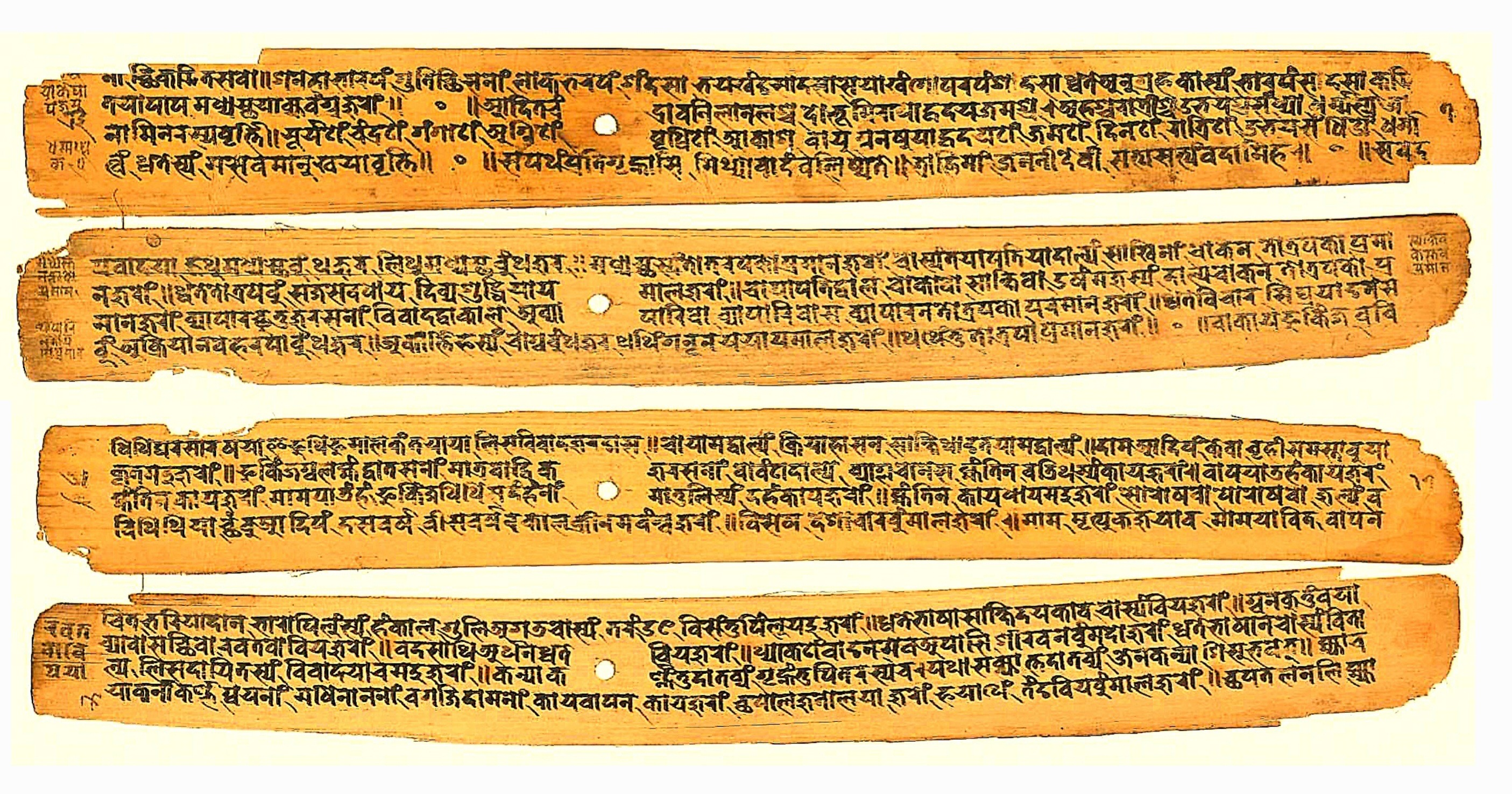
A 14th century palm-leaf manuscript of the Manava Nyaya Shastra, a law book written in Newar language and the Bhujimola script.

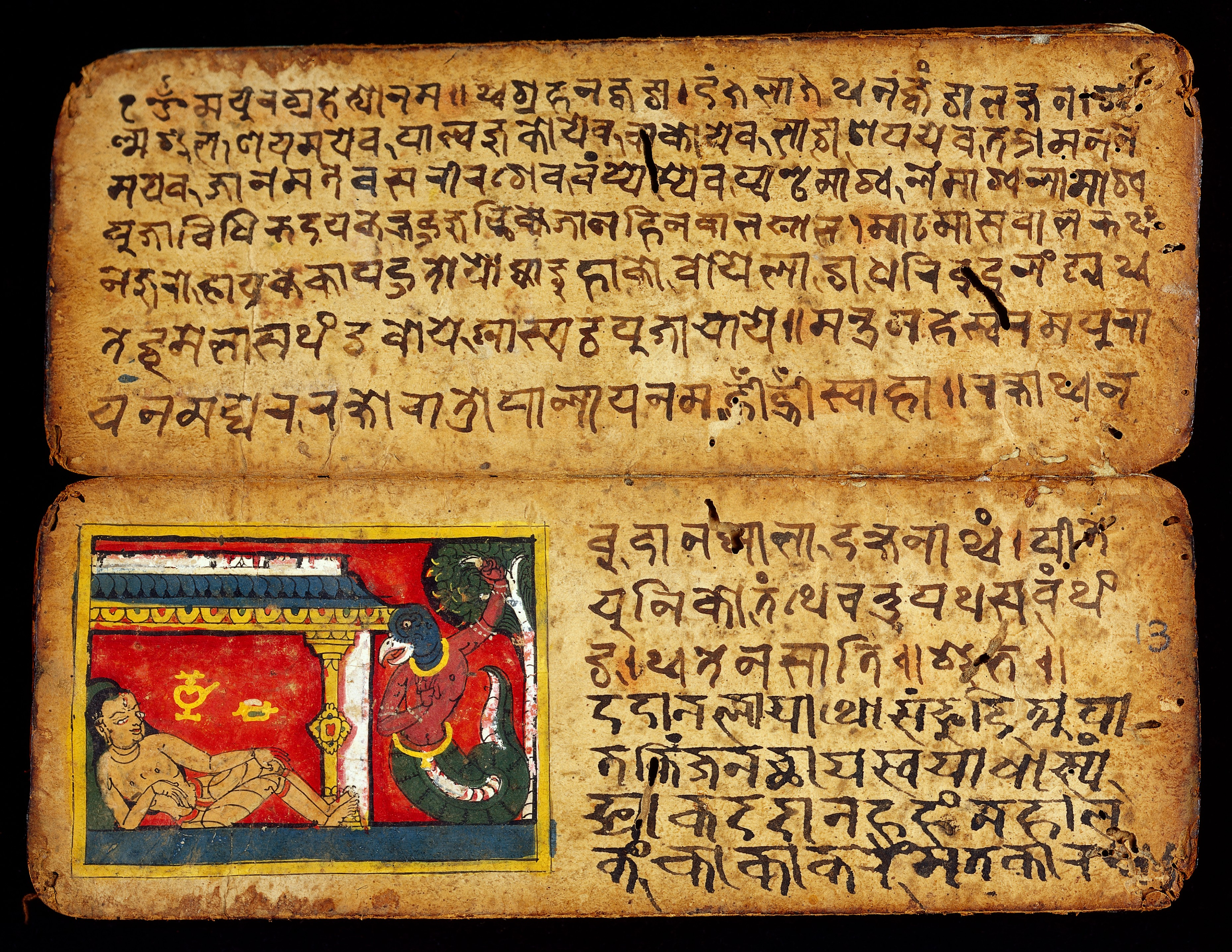
A page from an Astrology book from 1480 written in Newar.

A page from the Nepala Bhasaya Gita, a poetry book of Jagat Prakasha Malla, 1671 CE.

Following the Licchavi period, Sanskrit remained the dominant language of written sources in Nepal with Newar appearing more commonly since the 12th century. The earliest dated document written entirely in Newar that has been found till date, a palm-leaf manuscript preserved in Uku Bāhā, a Buddhist monastery in Lalitpur, dates from 1114 (NS 234). Following is a line from the document which mostly deals with business transaction.

chu pulēṃga kītya bipāra vastra bivu mikhā tivu maduguna chu sāta duguna valhe

Translation:

The community should keep an eye on what remains and replace for what is lost, with a remaining object or gift rightly sold out, give some clothes.

Newar also started to be used as the language of royal epigraphy from the 12th century, as the earliest dated inscription in Newar from the royal family is one from an edict at the Bajrayogini Temple of Rudradeva from 1173 (NS 293).

The form of the Newar language used since the Uku Bāhā palm leaf to the sources of the 18th century is referred to as Classical Newar. Scholars like Otter and Tamot further divide the period into Old Newar (or Early Classical Newar), referring to the language before the 16th century and Classical Newar (or Late Classical Newar), referring to the language used between the 16th and 18th century. Tamot prefers the separation between these two forms based on political events; with Late Classical Newar appearing from 1482 when the united Nepala Mandala was divided among the children of Yaksha Malla.

The reign of Jayasthiti Malla in the 14th century saw the first ever translations of Sanskrit classics into Newar like the Manav Nyaya Shastra as well as original Newar works like the Gopal Raj Vamshavali, leading some scholars like Pal to conclude that Jayasthiti Malla had elevated Newar to the status of national language. Since his reign, most royal decrees, official proclamations and public notices set up by the monarchs as well as an overwhelming number of stone inscriptions in the Kathmandu Valley, where they are a ubiquitous element at heritage sites, are in Newar.

The period from 1428 to 1769 is also considered a Golden Age for Newar Literature. Many monarchs of the Malla dynasty themselves started composing hymns and dramas in Newar. Noted royal writers include Mahindra Malla, Siddhi Narsingh Malla, and Ranajit Malla. Still, there are numerous works of literature from this period with anonymous authors. Some non royal authors include Keshav Udās, Brisabhānanda and Biladātāsingha.

Some notable women who wrote literature in Newar during this period include, Jagatakeshari from Banepa, Briddhi Lakshmi (queen consort of Bhaktapur), Riddhi Lakshmi (mother of Bhupalendra Malla), Jaya Lakshmi (queen consort of Yoga Narendra Malla). Among them, Riddhi Lakshmi is considered to be the first woman to publish literature in Nepal as her poems are the earliest dated literature in Nepal authored by a woman.

During the 18th century, Newar also began to catch the interest of Capuchin friars from Italy who had started to settle in Nepal. By the time the mission ended in 1769 with the expulsion of all Christians by the Gorkhalis, the Capuchins had written many literature in Newar, including translations of several catechisms and apologetics and several Newar-Italian dictionaries.

An example of the language used during this period is provided by the following lines from a poem in the nepāla bhāṣāyā gita written in 1671 by Jagat Prakasha Malla.

yogini-panisa yoga siddhi yāya thāyasa cvā poyā parvvata je vāsa yāṅā sām̐sa

kalāta khe menā nāma pāravati mhyāca, sakhina sevā yāva thva sundari mhyāca

paraveśa juya dhuno bhumisa vihāra, bhārapase yāṅā-guli juiva vicāra

Translation:

I am the mountain of snow (Himalaya) where female ascetics (yoginī) attain the perfection of yoga and I dwell here and practice prāṇāyāma

My wife is Mena by name, and Parvati is my daughter. Female companions serve this beautiful daughter

I, roaming on the earth/ground, have already entered the stage. One
should carefully deliberate one’s plan (i.e., of Parvati’s marriage to
Shiva).

=== Dark age ===
Being an old lover of your old language, I suffer on seeing it so ill-treated in your hand as an old mother dealt with too roughly by her son.

— Sylvain Lévi in a letter to Dharmaditya Dharmacharya, 1927

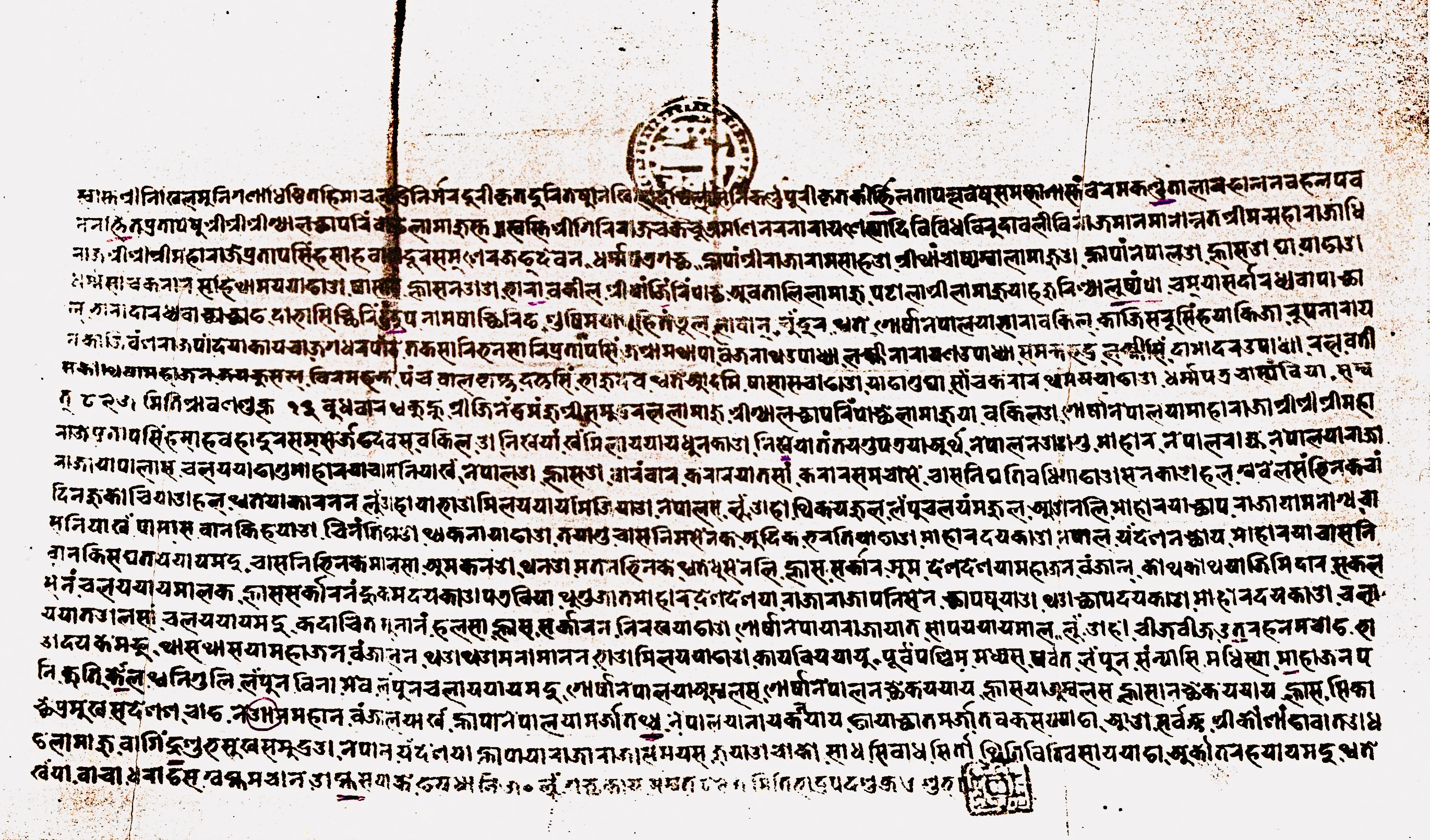
The Nepal-Tibet Treaty of 1775 written in Classical Newar in the Newar script.

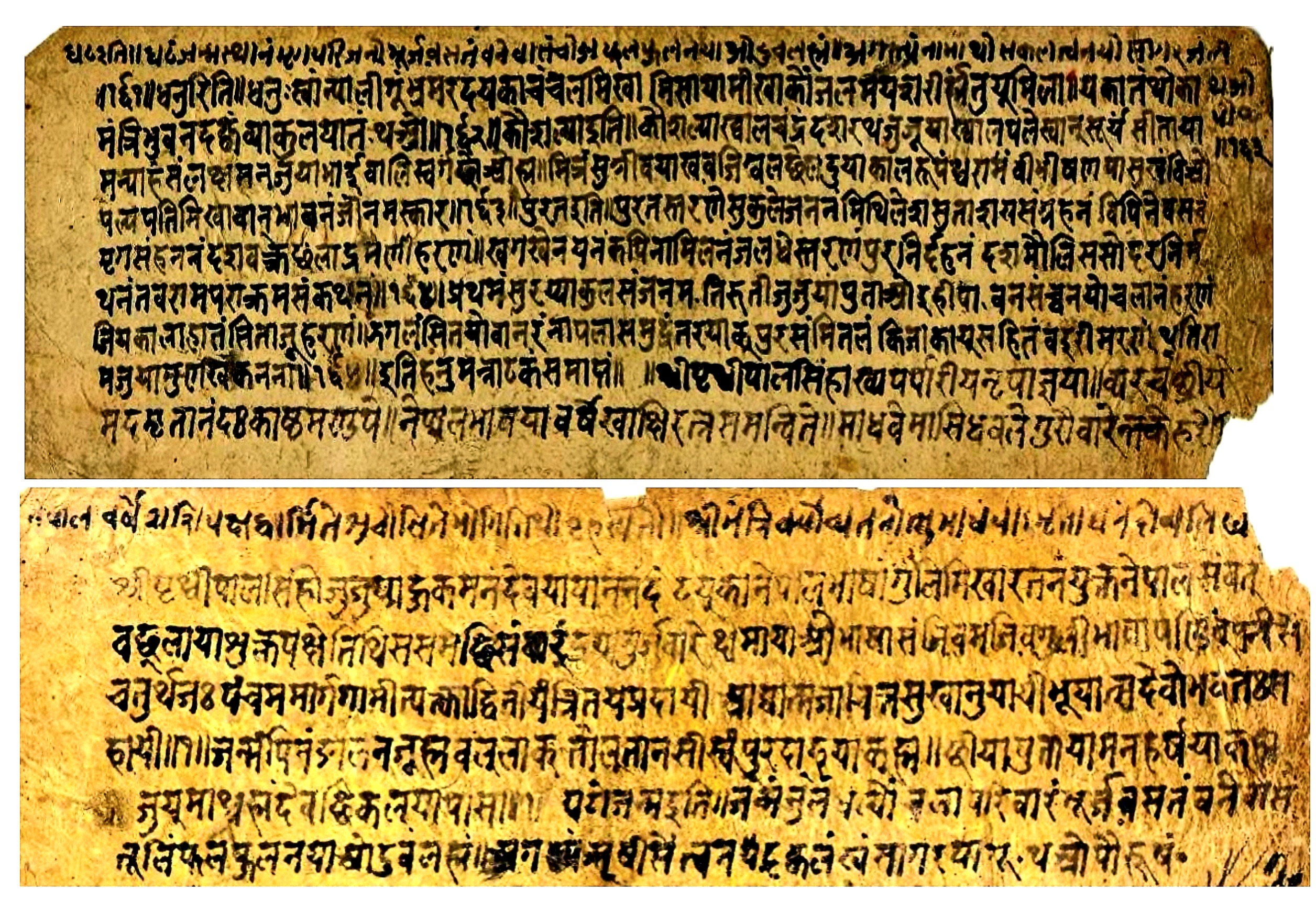
Hanumān Nāṭaka, a Newar-language play written in 1800 CE in the Devanagari script by Amritananda under the commission of King Prithvipal Sen of Palpa.

Newar began to be sidelined after the Gorkha conquest of Nepal and the ouster of the Malla dynasty by the Shah dynasty in the late 18th century. The continuity of the Newar literary tradition was broken by the policies of the Shah government, leading to a sharp diglossia between the spoken and written forms such that the historical written language became largely unintelligible even to educated speakers as the modern language evolved in isolation from its classical literary tradition.

Following the advent of the Shahs, the Gorkhali language became the state language, and Newar was replaced as the language of administration. However, Newar continued to remain in official use for a time as shown by the 1775 treaty with Tibet which was written in it. The early rulers of the Shah dynasty cultivated and patronized the Newar language and literature. Kings Prithvi Narayan Shah, Rana Bahadur Shah, Girvan Yuddha Bikram Shah and Rajendra Bikram Shah composed poetry and wrote plays in it. Similarly, Ranbir Singh Thapa of the Thapa dynasty composed didactic poems in the Newar language.

Newar suffered heavily under the repressive policy of the Rana dynasty (1846–1951) when the regime attempted to wipe it out. Since then, its history has been one of constant suppression and struggle against official disapproval. In 1905, the use of the Newar language in the court, administration, and land registration was declared illegal by the Rana prime minister Chandra Shumsher Rana. Legal documents written in Newar were declared unenforceable, and any evidence in the language was declared null and void. The rulers forbade literature in Newar, and writers were sent to jail. In 1944, Buddhist monks who wrote in the language were expelled from the country. The Nepal Bhasa movement arose as an effort to save the language.

=== Modern Newar ===
==== Nepal Bhasa movement ====
During the time of the repressive Rana regime, Newars struggled to save their language in the face of opposition from the government. The movement arose against the suppression of the language during the Rana regime (1846–1951) and Panchayat system (1960–1990). At those times, the government had forbidden literature in Newar, banned the official use and removed it from the media and the educational system. Activism took the form of publication of books and periodicals to public meets and protest rallies. Many writers and language workers were jailed or expelled from the country, and they continued the movement abroad.

=== Renaissance era ===
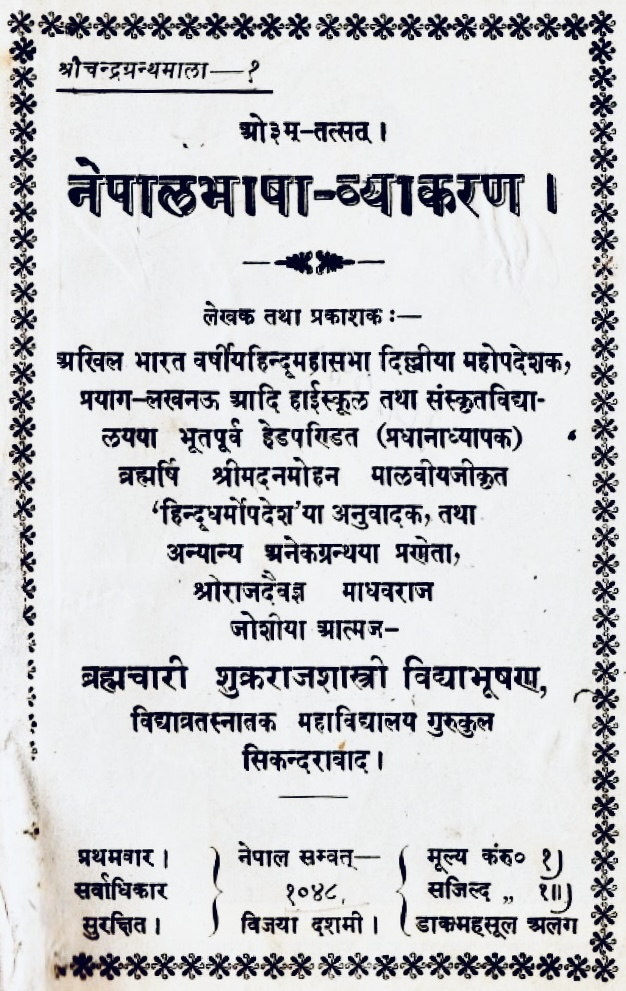
Nepalbhasa Vyakarana (“Grammar of Nepalbhasa”) by Shukraraj Shastri, published in 1928.

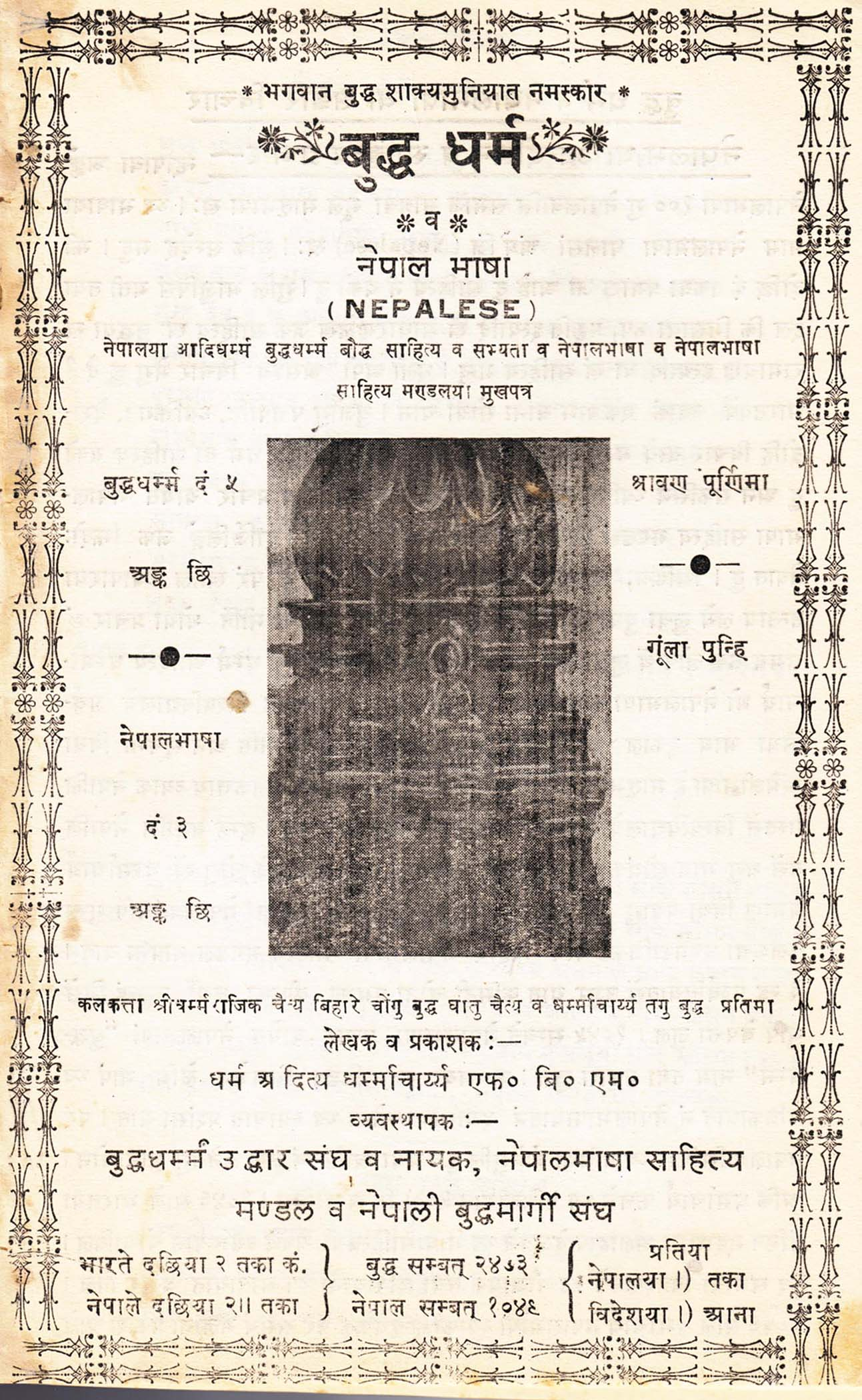
Cover of Buddha Dharma wa Nepal Bhasa ("Buddhism and Nepalese") magazine dated 1929.

The period between 1909 and 1941 is considered as the renaissance era of Newar. During this period, a few authors braved official disapproval and started writing, translating, educating and restructuring the language. Writers Nisthananda Bajracharya, Siddhidas Mahaju, Jagat Sundar Malla and Yogbir Singh Kansakar are honored as the Four Pillars of Nepal Bhasa. Shukraraj Shastri and Dharmaditya Dharmacharya were also at the forefront of the Renaissance.

In 1909, Bajracharya published the first printed book using movable type. Shastri wrote a grammar of the language entitled Nepālabhāṣā Vyākaraṇa the first one in modern times. It was published from Kolkata in 1928. His other works include Nepālabhāṣā Reader, Books 1 and 2 (1933) and an alphabet book Nepālī Varṇamālā (1933). Mahaju's translation of the Ramayan and books on morals and ethics, Malla's endeavors to impart education in the native language and other literary activities marked the renaissance. Dharmacharya published the first magazine in Newar Buddha Dharma wa Nepal Bhasa ("Buddhism and Nepalese") from Kolkata in 1925. During the Renaissance, writers like Shukraraj Shastri started to advocate the name Nepal Bhasa, in place of the term Newar or Newari.

=== Jail years ===
The years 1941–1945 are known as the jail years for the large number of authors who were imprisoned for their literary or political activities. It was a productive period and resulted in an outpouring of literary works. Chittadhar Hridaya, Siddhicharan Shrestha and Phatte Bahadur Singh were among the prominent writers of the period who were jailed for their writings. While in prison, Hridaya produced his greatest work Sugata Saurabha, an epic poem on the life of Gautama Buddha. Shrestha wrote a collection of poems entitled Sisvāṃ ("Wax Flower", published in 1948) among other works. Singh (1902–1983) was sentenced to life imprisonment for editing and publishing an anthology of poems by various poets entitled Nepālī Vihāra.

The efforts of Newar authors coincided with the revival of Arya Samaj and Theravada in Nepal, which the rulers disliked equally. In 1946, the monks who had been exiled by the Ranas in 1944 for teaching Buddhism and writing in Newar were allowed to return following international pressure. Restrictions on publication were relaxed, and books could be published after being censored. The monks wrote wide-ranging books on Buddhism and greatly enriched the corpus of religious literature. Outside the Kathmandu Valley in the 1940s, poets like Ganesh Lal Shrestha of Hetauda composed songs and put on performances during festivals.

=== The 1950s ===
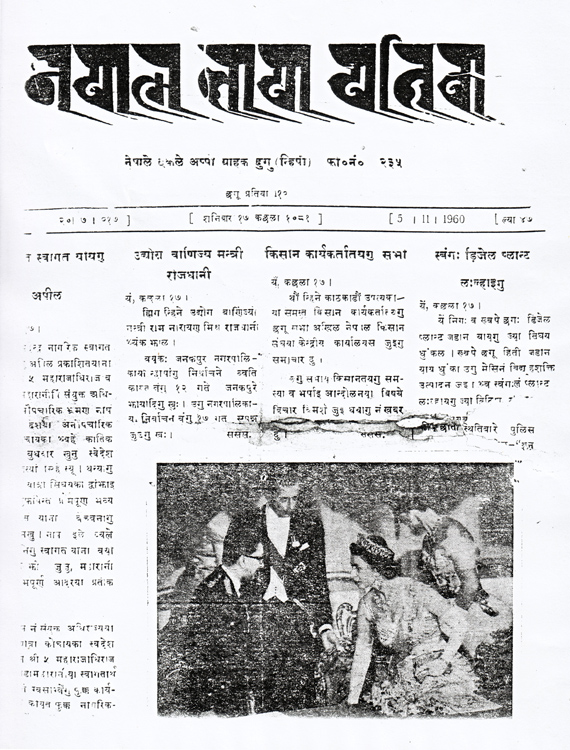
Nepal Bhasa Patrika daily newspaper dated 5 November 1960.

Following the overthrow of the Rana dynasty and the advent of democracy in 1951, restrictions on publication in Newar were removed. Books, magazines and newspapers appeared. A daily newspaper Nepal Bhasa Patrika began publication in 1955. Textbooks were published and Newar was included in the curriculum. Nepal Rastriya Vidhyapitha recognised Newar as an alternative medium of instruction in the schools and colleges affiliated to it. Literary societies like Nepal Bhasa Parisad were formed and Cvasā Pāsā returned from exile. In 1958, Kathmandu Municipality passed a resolution that it would accept applications and publish major decisions in Newar in addition to the Nepali language.

==== Second dark age ====
Democracy lasted for a brief period, and Newar and other languages of Nepal entered a second Dark Age with the dissolution of parliament and the imposition of the Panchayat system in 1960. Under its policy of "one nation, one language", only the Nepali language was promoted, and all the other languages of Nepal were suppressed as "ethnic" or "local" languages.

In 1963, Kathmandu Municipality's decision to recognize Newar was revoked. In 1965, the language was also banned from being broadcast over Radio Nepal. Those who protested against the ban were put in prison, including Buddhist monk Sudarshan Mahasthavir. The New Education System Plan brought out in 1971 eased out Nepal's other languages from the schools in a bid to diminish the country's multi-lingual traditions. Students were discouraged from choosing their native language as an elective subject because it was lumped with technical subjects. Moreover, hostility towards the language from neighbors grew following massive migration into the Kathmandu Valley leading to the indigenous Newars becoming a minority. During the period 1952 to 1991, the percentage of the valley population speaking Newar dropped from 74.95% to 43.93%.

Nepal's various languages began to stagnate as the population could not use them for official, educational, employment or legal purposes. Birat Nepal Bhasa Sahitya Sammelan Guthi (Grand Nepal Bhasa Literary Conference Trust), formed in 1962 in Bhaktapur, and Nepal Bhasa Manka Khala, founded in 1979 in Kathmandu, are some of the prominent organizations that emerged during this period to struggle for language rights. The names of these organizations also annoyed the government which, on one occasion in 1979, changed the name of Brihat Nepal Bhasa Sahitya Sammelan Guthi in official media reports.

==== Post-1990 People's Movement ====
After the 1990 People's Movement that brought the Panchayat system to an end, the languages of Nepal enjoyed greater freedom. The 1990 constitution recognized Nepal as a multiethnic and multilingual country. The Nepali language in the Devanagari script was declared the language of the nation and the official language. Meanwhile, all the languages spoken as native languages in Nepal were named national languages. In 1997, Kathmandu Metropolitan City declared that its policy to officially recognize Nepal Bhasa would be revived. The rest of the city governments in the Kathmandu Valley announced that they too would recognize it. However, critics petitioned the Supreme Court to have the policy annulled, and in 1999, the Supreme Court quashed the decision of the local bodies as being unconstitutional.

==== Post-2006 People's Movement ====
A second People's Movement in 2006 ousted the Shah dynasty and Nepal became a republic which gave the people greater linguistic freedom. Since then, the number of schools teaching Newar increased, and Newar is also being offered in schools outside the Kathmandu Valley. The 2007 Interim Constitution states that the use of one's native language in a local body or office shall not be barred. However, this has not happened in practice. Organizations with names in Newar are not registered, and municipality officials refuse to accept applications written in the language.

=== Outside Nepal Mandala ===
Inscriptions written in Newar are found across Nepal Mandala and outside. In Gorkha, the Bhairav Temple at Pokharithok Bazaar contains an inscription dated Nepal Sambat 704 (1584 CE), which is 185 years before the conquest of the Kathmandu Valley by the Gorkha Kingdom. The Palanchowk Bhagawati Temple situated to the east of Kathmandu contains an inscription recording a land donation dated Nepal Sambat 861 (1741 CE). In Bhojpur in east Nepal, an inscription at the Bidyadhari Ajima Temple dated Nepal Sambat 1011 (1891 CE) records the donation of a door and tympanum. The Bindhyabasini Temple in Bandipur in west Nepal contains an inscription dated Nepal Sambat 950 (1830 CE) about the donation of a tympanum.

Outside Nepal, Newar has been used in Tibet and India. In Kashi, an inscription of Queen Ganga Rani, the mother of Trailokya Malla, is written in Newar language alongside Sanskrit and is dated to 1572 CE (NS 692). Similarly, official documents and inscriptions recording votive offerings made by Newar traders have been found in Lhasa. A copper plate dated Nepal Sambat 781 (1661 CE) recording the donation of a tympanum is installed at the shrine of Chhwaskamini Ajima (Tibetan: Palden Lhamo) in the Jokhang Temple.

== Geographic distribution ==
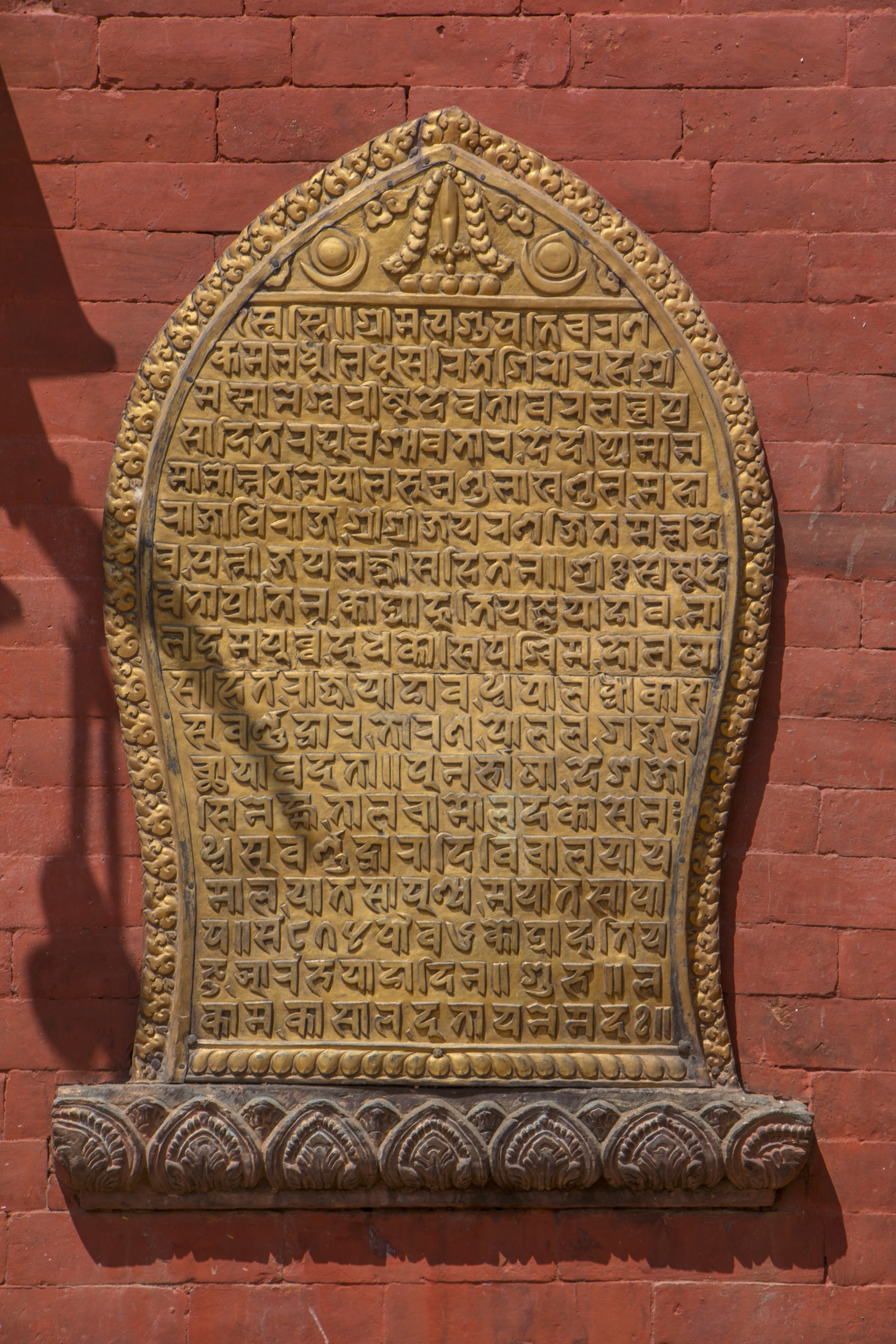
An inscription in Classical Newar from Bhaktapur Durbar Square.

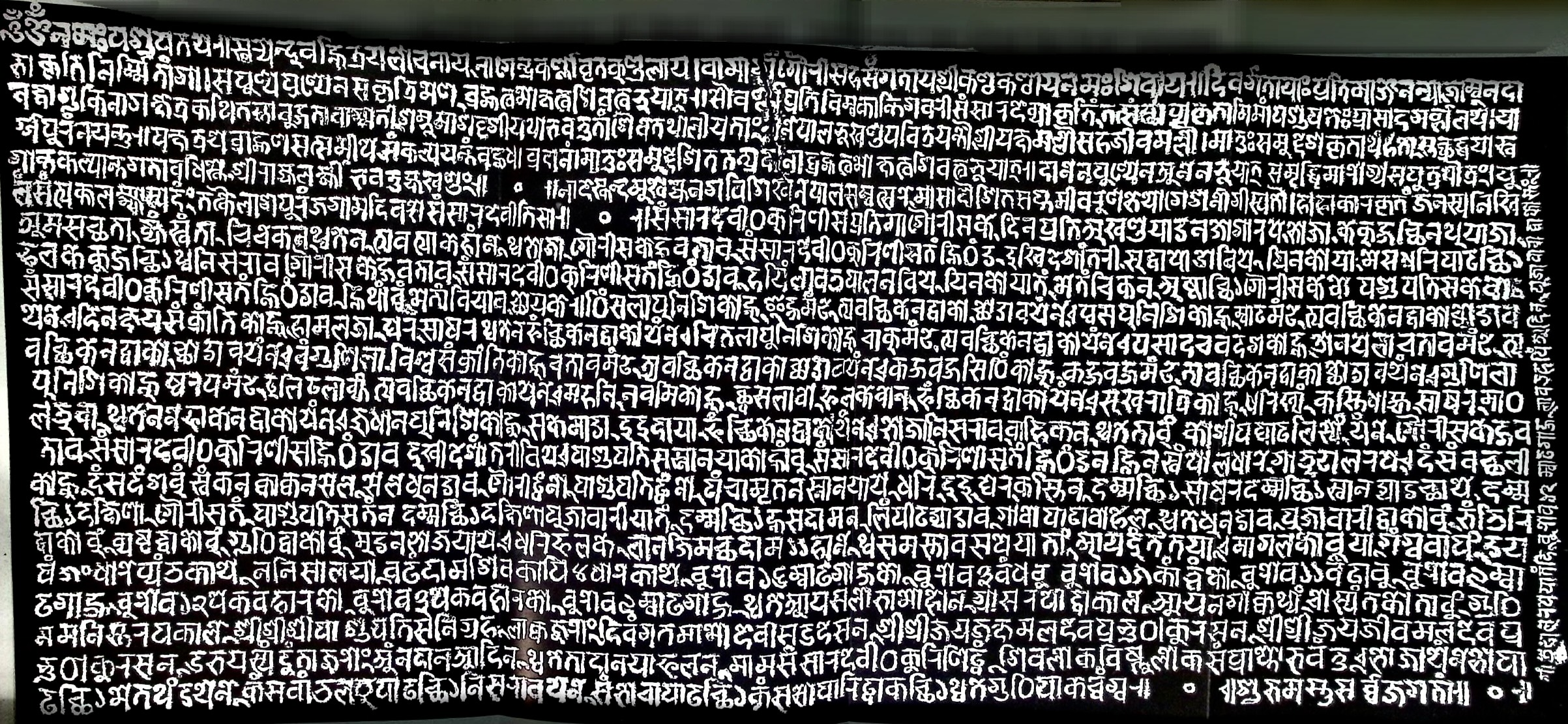
King Yaksha Malla’s copperplate inscription in Newar language, 1446 CE.

Newar is spoken by over 800,000 people in Nepal according to the 2021 census.

- In Nepal: Kathmandu Valley (including Kathmandu, Lalitpur, Bhaktapur and Madhyapur Thimi municipalities), Dolakha District, Banepa, Dhulikhel, Bandipur, Bhimphedi (Makwanpur), Panauti, Palpa, Trishuli, Nuwakot, Bhojpur, Chitlang, Narayangarh, Chitwan.
- In India: West Bengal & Sikkim
- In Bhutan: Southern Bhutan

== Official status ==
=== Nepal ===
Newar was Nepal Mandala's (then only known as Nepal) lingua franca and official language during the Malla dynasty. The continued official use of Newari into the Shah dynasty is shown by the 1775 treaty with Tibet, which was written in the language, but it was gradually replaced in official use by Gorkhali. From the early 20th century until democratization, Newar suffered from official suppression. During this period, the use of the language for business and literary purposes was declared illegal, and Newar authors were fined or imprisoned.

The Language Commission of Nepal recommended Bagmati Province to provide Nepal Bhasa (Newar) the status of official language, alongside Tamang. The commission also recommends Nepal Bhasa (Newar) for official status in specific areas and purposes in Koshi Province and Gandaki Province. At local levels, Nepal Bhasa (Newar) has official status in Kathmandu Metropolitan City, Lalitpur Metropolitan City and Kirtipur Municipality Chandragiri Municipality, Shankharapur Municipality, Tarkeshwor Municipality of Kathmandu district; Banepa Municipality, Dhulikhel Municipality of Kavre district; Godavari Municipality of Lalitpur district; and Bhaktapur Municipality, Madhyapur Thimi Municipality of Bhaktapur district have recognized Nepal Bhasa in some ways. Similarly, Bhimeshor Municipality has recognized and made policy-level decisions for Dolakha Nepal Bhasa.

=== India ===
Newar is an additional official language in Sikkim for the purpose of preservation of culture and tradition in the state. The official weekly publication Sikkim Herald has a Newar Edition. The Information & Public Relations Department also broadcasts news bulletin in Newar.

== Education ==
Nepal Bhasa is included as elective mother tongue subject in schools by Curriculum Development Committee. Tribhuvan University offers Bachelors, Masters, Mphil and PhD degree in Nepal Bhasa. Nepal Bhasa is also offered at Bishwa Bhasa Campus in Kathmandu. Kathmandu Metropolitan City and Kirtipur Municipality are teaching Nepal Bhasa as a local language. Newar is taught in schools of Sikkim.

== Classification ==
The exact placement of Newar within the Tibeto-Burman language family has been a source of controversies and confusion. Robert Shafer classified Newar as part of his Bodic division of Sino-Tibetan. George Van Driem classified Newar within the Mahakiranti grouping but he later retracted his hypothesis in 2003. Moreover, he proposed a new grouping called "Maha-Newari" which possibly includes Baram–Thangmi.

T. R. Kansakar attributes the difficulty about the placement of Newar to the inability of scholars to connect it with the migration patterns of the Tibeto-Burman speakers. Since Newar separated from rest of the family very early in history, it is difficult or at least arbitrary to reconstruct the basic stratum that contributed to present day Newar speech. He underscored the point that the language evolved from mixed racial/linguistic influences that do not lend easily to a neat classification.

Glover's classification indicating a percentage of shared vocabulary within the labeled branch and an approximate time of split:

- Sino-Tibetan
  - Non Bodic divisions, e.g. Karen etc.
  - Bodic Division (13%, 5000BC)ɫ
    - East Himalayish Subdivision, e.g. Sunwar
    - Bodic Subdivision (19%, 3200BC)
      - Bodish Section: Tamang, Manang, Gurung, Thakali, Kaike, Tibetan, Sherpa
      - Kiranti Section, e.g. Limbu
      - West Central Himalayish Section ɞ (28%, 2200BC)
        - Chepang
        - Maha Newari ʌ
          - Baram–Thangmi
          - Pahari Newar
          - Dolakha Newar
          - Modern Newar

ɫ "%" indicates lexical similarity/common vocabulary between Newar and the other languages in the branch. The date indicates an approximate time when the language diverged.
ɞ Van Driem labelled this branch as "Parakiranti" and included it together with Kiranti branch to form Maha Kiranti group. However, he would later drop this hypothesis.
ʌ All languages within this branch have extensive Indo-Aryan vocabulary. It is hypothesized that either ancient Indo-Aryan admixture happened before Newar-Thangmi-Baram split or that Thangmi-Baram borrowed through Newari.

== Literature ==
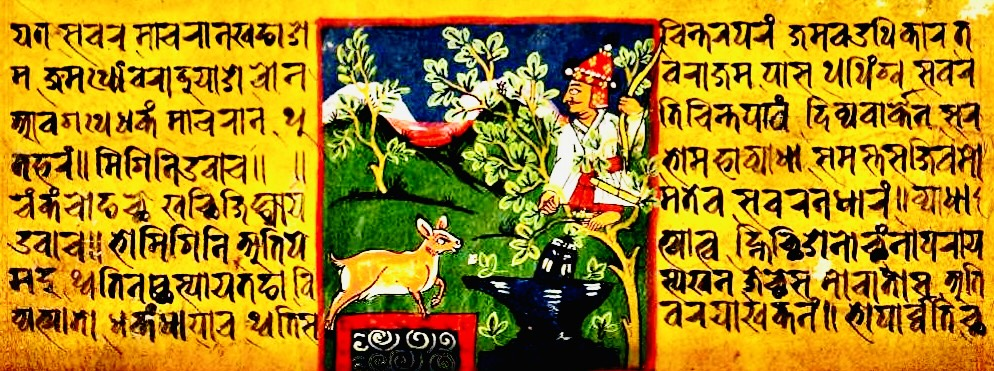
A folio from Śivarātri Bākhan, a Newar story book from 1705 CE.

ka kha yā mye("a song of ka and kha"), a poem written in the Newar script by Briddhi Lakhmi.

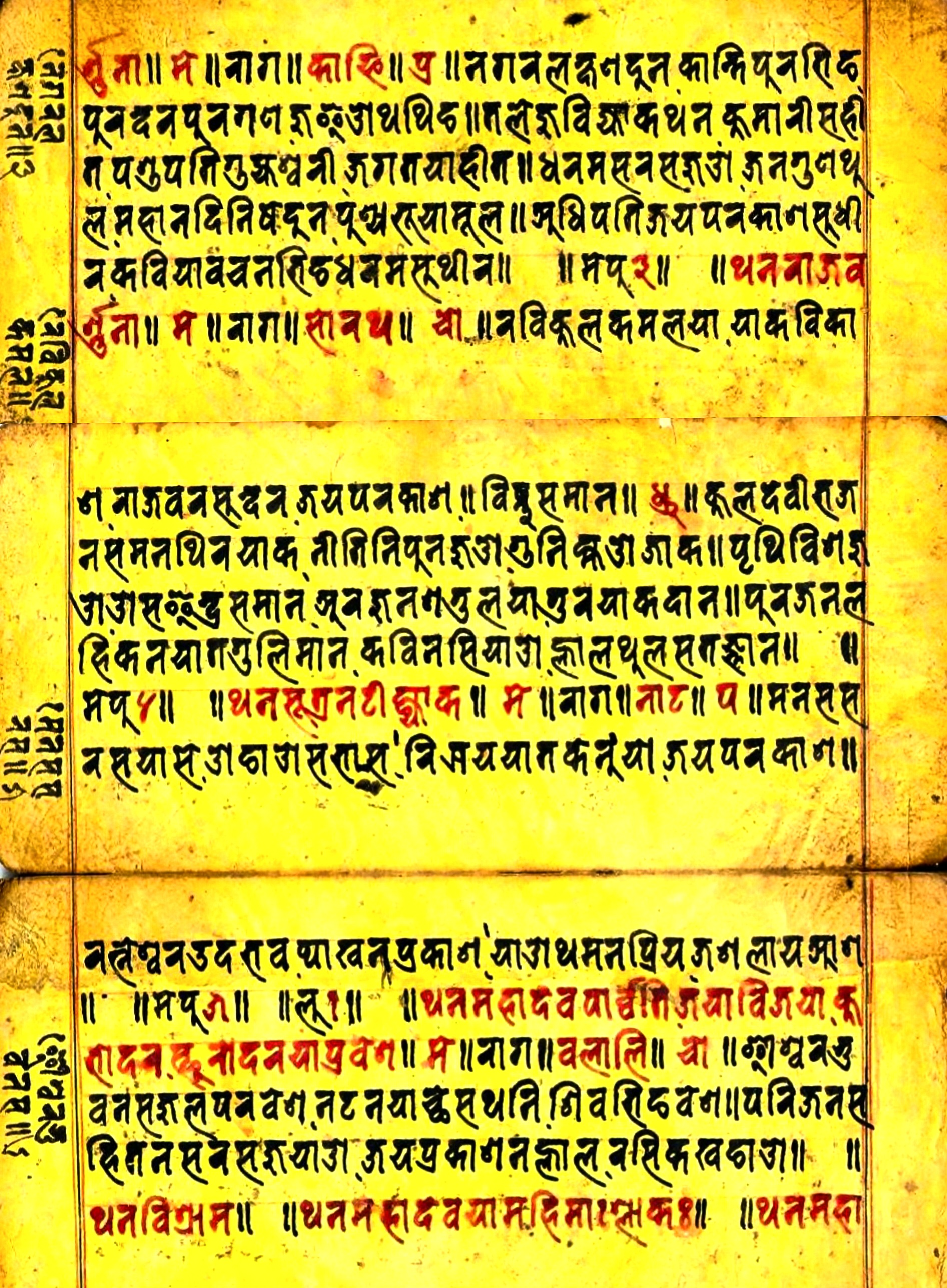
A manuscript of Ratneśvara-prādurbhāva Pyākhan, a Newar play written by Jaya Prakash Malla.

Newar literature comprises those literary texts written in Newar language. Among the Sino-Tibetan languages spoken in India, Newar along with Manipuri language, has early documented literatures. The most prevalent literary genres in the Newar language includes dramas, poetry, and story.

=== Drama ===
Most of the dramas composed in Newar are based on religious tales. These dramas are traditionally performed in open stage. Most of them are narrated with the help of songs sung at intervals and dialogues. The Kārtika Pyākhan is considered one of the "living drama" in the Newar language, as it has been performed since its inception in 1641 CE in every year. The first drama in Newar is Ekādaśīvrata, written by king Siddhinarasimha Malla in the 1633 CE. The prominent playwrights in Newar includes Srinivasa Malla, Yoga Narendra Malla, Ranajit Malla, and Jaya Prakash Malla.

=== Poetry ===
Poetry writing constituted a splendid part of medieval Malla aristocracy. Many of the kings were well-renowned poets. Mahendra Malla is the first poet (Ādikavi) of Newar language. His poem Kapaṭi māyānaṃ kenyā he Rāma is considered the first poem written in Newar. One notable poet who wrote many poems was Jagat Prakasha Malla, who composed a collection of 519-poems called Nepālabhāṣāyā Gita. Similarly, Siddhi Narasimha Malla composed a 31-poem collection called Gopināthyā Gita.

=== Story ===
The art of storytelling is very old in Newar. This includes stories like Dhon Cholecha, Svasthāni Bākhan, and Puranas. The oldest storybook in Newar is Bhāgavata Purāṇa dated 1505 CE.

== Dialects ==
Linguist Balkrishna Pokharel in 1998, classifies 6 main dialects of Newar:

- Kathmandu
- Bhaktapur
- Banepa
- Dolakha
- Chitlang
- Pahari

Shakya (1989) and Joshi (2003), recognizes 5 main dialects of Newar and Joshi further classifies their subdialects.

- Kathmandu-Lalitpur dialect, also known as Yeṃ-Yala Bhāy, is one of the dominant forms of the language and the standard form of the language used in academia and media. It is widely spoken in Kathmandu and Lalitpur. Due to the similarity between Kathmandu and Lalitpur Newar, it is often grouped as one.
- Bhaktapur, also known as Khvapa Bhāy, is spoken in Bhaktapur district. The Bhaktapur dialect is also the most widely spoken dialect outside the Kathmandu Valley. Various subdialects of this dialect include, Banepa, Panauti, Dhulikhel, Bandipur, Palpa, Gorkha, Baglung, Parvat, and Sindhupalchok.
- Dolakha, known as Dvālkhā Bhāy, is spoken in Dolakha district. It has 3 subdialect which are Tauthali, Listi and Duti.
- Chitlang is used in Chitlang, a place south of Kathmandu valley in Makwanpur district. It has 2 subdialects, Balami and Gamal.
- Pahari is spoken among the Pahari or Nagarkoti caste.

Kansakar (2011) recognizes three main Newar dialect clusters.

- Western: Tansen (Palpa), Butwal, Nepalgunj, Old Pokhara, Dumre, Bandipur, Ridhi (Gulmi), Baglung, Dotili / Silgadi
- Central: Kathmandu, Lalitpur, Bhaktapur, Thimi, Kirtipur, Chitlang, Lele, Balaju, Tokha, Pharping, Thankot, Dadikot, Balami, Gopali, Bungamati, Badegaon, Pyangaon, Chapagaon, Lubhu, Sankhu, Chakhunti, Gamtsa Gorkha, Badikhel (Pahari), Kavrepalanchok District dialects (Banepa, Nala, Sangaa, Chaukot, Panauti, Dhulikhel, Duti), Khampu, Khopasi
- Eastern: Chainpur, Dharan, Dolakha, Sindhupalchok, Taplejung, Terhathum, Bhojpur, Dhankuta, Narayangadh, Jhapa, Ilam

Kansakar (2011) also gives the following classification of Newar dialects based on verb conjugation morphology.

- Central
  - Kathmandu, Lalitpur, Kirtipur, Chitlang, Lele
  - Bhaktapur, Thimi
- Eastern
  - Dolakha, Tauthali, Jethal, Listikot, Doti
  - Pahari (Badikhel)

== Phonology ==
=== Consonants ===
		Labial	Dental/ Alveolar	Retroflex	(Alveolo-) palatal	Velar	Glottal
Nasal	voiced	m	n			ŋ	
Nasal	murmured	mʱ^{1}	nʱ^{1}				
Stop/ Affricate	voiceless	p	t	ʈ^{2}	tɕ	k	
Stop/ Affricate	aspirated	pʰ	tʰ	ʈʰ^{2}	tɕʰ	kʰ	
Stop/ Affricate	voiced	b	d	ɖ^{2}	dʑ	ɡ	
Stop/ Affricate	murmured	bʱ	dʱ	ɖʱ^{2}	dʑʱ	ɡʱ	
Fricative			s				h
Tap	voiced		(ɾ)	[ɽ]^{2}			
Tap	murmured		[ɾʱ]^{2}	[ɽʱ]^{2}			
Approximant	voiced	w	l		j		
Approximant	murmured	wʱ^{1}	lʱ^{1}		jʱ^{1}		

1. Only in Kathmandu Newar.
2. Only in Dolakha Newar.

Notes

- Marginal phonemes are in parentheses.
- Allophonic variants are in Square brackets.
- Tap consonants mainly occur as word-medial alternates of /t/, /d/, /dʱ/ or /ɖ/ (in Dolakha only).
- /s/ can be heard as [ɕ] when occurring before front vowels/glide /i, e, j/.
- In Kathmandu Newar, /ŋ/ only occurs as word-final.
- Affricates /tɕ, dʑ/ can also shift to retracted sounds [t̠s̠, d̠z̠] when occurring before back vowels.

=== Vowels ===
	Front			Central			Back		
	short	long	nasal	short	long	nasal	short	long	nasal
Close	i	iː	ĩ				u	uː	ũ
Close-mid	e	eː	ẽ				o	oː	õ
Mid				(ə)	(əː)	(ə̃)	ɔ~ɑ	ɔː~ɑː	ɔ̃~ɑ̃
Open-mid		ɛː^{1}	ɛ̃^{1}				ɔ~ɑ	ɔː~ɑː	ɔ̃~ɑ̃
Open		æː^{1}	æ̃^{1}	a	aː	ã	ɔ~ɑ	ɔː~ɑː	ɔ̃~ɑ̃

1. Only in Kathmandu Newar.
- In Kathmandu Newar, the back vowel sounds /ɔ~ɑ/ occur as [ɔ], [ə], or [ɑ].
- In Dolakha Newar, the back vowel sounds /ɔ~ɑ/, can occur [ɑ], [ʌ], or [ə].
- /o, oː/ and /u/ can also be heard as [ɔ, ɔː], and [ʊ].
- The following nasal vowels can also be distinguished in vowel length as /ĩː ẽː ɔ̃ː ãː õː ũː/.

==== Diphthongs ====
		Front		Central		Back	
		oral	nasal	oral	nasal	oral	nasal
Diphthong	Close	ui	uĩ				
Diphthong	Mid	ei	eĩ	ɔi	ɔĩ	ɔu	ɔũ
Diphthong	Open			ai	aĩ	au	aũ

== Writing systems ==
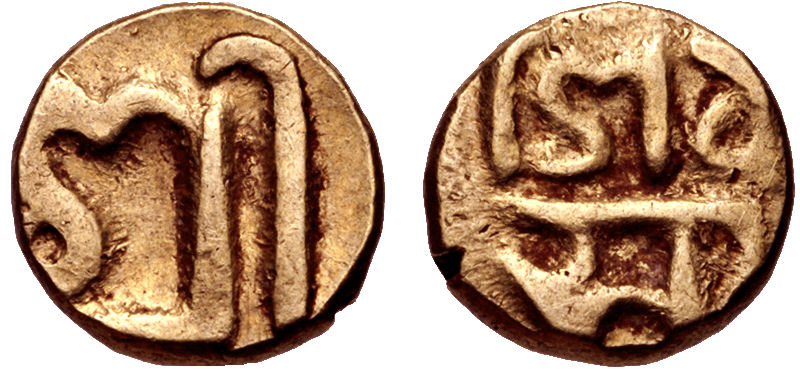
Newar script on the coin of King Shivadeva III (c. 1098-1126 CE).

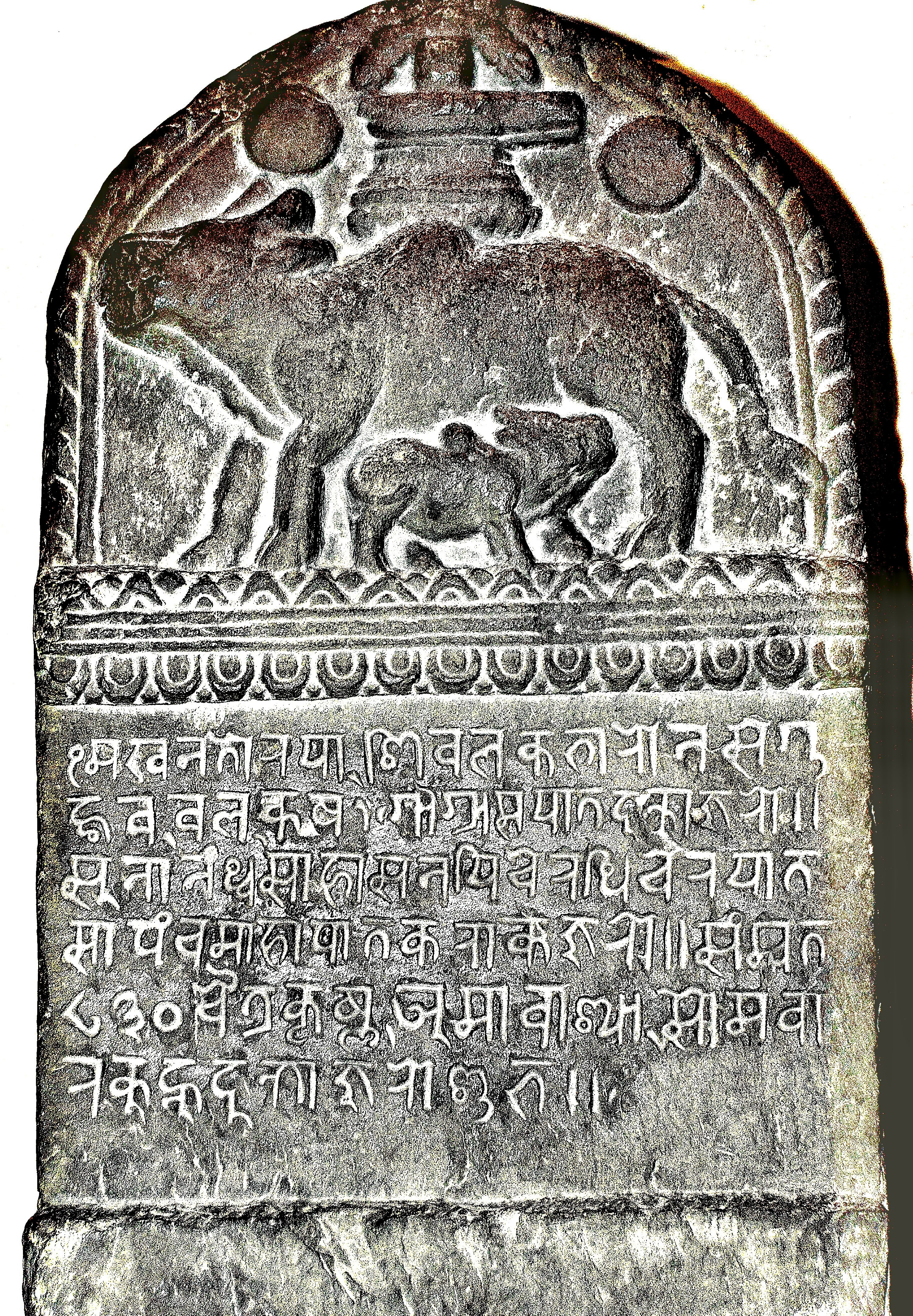
A Classical Newar inscription, written in the Newar script.

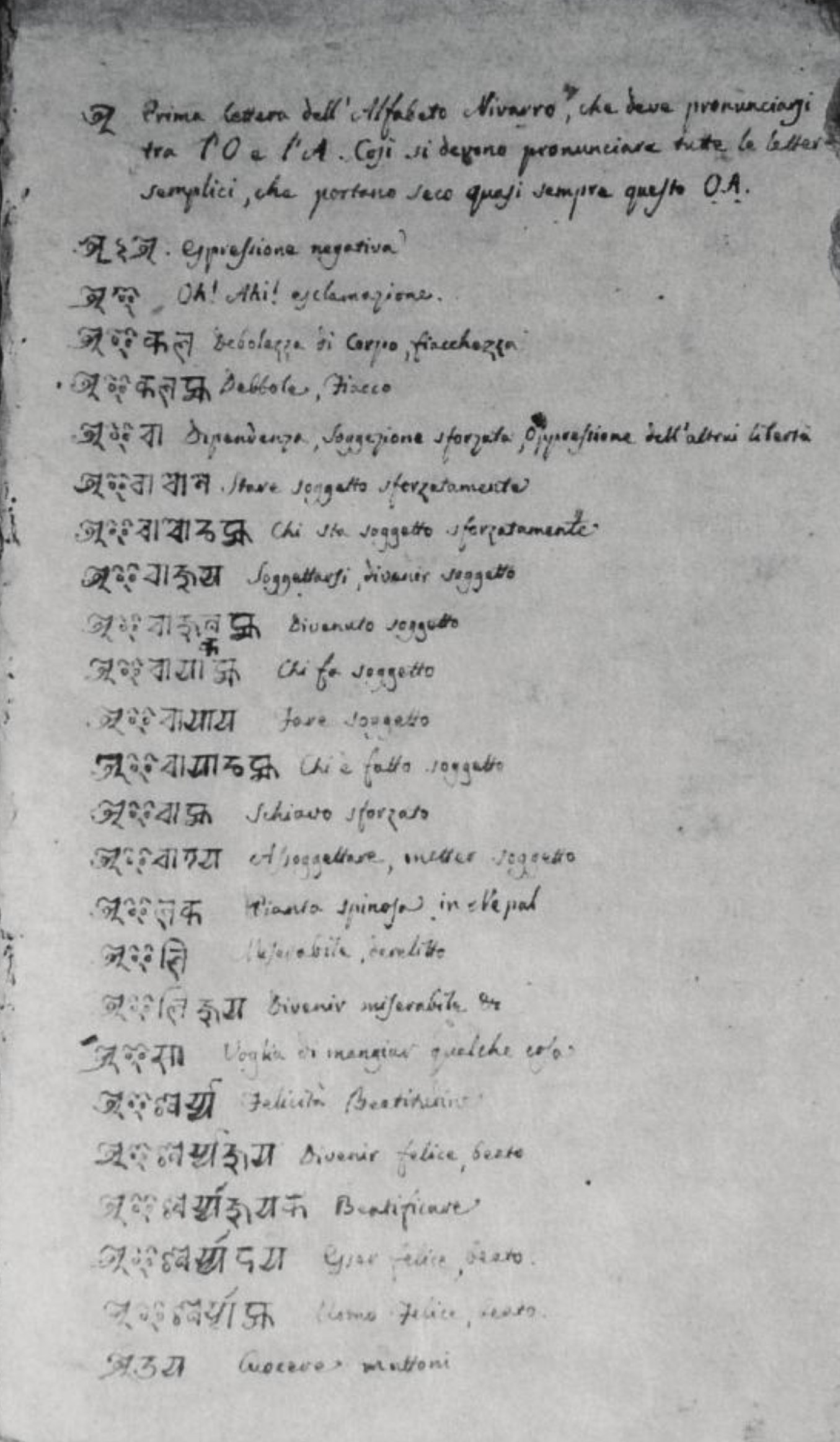
Newar-Italian dictionary compiled by the Capuchin friar John Gaulbert da Massa in 1762.
The dictionary begins with: 𑐀 Prima lettera dell’alfabeto Nivarro...
[ 𑐀 First letter of the Newar alphabet...]

Nepal Bhasa is generally written in Newar script, Bhujimol script, Ranjana script and Devanagari script. Newar script, also known as Nepal Lipi, emerged in the 10th century. Over the centuries, a number of variants of Nepalese scripts emerged from the Newar script, which are:

- Kunmol script
- Kwenmol script
- Litumol script
- Hinmol script
- Golmol script
- Pachumol script

The Nepalese scripts, fell into disuse at the beginning of the 20th century when writing in the language and the script was banned, which resulted in emergence of Devanagari script. In the past decade attempts are being made to revive the various Nepalese scripts, and it is experiencing a revival due to the recent rise of cultural awareness.

=== Newar alphabet ===
==== Vowels ====
The vowels, called mā ākhala (𑐩𑐵𑐁𑐏𑐮), meaning "mother letters", used in Newar are:

Vowels	Diacritics	IPA	With 𑐎 (ka)	With 𑐐 (ga)
𑐀	—	/ə/	𑐎	𑐐
𑐁	𑐵	/aː/	𑐎𑐵	𑐐𑐵
𑐂	𑐶	/i/	𑐎𑐶	𑐐𑐶
𑐃	𑐷	/iː/	𑐎𑐷	𑐐𑐷
𑐄	𑐸	/u/	𑐎𑐸	𑐐𑐸
𑐅	𑐹	/uː/	𑐎𑐹	𑐐𑐹
𑐆	𑐺	/r̩/	𑐎𑐺	𑐐𑐺
𑐇	𑐻	/r̩ː/	𑐎𑐻	𑐐𑐻
𑐈	𑐼	/l̩/	𑐎𑐼	𑐐𑐼
𑐉	𑐽	/l̩ː/	𑐎𑐽	𑐐𑐽
𑐊	𑐾	/eː/	𑐎𑐾	𑐐𑐾
𑐋	𑐿	/ai̯/	𑐎𑐿	𑐐𑐿
𑐌	𑑀	/oː/	𑐎𑑀	𑐐𑑀
𑐍	𑑁	/au̯/	𑐎𑑁	𑐐𑑁
𑐀𑑄	𑑄	/ə̃/	𑐎𑑄	𑐐𑑄
𑐀𑑅	𑑅	/əː/	𑐎𑑅	𑐐𑑅

Even though 𑐆, 𑐇, 𑐈, 𑐉 are present in Newar, they are mainly used in the loanwords. Some grammarians like Maharjan, suggest including 𑐀𑐫𑑂 (ay) and 𑐁𑐫𑑂 (aay) in the list of vowels. The appearance of vowel diacritics changes depending on whether the consonant has a top line or not. There are seven consonants without top lines: 𑐐 (gə), 𑐘 (ɲə), 𑐛 (ʈʰə), 𑐞 (ɳə), 𑐠 (tʰə), 𑐢 (dʰə), and 𑐱 (ʃə).

==== Consonants ====
The consonants, are called bā ākhala (𑐧𑐵𑐁𑐏𑐮), meaning "father letters", used in Newar are:

𑐎	𑐏	𑐐	𑐑	𑐒	𑐓
/kə/	/kʰə/	/ɡə/	/ɡʱə/	/ŋə/	/ŋʱa/
𑐔	𑐕	𑐖	𑐗	𑐘	𑐙
/t͡ɕə/	/t͡ɕʰə/	/d͡ʑə/	/d͡ʑʱə/	/ɲə/	/ɲʱa/
𑐚	𑐛	𑐜	𑐝	𑐞	𑐴𑑂𑐞
/ʈə/	/ʈʰə/	/ɖə/	/ɖʱə/	/ɳə/	/ɳʱa/
𑐟	𑐠	𑐡	𑐢	𑐣	𑐤
/tə/	/tʰə/	/də/	/dʱə/	/nə/	/nʱa/
𑐥	𑐦	𑐧	𑐨	𑐩	𑐪
/pə/	/pʰə/	/bə/	/bʱə/	/mə/	/mʱa/
𑐫	𑐬	𑐭	𑐮	𑐯	𑐰
/jə/	/rə/	/rʱa/	/lə/	/lʱa/	/ʋə/
𑐱	𑐲	𑐳	𑐴		
/ʃə/	/ʂə/	/sə/	/hə/		
𑐎𑑂𑐲	𑐟𑑂𑐬	𑐖𑑂𑐘			
/kʂə/	/t̪rə/	/d͡ʑɲə/			

==== Numerals ====
𑑐	𑑑	𑑒	𑑓	𑑔	𑑕	𑑖	𑑗	𑑘	𑑙
0	1	2	3	4	5	6	7	8	9

=== Ranjana alphabet ===
==== Vowels ====
a अ	ā आ	i इ	ī ई	u उ	ū ऊ	ṛ ऋ	ṝ ॠ
ḷ ऌ	ḹ ॡ	e ए	ai ऐ	o ओ	au औ	aṃ अं	aḥ अः

==== Consonants ====
k क	kʰ ख	g ग	gʱ घ	ŋ ङ
t͡ɕ च	t͡ɕʰ छ	d͡ʑ ज	d͡ʑʱ झ	ɲ ञ
ʈ ट	ʈʰ ठ	ɖ ड	ɖʱ ढ	ɳ ण
t त	tʰ थ	d द	dʱ ध	n न
p प	pʰ फ	b ब	bʱ भ	m म
y य	r र	l ल	w व	
ɕ श	ʂ ष	s̪ स	h ह	

kʂ क्ष	t̪r त्र	d͡ʑɲ ज्ञ

==== Numerals ====
- The numerals used in Ranjana script are as follows (from 0 to 9):

0	1	2	3	4	5	6	7	8	9

== Grammar ==
=== Noun cases ===
Newar has six cases and they are differentiated based on whether the term in question is animate or inanimate. The following charts provide case endings that can be affixed on the end of nouns, pronouns, and adjectives in IAST transliteration for contemporary and old (or "classical") Newar.

Noun Case Endings in Contemporary Newar
	Inanimate	Animate/non-honorific		Animate/honorific	
Case	Singular	Singular	Plural	Singular	Plural
Instrumental/Ergative	-ṃ, -ḥṃ	-ṃ, -ḥṃ	(-sa-) -ṃ, -ḥṃ,	-ṃ, -ḥṃ	-pisaṃ, -pisaḥṃ
Absolutive	-ø	-ø	-ta	-ø	-pīṃ
Sociative	X	-yāke, -ike	-tayke	-yāke, -ike	-pīṃke
Dative	-yāta	-yāta, -ta	-tayta, -ita	-yāta	-pīṃta
Genitive	-yā	-yā	-tay	-yā	-pini
Locative	-e, -ay, -ī	X	X	X	X

Noun Case Endings in Classical Newar
	Inanimate	Animate/non-honorific		Animate/honorific	
Case	Singular	Singular	Plural	Singular	Plural
Instrumental/Ergative	-n	-n	-taseṃ	-n, -seṃ	-paniseṃ
Absolutive	-ø	-ø	-ta, -to	-ø	-pani
Sociative	-va	-va	-mis(a)va	-va	-panis(a)va
Dative	-taṃ, -yātā	-taṃ, -yātaṃ	-mistaṃ	-yātaṃ	-panistaṃ
Genitive	-yā	-yā	-tas, -mis	-yā	-panis
Locative	-s	-(s)ke, -yāke	X	-(s)ke, -yāke	-paniske

=== Honorifics ===
Newar has politeness levels and honorifics that change depending on the people's status and age. These are in three levels:

1. Ordinary: Used with close family members, friends and people younger than the speaker.
2. Honorific: Used in formal situations; when speaking with distant family members, teachers, elders and unknown people.
3. High honorific: Used for gods and goddesses, when speaking with priests, and by priestly castes (Rajopadhyaya and Vajracharya) when speaking among themselves. It was also used for royal register during the Malla period.

Honorifics are used in Newar through pronominal forms and verbal morphology. The pronouns for ordinary, honorific, and high honorific levels are shown side by side in the table below:

Person	Singular			Plural		
Person	Ordinary	Honorific	High Honorific	Ordinary	Honorific	High Honorific
First-person	𑐖𑐶 ji [d͡ʑi]			𑐗𑐷 ^{†} jhī [d͡ʑʱiː] 𑐖𑐶𑐥𑐶𑑄^{‡} jipiṃ [d͡ʑipĩ]		
Second-person	𑐕 cha [t͡ɕʰə]	𑐕𑐶 chi [t͡ɕʰi]	𑐕𑐮𑐥𑑀𑐮 chalapola [t͡ɕʰələpolə]	𑐕𑐶𑐥𑐶𑑄 chipiṃ [t͡ɕʰipĩ]	𑐕𑐶𑐎𑐥𑐶𑑄 chikapiṃ [t͡ɕʰikapĩ]	𑐕𑐮𑐥𑑀𑐮𑐥𑐶𑑄 chalapolapiṃ [t͡ɕʰələpoləpĩ]
Third-person	𑐰 va [wə]	𑐰𑐫𑑂‌𑐎 veka [wɛkə]	𑐰𑐳𑐥𑑀𑐮 vasapola [wəsəpolə]	𑐂𑐥𑐶𑑄 ipiṃ [ipĩ]	𑐰𑐫𑑂‌𑐎𑐥𑐶𑑄 vekapiṃ [wɛkəpĩ]	𑐰𑐳𑐥𑑀𑐮𑐥𑐶𑑄 vasapolapiṃ [wəsəpoləpĩ]

^{†} The inclusive form of "we".
^{‡} The exclusive form of "we".

Newar has a unique vocabulary of verbs for honorifics, although most of time suffix -disam̐ or -bijyāhum̐ are added to the verbs for honorific and high honorific forms. Below are some examples of the imperative verbs used in Newar:

Imperative Verbs	Ordinary	Honorific	High Honorific
come	𑐰𑐵 vā	𑐗𑐵𑐳𑑄𑑃 jhāsam̐	𑐧𑐶𑐖𑑂𑐫𑐵𑐴𑐸𑑃 bijyāhum̐
sleep	𑐡𑑂𑐫𑑃 dyam̐	𑐢𑑃𑐡𑐶𑐳𑑃 dham̐disam̐	𑐢𑑃𑐧𑐶𑐖𑑂𑐫𑐵𑐴𑐸𑑃 dham̐bijyāhum̐
eat	𑐣 na	𑐨𑐥𑐶𑐫𑐵𑐡𑐶𑐳𑑃 bhapiyādisam̐	𑐨𑐥𑐶𑐫𑐵𑐧𑐶𑐖𑑂𑐫𑐵𑐴𑐸𑑃 bhapiyābijyāhum̐
tell/say	𑐢𑐵 dhā	𑐢𑐫𑐵𑐡𑐶𑐳𑑃 dhayādisam̐	𑐢𑐫𑐵𑐧𑐶𑐖𑑂𑐫𑐵𑐴𑐸𑑃 dhayābijyāhum̐
do	𑐫𑐵 yā	𑐫𑐵𑐣𑐵𑐡𑐶𑐳𑑃 yānādisam̐	𑐫𑐵𑐣𑐵𑐧𑐶𑐖𑑂𑐫𑐵𑐴𑐸𑑃 yānābijyāhum̐
worship	𑐥𑐸𑐖𑑂𑐫𑐵 pujyā	𑐥𑐸𑐖𑑂𑐫𑐵𑐣𑐵𑐡𑐶𑐳𑑃 pujyānādisam̐	𑐥𑐸𑐖𑑂𑐫𑐵𑐣𑐵𑐧𑐶𑐖𑑂𑐫𑐵𑐴𑐸𑑃 pujyānābijyāhum̐
sit	𑐦𑐾𑐟𑐸 phetu	𑐦𑐾𑐟𑐸𑐣𑐵𑐡𑐶𑐳𑑃 phetunādisam̐	𑐦𑐾𑐟𑐸𑐣𑐵𑐧𑐶𑐖𑑂𑐫𑐵𑐴𑐸𑑃 phetunābijyāhum̐

== Vocabulary ==
=== Loanwords ===
Newar is one of the most Sanskritised Sino-Tibetan languages. It borrows both tatsama (words as it is) and tadbhava (derived) words. According to linguist Mali, 90% of the loanwords in the Newar language are borrowed from Sanskrit. Besides royal and religious registers, Newar borrows Sanskrit loanwords for basic words ranging from animals, kinship, food, to day-to-day word. Below is a comparison of some Sanskrit tadbhava words in Classical and Modern Newar:

Modern Newar	Classical Newar	Sanskrit (orig. word)	Meaning
Ākhaḥ	Ākhara/Ākhala	Akṣara	Letter
Bhāḥta	Bhārato/Bhālata	Bhartā	Husband
Bhāy	Bhāṣā/Bhākhā	Bhāṣā	Language
Cikaṃ	Cikana/Cekana	Cikkaṇaṃ	Oil
Dekhā	Dikhā	Dikṣā	Initiation
Dey	Desa	Deśa	Country
Dhau	Dhari/Dhali	Dadhi	Curd
Duru	Dudu	Dugdha	Milk
Dyaḥ	Dyava	Deva	Deity
Gāṃ	Gāma	Grāma	Village
Ghaḥ	Ghara/Ghala	Ghaṭa	Water pot
Ghyaḥ	Ghyara/Ghyala	Ghṛta	Ghee
Gvaḥ	Gvara/Gvala	Gola	Circular
Haṃy	Hansa	Haṃśa	Duck
Jyātha/Jyithi	Jyātha/Jyithi	Jyeṣṭha/Jyeṣṭhi	Old Man/Woman
Kalāḥ	Kalāta	Kalatra	Wife
Kimi	Kimi	Kṛmi	Hookworm
Lhā	Lhasta/Lhāta	Hasta	Hand
Mākaḥ	Makarha/Mākala	Markaṭa	Monkey
Mandaḥ	Mandala	Maṇḍala	Circle
Manū	Manusa	Manuṣya	Human
Mū	Muga	Mudga	Green gram
Mvaḥ	Mvanda/Mola	Muṇḍa	Head
Nāṃ	Nāma	Nāma	Name
Naikyāḥ	Narikyāla/Nalikyāla	Nārikela	Coconut
Nhāy	Nhāsa	Nāsikā	Nose
Pukhū	Pukhuri	Puṣkarini	Pool
Sākhaḥ	Sākhara/Sākhala	Śarkarā	Jaggery
Saḥ	Sara/Sala	Svara	Voice
Vasaḥ	Vasata	Vastra	Cloth

=== Influence on other languages ===
The Newar language has influenced the Nepali language. According to linguist Pokharel, most of the Newar loanwords are borrowed in the eastern dialect or Standard Nepali. For instance, “door” is dailo in the rural dialect of Nepali, while in Kathmandu the standard term is ḍhokā, which is derived from the Newar word dhvākā. Most of the loanwords are directly borrowed from late Classical Newar, while other loanwords are derived from it. However, Modern Newar, unlike Nepali, does not retain the last syllables of Classical Newar words. The Classical Newar word like jhyāla (lit. 'window') is retained as it is in Nepali, while Modern Newar loses the last syllable and becomes jhyāḥ. Below are some samples of Newar loanwords in the Nepali language:

Newar	Nepali	Gloss
cukula	cukula	lock
dakarmi	ḍakarmī	mason
dhaliṃ	dalina	rafter, wooden beam
dhukū	dhukuṭī	treasury
jyābhala	jyāvala	tool, equipment
jyālā	jyālā	wage
jyāmi	jyāmī	laborer, worker
kavasi	kausi	roof terrace
lami	lamī	matchmaker
makala	makala	fire pot
patakhāla	parkhāla	wall
pasala	pasala	shop
pvāla	pvāla	hole
satala	satala	public rest house
sikarmi	sikarmī	carpenter
sukula	sukula	straw mat

Similarly, the Gurung language has adopted some loanwords like dakarmi, and sikarmi from Newar language in its lexicon.

== Sample text ==
The following sample text is the Newar translation of Article 1 of the Universal Declaration of Human Rights by the United Nations:

𑐢𑐵𑐬𑐵 𑑑: 𑐦𑐸𑐎𑑂𑐎 𑐩𑐣𑐹𑐟 𑐖𑐣𑑂𑐩𑐖𑐵𑐟 𑐳𑑂𑐰𑐟𑐣𑑂𑐟𑑂𑐬 𑐰 𑐥𑑂𑐬𑐟𑐶𑐲𑑂𑐛𑐵 𑐣𑐵𑐥 𑐀𑐢𑐶𑐎𑐵𑐬𑐫𑑂 𑐳𑐩𑐵𑐣 𑐖𑐸𑐂𑑋 𑐂𑐥𑐶𑑄 𑐰𑐶𑐰𑐾𑐎 𑐰 𑐎𑐵𑐬𑐞𑑄 𑐫𑐸𑐎𑑂𑐟 𑐖𑐸𑐂𑑋 𑐂𑐩𑐶𑐐𑐸 𑐨𑐵𑐟𑐺𑐟𑑂𑐰 𑐨𑐵𑐰𑐣𑐵 𑐎𑐫𑐵 𑐕𑐩𑑂𑐴𑐾𑐳𑑂𑐫𑐵𑑄 𑐩𑐾𑐩𑑂𑐴𑐾𑐳𑐶𑐟 𑐰𑑂𑐫𑐰𑐴𑐵𑐬 𑐫𑐵𑐫𑐾𑐩𑐵𑑅𑑋
धारा १: फुक्क मनूत जन्मजात स्वतन्त्र व प्रतिष्ठा नाप अधिकारय् समान जुइ। इपिं विवेक व कारणं युक्त जुइ। इमिगु भातृत्व भावना कया छम्हेस्यां मेम्हेसित व्यवहार यायेमाः।
Dhārā 1: phukka manūta janmajāta svatantra va pratiṣṭhā nāpa adhikāray samāna jui. ipiṃ viveka va kāraṇaṃ yukta jui. imigu bhātṛtva bhāvanā kayā chamhesyāṃ memhesita vyavahāra yāyemāḥ.
Article 1: All human-beings inborn free and dignity with rights-in equal are. They conscience and reason-by endowed are. Their brotherly spirit taken one-by another-towards conduct do-should.

Article 1: All human beings are born free and equal in dignity and rights. They are endowed with reason and conscience and should act towards one another in a spirit of brotherhood.

== See also ==
- Languages of Nepal
- Nepal Bhasa journalism
- Newa (Unicode block)
- List of Nepal Bhasa films
