= Dhon Cholecha =

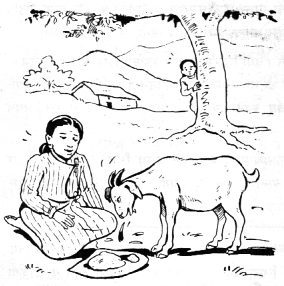
Punthakhu Maincha and Dhon Cholecha

Dhon Cholechā (Nepali: धों च्वलेचा:) is a Nepalese folktale about a little girl and an old nanny goat. It is the most well known children's story in Newar society of the Kathmandu Valley. It tells about a little girl named Punthakhu Mainchā (पुन्थखु मैंचा) and the ill treatment she suffers at the hands of her cruel step-mother. Dhon Cholechā means "old nanny goat" in Nepal Bhasa.

== The story ==
=== Punthakhu Maincha ===
There was a little girl named Punthakhu Maincha whose mother died when she was very young. Her father remarried and a daughter was born. Punthakhu Maincha's life became hard after that. Her step-mother was a cruel woman, she would make her do all the household chores and give her very little to eat. Punthakhu Maincha also had to take their old nanny goat, Dhon Cholecha, out to graze.

=== Dhon Cholecha ===
Despite the hard work and bad food, Punthakhu Maincha always looked healthy and well fed. So the step-mother told her daughter to spy on her elder sister when she took Dhon Cholecha to graze. The nanny goat knew what a hard life Punthakhu Maincha led, and so loved her very much. When the two reached the grazing spot, the goat would vomit out a delicious meal for Punthakhu Maincha, which was why she looked so well.

The step-sister reported to her mother what she had seen. The jealous woman made a plan to kill Dhon Cholecha so that Punthakhu Maincha wouldn't get any more food. Punthakhu Maincha was distressed when she learnt that her beloved Dhon Cholecha was going to be slaughtered for a family feast. The old nanny goat tried to console her, and instructed her to bury the bones in their garden. A fig tree would grow on the spot, and she could enjoy the fruits.

=== The demons ===
Punthakhu Maincha did not go to the feast pretending to be ill. Later, she collected the bones and buried them in the garden. A fig tree grew there as Dhon Cholecha had said. One day, as she was sitting on a branch eating the tree's fruits, two Lakheys (demons) disguised as an old couple came and asked her to throw them down some fruits. She did so, but the demons said they landed on dirt, and asked her to pick some more and come down herself.

When Punthakhu Maincha got down from the tree, they carried her off to their home. There the demons told Punthakhu Maincha to prepare flatbreads for dinner while they went to wash up.

=== The mouse ===
As she was cooking flatbreads, a mouse scurried out of a hole and said, "If you want to hear something, give me a flatbread." So Punthakhu Maincha gave the mouse a flatbread. It reappeared and said the same thing. And she gave it another one. The mouse came for the third time, and she gave it another one.

Then the mouse said, "These people are really Lakheys, and they are preparing to eat you. Pack up as much gold, silver, gems and other treasures as you can, and run away. Before you go, spit on each step of the staircase, and also leave a piece of charcoal on each one."

The demons returned and knocked on the door and called, but each time the glob of spit and the piece of charcoal replied "Yes" and "Okay". Finally, the demons forced their way in, and found that she had gone. Punthakhu Maincha reached home with the treasures, and told her astounded family all that had happened. The greedy step-mother decided to send her daughter too to get more riches.

=== The impatient daughter ===
So the daughter sat on the tree and the demons came as expected. They took her home and told her to prepare flatbreads while they went to wash up. When the mouse came repeatedly asking for a flatbread, she became irritated and touched it with a red hot shovel, sending it running back into its hole. Since the mouse didn't tell her anything, she had no idea what was going to happen. The demons returned and the three ate flatbreads and went to bed, with the girl sleeping in the middle.

When she was fast asleep, the male demon cut away a piece of her flesh with his knife. When she cried in pain, the female demon said, "Did grandfather pinch you?" and caressed her. A little later, she cut away a piece of her flesh too. The male demon then said, "Did grandmother pinch you? Come, lie next to me." This went on until only her bones were left.

The next day, the step-mother was combing her hair as she waited expectantly for her daughter to return with gold and silver. A crow perched on the roof and kept saying, "The mother is beautifying herself while the daughter is a skeleton." Wondering what the crow was trying to say, she went up to the roof and looked into the distance. She saw her daughter's bones kept out to dry in the demon's house. Then she beat her breast and cried.

== Publications ==
The story of Dhon Cholecha was featured in an anthology of folktales in Nepal Bhasa published in 1966. English, French and Japanese translations have also been published.

== See also ==
- One-Eye, Two-Eyes, and Three-Eyes
