= Bal Krishna Pokharel =

Nepali linguist (1933 -2019)

- Born: 28 August 1933; Chisapani Gadhi, Makwanpur, Nepal
- Died: 24 February 2019 (aged 85); Biratnagar, Nepal
- Education: MA (Comparative philology)
- Alma mater: Calcutta University
- Occupations: Writer, linguist, anthropologist
- Children: 3
- Parents: Chhaya Devi Pokharel (mother); Sharada Pokharel (father)
- Awards: Madan Puraskar

Bal Krishna Pokharel (28 August 1933 – 24 February 2019) was a Nepalese writer, linguist, historian, and literary critic. He was one of the key person behind the publishing of Nepali Brihat Sabdakosh, a comprehensive Nepali dictionary. Alongside Nepali language, he also wrote in Sanskrit and Magar languages. He wrote multiple fiction, non-fiction and poetry books and was awarded with Madan Puraskar in 1963 for his book Nepali Bhasa Ra Sahitya (transl. Nepali Language and Literature).

== Early life ==
He was born on 28 August 1933 (13 Bhadra 1990 BS) on the day of Krishna Janmashtami in Chisapani Gadhi, Makwanpur, Nepal to father 'Subba' Sharada Pokhrel and mother Chhaya Devi Pokhrel. He began his formal education from Tri-Juddha High English School, Biratnagar, Nepal in 1946. He also learnt Magar language, an indigenous Nepalese language, in around 1950.

He obtained a Matriculation certificate from Banaras Hindu University of India in 1952. He received a master's degree in comparative linguistics (then called comparative philology) from Kolkata University. He obtained an M.A. in Nepali literature with the First class first position and gold medal from Tribhuvan University, Nepal in 1973.

== Literary career ==
After completing his education, he started teaching at Tribhuvan University from 2019 BS (c. 1962/1963) and at Morang College subsequently. He retired from teaching in 2046 BS (c. 1989/1990).

In 1963 (2021 BS), Pokharel was awarded the Madan Puraskar, Nepal's highest literary honour for his book Nepali Bhasa Ra Sahitya.

In 2017, he was awarded the Lekhnath Literary Award.

== Notable works ==
=== Non-fictions ===
- Nepali Bhasa ko Katha (Linguistic non-fiction, 1962)^{[Note a]}
- Nepal Ra Chetriya Bhasaharu ko Sambandha (Linguistic non-fiction, 1963)
- Panch Saya Barsha (Historical non-fiction, 1963)
- Nepali Bhasa Ra Sahitya (Essays, 1964)
- Rastrabhasa (Essays, 1965)
- Dhoni Prakriya ra Dhoni Siddhanta (Linguistic non-fiction, 1970)
- College Starko Nibandhai Nibandha (Essays, 1971)
- Ek Man Saat Chintan (Curriculum supplements, 1973)
- Pachhis Barsa ka Bhashik Charcha (Essays, 1982)
- Tesro Ekmukhe Rudrakshako Khoji (Essays, 1983)
- Nepali Nirwachan – Volume 1 (Election non-fiction, 1989)
- Nepali Nirwachan –Volume 2 (Election non-fiction, 1993)
- Khas Jaati ko Itihaas (Anthropological non-fiction, 1998)
- Nepali Byakaran Sharada – Volume 1 (Linguistic non-fiction, 2006)
- Man ka Tareliharu (Essays, 2010)
- Ma Ajhai Hajir Chhu (Essays, 2015)

=== Poetry collections ===
- Shanti Sena (Nepali poems, 1953)
- Ukus Mukus (Nepali poems, 1972)
- Sauri (Nepali poems, 1983)
- Atreyo Balakrishnoham (Sanskrit poem, 2009)
- Kanung Laam (Magar language poems, 2010)
- Astha Anastha Astha (Nepali epic, 2015)

=== Story collections ===
- Kalo Bhoot (Stories, 1954)
- Birachana (Stories, with other writers, 1969)
- Ek Tapari Bhat (Stories, 1971)
- Sodhai ra Jawaph (Stories, 1974)
- Kane Khusi (Stories, 1977)
- Ma Gayal Chhaina (Stories, 2015)

=== Novels ===
- Mahamanav ko Sapana (Novel, 2010)
- Napi Poora Hudaina Kyare (Novel, 2015)

=== Dictionary and thesaurus ===
- Nepali Brihat Sabdakosh (Nepali language dictionary, with others, 1983)
- Jharro Sabdawali (Vernacular Nepali thesaurus, 2007)
- Pokharel ko Brihat Nepali–Angrezi–Nepali Kosh (Nepali to English thesaurus, 2013)

=== Play ===
- Hastakshar Huna Napaundai (Play, 1987)

== Death ==
Pokharel died on 24 February 2019 in Biratnagar. His body was cremated at Paropakarghat. He is survived by a son and two daughters.

== Notes ==
1. ^[Note a] All the books mentioned below are in Nepali language unless specified otherwise.
