= Pahari language (Sino-Tibetan) =

Sino-Tibetan language of Nepal

Pahari
- Region: Nepal
- Native speakers: c. 3,500 (2011)
- Language family: Sino-Tibetan: Newaric; Newar; Pahari

Language codes
- ISO 639-3: phj
- Glottolog: paha1257
- Location of Lalitpur District, the region with the highest number of speakers
- Coordinates: 27.57°N 85.32°E

Pahari is an endangered Tibeto-Burman language spoken by about 3,500 people in central Nepal.

Pahari is closely related to Newar, and has until recently been treated in the linguistic literature as a dialect of it. Pahari shares 55–65% of its basic vocabulary with Newar, which suggests the two are not mutually intelligible, and their speakers consider them to be separate languages.

The language is endangered as it is no longer being passed on to the next generation. The ethnic population number 13,600 (as of 2011), but only a quarter of them are native speakers of the language. Almost all Paharis speak Nepali, while some are also fluent in the ethnic languages of their neighbours, like Tamang or Newar. Pahari speakers are most numerous in Lalitpur district, but there are also communities in nearby regions: Sindhupalchok, Makwanpur, Ramechhap, Rautahat, Sindhuli and Kavre. There are at least two dialects – of Lalitpur and Sindhupalchok – and they are not mutually intelligible.

The term Pahari (पहरी paharī, variously romanised as Pahari, Pahri, Pahi, Padhi, and Phri) is an exonym, although the speakers themselves use it. The Paharis' own terms for the language are Pihi in Lalitpur District and Pahara in Sindhupalchok. The term Nagarkoti has also been in use since the 19th century by speakers in Lalitpur district. The word Pahari is ambiguous: it is also sometimes used in rural areas to refer to Nepali, and it is the common name for several other languages of South Asia.

== Sources ==
- Riccardi, Theodore (2003). "Nepali". In George Cardona; Dhanesh Jain (eds.). The Indo-Aryan languages. Routledge language family series. Y. London: Routledge. p. 540. ISBN 978-0-7007-1130-7.
- Shrestha, Omkareshwor (2010). A Grammar of Pahari (PhD). Tribhuvan University. [A description of the variety of the hamlet of Kodku, Badikhel VDC, Lalitpur district]
- Smith, Brianne J. (2022). A Sociolinguistic Study of Pahari: A Language of Nepal (Report). Journal of Language Survey Reports. 2022-003.
