= Dolakha Newar language =

Newar dialect of Nepal

Dolakha Newar
- Dolakhāe Newar; Dolakhā Newār
- 𑐡𑑂𑐰𑐵𑐮𑑂𑐏𑐵 𑐣𑐾𑐥𑐵𑐮 𑐨𑐵𑐲𑐵, Dwālkhā Nepal Bhasa
- Native to: Nepal
- Native speakers: (undated figure of 5,000–10,000)
- Language family: Sino-Tibetan: Newaric; Newar; Dolakha Newar

Language codes
- ISO 639-3: None (mis)
- Glottolog: east2773

Dolakha Newar (endonym Dwālkhā Nepal Bhasa), or Eastern Newar, is a divergent dialect of the Newar language (Nepal Bhasa) spoken in Dolakha District, east of the Kathmandu Valley of Nepal, by 5,645 Newar people as of 1988. Some speakers of Dolakha Newar can be found in Kathmandu for education or work.

== Geographical region ==
Dolakha Newar is spoken in Dolakha town of Dolakha district, Tauthali, Listi, Jethal of Sindupalchowk district, Duti of Kavrepalchowk district.

== Phonology ==
=== Consonants ===
| | | Labial | Dental/ Alveolar | Retroflex | (Alveolo-) palatal | Velar | Glottal |
|---|---|---|---|---|---|---|---|
| Stop/ Affricate | voiceless | p | t | ʈ | tɕ | k | |
| Stop/ Affricate | aspirated | pʰ | tʰ | ʈʰ | tɕʰ | kʰ | |
| Stop/ Affricate | voiced | b | d | ɖ | dʑ | ɡ | |
| Stop/ Affricate | murmured | bʱ | dʱ | ɖʱ | dʑʱ | ɡʱ | |
| Fricative | | | s | | | | h |
| Nasal | voiced | m | n | | | ŋ | |
| Nasal | murmured | | | | | | |
| Tap | voiced | | (ɾ) | [ɽ] | | | |
| Tap | murmured | | [ɾʱ] | [ɽʱ] | | | |
| Lateral | voiced | | l | | | | |
| Lateral | murmured | | | | | | |
| Approximant | voiced | w | | | j | | |
| Approximant | murmured | | | | | | |

Notes

- Marginal phonemes are in parentheses.
- Allophonic variants are in Square brackets.
- Tap consonants mainly occur as word-medial alternates of /t/, /d/, /dʱ/ or /ɖ/ (in Dolakha only).
- /s/ can be heard as [ɕ] when occurring before front vowels/glide /i, e, j/.
- Affricates /tɕ, dʑ/ can also shift to retracted sounds [t̠s̠, d̠z̠] when occurring before back vowels.

=== Vowels ===
| | Front | | | Central | | | Back | | |
| | short | long | nasal | short | long | nasal | short | long | nasal |
|---|---|---|---|---|---|---|---|---|---|
| Close | i | iː | ĩ | | | | u | uː | ũ |
| Close-mid | e | eː | ẽ | | | | o | oː | õ |
| Mid | | | | (ə) | (əː) | (ə̃) | ɔ~ɑ | ɔː~ɑː | ɔ̃~ɑ̃ |
| Open-mid | | | | | | | ɔ~ɑ | ɔː~ɑː | ɔ̃~ɑ̃ |
| Open | | | | a | aː | ã | ɔ~ɑ | ɔː~ɑː | ɔ̃~ɑ̃ |

- /o, oː/ and /u/ can also be heard as [ɔ, ɔː], and [ʊ].
- In Dolakha Newar, the back vowel sound can be [ɑ], [ʌ], or [ə].
- The following nasal vowels can also be distinguished in vowel length as /ĩː ẽː ɔ̃ː ãː õː ũː/.

==== Diphthongs ====
| | | Front | | Central | | Back | |
| | | oral | nasal | oral | nasal | oral | nasal |
|---|---|---|---|---|---|---|---|
| Diphthong | Close | ui | uĩ | | | | |
| Diphthong | Mid | ei | eĩ | ɔi | ɔĩ | ɔu | ɔũ |
| Diphthong | Open | | | ai | aĩ | au | aũ |

== Number ==
| No. | Dolakha Newar |
|---|---|
| 1 | thi |
| 2 | ní |
| 3 | sõ |
| 4 | pe |
| 5 | ŋā |
| 6 | khu |
| 7 | nas |
| 8 | cyā |
| 9 | gu |
| 10 | ji(m) |

== Morphology ==
=== Nouns ===
==== Number ====
Dolakha Newar distinguishes two numbers on nominals: unmarked singular and plural =pen. The marker =pen changes to =pis when it is followed by case markers.

==== Case ====
To indicate syntactic relationship and positions of NPs in clauses, several case markers are employed. They are:

- Absolutive =Ø
- Ergative =na/=n
- Dative =ta
- Genitive =e
- Instrumental =na/=n
- Locative =ku
- Ablatives =laːn, =na, nasi
- Allative =ke

=== Pronouns ===
| | | Singular | Plural |
|---|---|---|---|
| 1st person | exclusive | dʒi | isi |
| 1st person | inclusive | dʒi | tʃidʒi/tʰidʒi |
| 2nd person | honorific | tʰamu | tʰapen |
| 2nd person | non-honorific | tʃi | tʃipen |
| 3rd person | proximal | u | upen |
| 3rd person | distal | (u)aːm | aːpen |

=== Interrogatives ===
| | Interrogatives |
|---|---|
| gu(ri) | 'which?' |
| gun | 'who, which?' (human) |
| gunaːn | 'who?' (ERG) |
| gunta | 'whom?' (DAT) |
| gune | 'whose?' (GEN) |
| guli | 'how much, how many?' |
| gulpa | 'when?' |
| gibi | 'where?' |
| gibilaːn | 'from where?' (ABL) |
| gitʰi | 'how, in what manner?' |
| ginaːru | 'how, what type?' |
| haːti | 'what?' |
| haːtta | 'where?' |

=== Verbs ===
Person indexation in Dolakhae Newar
| | 1SG | 1PL | 2SG | 2PL | 2.HON | 3SG | 3PL |
|---|---|---|---|---|---|---|---|
| Future | -Ø | -Ø | -na | -nan | -ta | -u, -ŋ | -tan |
| Present/Past | -gi | -gu | -mun/-n | -min | -gu | -dʒu, -a/-i | -hin |
| Anterior | -ĩ | -pe | -n | -min | -pe | -dʒu | -tan |
